= Greater Austin =

Coordinates: 30°16′2″N 97°44′35″W

- Metropolitan statistical area
- Austin–Round Rock–Georgetown, Texas Metropolitan Statistical Area
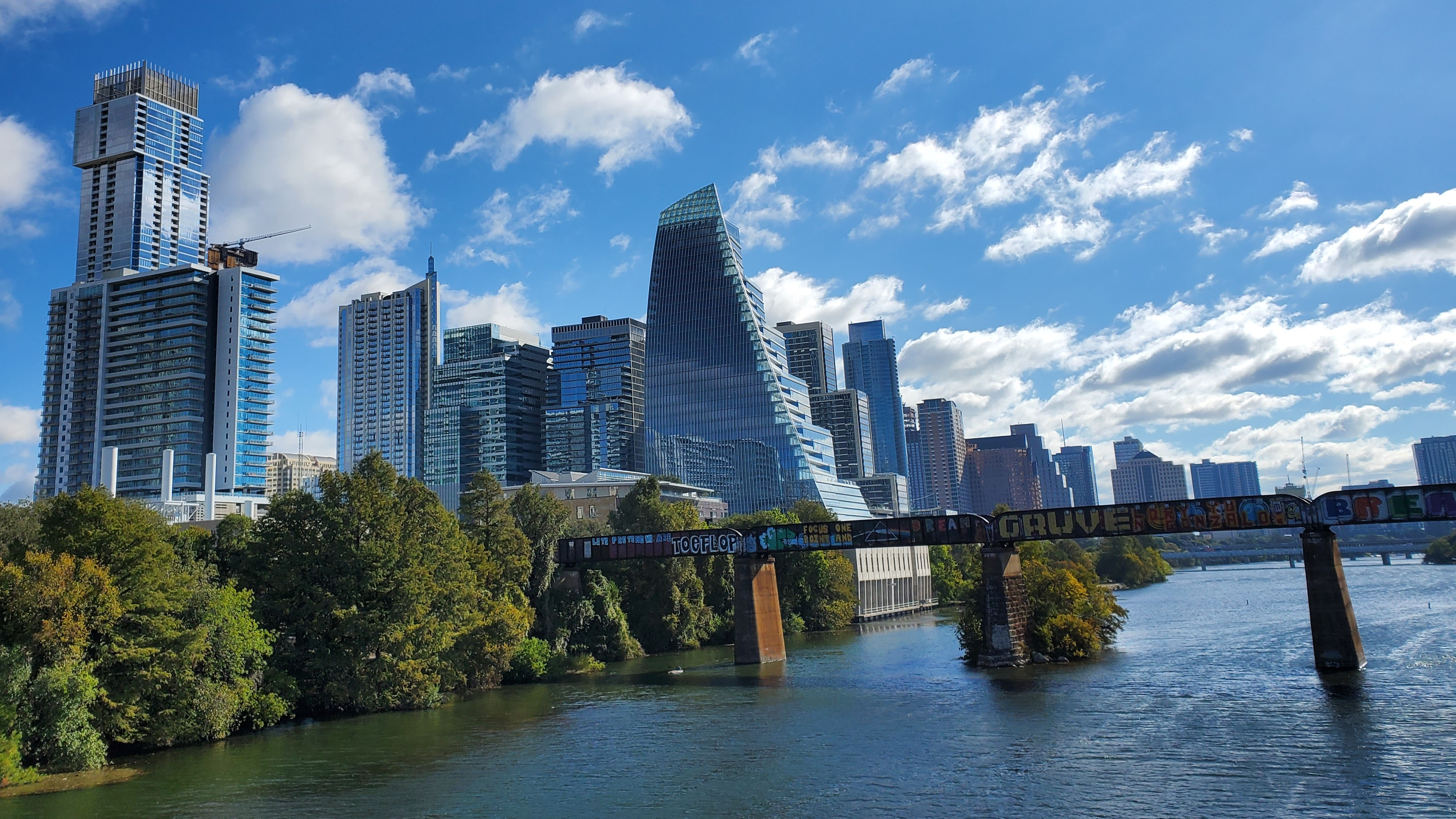
- Downtown Austin in October 2022
Interactive map of the Austin Metropolitan Area
Austin–Round Rock–San Marcos MSA
City of Austin
City of Round Rock
City of San Marcos
City of Georgetown
- Country: United States
- State: Texas
- Principal cities: Austin; Buda; Bastrop; Bertram; Burnet; Dripping Springs; Elgin; Kyle; Taylor; Round Rock; Cedar Park; Georgetown; Pflugerville; Hutto; Jarrell; Leander; Liberty Hill; Lockhart; Manor; Marble Falls; San Marcos; Wimberley

Area
  - MSA: 4,279 sq mi (11,080 km^{2})

Population (2020)
  - MSA: 2,473,275 (26th)
  - MSA density: 533.62/sq mi (206.03/km^{2})

GDP
  - MSA: $248.110 billion (2023)
- Time zone: UTC-6 (CST)
  - Summer (DST): UTC-5 (CDT)

The Austin–Round Rock–San Marcos metropolitan statistical area, otherwise known as the Capital Region or Greater Austin, is a five-county metropolitan area in the U.S. state of Texas, as defined by the Office of Management and Budget. The metropolitan area is situated in Central Texas on the western edge of the American South and on the eastern edge of the American Southwest, and borders Greater San Antonio to the south. It forms part of the larger San Antonio–Austin metroplex.

As of the 2020 U.S. census, the Austin–Round Rock–San Marcos MSA is the 25th-largest metropolitan area in the United States, with a total population of 2,352,426. The metropolitan area contains the city of Austin—the fourth-largest city in Texas and the 10th-largest city in the United States with a population of 974,447 people. Austin's largest suburbs are Round Rock, Cedar Park, Georgetown, San Marcos, Leander, and Pflugerville.

== History ==
=== Prehistory ===
Archeologists divide the Texas prehistoric archeological record into five general periods: pre-Clovis (ca. 18,000 plus –13,400 year ago), Paleoindian (13,400–10,000 years ago), Archaic (10,000 years ago to ca. 2000 years ago), Woodland (ca. 2500–1150 years ago; select regions), and the Late Prehistoric (ca. 1250–1150–420 years ago). All but the Woodland period are applicable to the Greater Austin area. Some research adds what is called the Protohistoric period, the short period of first contact between Indigenous Peoples and Europeans (Spanish and French) upon their first arrival; it is before the start of what is considered historic times.

The earliest known inhabitants of the area, during the late Pleistocene (Ice Age), date to between 12,000 to 22,000 years ago as evidenced by the Gault (archaeological site) just west of Williamson County and the Wilson-Leonard Site, best known for the discovery of Leanderthal Lady ("Leanne") at the Wilson-Leonard site near Leander, Texas. But archeology dig sites show a much greater evidence of Archaic Period inhabitants has been recovered from burned rock middens and rock shelters near Round Rock along Brushy Creek, in Georgetown along the San Gabriel River, and in Austin especially near Barton Springs. The prehistory of Texas has been studied by both professional and avocational archeologists for many decades. Pre-historic campsites are found throughout the county along streams or other water sources; most are "open occupation" sites, though caves and rockshelters are often found along various rivers and streams.

Native American Coahuiltecan descendants include Barton Springs among the four springs part of their creation story dating to prehistoric times; these springs are Comal Springs, Barton Springs, San Marcos Springs and San Antonio Springs. While there were many other tribes associated with the Greater Austin area, the present territory of central Texas was not the long-term ancestral homeland of any indigenous group for whom an ethnographic account exists. The ethnographically well-known Comanche, Lipan Apache, Waco and even the Tonkawa arrived in central Texas just before or during the early European contact period."

=== 18th and 19th century ===
Spanish explorers, including the Espinosa-Olivares-Aguirre expedition, traveled through the area for centuries though few permanent settlements were created for some time. In the mid-18th century the San Xavier missions were established along the San Gabriel River in what is now western Milam County to facilitate exploration.

In 1804 the fort Puesta del Colorado was established by the Spanish in what is now Bastrop. In 1807 the San Marcos de Neve settlement (modern San Marcos) was established on the San Marcos River. Following the independence of Mexico, of which Texas was a part, the empresario Stephen F. Austin issued grants to settlers in what is now Bastrop and Fayette Counties. During the mid-1820s settlements were established along the Colorado River near modern La Grange. The village of Mina (later renamed Bastrop) was established in 1827. Growth of the settlements was stagnant for some time because of conflicts with the Native Americans in the region. Nevertheless, the region sat along an important trade route known as the Camino Real de los Tejas, which ran from Mexico, though San Antonio and San Marcos, to Natchitoches. During the 1830s others, such as Martín Veramendi and Thomas G. McGehee, were issued land grants by the Mexican government to encourage settlement in the region. A string of forts was established east of modern Austin in what was then the western frontier.

In 1835 Texans fought for independence in the Texas Revolution and won. Following independence other settlements were gradually established including Waterloo and Brushy Creek (modern Round Rock). In 1839 a commission appointed by Texas President Mirabeau B. Lamar selected Waterloo as the site for the new capital and the name Austin was chosen as the town's new name. In 1840 a series of conflicts between the Texas Rangers and the Comanche occurred. It began with the Council House Fight, also known as the Council House Massacre, in which a large number of Penateka Comanche leaders and family were killed in San Antonio while attending a peace treaty. The Comanche in turn attacked Victoria and Linnville in what is known as the Great Raid of 1840. This was followed by the Battle of Plum Creek near Lockhart, Texas, and finally in October of 1840 an expedition commanded by Colonel John Henry Moore in what is known as the Comanche Village Massacre. Travis County, originally part of Bastrop County, was established in 1840 and the surrounding counties were mostly established within the next two decades.

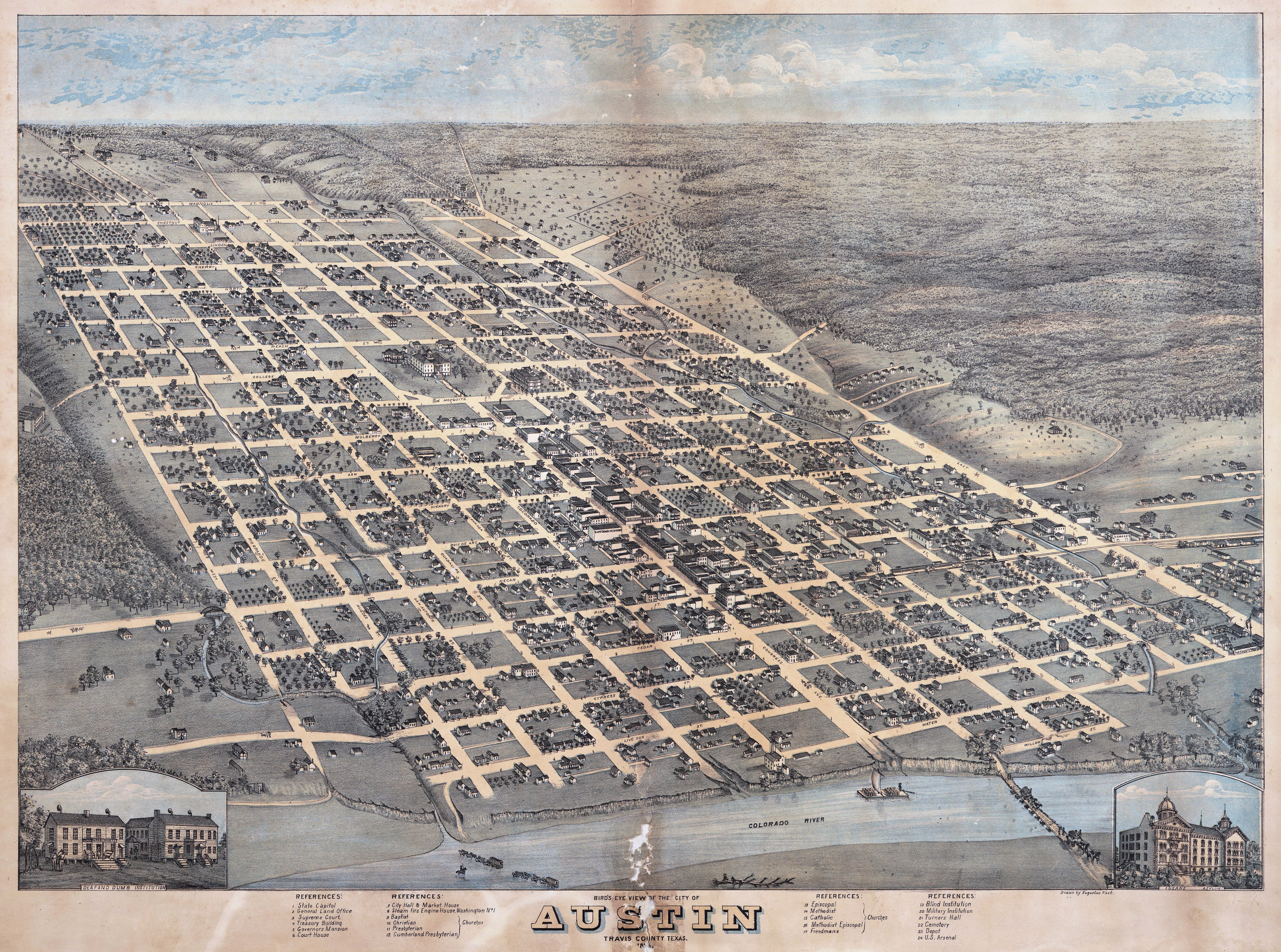
An 1873 illustration of Austin

In 1861, with the outbreak of the American Civil War, voters in Austin, Bastrop, and other Central Texas communities and counties voted against secession. However, as the war progressed and fears of attack by Union forces increased, the communities contributed hundreds of men to the Confederate forces. With the end of the war and the emancipation of Texas slaves, the African American population of the area swelled dramatically. Black communities such as Wheatville, Pleasant Hill, and Clarksville were established around Austin by these newcomers. The postwar period saw dramatic population and economic growth. The town of Bastrop became a significant manufacturing center producing iron, coal, and textiles. The Chisolm Trail, one of the major routes for exporting cattle, passed through the region. The opening of the Houston and Texas Central Railway, connecting Austin with Houston, transformed Austin into the major trading center for the region. However, as new railroads were built through the region in the 1870s, Round Rock and other communities took over much of Austin's role as a trading center. In 1868 the Coronal Institute was established in San Marcos and in 1873 Texas University (later renamed Southwestern University) was opened in Georgetown following the consolidation of five earlier colleges. During the 1880s Austin gained new prominence as the state capitol building was constructed and other universities were established in the area, most notably the University of Texas. Cattle and cotton production were major economic drivers for many outlying communities. In the late 19th century Austin expanded its city limits to more than three times its former area and the Austin Dam was built to power a new street car line and the new municipal water system.

=== 20th century ===
In the early 20th century the Texas Oil Boom took hold creating tremendous economic opportunities in Southeast Texas and North Texas. The growth generated by this boom largely passed by Austin at first, with the city slipping from 4th largest to 10th largest in Texas between 1880 and 1920. Bastrop, however, became a significant center for oil drilling and coal mining in the early-to-mid-20th century. San Marcos, and some other communities, established significant manufacturing operations during the world wars substantially diversifying their economies.

Beginning in the 1920s and 1930s, Austin launched a series of civic development and beautification projects that created much of the city's infrastructure and parks. In addition, the state legislature established the Lower Colorado River Authority that, along with the City of Austin, created the system of dams along the Colorado River that formed the Highland Lakes. These projects were enabled in large part by the fact that Austin received more Depression era relief funds than any other Texas city.

During the mid- and later 20th century, Austin became firmly established as the major metropolitan center of what is now Greater Austin. Communities such as Round Rock, Georgetown, and San Marcos increasingly became attractive bedroom communities for Austin, even as each of these communities has maintained its own economic core as well. In the late 20th century, the face of the Austin community was changing very rapidly.

== Geography ==
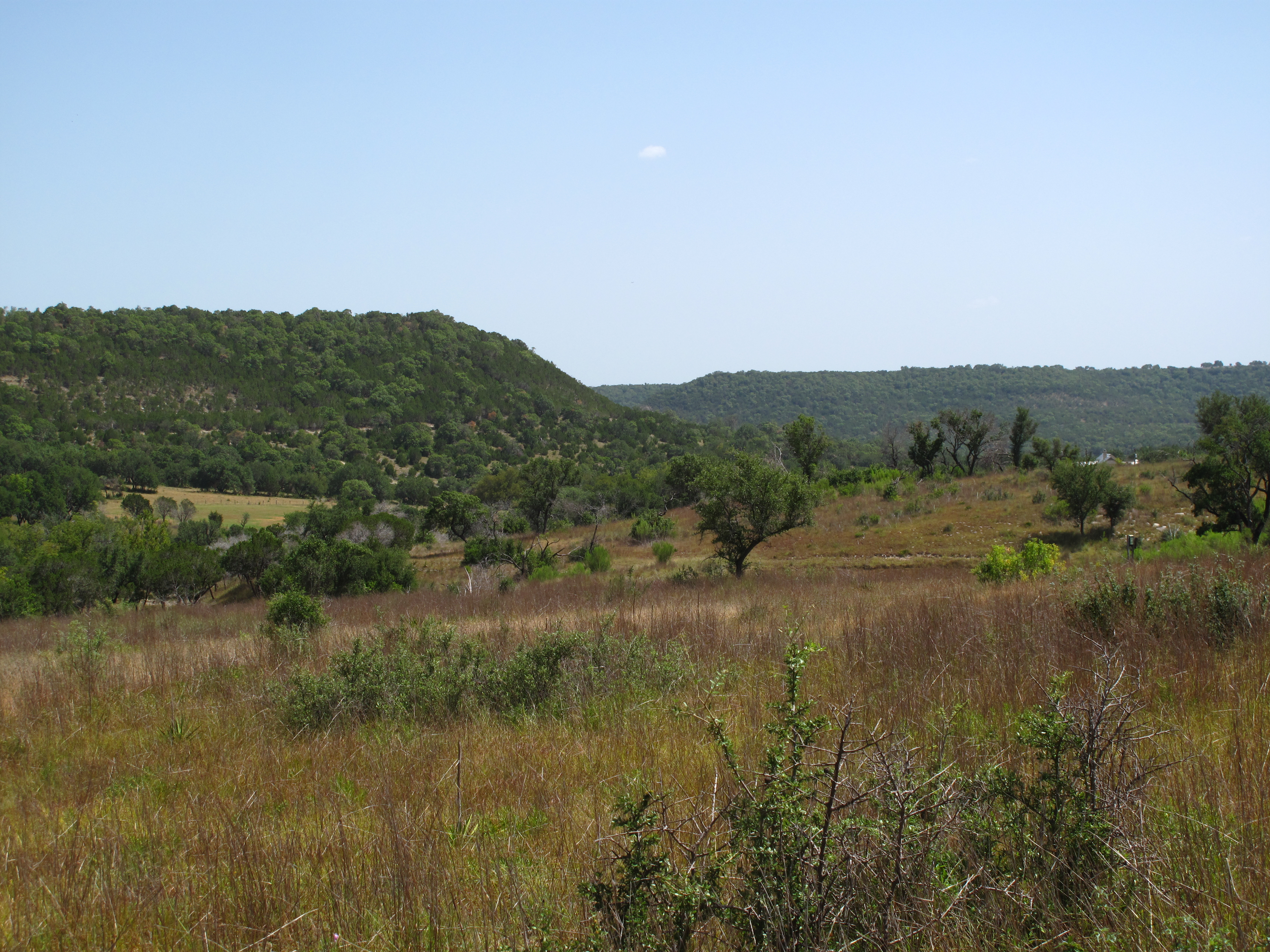
Balcones Canyonlands National Wildlife Refuge.

Greater Austin is located in Central Texas along the Balcones Fault and Interstate 35, northeast of San Antonio. The bisecting Balcones Fault renders eastern portions relatively flat and western portions—located on the edge of the Texas Hill Country—mildly hilly.

The region is crossed by the Colorado River with several human-made lakes, known as the Highland Lakes, along its length. Because the hills to the west are primarily limestone rock with a thin covering of topsoil, the western portions of the area are frequently subjected to flash floods from the runoff caused by thunderstorms. To help control this runoff and to generate hydroelectric power, the Lower Colorado River Authority operates a series of dams that form the lakes.

The Austin area is located at the intersection of four major ecological regions and is consequently a temperate-to-hot green oasis with a highly variable climate having some characteristics of the desert, the tropics, and a wetter climate. The area is very diverse ecologically and biologically, and is home to a variety of animals and plants.

Highland Lakes
Lake	Dam
Lake Buchanan	Buchanan Dam
Inks Lake	Inks Dam
Lake LBJ	Wirtz Dam
Lake Marble Falls	Max Starcke Dam
Lake Travis	Mansfield Dam
Lake Austin	Tom Miller Dam
Lady Bird Lake	Longhorn Dam

The soils of Central Texas range from shallow, gravelly clay loams over limestone in the western outskirts to deep, fine sandy loams, silty clay loams, silty clays or clays in the city's eastern part. Some of the clays have pronounced shrink-swell properties and are difficult to work under most moisture conditions. Many of Austin's soils, especially the clay-rich types, are slightly to moderately alkaline and have free calcium carbonate.

=== Climate ===
Greater Austin has a humid subtropical climate, characterized by hot summers and mild winters. On average, the City of Austin receives 33.6 inches (853.4 mm) of rain per year, with most of the precipitation in the spring, and a secondary maximum in the fall. To the east, away from the Hill Country, precipitation is typically higher. For example, Bastrop receives an average of 38.0 inches (965.2 mm) of rain per year. During springtime, severe thunderstorms sometimes occur, though tornados are rare in the city. Austin is usually at least partially sunny.

Central Texas summers are usually hot and humid, with average temperatures of approximately 90 degrees Fahrenheit (32 Celsius) from June until September. Temperatures above 100 °F (38 °C) are common. For the entire year there is an average of 111 days above 90 °F (32 °C) and 198 days above 80 °F (27 °C) in the City of Austin. In general temperatures are somewhat cooler to the west in the Hill Country than in the plains to the east. The average August high temperature in Marble Falls is 94 °F (34 °C) compared to 96 °F (36 °C) in Bastrop, and the average January low in Marble Falls is 33 °F (1 °C) compared to 37 °F (3 °C) in Bastrop. Winters in the Austin area are mild and dry. For the entire year, Austin averages 88 days below 45 °F (7 °C) and 24 days when the minimum temperature falls below freezing. Snowfall is rare in Central Texas, but the area suffers occasional ice storms each year that freeze over roads and can affect parts of the region for as much as 48 hours or more.

Climate data for Camp Mabry, Austin, Texas (1991–2020 normals, (Note: Mean monthly maxima and minima (i.e. the highest and lowest temperature readings during an entire month or year) calculated based on data at said location from 1991 to 2020.) extremes 1897–present) (Note: Official records for Austin were kept at downtown from September 1897 to July 1942, Mueller Airport from August 1942 to June 1999, and at Camp Mabry since July 1999. For more information, see Threadex)
Month	Jan	Feb	Mar	Apr	May	Jun	Jul	Aug	Sep	Oct	Nov	Dec	Year
Record high °F (°C)	90 (32)	99 (37)	98 (37)	99 (37)	104 (40)	109 (43)	109 (43)	112 (44)	112 (44)	101 (38)	93 (34)	90 (32)	112 (44)
Mean maximum °F (°C)	80.1 (26.7)	84.2 (29.0)	87.7 (30.9)	91.8 (33.2)	95.5 (35.3)	99.5 (37.5)	102.3 (39.1)	103.9 (39.9)	99.9 (37.7)	93.7 (34.3)	85.3 (29.6)	80.5 (26.9)	105.3 (40.7)
Mean daily maximum °F (°C)	62.5 (16.9)	66.5 (19.2)	73.3 (22.9)	80.3 (26.8)	86.9 (30.5)	93.2 (34.0)	96.6 (35.9)	97.8 (36.6)	91.4 (33.0)	82.5 (28.1)	71.5 (21.9)	63.9 (17.7)	80.5 (26.9)
Daily mean °F (°C)	52.2 (11.2)	56.1 (13.4)	62.8 (17.1)	69.6 (20.9)	76.8 (24.9)	83.0 (28.3)	85.8 (29.9)	86.5 (30.3)	80.8 (27.1)	71.6 (22.0)	61.0 (16.1)	53.6 (12.0)	70.0 (21.1)
Mean daily minimum °F (°C)	41.8 (5.4)	45.8 (7.7)	52.2 (11.2)	58.9 (14.9)	66.8 (19.3)	72.9 (22.7)	75.0 (23.9)	75.1 (23.9)	70.1 (21.2)	60.8 (16.0)	50.5 (10.3)	43.4 (6.3)	59.4 (15.2)
Mean minimum °F (°C)	27.1 (−2.7)	30.3 (−0.9)	34.8 (1.6)	42.8 (6.0)	53.4 (11.9)	65.0 (18.3)	70.1 (21.2)	69.3 (20.7)	58.5 (14.7)	43.7 (6.5)	33.8 (1.0)	28.6 (−1.9)	24.2 (−4.3)
Record low °F (°C)	−2 (−19)	−1 (−18)	18 (−8)	30 (−1)	40 (4)	51 (11)	57 (14)	58 (14)	41 (5)	30 (−1)	20 (−7)	4 (−16)	−2 (−19)
Average precipitation inches (mm)	2.64 (67)	1.89 (48)	2.88 (73)	2.42 (61)	5.04 (128)	3.68 (93)	1.96 (50)	2.74 (70)	3.45 (88)	3.91 (99)	2.92 (74)	2.72 (69)	36.25 (921)
Average snowfall inches (cm)	0.0 (0.0)	0.2 (0.51)	0.0 (0.0)	0.0 (0.0)	0.0 (0.0)	0.0 (0.0)	0.0 (0.0)	0.0 (0.0)	0.0 (0.0)	0.0 (0.0)	0.0 (0.0)	0.0 (0.0)	0.2 (0.51)
Average precipitation days (≥ 0.01 in)	7.6	7.7	8.9	7.1	8.9	7.4	4.9	4.8	7.1	7.0	6.9	7.5	85.8
Average snowy days (≥ 0.1 in)	0.2	0.3	0.0	0.0	0.0	0.0	0.0	0.0	0.0	0.0	0.0	0.1	0.6
Average relative humidity (%)	67.2	66.0	64.2	66.4	71.4	69.5	65.1	63.8	68.4	67.1	68.7	67.6	67.1
Average dew point °F (°C)	36.1 (2.3)	39.6 (4.2)	46.2 (7.9)	55.0 (12.8)	63.3 (17.4)	68.2 (20.1)	68.9 (20.5)	68.4 (20.2)	65.5 (18.6)	56.5 (13.6)	47.7 (8.7)	39.4 (4.1)	54.6 (12.5)
Mean monthly sunshine hours	163.8	169.3	205.9	205.8	227.1	285.5	317.2	297.9	233.8	215.6	168.3	153.5	2,643.7
Percentage possible sunshine	51	54	55	53	54	68	74	73	63	61	53	48	60
Average ultraviolet index	4	6	8	9	10	11	11	10	9	7	5	4	8
Source 1: NOAA (relative humidity and sun 1961–1990),
Source 2: Weather Atlas (UV index)

=== Boundaries ===
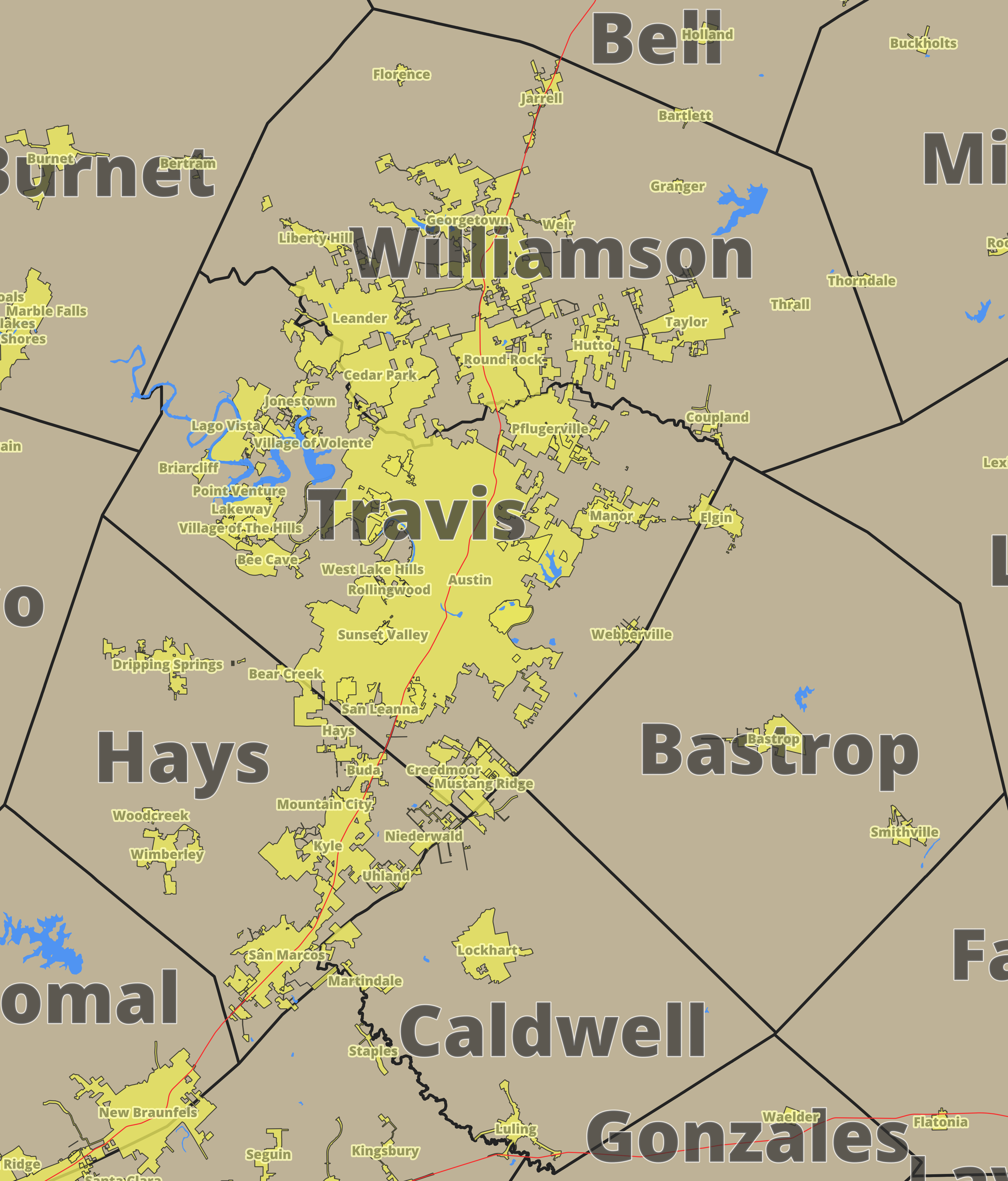
Greater Austin

==== Counties ====
As of July 2023, the U.S. Office of Management and Budget (OMB) defines the Austin–Round Rock–San Marcos MSA as including Bastrop, Caldwell, Hays, Travis, and Williamson Counties.

The U.S. Bureau of Economic Analysis includes the counties of Blanco, Burnet, Lee, Llano, Mason, and Milam Counties, in addition to the Austin MSA, in its definition of the Austin Economic Area. The Capital Area Council of Governments, an Austin-area intergovernmental cooperative, adds Blanco, Burnet, Fayette, Lee, and Llano Counties to the MSA counties in its definition of the metropolitan area.

When Standard Metropolitan Areas (predecessors of today's Metropolitan Statistical Areas) were introduced by the Bureau of the Budget (now the OMB) in 1950, the Austin SMA was defined as solely consisting of Travis County. Hays County was added to the statistical area in 1973, and Williamson County was added in 1981. Bastrop and Caldwell Counties were added in 1993, giving the MSA its current five-county form.

County	Seat	2025 estimate	2020 Census	Change	Area	Density
Travis	Austin	1,389,670	1,290,188	+7.71%	1,023 sq mi (2,650 km^{2})	1,358/sq mi (524/km^{2})
Williamson	Georgetown	752,827	609,017	+23.61%	1,134 sq mi (2,940 km^{2})	664/sq mi (256/km^{2})
Hays	San Marcos	304,390	241,067	+26.27%	680 sq mi (1,800 km^{2})	448/sq mi (173/km^{2})
Bastrop	Bastrop	118,908	97,217	+22.31%	896 sq mi (2,320 km^{2})	133/sq mi (51/km^{2})
Caldwell	Lockhart	55,150	45,883	+20.20%	546 sq mi (1,410 km^{2})	101/sq mi (39/km^{2})
Total		2,620,945	2,283,371	+14.78%	4,279 sq mi (11,080 km^{2})	613/sq mi (236/km^{2})

===== Historical population =====
Counties shaded gray were not a part of the Austin, TX MSA at the time of that Census and the county's population is not included in the MSA total.

County	2020 census	2010 census	2000 census	1990 census	1980 census	1970 census	1960 census	1950 census
Bastrop	97,216	74,171	57,733	38,263	24,726	17,297	16,925	19,622
Caldwell	45,883	38,066	32,194	26,392	23,637	21,178	17,222	19,350
Hays	241,067	157,127	97,589	65,614	40,594	27,642	19,934	17,840
Travis	1,290,108	1,024,266	812,280	576,407	419,573	295,516	212,136	160,980
Williamson	609,017	422,679	249,967	139,551	76,521	37,305	35,044	38,853
Austin Metropolitan Area	2,283,371	1,716,309	1,249,763	781,572	460,167	295,516	212,136	160,980

==== Communities ====
The following are cities, towns, and villages categorized based on the United States Census Bureau 2025 population estimates. No population estimates are released for census-designated places (CDPs), which are marked with an asterisk (*). These places are categorized based on their 2020 Census population.

===== Cities with more than 20,000 inhabitants =====
City	2025 Estimate	2020 census	Change	Image
Austin	1,002,632	961,855	+4.24%	
Round Rock	141,282	119,468	+18.26%	
Georgetown	106,907	67,176	+59.14%	
Leander	91,132	59,202	+53.93%	
Cedar Park	79,032	77,595	+1.85%	
San Marcos	77,830	67,553	+15.21%	
Kyle	69,917	45,697	+53.00%	
Pflugerville	68,316	65,191	+4.79%	
Hutto	46,048	27,577	+66.98%	
Brushy Creek*	—	22,519	—	
Manor	23,070	13,652	+68.92%	

===== Places with 5,000 to 20,000 inhabitants =====
- Lakeway (19,027)
- Taylor (18,402)
- Lockhart (18,159)
- Steiner Ranch* (16,713)
- Buda (16,166)
- Wells Branch* (14,000)
- Bastrop (13,383)
- Elgin (13,327)
- Liberty Hill (13,317)
- Hornsby Bend* (12,168)
- Dripping Springs (11,167)
- Lago Vista (10,498)
- Bee Cave (8,464)
- Camp Swift* (7,943)
- Sonterra* (7,679)
- Belterra* (6,170)
- Luling (5,920)
- Jarrell (5,870)

===== Places with 1,000 to 5,000 inhabitants =====
- Shady Hollow* (4,822)
- Smithville (4,367)
- Hudson Bend* (4,005)
- Wyldwood* (3,694)
- Barton Creek* (3,356)
- West Lake Hills (3,229)
- Cedar Creek* (3,154)
- Santa Rita Ranch* (3,152)
- Wimberley (2,909)
- Jonestown (2,687)
- Circle D-KC Estates* (2,588)
- Briarcliff (2,361)
- The Hills (2,322)
- Manchaca* (2,266)
- Serenada* (2,098)
- Uhland (1,958)
- Woodcreek (1,876)
- Garfield* (1,825)
- Bartlett (partial) (1,678)
- Rosanky* (1,473)
- Rollingwood (1,466)
- Thorndale (partial) (1,456)
- Martindale (1,298)
- Lost Creek* (1,276)
- Florence (1,245)
- Point Venture (1,233)
- Granger (1,228)
- Niederwald (1,168)
- Mustang Ridge (1,025)

===== Places with fewer than 1,000 inhabitants =====
- Thrall (886)
- Weir (792)
- McDade* (720)
- Mountain City (675)
- Sunset Valley (612)
- San Leanna (530)
- Volente (521)
- Webberville (495)
- Bear Creek (476)
- Red Rock* (410)
- Creedmoor (402)
- Coupland (305)
- Paige* (278)
- Hays (271)
- Driftwood* (106)

===== Unincorporated places =====
- Alum Creek
- Andice
- Butler
- Colorado
- Corn Hill
- Dale
- Delhi
- Flower Hill
- Hills (partial)
- Jeddo
- Jollyville
- Kirtley (partial)
- Maxwell
- McNeil
- Norman's Crossing
- Prairie Lea
- Sayersville
- Schwertner
- String Prairie
- Theon
- Togo
- Upton
- Walburg
- Waterloo
- Windemere

===== Other =====
More distant communities such as Marble Falls, Burnet, Johnson City, Killeen, and Lampasas are sometimes considered part of Greater Austin though they fall outside the bounds of the OMB definitions. There are over 5 million people in the Austin-San Antonio corridor.

== Demographics ==
Historical population
Census	Pop.	Note	%±
1950	160,980		—
1960	212,136		31.8%
1970	295,516		39.3%
1980	536,688		81.6%
1990	781,572		45.6%
2000	1,249,763		59.9%
2010	1,716,309		37.3%
2020	2,283,371		33.0%
2025 (est.)	2,620,945		14.8%
U.S. Decennial Census; 2020 estimate

Greater Austin is one of the fastest growing large metropolitan areas in the U.S. In 2020, U.S. Census Bureau estimated that in the Austin–Round Rock–Georgetown MSA increased to 2,283,371 people, 796,315 households, and 495,990 families. The racial makeup of the metropolitan area was 66.4% White, 6.6% African American, 0.9% Native American, 7.0% Asian, 0.1% Pacific Islander, 11.1% from other races, and 16.5% from two or more races. Hispanic or Latino of any race were 31.9% of the population.

As of 2010, U.S. Census Bureau estimated that in the Austin–Round Rock–Georgetown MSA there were 1,719,289 people. The racial makeup of the metropolitan area was 72.9% White, 7.4% African American, 0.8% Native American, 4.8% Asian, 0.1% Pacific Islander, 10.9% from other races, and 3.2% from two or more races. Hispanic or Latino of any race were 31.4% of the population.

The median income for a household in the MSA was $46,512 and the median income for a family was $54,361. Males had a median income of $35,612 versus $27,095 for females. The per capita income for the MSA was $20,721.

As of 2014, the U.S. Census Bureau estimated the population of the Austin–Round Rock–Georgetown MSA had increased to 1,943,299. In 2010, the urban area population (as defined by the Census Bureau) was estimated to be 1,362,416 while the 2013 population of Austin proper estimated at 885,400.

Municipal population history 1950–2020
#	Largest cities in Greater Austin	County	1950	1960	1970	1980	1990	2000	2010	2020
1	Austin	Travis	132,459	186,545	251,808	345,496	472,020	656,562	790,390	961,855
2	Round Rock	Williamson	1,438	1,878	2,811	11,812	30,923	61,136	99,887	119,468
3	Cedar Park	Williamson	202	385	692	3,474	5,161	26,049	48,937	77,595
4	Georgetown	Williamson	4,951	5,218	6,395	9,468	14,842	28,339	47,400	67,176
5	San Marcos	Hays	9,980	12,713	18,860	23,420	28,738	34,733	44,894	67,553
6	Pflugerville	Travis	-	-	549	745	4,444	16,335	46,936	65,191
7	Leander	Williamson	-	-	-	2,179	3,398	7,596	26,521	59,202
8	Kyle	Hays	n/a	1,023	1,629	2,093	2,225	5,314	28,016	45,697
9	Hutto	Williamson	n/a	400	545	659	630	1,250	14,698	25,367
10	Lakeway	Travis	-	-	-	790	4,044	8,002	11,391	19,189
	Metropolitan Area total		160,980	301,261	398,938	585,051	846,227	1,249,763	1,716,289	2,283,371

== Economy ==
Employment by industry for MSA
Sector	Percentage
Professional and business services	18.3%
Government	17.3%
Education and health services	11.6%
Leisure and hospitality	9.8%
Retail trade	9.7%
Construction, natural resources, and mining	6.4%
Financial activities	6.3%
Manufacturing	5.8%
Wholesale trade	4.9%
Information	3.6%
Transportation, warehousing, and utilities	2.4%
Other services	3.8%

Greater Austin has a diverse economy, anchored by government, technology (particularly software and semiconductors), and education. The Austin-Round Rock MSA had an estimated gross domestic product of $168.4 billion in 2020, making it the 24th largest metropolitan economy in the U.S.

Dell, Oracle Corporation and Tesla, Inc. are headquartered in Greater Austin. Other major employers include Accenture, Amazon, Apple, Applied Materials, Austin Independent School District, Ascension Seton HealthCare network, H-E-B Grocery, IBM, NXP Semiconductors, Samsung Semiconductors, St. David's HealthCare Partnership, the Texas State Government, the United States Federal Government, The University of Texas at Austin, Whole Foods, and Wal-Mart.

== Culture and recreation ==
=== Annual events and festivals ===
The communities in Greater Austin hold many annual events. In Austin two of the most well known festivals are the South by Southwest Music and Film Festival and the Austin City Limits Music Festival, which draw artists and spectators from around the world. Many other Austin festivals take place including the Old Pecan Street Festival, Blues on the Green, and the Laguna Gloria Art Museum Fiesta. The Texas Hill Country Wine and Food Festival is centered in Austin but takes place at restaurants and venues in multiple communities.

Outside of Austin many communities host local events of their own. Marble Falls hosts the Bluebonnet Blues and Fine Arts Festival, an event that attracts artists and performers from around the state to the community's downtown. Burnet hosts the Spring Bluebonnet Festival, which features a golf tournament, car shows, vintage airplane shows, and other activities. The Old Settler's Music Festival in Driftwood features live outdoor performances ranging from folk music to bluegrass and jazz. Some area communities host civic heritage festivals including the Cedar Park Heritage Festival and the Chisolm Trail Round Up in Lockhart. The Oktoberfest celebration in Fredericksburg is one of the largest and most traditional in Texas.

Rodeo fairs occur annually including the Star of Texas Fair and Rodeo and the Burnet Rodeo.

=== Arts and music ===
Austin has adopted the nickname "Live Music Capital of the World" based on its claim of having the highest percentage of music performers of any other major city. The city has a variety of venues for live music performance of popular and country music including famous clubs such as Antone's and Emo's. The long-running television program Austin City Limits has for decades showcased the city's music scene, as has the South by Southwest festival and other events in the city. Apart from these the city hosts major classical music performances via the Austin Lyric Opera and the Austin Symphony Orchestra.

Other communities in the Austin Area host their own music venues and organizations as well. The Williamson County Symphony Orchestra, founded in 2002, offers performances at locations throughout the county. The Starlight Symphony, a community orchestra, offers performances at various venues within the southwestern areas of Greater Austin including San Marcos, Dripping Springs, and Johnson City. The Round Rock Symphony, a recently established organization, offers performances within Round Rock.

=== Sports ===
Austin's sole major-league professional sports team is Austin FC, a Major League Soccer team that debuted in 2021. Until then, the Austin metropolitan area was the second largest market in North America not to have any such franchises, behind the Inland Empire. The area is also home to several minor-league teams, as well as the Texas Longhorns and Texas State Bobcats collegiate sports programs and the Circuit of the Americas motor-racing circuit.

Regional professional sports clubs include the Round Rock Express in AAA baseball, the Texas Stars in AHL hockey, the Austin Spurs in G-League basketball, the Austin Aztex in USL soccer, the Austin Outlaws in WFA football, and the Austin Aces in WTT tennis. In professional motorsport, the Circuit of the Americas hosts the United States Grand Prix and the Motorcycle Grand Prix of the Americas, as well as the X Games. Austin also hosts the Texas Rollergirls flat-track roller derby league.

The region is also home to several endurance and multi-sport race events, including the Austin Marathon, the Capitol 10K race, and the Capital of Texas Triathlon. Sizeable running, swimming and bicycling communities make use of a network of trails and greenbelts centered on the Lady Bird Lake Hike and Bike Trail and local pools like Barton Springs Pool.

=== Parks and preserves ===
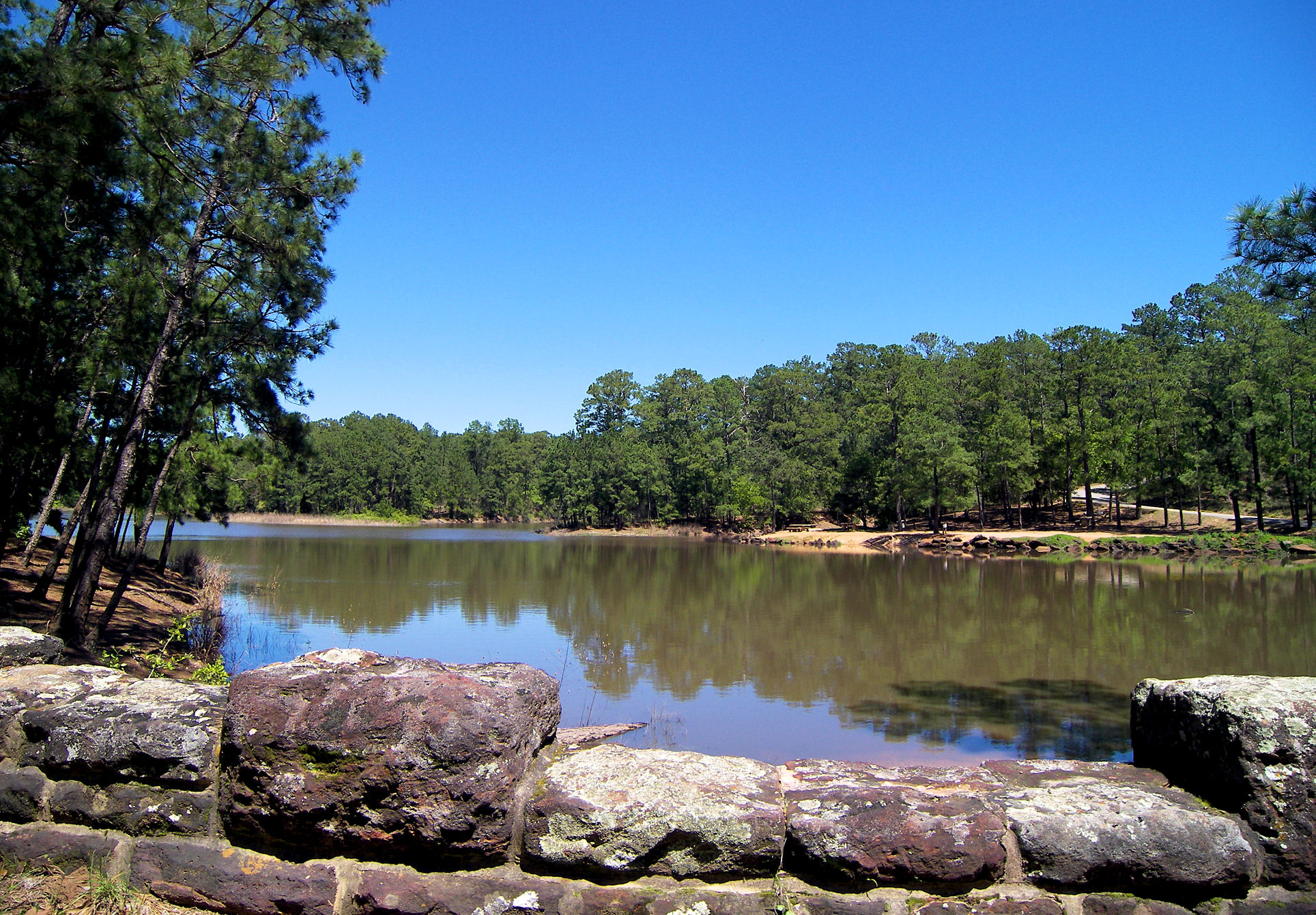
Bastrop State Park

The Austin area has long been known for its outdoor attractions and is home to numerous parks and nature preserves.

Major parks within the City of Austin include McKinney Falls State Park, Emma Long Metropolitan Park, Zilker Park, and Hippie Hollow Park. Mount Bonnell Park is a popular destination, located at one of the highest points in the city. Outside of the Austin various other parks, including Bastrop State Park, Lockhart State Park, and Longhorn Cavern State Park, are available. Further from the area's core is the Enchanted Rock State Natural Area, a 640-acre (260 ha) park near Fredericksburg featuring a large granite mound that is popular with hikers and climbers. Additionally Pedernales Falls State Park in Johnson City, and Inks Lake State Park in Burnet, are among the many other parks available in Central Texas.

The largest nature preserve in the area is the Balcones Canyonlands National Wildlife Refuge, a preserve northwest of Austin near Burnet and Marble Falls comprising 21,436 acres (8,675 ha). Other preserves in the area include the Wild Basin Wilderness Preserve, the Louis René Barrera Indiangrass Wildlife Sanctuary, and the Onion Creek Wildlife Sanctuary. These preserves are all part of the Heart of Texas Wildlife Trail, a network of trails and sites for viewing wildlife habitats, created by the Texas Parks and Wildlife Department.

== Education ==
=== Universities and colleges ===
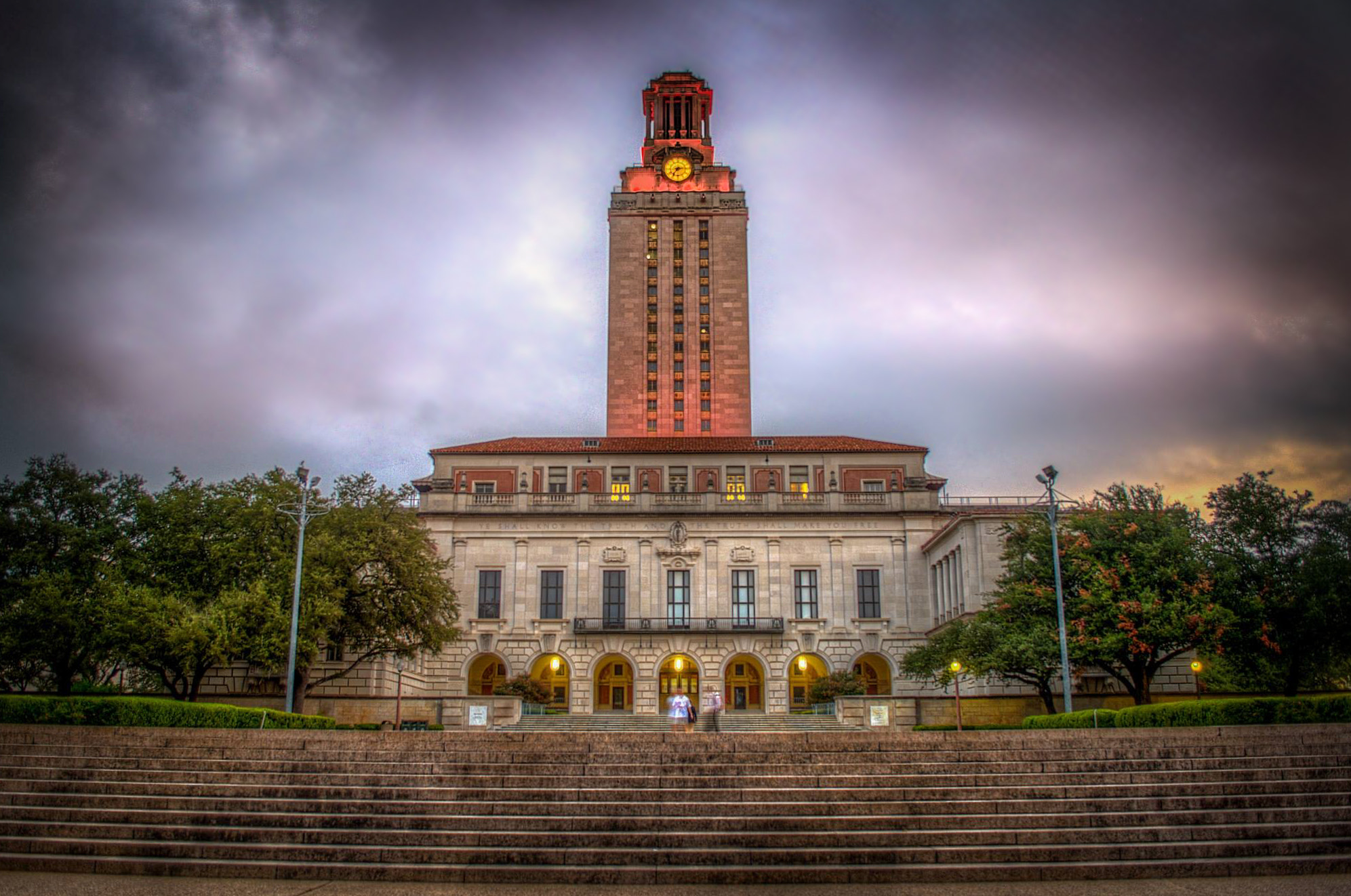
University of Texas at Austin

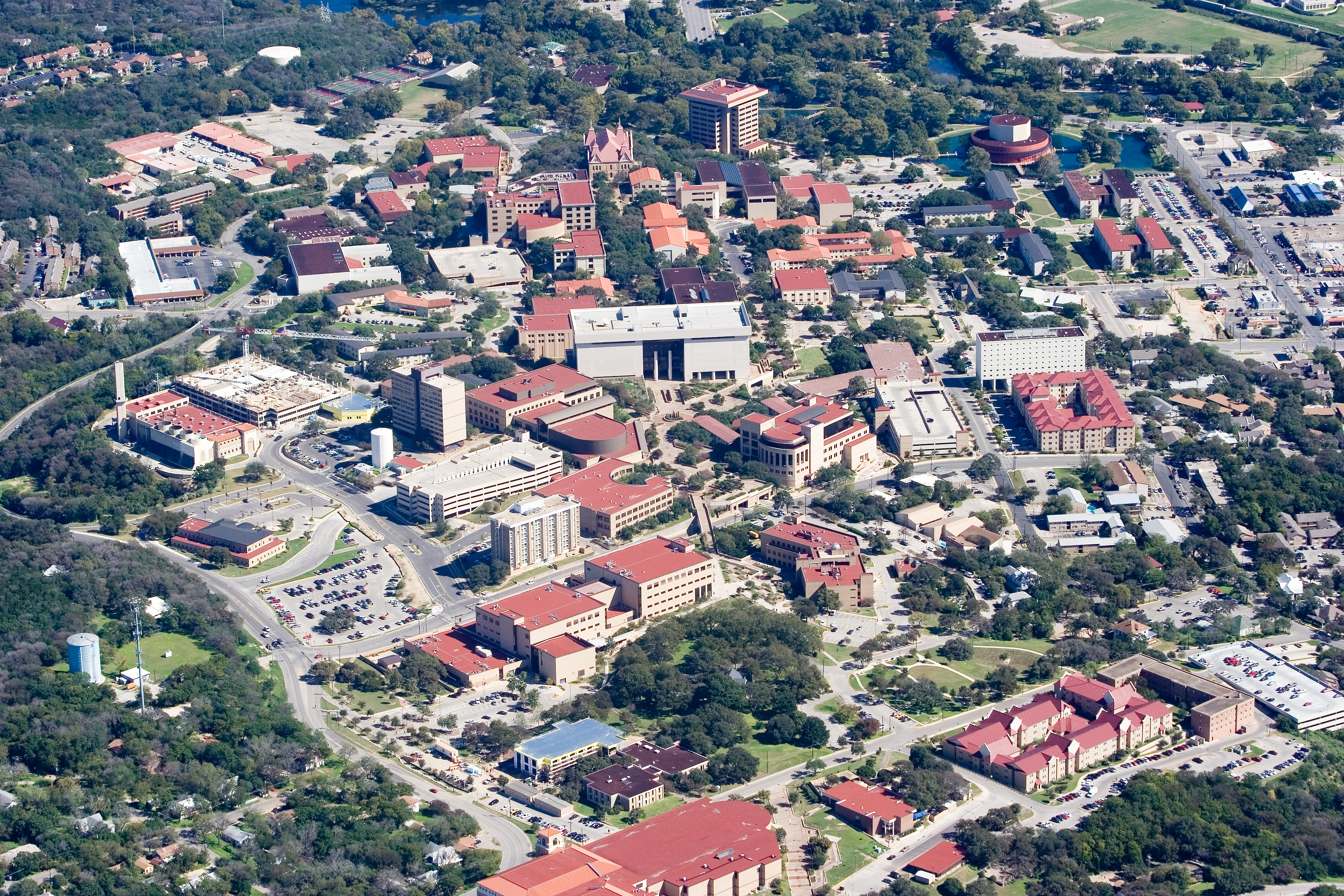
Texas State University

The region contains numerous universities. Major area universities include the University of Texas at Austin (flagship of the University of Texas System), Texas State University (flagship of the Texas State University System), and Southwestern University (Georgetown). The city of Austin itself contains numerous other institutions of higher education including Austin Presbyterian Theological Seminary, Concordia University, Huston–Tillotson University, St. Edward's University, Austin Community College, and others. Additional institutions in the suburban communities include Temple College in Taylor and the Texas State University extension in Round Rock.

In 2006, 35% of adults in the City of Austin held college degrees, placing fourth among the 77 largest cities in the U.S. As of 2010 this percentage had climbed to 43.3%. In Round Rock 37.2% of adults held degrees, in Pflugerville 40.50% held degrees, in Cedar Park 39.1% held degrees, and in San Marcos 34.1% held degrees. This compares to 23.2% for all of Texas and 24.4% for the entire U.S. making the Austin area one of the most educated metropolitan areas in the U.S.

=== Primary and secondary ===
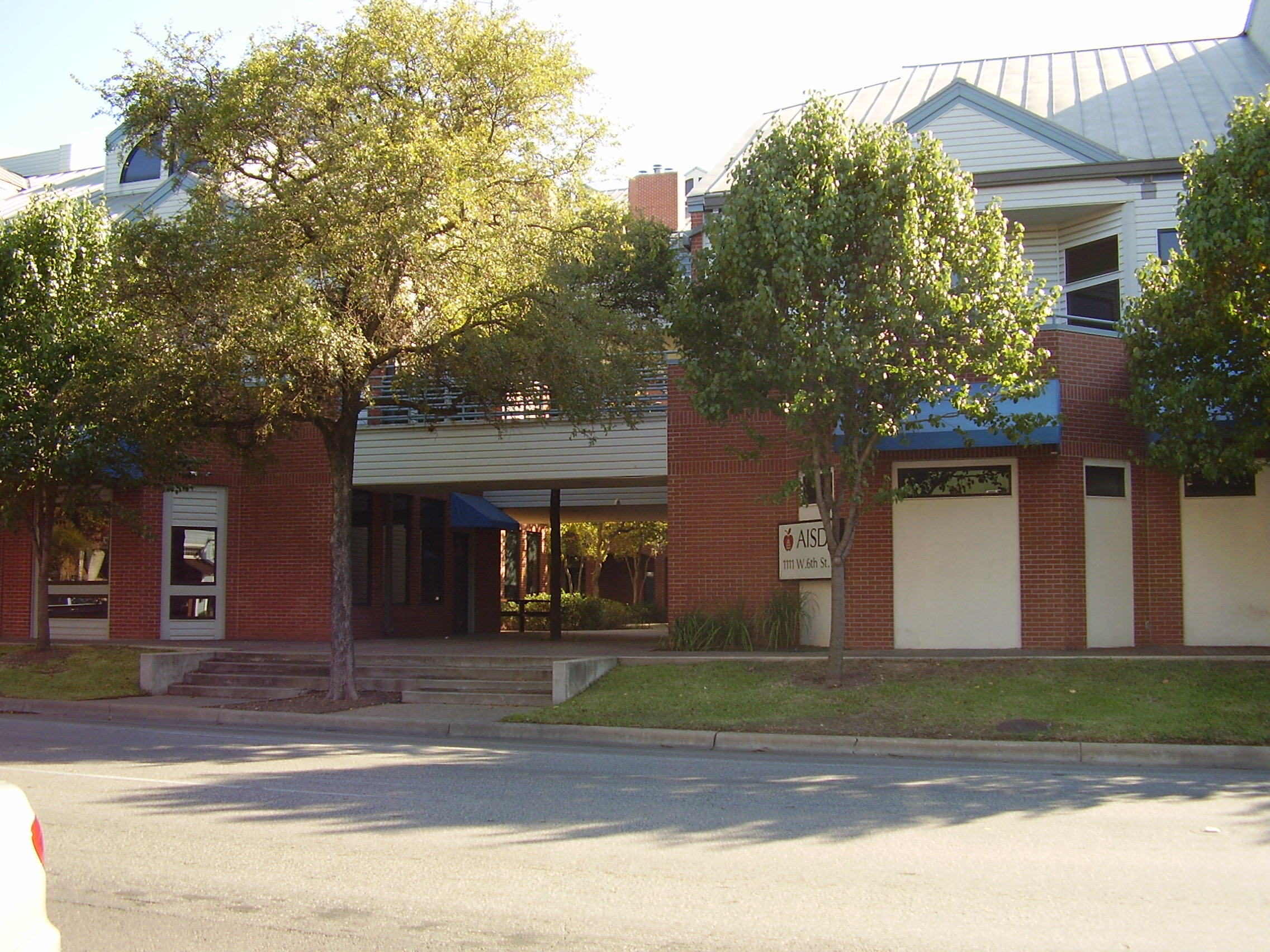
Austin Independent School District headquarters

The region is served by numerous school districts. As of 2010 the Greater Austin Chamber of Commerce lists 29 public school districts, 17 charter schools, and 69 private schools.

The Chamber lists as the primary districts Austin ISD, Bastrop ISD, Del Valle ISD, Eanes ISD, Georgetown ISD, Hays CISD, Lake Travis ISD, Leander ISD, Pflugerville ISD, and Round Rock ISD. Adding to this list the San Marcos Consolidated Independent School District, there are a total of 11 core districts. As of 2009 the Texas Education Agency ranks one district, Eanes, as "Exemplary", the highest rating. Three districts, Del Valle, Leander, and Round Rock, are ranked as "Recognized", the second highest rating. All of the others are ranked as "Academically Acceptable". These 12 districts operate 330 individual schools. Of these schools 98 (30%) are ranked as "Exemplary", and 87 (26%) are ranked as "Recognized".

Major private schools in the area include Redeemer Lutheran School, Brentwood Christian School, Hill Country Christian School, Hyde Park Baptist School, the Regents School, Round Rock Christian Academy (Round Rock), Summit Christian Academy (Leander), St. Andrew's Episcopal School, and St. Michael's Academy.

== Transportation ==
=== Highways ===
The principal highways in the metropolitan area are Interstate 35 and the MoPac Expressway (State Highway Loop 1), both of which are the primary north–south roadways. Other important arteries in the city and its immediate vicinity are U.S. Highway 183 (also known as "Research Blvd."), and U.S. Highway 290 which provide East/West thoroughfares. Other important highways include State Highway 71 (also known as "Ben White Blvd.") which connects Austin with Houston to the south, and to Marble Falls and the Highland Lakes chain to the west. And State Highway Loop 360 is a scenic highway which runs to the north–south on the west side of Austin but curves westward into the hills. Loop 360 carries special scenic zoning as well preventing billboards and minimizing views of the surrounding buildings. Austin's new toll roads include State Highway 130, U.S. Highway 183, and State Highway 45 discussed below. Interstate 10 also runs through the extreme southern portion of Caldwell County.

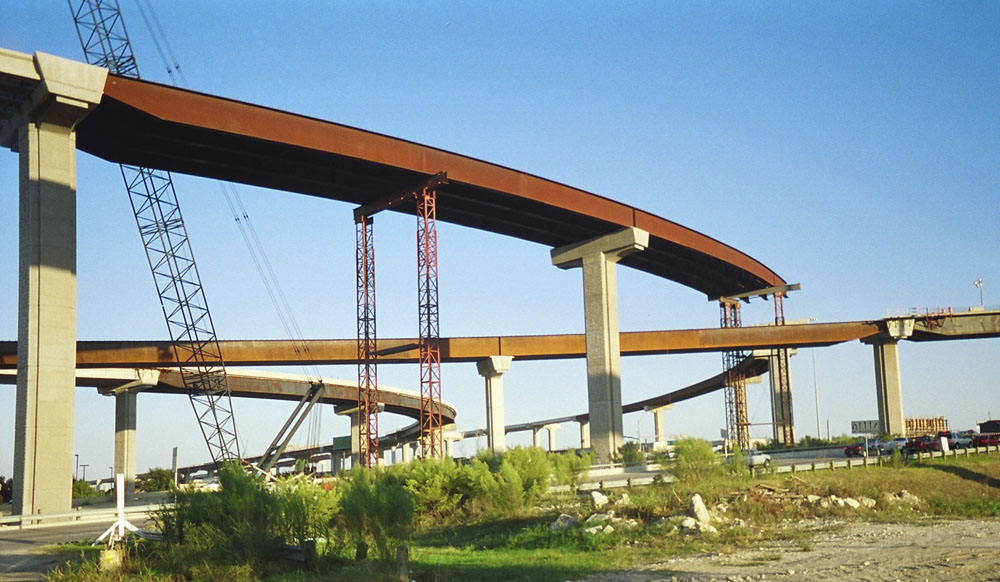
Interchange of Interstate 35 and State Highway 45 under construction in 2004.

In November 2006, the Central Texas Regional Mobility Authority (CTRMA) opened the first segment of the region's first toll road system. Both State Highway 130 and State Highway 45 toll roads run through portions of Austin and provide greatly increased mobility to the city. State Highway 130 prior to 2013 ran just south of Austin Bergstrom International Airport at US Highway 183 and ended at Interstate 35 north of Georgetown. It provides mobility and access to the easternmost part of Austin and Travis County, and allows residents in Williamson County easy access to the airport. This project, completed in October 2012, now ends at Interstate 10 just east of Seguin, about 30 miles east-northeast of San Antonio. The speed limit on the newly completed stretch is the highest in the United States, but not the first is Texas as I-10 has had an 85 mph speed limit for decades, at 85 mph (137 km/h).

SH 45 was built on a fast-track basis with bonds sold in advance based on the projected toll revenues.

State Highway 45 is part of an eventual partial loop that runs east from U.S. Highway 183 in Cedar Park to State Highway 130 at Pflugerville (east of Round Rock) where it merges with the SH 130 toll road, and then intersects with the southern portion of SH 45 near Buda, south of Austin. SH 45 is one of the very few East/West connectors in Austin, but it also connects to a tolled extension of Loop 1 (also known locally as the "Mopac Expressway") and allows direct access from to I-35 to Loop 1 by use of flyover connections rather than ground level intersections. The toll roads also provide access to the Dell headquarters and its approximately 16,000 employees. Despite the overwhelming initial opposition to the toll road concept, both toll roads have improved mobility in and around the Austin area and are significantly exceeding their revenue projections.

=== Public transportation ===
The metro area is served by buses of the Capital Metropolitan Transportation Authority (Capital Metro). Capital Metro operates 48 fixed-route, 1 flex-route, and eight express bus services within the city of Austin and several nearby suburbs in Travis and Williamson counties. Capital Metro also operates the shuttles of the University of Texas, which provides limited-stop services to and from neighborhoods where many university students reside. A commuter rail service—the Red line of Capital MetroRail—began service on March 22, 2010, connecting Downtown Austin with the city of Leander.

The region's primary airport is Austin-Bergstrom International Airport.

== Politics ==
Presidential election results
Year	DEM	GOP	Others
2024	59.4% 634,882	39.0% 416,716	1.7% 18,012
2020	62.5% 661,325	35.6% 377,293	1.9% 19,836
2016	56.3% 441,316	36.7% 288,229	7.0% 54,966
2012	51.9% 334,855	44.8% 288,873	3.3% 21,160
2008	56.3% 367,229	42.1% 274,866	1.6% 10,640
2004	48.9% 275,308	49.3% 277,916	1.8% 9,937
2000	37.8% 174,349	52.7% 241,972	9.3% 42,927
1996	48.5% 175,459	43.6% 157,717	8.0% 28,893
1992	44.1% 170,871	34.1% 132,050	21.8% 84,653
1988	52.2% 171,212	47.1% 154,497	0.8% 2,517
1984	40.5% 118,843	59.2% 173,939	0.3% 885
1980	45.8% 99,320	47.6% 103,350	6.6% 14,305
1976	53.0% 103,380	45.5% 88,844	1.5% 2,999
1972	42.3% 65,911	57.2% 89,233	4.8% 741
1968	49.8% 54,317	38.6% 42,082	11.6% 12,674
1964	71.4% 62,760	28.5% 25,059	0.1% 83
1960	58.5% 40,943	41.2% 28,832	0.3% 190

Politically, Greater Austin leans toward the Democratic Party, though it has voted Republican in the past, such as during Texan George W. Bush's presidential victories in 2000 and 2004. However, at a local level, Austin has only two Democrats, Lloyd Doggett and Greg Casar, representing any part of it in Congress.

== See also ==
- List of cities in Texas
- Texas census statistical areas
- List of Texas metropolitan areas
- Silicon Hills
- Texas Triangle
