= Texas's 31st congressional district =

U.S. House district for Texas

Coordinates: 30°49′44″N 97°32′08″W

- Interactive map of district boundaries
- Representative: John Carter; R–Round Rock
- Distribution: 86.1% urban; 13.9% rural
- Population (2025): 934,642
- Median household income: $96,438
- Ethnicity: 59.1% White; 23.1% Hispanic; 7.5% Black; 4.7% Two or more races; 4.6% Asian; 1.1% other
- Cook PVI: R+11

Texas's 31st congressional district of the United States House of Representatives covers a strip of Central Texas from the northern Austin suburbs up to Temple and Gatesville.

The district is centered around Bell and Williamson counties, two fast-growing suburban counties north of Austin; it includes the Williamson County portion of Austin itself. It also includes much of the area surrounding Fort Hood, giving the district a strong military presence, as well as four rural counties to the north and west of the district.

John Carter has served as the representative from this district since its creation. The 31st district is one of only two districts in Texas (the other being the 36th district) that has never been represented by a member of the Democratic Party.

== Recent election results from statewide races ==
=== 2023–2027 boundaries ===
Year	Office	Results
2008	President	McCain 64% - 36%
2012	President	Romney 69% - 31%
2014	Senate	Cornyn 74% - 26%
2014	Governor	Abbott 71% - 29%
2016	President	Trump 62% - 32%
2018	Senate	Cruz 60% - 39%
2018	Governor	Abbott 65% - 33%
2018	Lt. Governor	Patrick 60% - 37%
2018	Attorney General	Paxton 59% - 38%
2018	Comptroller of Public Accounts	Hegar 63% - 33%
2020	President	Trump 59% - 39%
2020	Senate	Cornyn 61% - 37%
2022	Governor	Abbott 61% - 37%
2022	Lt. Governor	Patrick 60% - 37%
2022	Attorney General	Paxton 59% - 37%
2022	Comptroller of Public Accounts	Hegar 63% - 35%
2024	President	Trump 61% - 38%
2024	Senate	Cruz 58% - 39%

=== 2027–2033 boundaries ===
Year	Office	Results
2008	President	McCain 61% - 39%
2012	President	Romney 65% - 35%
2014	Senate	Cornyn 73% - 27%
2014	Governor	Abbott 70% - 30%
2016	President	Trump 60% - 34%
2018	Senate	Cruz 59% - 40%
2018	Governor	Abbott 64% - 34%
2018	Lt. Governor	Patrick 59% - 38%
2018	Attorney General	Paxton 59% - 38%
2018	Comptroller of Public Accounts	Hegar 62% - 35%
2020	President	Trump 58% - 40%
2020	Senate	Cornyn 59% - 38%
2022	Governor	Abbott 61% - 37%
2022	Lt. Governor	Patrick 60% - 37%
2022	Attorney General	Paxton 59% - 37%
2022	Comptroller of Public Accounts	Hegar 63% - 35%
2024	President	Trump 60% - 38%
2024	Senate	Cruz 58% - 40%
2026	Senate	Paxton 48.8% - 48.5%
2026	Governor	Abbott 52% - 46%

== Current composition ==
For the 118th and successive Congresses (based on redistricting following the 2020 census), the district contains all or portions of the following counties and communities:

Bell County (14)

Bartlett (shared with Williamson County), Belton, Fort Hood (part; also 11th; shared with Coryell County), Harker Heights (part; also 11th), Holland, Killeen (part; also 11th), Little River-Academy, Morgan's Point Resort, Nolanville, Pendleton, Rogers, Salado, Temple, Troy

Bosque County (10)

All 10 communities

Burnet County (9)

All 9 communities

Coryell County (9)

All 9 communities

Hamilton County (5)

All 5 communities

Williamson County (17)

Bartlett (shared with Bell County), Brushy Creek (part; also 10th and 37th), Cedar Park (part; also 21st; shared with Travis County), Florence, Georgetown, Granger, Hutto (part; also 17th), Jarrell, Leander (part; also 21st; shared with Travis County), Liberty Hill, Round Rock (part; also 17th), Santa Rita Ranch, Serenada, Sonterra, Taylor, Thrall (part; also 17th), Weir

== Future composition ==
Beginning with the 2026 election, the 31st district will consist of the following counties:

- Bell (part)
- Burnet (part)
- Coryell
- Hamilton
- Lampasas
- Mills
- Williamson (part)

== List of representatives ==
Representative	Party	Years	Cong ress	Electoral history	District boundaries
District established January 3, 2003
John Carter (Round Rock)	Republican	January 3, 2003 – present	108th 109th 110th 111th 112th 113th 114th 115th 116th 117th 118th 119th	Elected in 2002. Re-elected in 2004. Re-elected in 2006. Re-elected in 2008. Re-elected in 2010. Re-elected in 2012. Re-elected in 2014. Re-elected in 2016. Re-elected in 2018. Re-elected in 2020. Re-elected in 2022. Re-elected in 2024. Re-elected in 2026.	2003–2005; Austin, Bastrop, Brazos, Burleson, Harris, Lee, Waller, Washington, and Williamson
John Carter (Round Rock)	Republican	January 3, 2003 – present	108th 109th 110th 111th 112th 113th 114th 115th 116th 117th 118th 119th	Elected in 2002. Re-elected in 2004. Re-elected in 2006. Re-elected in 2008. Re-elected in 2010. Re-elected in 2012. Re-elected in 2014. Re-elected in 2016. Re-elected in 2018. Re-elected in 2020. Re-elected in 2022. Re-elected in 2024. Re-elected in 2026.	2005–2013 Bell, Coryell, Erath, Falls, Hamilton, Milam, Robertson (part), and Williamson (part)
John Carter (Round Rock)	Republican	January 3, 2003 – present	108th 109th 110th 111th 112th 113th 114th 115th 116th 117th 118th 119th	Elected in 2002. Re-elected in 2004. Re-elected in 2006. Re-elected in 2008. Re-elected in 2010. Re-elected in 2012. Re-elected in 2014. Re-elected in 2016. Re-elected in 2018. Re-elected in 2020. Re-elected in 2022. Re-elected in 2024. Re-elected in 2026.	2013–2023 Bell (part) and Williamson
John Carter (Round Rock)	Republican	January 3, 2003 – present	108th 109th 110th 111th 112th 113th 114th 115th 116th 117th 118th 119th	Elected in 2002. Re-elected in 2004. Re-elected in 2006. Re-elected in 2008. Re-elected in 2010. Re-elected in 2012. Re-elected in 2014. Re-elected in 2016. Re-elected in 2018. Re-elected in 2020. Re-elected in 2022. Re-elected in 2024. Re-elected in 2026.	2023–present Bell (part), Bosque, Burnet, Coryell, Hamilton, and Williamson (part)

== Recent election results ==
2004 election: Texas District 31
Party	Candidate	Votes	%	±%
Republican	John Carter (incumbent)	160,247	64.8	▼4.3
Democratic	Jon Porter	80,292	32.5	▲5.1
Libertarian	Celeste Adams	6,888	2.8	▲1.5
Majority		79,955	32.3	
Turnout		247,427		
Republican hold		Swing	-4.7	

2006 election: Texas District 31
Party	Candidate	Votes	%	±%
Republican	John Carter (incumbent)	94,242	58	▼6.8
Democratic	Mary Beth Harrell	62,761	39	▲6.5
Libertarian	Matt McAdoo	4,370	3	▲0.2
Majority		31,481	19	▼13.3
Turnout		161,373		▼34.8
Republican hold		Swing	-6.7	

2008 election: Texas District 31
Party	Candidate	Votes	%	±%
Republican	John Carter (incumbent)	175,563	60.3	▲2.3
Democratic	Brian P. Ruiz	106,559	36.6	▼3.6
Libertarian	Barry N. Cooper	9,182	3.2	▲0.2
Majority		69,004	23.7	▲4.7
Turnout		291,304		▲80.5
Republican hold		Swing		

2010 election: Texas District 31
Party	Candidate	Votes	%	±%
Republican	John Carter (incumbent)	126,384	82.6	▲20.3
Libertarian	Bill Oliver	26,735	17.5	▲14.3
Majority		99,649	65.1	▲41.4
Turnout		153,119		▼47.4
Republican hold		Swing		

2012 election: Texas District 31
Party	Candidate	Votes	%	±%
Republican	John Carter (incumbent)	145,348	61.3	▼22.3
Democratic	Stephen M. Wyman	82,977	35.0	▲35.0
Libertarian	Ethan Garofolo	8,862	3.7	▼13.8
Majority		82,587	34.8	▼30.3
Turnout		237,187		▲54.9
Republican hold		Swing		

2014 election: Texas District 31
Party	Candidate	Votes	%	±%
Republican	John Carter (incumbent)	91,484	64.1	▼
Democratic	Louie Minor	45,634	32.0	▲
Libertarian	Scott Ballard	5,693	4.0	▼
Majority		45,850		▼
Turnout		142,811	18	▼
Republican hold		Swing		

2016 election: Texas District 31
Party	Candidate	Votes	%	±%
Republican	John Carter (incumbent)	166,060	58.4	▼5.7
Democratic	Mike Clark	103,852	36.5	▲4.5
Libertarian	Scott Ballard	14,676	5.2	▲1.2
Majority		62,208		▲
Turnout		284,588	35	▲17
Republican hold		Swing		

2018 election: Texas District 31
Party	Candidate	Votes	%	±%
Republican	John Carter (incumbent)	144,680	50.6	▼7.8
Democratic	MJ Hegar	136,362	47.7	▲11.2
Libertarian	Jason Hope	4,965	1.7	▼3.5
Majority		8,318	2.9	▼18.9
Turnout		286,007		▲
Republican hold		Swing		

2020 election: Texas District 31
Party	Candidate	Votes	%	±%
Republican	John Carter (incumbent)	212,695	53.5	▲2.9
Democratic	Donna Imam	176,293	44.3	▼3.4
Libertarian	Clark Patterson	8,922	2.2	▲0.5
Majority		36,402	9.2	▲6.3
Turnout		397,910	100	
Republican hold		Swing	28.1	

2022 election: Texas District 31
Party	Candidate	Votes	%
Republican	John Carter (incumbent)	183,185	100
Total votes		183,185	100
Republican hold			

2024 election: Texas District 31
Party	Candidate	Votes	%
Republican	John Carter (incumbent)	228,520	64.5
Democratic	Stuart Whitlow	125,959	35.5
Total votes		354,479	100.0
Republican hold			

== Historical district boundaries ==
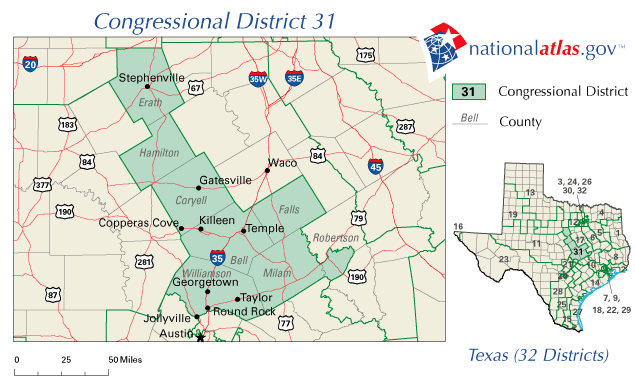
2007–2013

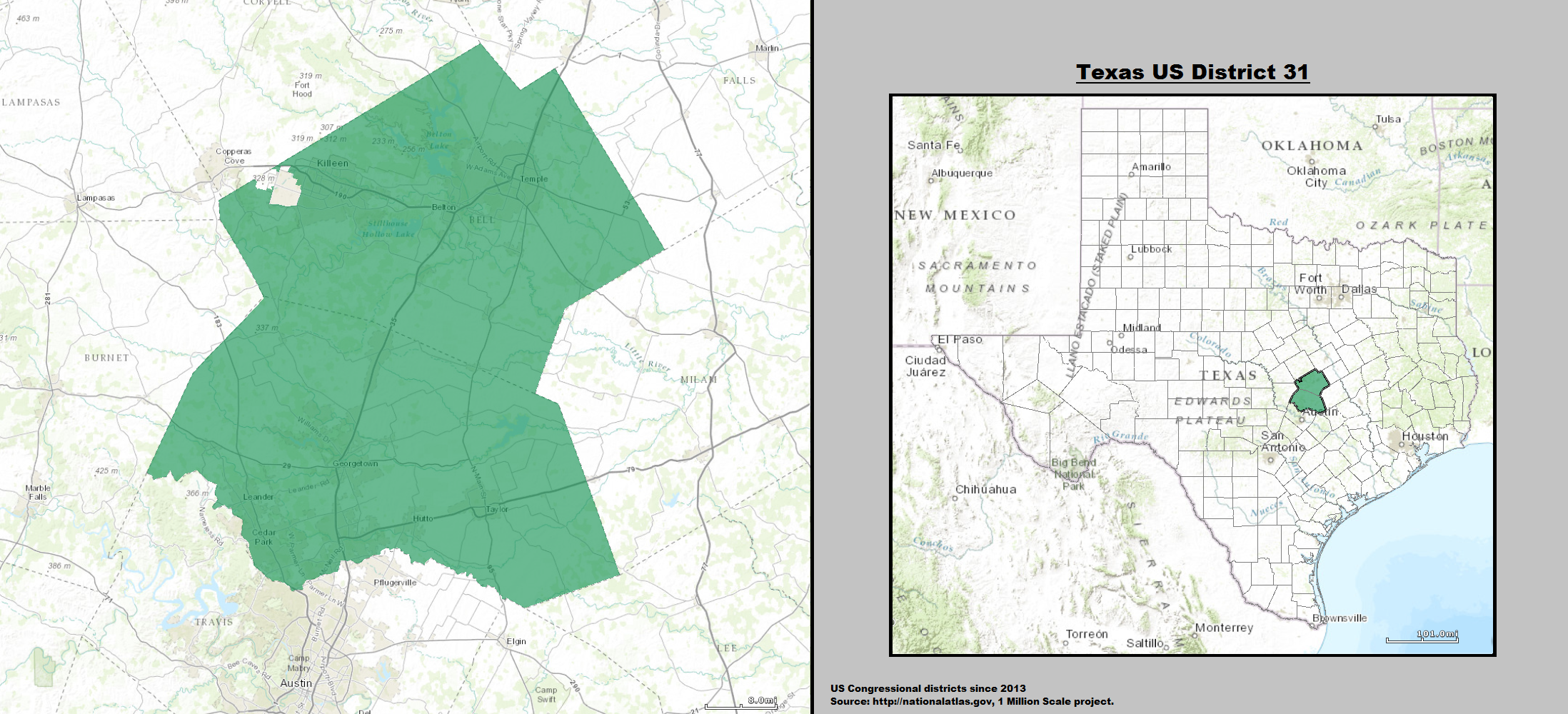
2013–2023

== See also ==
- List of United States congressional districts
