= Texas's 37th congressional district =

U.S. House district for Texas

- Interactive map of district boundaries
- Representative: Lloyd Doggett; D–Austin
- Population (2025): 805,879
- Median household income: $96,568
- Ethnicity: 52.5% White; 27.4% Hispanic; 9.8% Asian; 5.5% Black; 4.1% Two or more races; 0.8% other
- Cook PVI: D+26

Texas's 37th congressional district of the United States House of Representatives was created as a result of the 2020 census. The district is contained predominantly in Travis County with a small portion of southern Williamson County, and consists of the majority of the city of Austin as well as small areas of its suburbs. It is represented by Lloyd Doggett.

From 1903 to 2005, the Austin area had been covered solely by Texas's 10th congressional district. It initially covered all of Travis County and areas from surrounding counties, but steadily shrank over time with Austin's explosive growth in the second half of the 20th century. By the 1990s, it had shrunk to Austin itself and its innermost suburbs. From 2005, the Austin area was partitioned between several congressional districts, and the 10th's then-incumbent representative, Democrat Lloyd Doggett, was forced to move first to the 25th district from 2005–13 and then to the 35th district from 2013–23, both of which contained both a portion of Austin and an extensive area outside of it.

After eighteen years of there being no Austin-centered district, the 37th district was created as of 2023, centered on the Austin area as the pre-2005 10th district had been.

== Recent election results from statewide races ==
=== 2023–2027 boundaries ===
Year	Office	Results
2008	President	Obama 66% - 33%
2012	President	Obama 65% - 35%
2014	Senate	Alameel 63% - 37%
2014	Governor	Davis 68% - 32%
2016	President	Clinton 69% - 24%
2018	Senate	O'Rourke 78% - 21%
2018	Governor	Valdez 70% - 27%
2018	Lt. Governor	Collier 74% - 23%
2018	Attorney General	Nelson 75% - 22%
2018	Comptroller of Public Accounts	Chevalier 70% - 26%
2020	President	Biden 75% - 23%
2020	Senate	Hegar 72% - 26%
2022	Governor	O'Rourke 77% - 21%
2022	Lt. Governor	Collier 77% - 20%
2022	Attorney General	Mercedes Garza 77% - 20%
2022	Comptroller of Public Accounts	Dudding 72% - 25%
2024	President	Harris 73% - 24%
2024	Senate	Allred 75% - 22%

=== 2027–2033 boundaries ===
Year	Office	Results
2008	President	Obama 73% - 26%
2012	President	Obama 73% - 27%
2014	Senate	Alameel 72% - 28%
2014	Governor	Davis 76% - 24%
2016	President	Clinton 75% - 18%
2018	Senate	O'Rourke 83% - 16%
2018	Governor	Valdez 76% - 21%
2018	Lt. Governor	Collier 80% - 17%
2018	Attorney General	Nelson 81% - 16%
2018	Comptroller of Public Accounts	Chevalier 76% - 19%
2020	President	Biden 80% - 18%
2020	Senate	Hegar 77% - 20%
2022	Governor	O'Rourke 82% - 16%
2022	Lt. Governor	Collier 81% - 16%
2022	Attorney General	Mercedes Garza 82% - 15%
2022	Comptroller of Public Accounts	Dudding 77% - 19%
2024	President	Harris 77% - 21%
2024	Senate	Allred 79% - 18%
2026	Senate	Talarico 86% - 12%
2026	Governor	Hinojosa 84% - 15%

== Current composition ==
For the 118th and successive Congresses (based on redistricting following the 2020 census), the district contains all or portions of the following counties and communities:

Travis County (11)

Austin (part; also 10th, 21st, and 35th; shared with Hays and Williamson counties), Lost Creek, Manchaca, Pflugerville (part; also 10th, 17th, and 35th; shared with Williamson County), Rollingwood, San Leanna, Shady Hollow, Steiner Ranch (part; also 10th), Sunset Valley, Wells Branch (part; also 10th), West Lake Hills

Williamson County (2)

Austin (part; also 10th, 21st, and 35th; shared with Hays and Travis counties), Brushy Creek (part; also 10th and 31st)

== Future composition ==
Beginning with the 2026 election, the 37th district will consist of the following counties:

- Travis (part)

== List of members representing the district ==
Representative (Residence)	Party	Years	Cong ress	Electoral history	District location
District established January 3, 2023
Lloyd Doggett (Austin)	Democratic	January 3, 2023 – present	118th 119th	Redistricted from the 35th district and re-elected in 2022. Re-elected in 2024. Retiring at the end of term.	2023–2027 Parts of Travis and Williamson
Greg Casar (Austin)	Democratic	Assuming office on January 3, 2027		Redistricted from the 35th district and re-elected in 2026.	2027–present Parts of Travis

== Election results ==
=== 2022 ===
2022 Texas's 37th congressional district election
Party	Candidate	Votes	%
Democratic	Lloyd Doggett (incumbent)	219,358	76.7
Republican	Jenny Sharon	59,923	20.9
Libertarian	Clark Patterson	6,332	2.2
Write-in	Sherri Taylor	176	0.06
Total votes		285,789	100.0
Democratic win (new seat)			

=== 2024 ===
2024 Texas's 37th congressional district election
Party	Candidate	Votes	%
Democratic	Lloyd Doggett (incumbent)	252,442	75.9
Republican	Jenny Garcia Sharon	80,267	24.1
Total votes		332,709	100.0
Democratic hold			

== See also ==
- Texas's congressional districts
- List of United States congressional districts
