= Togo, Texas =

- Unincorporated community
- Location within Texas Location within the United States
- Coordinates: 29°57′02″N 97°13′09″W
- Country: United States
- State: Texas
- County: Bastrop
- Elevation: 466 ft (142 m)
- Time zone: UTC-6 (Central (CST))
  - Summer (DST): UTC-5 (CDT)
- Area codes: 512 & 737
- GNIS feature ID: 1380668

Togo is an unincorporated community in Bastrop County, Texas, United States.

== School ==
Togo is served by the Smithville Independent School District.
