= San Leanna, Texas =

- Village
- Location of San Leanna, Texas
- Coordinates: 30°08′39″N 97°49′10″W
- Country: United States
- State: Texas
- County: Travis

Area
  - Total: 0.44 sq mi (1.15 km^{2})
  - Land: 0.44 sq mi (1.15 km^{2})
  - Water: 0 sq mi (0.00 km^{2})
- Elevation: 686 ft (209 m)

Population (2020)
  - Total: 522
  - Density: 1,180/sq mi (454/km^{2})
- Time zone: UTC-6 (Central (CST))
  - Summer (DST): UTC-5 (CDT)
- ZIP code: 78748 and 78652
- Area code: 512
- FIPS code: 48-65552
- GNIS feature ID: 2413588
- Website: sanleannatx.com

San Leanna is a village in Travis County, Texas, United States. The population was 522 at the 2020 census.

== History ==
San Leanna began as a subdivision in Travis County in the 1950s. In 1970, San Leanna incorporated with a mayor-alderman government. In 1974, San Leanna had 200 people. In 1988, San Leanna's population was 297. In 1990, the village had 325 people.

== Geography ==
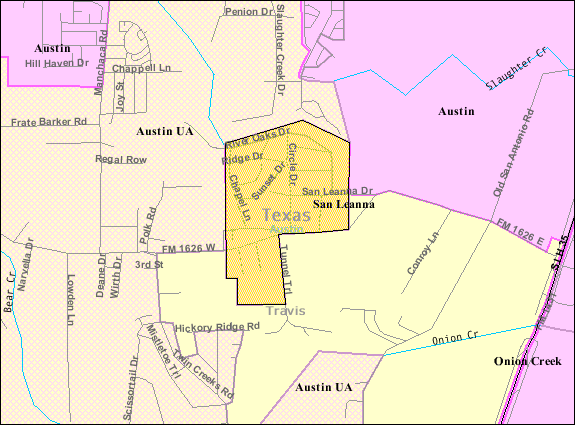
Map of San Leanna

San Leanna is located 10 miles (16 km) south of downtown Austin.

According to the United States Census Bureau, the village has a total area of 0.4 square mile (1.0 km^{2}), all land.

== Demographics ==
Historical population
| Census | Pop. | Note | %± |
|---|---|---|---|
| 1980 | 290 | | — |
| 1990 | 325 | | 12.1% |
| 2000 | 384 | | 18.2% |
| 2010 | 497 | | 29.4% |
| 2020 | 522 | | 5.0% |
U.S. Decennial Census

As of the census of 2000, there were 384 people, 148 households, and 117 families residing in the village. The population density was 998.2 inhabitants per square mile (385.4/km^{2}). There were 153 housing units at an average density of 397.7 per square mile (153.6/km^{2}). The racial makeup of the village was 90.62% White, 0.78% African American, 0.52% Asian, 5.73% from other races, and 2.34% from two or more races. Hispanic or Latino of any race were 12.50% of the population.

There were 148 households, out of which 33.1% had children under the age of 18 living with them, 66.9% were married couples living together, 8.1% had a female householder with no husband present, and 20.9% were non-families. 16.9% of all households were made up of individuals, and 6.1% had someone living alone who was 65 years of age or older. The average household size was 2.59 and the average family size was 2.90.

In the village, the population was spread out, with 24.2% under the age of 18, 4.4% from 18 to 24, 24.7% from 25 to 44, 34.1% from 45 to 64, and 12.5% who were 65 years of age or older. The median age was 44 years. For every 100 females, there were 102.1 males. For every 100 females age 18 and over, there were 98.0 males.

The median income for a household in the village was $65,893, and the median income for a family was $69,688. Males had a median income of $43,929 versus $45,000 for females. The per capita income for the village was $26,929. About 1.7% of families and 4.5% of the population were below the poverty line, including none of those under age 18 and 8.9% of those age 65 or over.

== Government and infrastructure ==
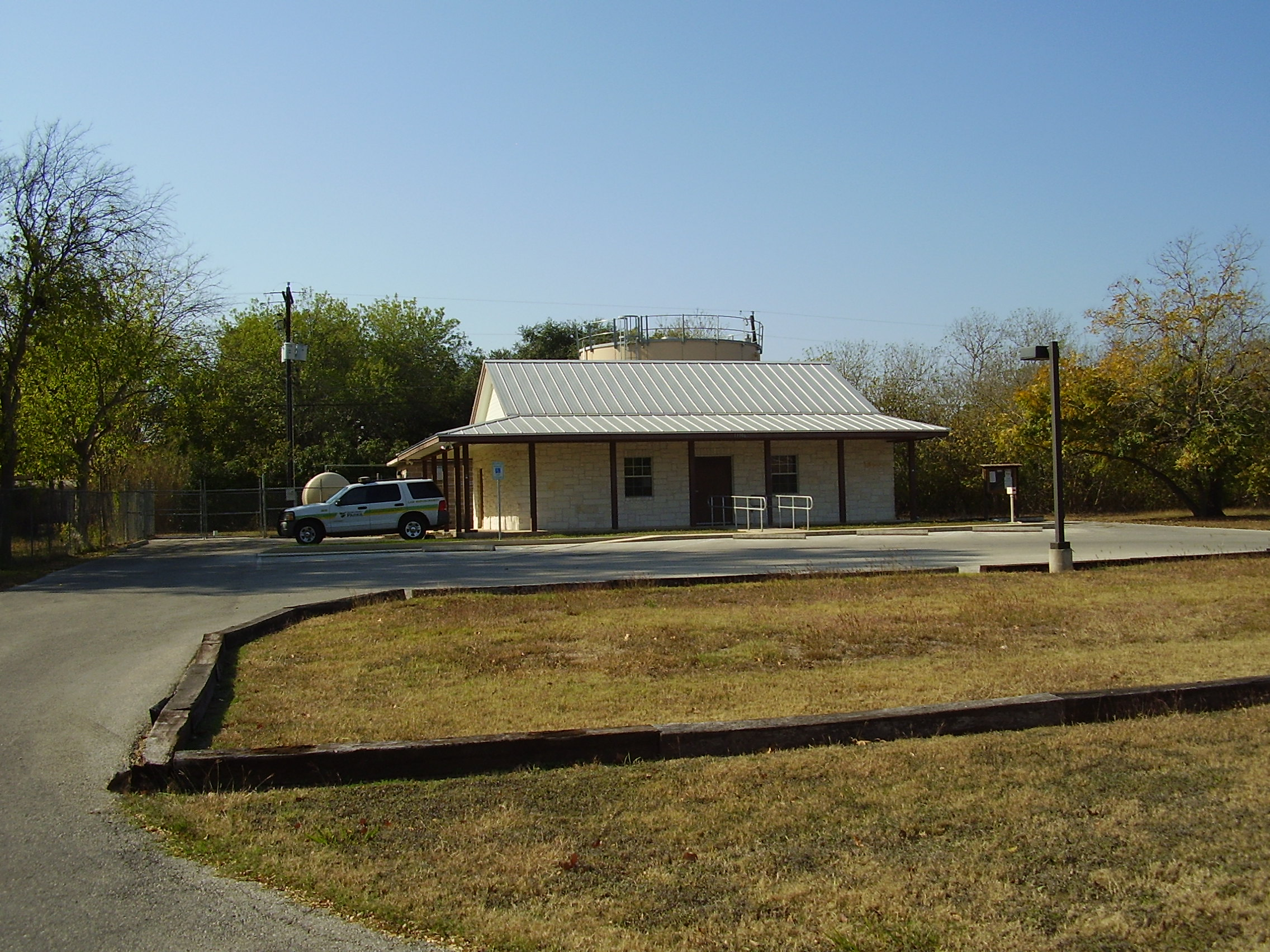
San Leanna Community Center

As of 2025 the mayor of San Leanna is Molly Quirk. The aldermen are Danny Villarreal (Mayor Pro-Tem), Mary Wright, Helen Rockenbaugh, and Jonathan Fein. Rebecca Howe is the Village Administrator and can be contacted for water connections. Mark Schumacher is the zoning chairperson. Byron Townsend is the water operator, and Cahir Doherty is the arborist. San Leanna has a zoning ordinance governing usage of land.

Manchaca Fire/ Rescue (ESD #5), headquartered in an unincorporated area of Travis County, provides San Leanna with fire protection. The community is within Travis County Precinct 3.

San Leanna is located in District 47 of the Texas House of Representatives. As of 2016 Paul Workman represents the district. San Leanna is within District 25 of the Texas Senate. As of 2016 Donna Campbell represents the district.

San Leanna is in Texas's 37th congressional district; as of 2026 Lloyd Doggett is the representative.

== Education ==
San Leanna is within the Austin Independent School District. Residents are zoned to Menchaca Elementary School in unincorporated Travis County, Paredes Middle School in Austin, and Akins High School in Austin. Menchaca Elementary School was built in 1977. Paredes Middle School opened in January 2000. Akins High School opened in August 2000.
