= Windermere, Texas =

- Neighborhood of Pflugerville; Former Census designated place
- Coordinates: 30°27′29″N 97°39′38″W
- Country: United States
- State: Texas
- County: Travis

Area
  - Total: 0.53 sq mi (1.37 km^{2})
  - Land: 0.53 sq mi (1.37 km^{2})
  - Water: 0 sq mi (0.0 km^{2})
- Elevation: 804 ft (245 m)

Population (2010)
  - Total: 1,037
  - Density: 1,960/sq mi (757/km^{2})
- Time zone: UTC-6 (Central (CST))
  - Summer (DST): UTC-5 (CDT)
- Zip Code: 78660
- FIPS code: 48-79676
- GNIS feature ID: 2409609

Windermere was a census-designated place (CDP) in Travis County, Texas, United States. The population was 1,037 at the 2010 census. It has since largely been annexed by the city of Pflugerville.

== Geography ==
Windermere is located 14 miles (23 km) northeast of downtown Austin.

According to the United States Census Bureau in 2000, the CDP had a total area of 2.1 square miles (5.5 km^{2}), all land. Prior to the 2010 census, parts of the CDP were annexed to Pflugerville and Round Rock cities and additional area was lost, reducing the total area to 0.53 square miles (1.4 km^{2}), all land. Following further annexations by Pflugerville, the area was no longer recorded as a CDP at the time of the 2020 census.

== Demographics ==
Historical population
Census	Pop.	Note	%±
2000	6,868		—
2010	1,037		−84.9%
U.S. Decennial Census; 1850–1900 1910; 1920 1930 1940; 1950 1960 1970; 1980 1990 2000; 2010

At the 2000 census there were 6,868 people, 2,232 households, and 1,805 families living in the CDP. The population density was 3,216.8 inhabitants per square mile (1,242.0/km^{2}). There were 2,263 housing units at an average density of 1,059.9 per square mile (409.2/km^{2}). The racial makeup of the CDP was 63.66% White, 16.82% African American, 0.32% Native American, 5.98% Asian, 0.12% Pacific Islander, 9.93% from other races, and 3.17% from two or more races. Hispanic or Latino of any race were 23.08%.

Of the 2,232 households 53.5% had children under the age of 18 living with them, 64.4% were married couples living together, 13.2% had a female householder with no husband present, and 19.1% were non-families. 12.3% of households were one person and 1.0% were one person aged 65 or older. The average household size was 3.04 and the average family size was 3.34.

The age distribution was 33.1% under the age of 18, 6.8% from 18 to 24, 44.2% from 25 to 44, 13.9% from 45 to 64, and 2.0% 65 or older. The median age was 30 years. For every 100 females, there were 98.4 males. For every 100 females age 18 and over, there were 95.7 males.

The median household income was $64,438 and the median family income was $66,941. Males had a median income of $39,977 versus $31,649 for females. The per capita income for the CDP was $22,784. About 2.9% of families and 4.4% of the population were below the poverty line, including 3.6% of those under age 18 and none of those age 65 or over.

== Education ==
Public education in a portion of the former CDP is provided by the Pflugerville Independent School District, while the other portion of the former CDP is in the Round Rock Independent School District.
