= Shady Hollow, Texas =

- CDP
- Coordinates: 30°09′52″N 97°51′47″W
- Country: United States
- State: Texas
- County: Travis

Area
  - Total: 2.1 sq mi (5.4 km^{2})
  - Land: 2.1 sq mi (5.4 km^{2})
  - Water: 0 sq mi (0.0 km^{2})
- Elevation: 758 ft (231 m)

Population (2020)
  - Total: 4,822
  - Density: 2,300/sq mi (890/km^{2})
- Time zone: UTC-6 (Central (CST))
  - Summer (DST): UTC-5 (CDT)
- Zip Code: 78739, 78748
- FIPS code: 48-67082
- GNIS feature ID: 2408719

Shady Hollow is a census-designated place (CDP) in southwestern Travis County, Texas, United States, and is partially in the City of Austin. It is located ten miles (16 km) southwest of Downtown Austin, near the Travis/Hays county line. The population was 4,822 at the 2020 census.

== History ==
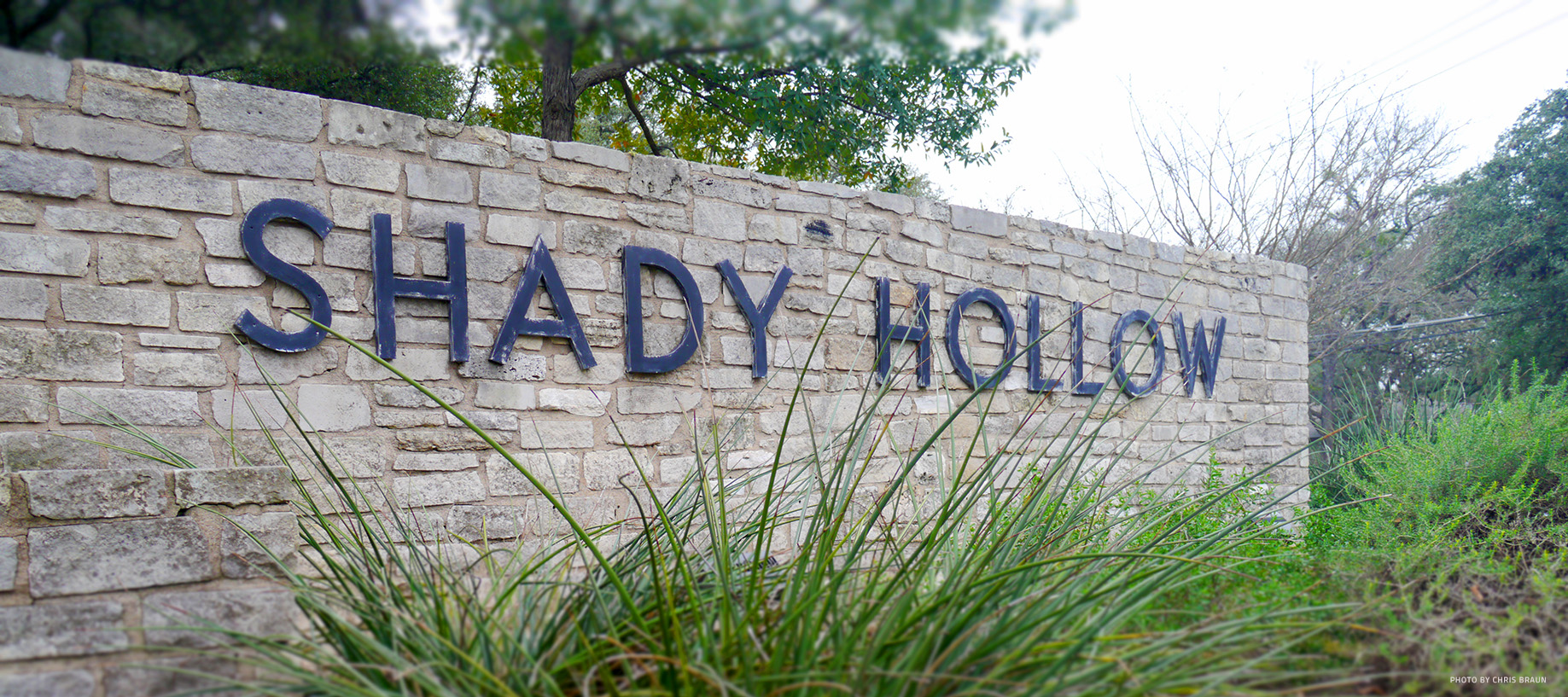

In 1972 Austin Savings and Loan Owners began development on 600 acres (2.4 km^{2}) of land. In 1978 the homeowners organized the Shady Hollow Homeowners Corporation to counter what they believed was misrepresentation from the developer. The homeowners accused Austin Savings and Loan Owners of installing development more dense than advertised. The two groups formed an agreement, resulting in the creation of parks and recreational facilities along Slaughter Creek; this included the Park on Doe Run. The CDP also received several amenities, including a community center, tennis courts, and a basketball court. In 1984, as per the agreement, Austin Savings and Loan Owners deeded the park and recreational facilities to the Shady Hollow Homeowners Corporation.

== Geography ==
Shady Hollow is located 10 miles (16 km) southwest of downtown Austin.

According to the United States Census Bureau in 2000, the CDP has a total area of 5.4 square miles (14 km^{2}), all land. Prior to the 2010 census, parts of the CDP were annexed to the city of Austin and additional area was lost, reducing the total area to 2.1 square miles (5.4 km^{2}), all land.

== Demographics ==
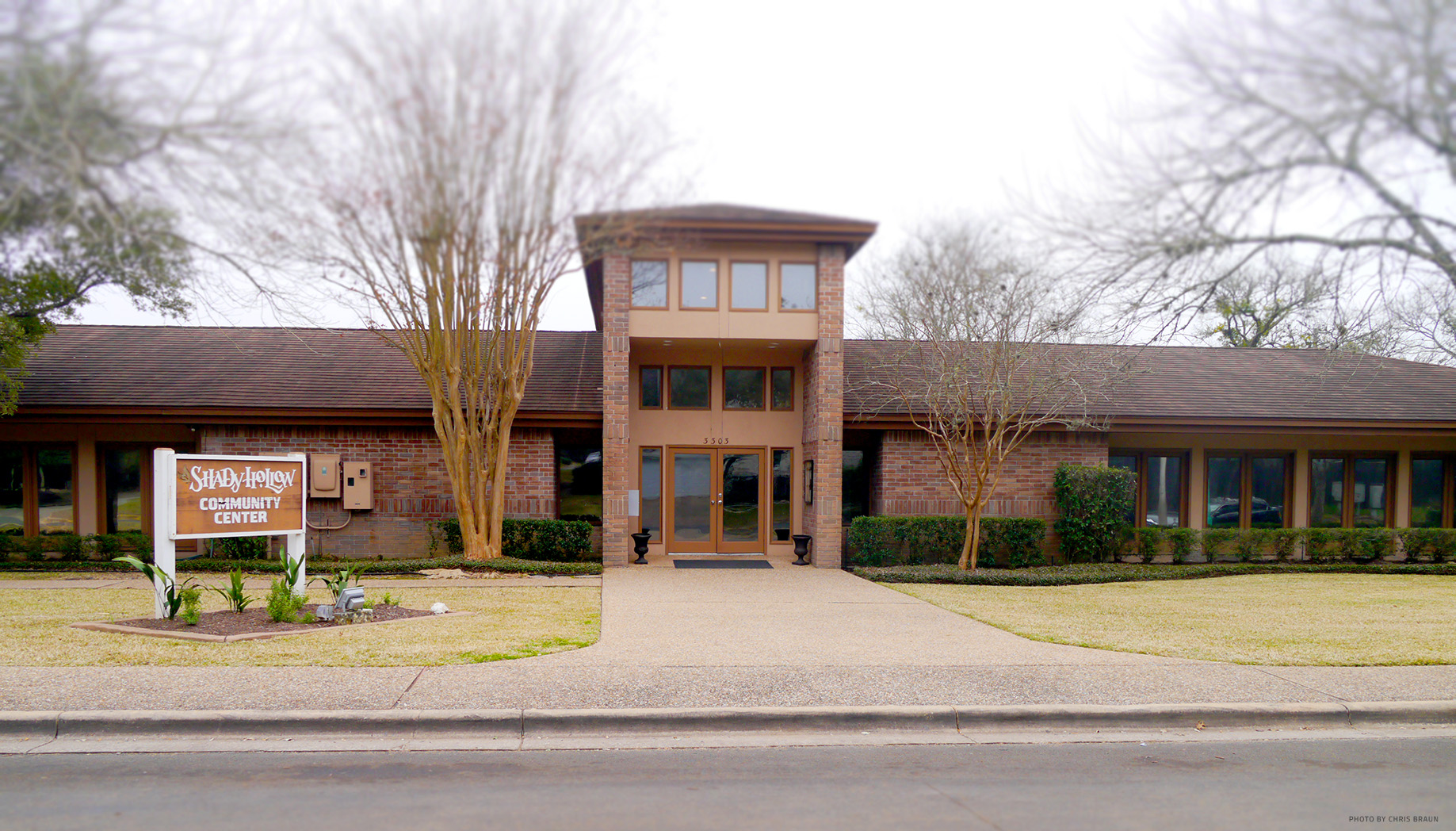
Community Center of Shady Hollow

Historical population
Census	Pop.	Note	%±
2000	5,140		—
2010	5,004		−2.6%
2020	4,822		−3.6%
U.S. Decennial Census; 1850–1900 1910; 1920 1930 1940; 1950 1960 1970; 1980 1990 2000; 2010

Shady Hollow first appeared as a census designated place in the 2000 U.S. census.

=== Racial and ethnic composition ===
Shady Hollow CDP, Texas – Racial and ethnic composition Note: the US Census treats Hispanic/Latino as an ethnic category. This table excludes Latinos from the racial categories and assigns them to a separate category. Hispanics/Latinos may be of any race.
Race / Ethnicity (NH = Non-Hispanic)	Pop 2000	Pop 2010	Pop 2020	% 2000	% 2010	% 2020
White alone (NH)	4,142	3,889	3,431	80.58%	77.72%	71.15%
Black or African American alone (NH)	130	116	90	2.53%	2.32%	1.87%
Native American or Alaska Native alone (NH)	14	17	8	0.27%	0.34%	0.17%
Asian alone (NH)	136	131	168	2.65%	2.62%	3.48%
Native Hawaiian or Pacific Islander alone (NH)	1	5	0	0.02%	0.10%	0.00%
Other race alone (NH)	11	3	24	0.21%	0.06%	0.50%
Mixed race or Multiracial (NH)	42	69	204	0.82%	1.38%	4.23%
Hispanic or Latino (any race)	664	774	897	12.92%	15.47%	18.60%
Total	5,140	5,004	4,822	100.00%	100.00%	100.00%

=== 2020 census ===
As of the 2020 census, Shady Hollow had a population of 4,822. The median age was 45.8 years. 23.3% of residents were under the age of 18 and 21.7% of residents were 65 years of age or older. For every 100 females there were 94.5 males, and for every 100 females age 18 and over there were 89.2 males age 18 and over.

100.0% of residents lived in urban areas, while 0.0% lived in rural areas.

There were 1,752 households in Shady Hollow, of which 33.6% had children under the age of 18 living in them. Of all households, 72.7% were married-couple households, 8.7% were households with a male householder and no spouse or partner present, and 15.5% were households with a female householder and no spouse or partner present. About 13.5% of all households were made up of individuals and 8.0% had someone living alone who was 65 years of age or older.

There were 1,792 housing units, of which 2.2% were vacant. The homeowner vacancy rate was 1.0% and the rental vacancy rate was 2.8%.

=== 2000 census ===
As of the census of 2000, there were 5,140 people, 1,658 households, and 1,483 families residing in the CDP. The population density was 957.3 inhabitants per square mile (369.6/km^{2}). There were 1,675 housing units at an average density of 311.9 per square mile (120.4/km^{2}). The racial makeup of the CDP was 89.67% White, 2.61% African American, 0.35% Native American, 2.67% Asian, 0.02% Pacific Islander, 3.19% from other races, and 1.50% from two or more races. Hispanic or Latino of any race were 12.92% of the population.

There were 1,658 households, out of which 49.7% had children under the age of 18 living with them, 81.2% were married couples living together, 5.9% had a female householder with no husband present, and 10.5% were non-families. 8.0% of all households were made up of individuals, and 1.7% had someone living alone who was 65 years of age or older. The average household size was 3.06 and the average family size was 3.23.

In the CDP, the population was spread out, with 30.8% under the age of 18, 5.6% from 18 to 24, 27.5% from 25 to 44, 30.5% from 45 to 64, and 5.6% who were 65 years of age or older. The median age was 39 years. For every 100 females, there were 102.8 males. For every 100 females age 18 and over, there were 99.8 males.

The median income for a household in the CDP was $94,470, and the median income for a family was $94,249. Males had a median income of $70,471 versus $37,868 for females. The per capita income for the CDP was $33,532. About 0.5% of families and 1.8% of the population were below the poverty line, including 0.9% of those under age 18 and none of those age 65 or over.

== Government and infrastructure ==
The Manchaca Volunteer Fire Department, headquartered in an unincorporated area of Travis County, provided Shady Hollow with fire protection for many years. As of July 1, 2016 there was an agreement that Austin Fire Dept. would take over the Shady Hollow fire station and provide protection. Travis County Sheriff's Office provides police protection.

== Education ==
Residents are in the Austin Independent School District. Residents are zoned to Baranoff Elementary School in Austin, Bailey Middle School in the Shady Hollow CDP, and Bowie High School in Austin.

Bowie was built in 1988. Bailey was built in 1993. Baranoff was built in 1998.
