= Steiner Ranch, Texas =

- Census-designated place
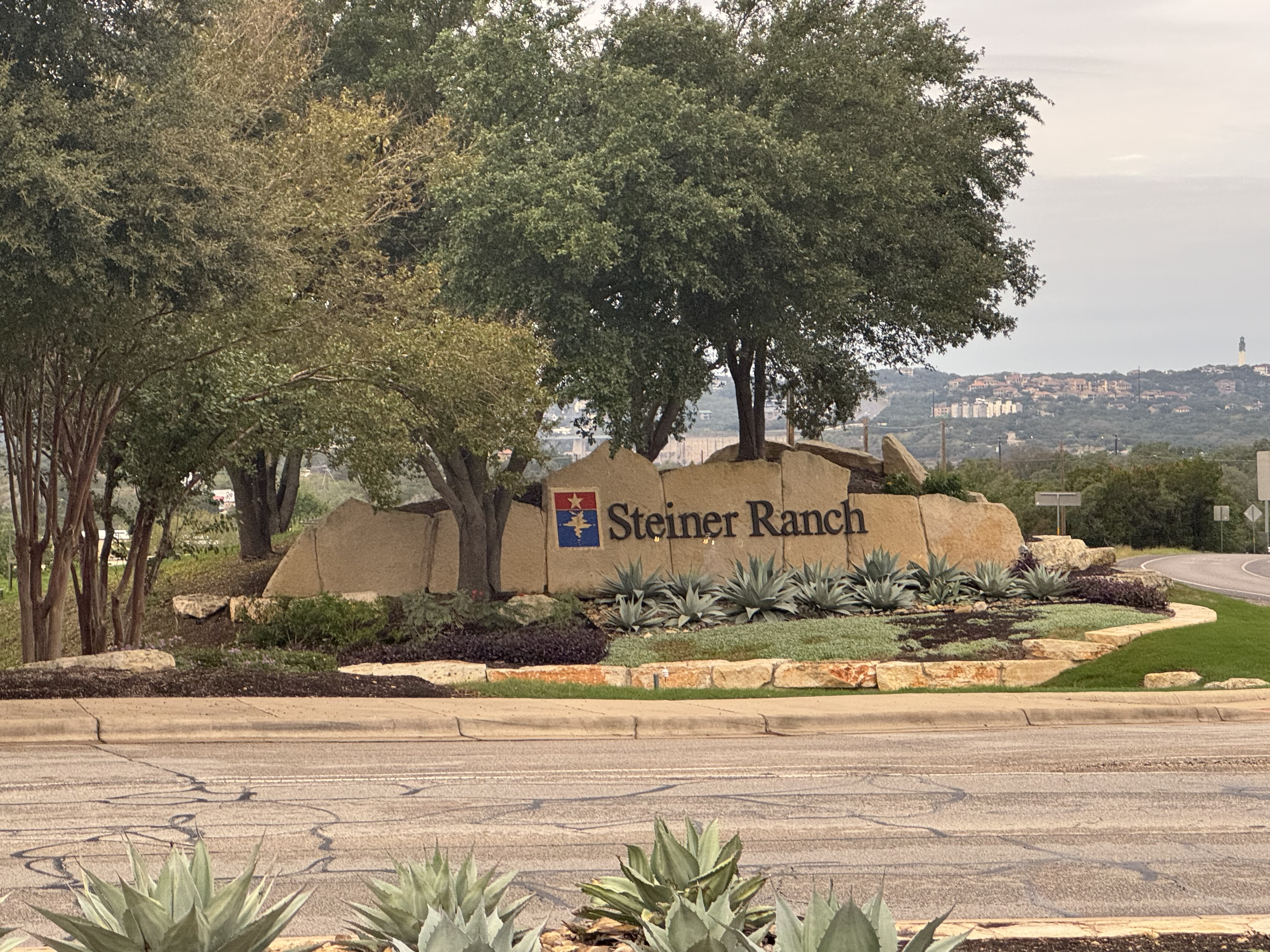
- A sign marking the entrance to Steiner Ranch

- Location within Texas Location within the United States
- Coordinates: 30°22′50″N 97°53′10″W
- Country: United States
- State: Texas
- County: Travis

Area
  - Total: 6.6 sq mi (17.2 km^{2})
  - Land: 6.6 sq mi (17.2 km^{2})
  - Water: 0 sq mi (0.0 km^{2})
- Elevation: 784 ft (239 m)

Population (2020)
  - Total: 16,713
- Time zone: UTC-6 (Central (CST))
  - Summer (DST): UTC-5 (CDT)
- ZIP Code: 78732 (Austin)
- Area codes: 512, 737
- FIPS code: 48-70154
- GNIS feature ID: 2805844

Steiner Ranch is a planned community and census-designated place (CDP) in Travis County, Texas, United States. It was first listed as a CDP in the 2020 census. As of the 2020 census, Steiner Ranch had a population of 16,713.

It is in the west-central part of the county, occupying 4,600 acres (1,900 ha) on a ridge running within a large bend on the north side of the Colorado River between Lake Travis and Lake Austin. The community is surrounded by the city limits of Austin, the state capital, and is 18 miles (29 km) by road northwest of downtown.

Real estate developer Al Hughes initially purchased the land for development in the late 1980s from the Steiner family. The neighborhood grew throughout the 1990s. It currently contains three elementary schools, one middle school and a variety of community parks, recreation centers and trails.

== Demographics ==
Historical population
Census	Pop.	Note	%±
2020	16,713		—
U.S. Decennial Census; 1850–1900 1910; 1920 1930 1940; 1950 1960 1970; 1980 1990 2000; 2010 2020

=== 2020 census ===
Steiner Ranch first appeared as a census-designated place in the 2020 census.

As of the 2020 census, Steiner Ranch had a population of 16,713. The median age was 38.4 years. 32.1% of residents were under the age of 18 and 9.4% of residents were 65 years of age or older. For every 100 females there were 98.0 males, and for every 100 females age 18 and over there were 93.2 males age 18 and over.

100.0% of residents lived in urban areas, while 0.0% lived in rural areas.

There were 5,502 households in Steiner Ranch, of which 51.5% had children under the age of 18 living in them. Of all households, 68.8% were married-couple households, 11.3% were households with a male householder and no spouse or partner present, and 16.6% were households with a female householder and no spouse or partner present. About 17.9% of all households were made up of individuals and 7.1% had someone living alone who was 65 years of age or older.

There were 5,719 housing units, of which 3.8% were vacant. The homeowner vacancy rate was 0.4% and the rental vacancy rate was 8.3%.

Steiner Ranch CDP, Texas – Racial and ethnic composition Note: the US Census treats Hispanic/Latino as an ethnic category. This table excludes Latinos from the racial categories and assigns them to a separate category. Hispanics/Latinos may be of any race.
Race / Ethnicity (NH = Non-Hispanic)	Pop 2020	% 2020
White alone (NH)	10,955	65.55%
Black or African American alone (NH)	385	2.30%
Native American or Alaska Native alone (NH)	40	0.24%
Asian alone (NH)	2,209	13.22%
Native Hawaiian or Pacific Islander alone (NH)	1	0.01%
Other race alone (NH)	99	0.59%
Mixed race or Multiracial (NH)	904	5.41%
Hispanic or Latino (any race)	2,120	12.68%
Total	16,713	100.00%

=== Demographic estimates ===
Steiner Ranch's total population, as of 2021, is 17,780, with 8,748 males and 9,032 females. The median age is 40.7. The total number of households is 5,867 with an average of 3 people per household. Families account for 4,334 of those households, and non-families, 1,533. Of those households, 3,148 have children. 1,626 Steiner residents are self-employed, while 5,650 work for private companies. Governmental workers number 877 and those working for non-profit companies, 432.

== Education ==
Steiner Ranch is located in Leander Independent School District. It contains three elementary schools:

- Steiner Ranch Elementary School
- Laura Welch Bush Elementary School
- River Ridge Elementary School

The community also contains one middle school: Canyon Ridge Middle School. High School students attend Vandegrift High School located at 9500 McNeil Drive, Austin, TX 78750.

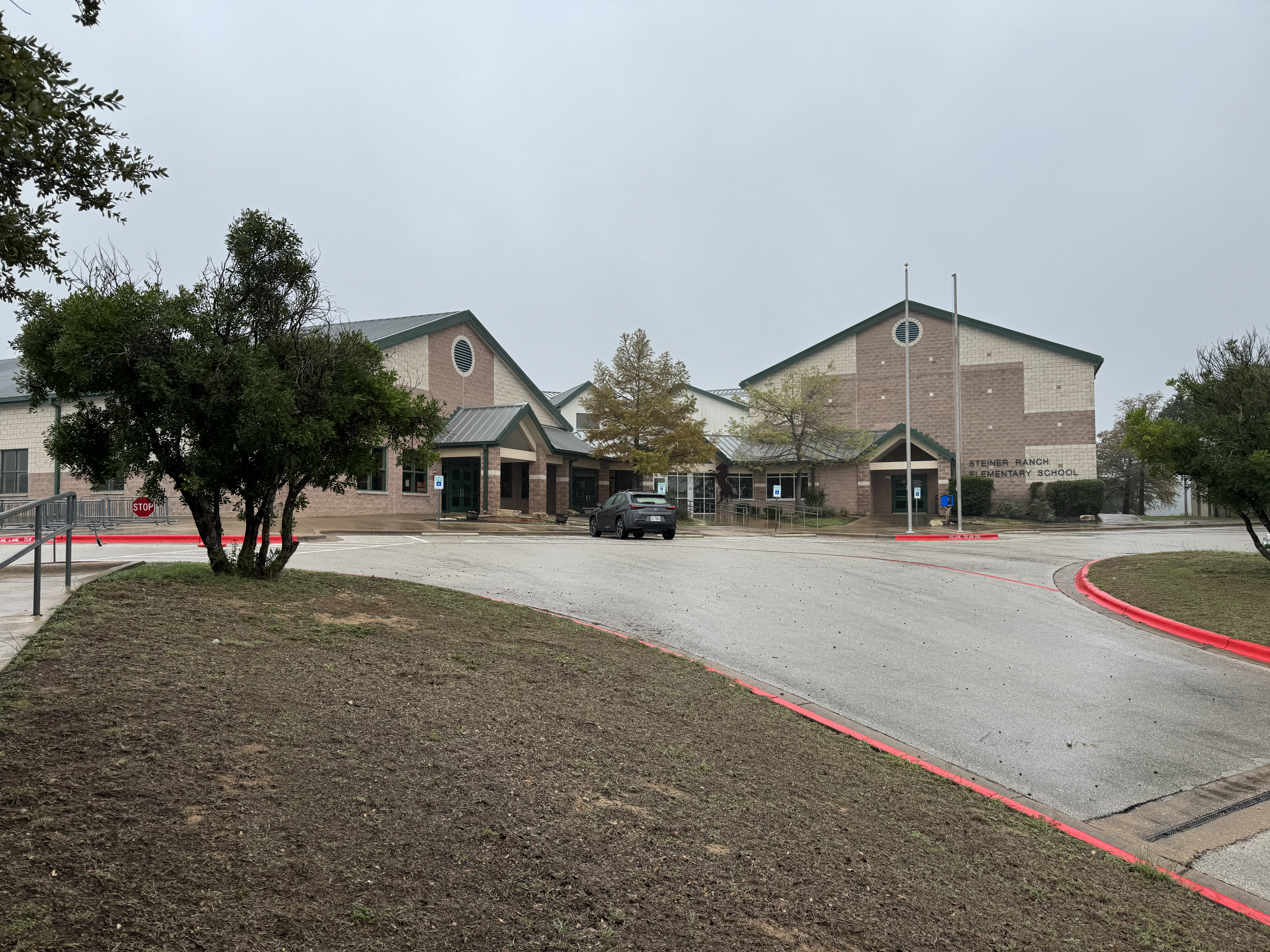
Steiner Ranch Elementary School

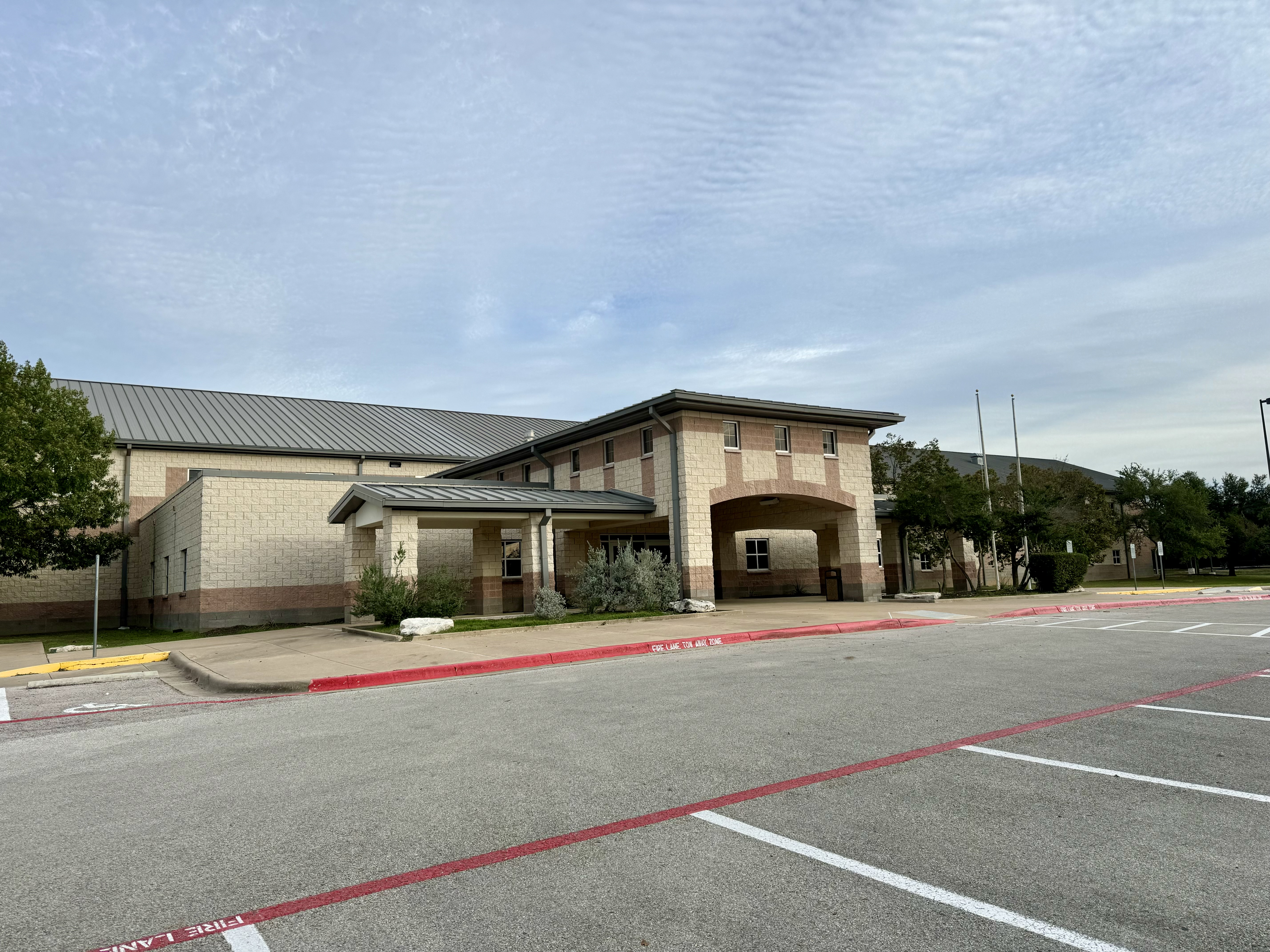
Laura Welch Bush Elementary School

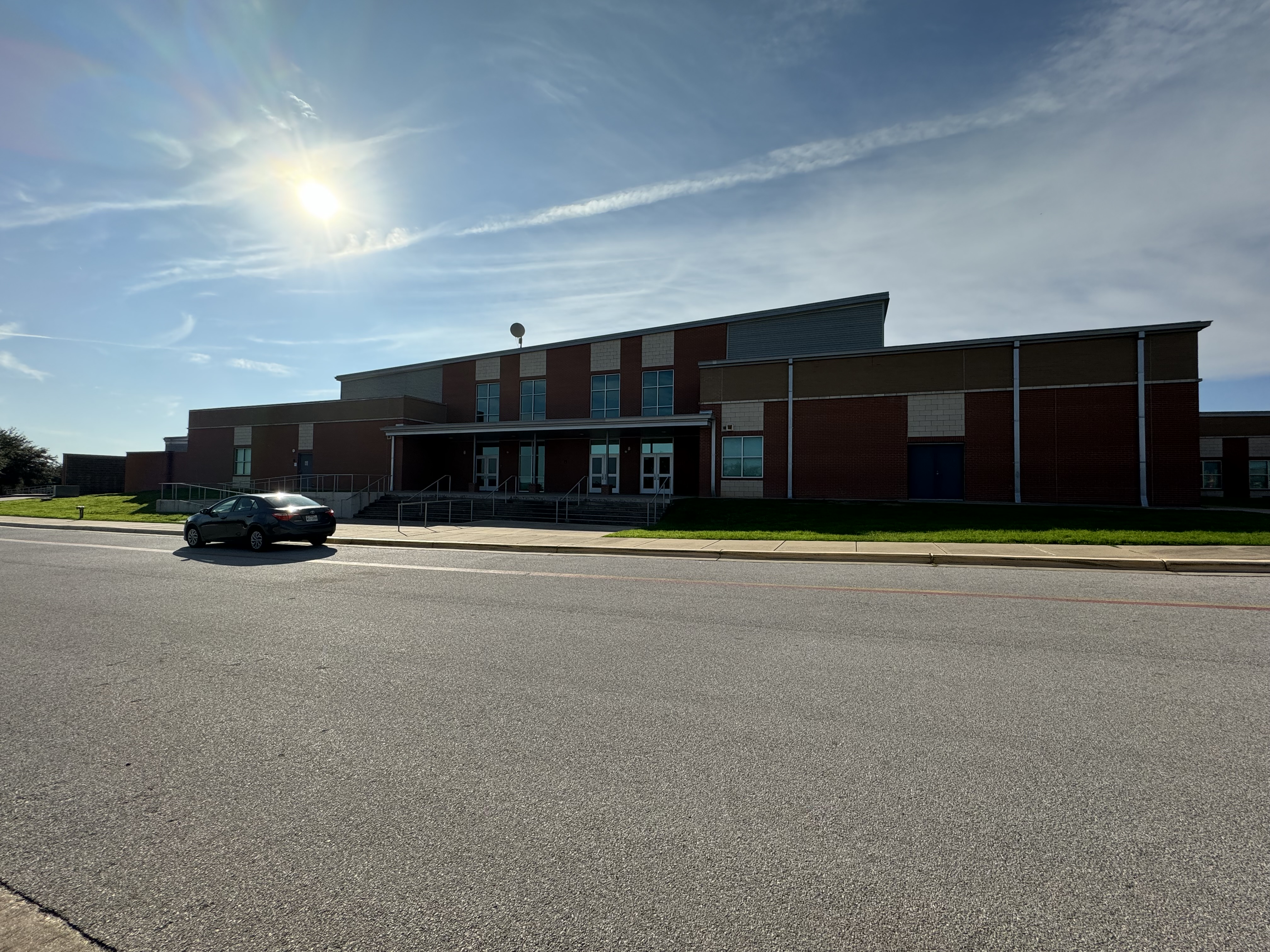
River Ridge Elementary School

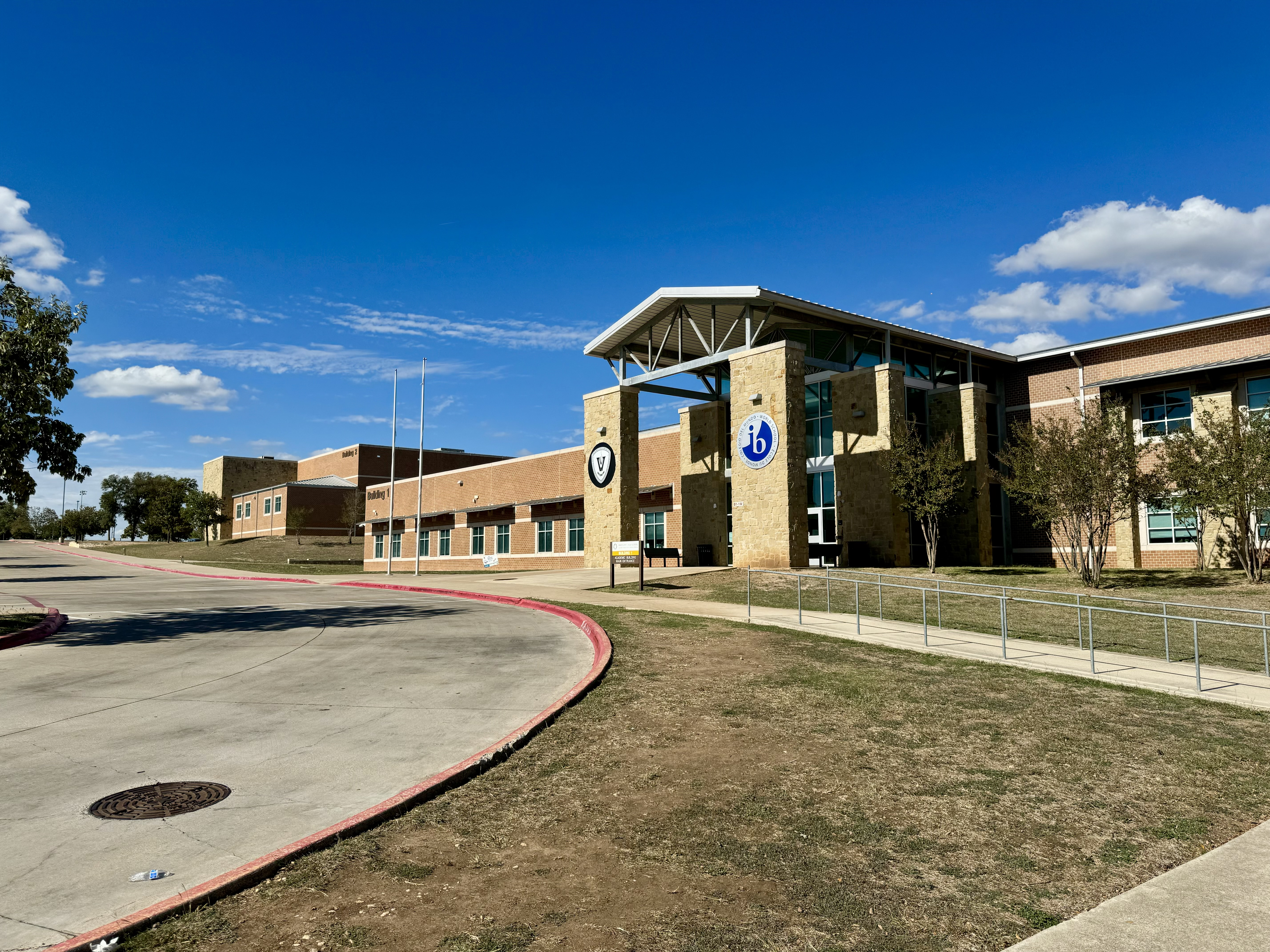
Vandegrift High School
