= Serenada, Texas =

- CDP
- Coordinates: 30°41′17″N 97°41′54″W
- Country: United States
- State: Texas
- County: Williamson

Area
  - Total: 2.6 sq mi (6.7 km^{2})
  - Land: 2.6 sq mi (6.7 km^{2})
  - Water: 0.0 sq mi (0 km^{2})
- Elevation: 820 ft (250 m)

Population (2020)
  - Total: 2,098
  - Density: 810/sq mi (310/km^{2})
- Time zone: UTC-6 (Central (CST))
  - Summer (DST): UTC-5 (CDT)
- Zip Code: 78633, 78628
- FIPS code: 48-66806
- GNIS feature ID: 1867565

Serenada is a census-designated place (CDP) in Williamson County, Texas, United States. The population was 2,098 at the 2020 census. Those living in Serenada have Georgetown addresses.

== Geography ==
Serenada is located at 30°41′17″N 97°41′54″W (30.687959, -97.698280).

According to the United States Census Bureau in 2000, the CDP has a total area of 3.5 square miles (9.2 km^{2}), all land. Prior to the 2010 census, part of the CDP was annexed to the city of Georgetown, decreasing the total area of 2.6 square miles (6.7 km^{2}), all land.

=== Climate ===
The climate in this area is characterized by hot, humid summers and generally mild to cool winters. According to the Köppen Climate Classification system, Serenada has a humid subtropical climate, abbreviated "Cfa" on climate maps.

== Demographics ==
Historical population
| Census | Pop. | Note | %± |
|---|---|---|---|
| 1990 | 3,242 | | — |
| 2000 | 1,847 | | −43.0% |
| 2010 | 1,641 | | −11.2% |
| 2020 | 2,098 | | 27.8% |
U.S. Decennial Census; 1850–1900 1910; 1920 1930 1940; 1950 1960 1970; 1980 1990 2000; 2010 2020

Serenada first appeared as a census designated place in the 2000 U.S. census.

=== 2020 census ===
Serenada CDP, Texas – Racial and ethnic composition Note: the US Census treats Hispanic/Latino as an ethnic category. This table excludes Latinos from the racial categories and assigns them to a separate category. Hispanics/Latinos may be of any race.
| Race / Ethnicity (NH = Non-Hispanic) | Pop 2000 | Pop 2010 | Pop 2020 | % 2000 | % 2010 | % 2020 |
|---|---|---|---|---|---|---|
| White alone (NH) | 1,733 | 1,489 | 1,680 | 93.83% | 90.74% | 80.08% |
| Black or African American alone (NH) | 12 | 10 | 37 | 0.65% | 0.61% | 1.76% |
| Native American or Alaska Native alone (NH) | 5 | 2 | 6 | 0.27% | 0.12% | 0.29% |
| Asian alone (NH) | 8 | 5 | 39 | 0.43% | 0.30% | 1.86% |
| Native Hawaiian or Pacific Islander alone (NH) | 0 | 1 | 0 | 0.00% | 0.06% | 0.00% |
| Other race alone (NH) | 0 | 9 | 10 | 0.00% | 0.55% | 0.48% |
| Mixed race or Multiracial (NH) | 9 | 17 | 70 | 0.49% | 1.04% | 3.34% |
| Hispanic or Latino (any race) | 80 | 108 | 256 | 4.33% | 6.58% | 12.20% |
| Total | 1,847 | 1,641 | 2,098 | 100.00% | 100.00% | 100.00% |

=== 2000 census ===
As of the census of 2000, there were 1,847 people, 641 households, and 580 families residing in the CDP. The population density was 520.8 inhabitants per square mile (201.1/km^{2}). There were 651 housing units at an average density of 183.6 per square mile (70.9/km^{2}). The racial makeup of the CDP was 96.97% White, 0.65% African American, 0.27% Native American, 0.43% Asian, 0.16% Pacific Islander, 0.87% from other races, and 0.65% from two or more races. Hispanic or Latino of any race were 4.33% of the population.

There were 641 households, out of which 37.6% had children under the age of 18 living with them, 84.7% were married couples living together, 4.1% had a female householder with no husband present, and 9.4% were non-families. 8.1% of all households were made up of individuals, and 3.4% had someone living alone who was 65 years of age or older. The average household size was 2.88 and the average family size was 3.04.

In the CDP, the population was spread out, with 26.2% under the age of 18, 4.7% from 18 to 24, 21.5% from 25 to 44, 35.5% from 45 to 64, and 12.1% who were 65 years of age or older. The median age was 44 years. For every 100 females, there were 97.8 males. For every 100 females age 18 and over, there were 99.1 males.

The median income for a household in the CDP was $78,957, and the median income for a family was $82,768. Males had a median income of $60,234 versus $35,938 for females. The per capita income for the CDP was $41,110. None of the families and 0.4% of the population were living below the poverty line, including no under eighteens and 3.1% of those over 64.

== Education ==
Serenada is served by the Georgetown Independent School District.
