= Santa Rita Ranch, Texas =

- Census-designated place
- Location within Texas Location within the United States
- Coordinates: 30°39′58″N 97°49′54″W
- Country: United States
- State: Texas
- County: Williamson

Area
  - Total: 3.96 sq mi (10.26 km^{2})
  - Land: 3.95 sq mi (10.24 km^{2})
  - Water: 0.0077 sq mi (0.02 km^{2}) 0.19%
- Elevation: 1,025 ft (312 m)

Population (2020)
  - Total: 3,152
- Time zone: UTC-6 (Central (CST))
  - Summer (DST): UTC-5 (CDT)
- ZIP Code: 78642 (Liberty Hill)
- Area codes: 512, 737
- FIPS code: 48-65762
- GNIS feature ID: 2805854
- Website: https://santaritaranchaustin.com/

Santa Rita is a planned community and census-designated place (CDP) in Williamson County, Texas, United States. It was first listed as a CDP during the 2020 census. As of the 2020 census, Santa Rita Ranch had a population of 3,152. It sits on 3,100-acres. It is in the western part of the county, 11 miles (18 km) west of Georgetown, the county seat, and 6 miles (10 km) northeast of Liberty Hill. Ronald Reagan Boulevard, a western bypass of the Georgetown area, is the main road through the CDP.

== Demographics ==
Historical population
Census	Pop.	Note	%±
2020	3,152		—
U.S. Decennial Census; 1850–1900 1910; 1920 1930 1940; 1950 1960 1970; 1980 1990 2000; 2010 2020

Santa Rita Ranch first appeared as a census designated place in the 2020 U.S. census.

=== 2020 census ===
As of the 2020 census, Santa Rita Ranch had a population of 3,152. The median age was 33.7 years. 32.6% of residents were under the age of 18 and 9.7% of residents were 65 years of age or older. For every 100 females there were 96.3 males, and for every 100 females of the age of 18, and over there were 91.6 males of the same age and over.

65.3% of residents lived in urban areas, while 34.7% lived in rural areas.

There were 986 households in Santa Rita Ranch, of which 53.5% had children under the age of 18 living in them. Of all households, 76.9% were married-couple households, 6.0% were households with a male householder and no spouse or partner present, and 12.0% were households with a female householder and no spouse or partner present. About 8.4% of all households were made up of individuals and 2.7% had someone living alone who was 65 years of age or older.

There were 1,041 housing units, of which 5.3% were vacant. The homeowner vacancy rate was 3.2% and the rental vacancy rate was 16.1%.

Santa Rita Ranch CDP, Texas – Racial and ethnic composition Note: the US Census treats Hispanic/Latino as an ethnic category. This table excludes Latinos from the racial categories and assigns them to a separate category. Hispanics/Latinos may be of any race.
Race / Ethnicity (NH = Non-Hispanic)	Pop 2020	% 2020
White alone (NH)	2,204	69.92%
Black or African American alone (NH)	141	4.47%
Native American or Alaska Native alone (NH)	12	0.38%
Asian alone (NH)	96	3.05%
Native Hawaiian or Pacific Islander alone (NH)	9	0.29%
Other race alone (NH)	21	0.67%
Mixed race or Multiracial (NH)	159	5.04%
Hispanic or Latino (any race)	510	16.18%
Total	3,152	100.00%

== Schools around Santa Rita ==
Santa Rita Ranch is surrounded by several schools as outlined below;

- Liberty Hill Independent School District
- Santa Rita Elementary School
- Santa Rita Middle School
- Liberty Hill High School
- Georgetown ISD Schools
- Wolf Ranch Elementary School
- Tippit Middle School
- East View High School
- Divine Savior Academy
- Kids R Kids Learning Academy
- Legacy Ranch High School

== Awards ==
- Best selling neighborhood 2023
- Top master planned community award by real estate consulting company RCLCO
- Top-Selling Master-Planned Community in the Austin Area by RCLCO
