= Sonterra, Texas =

- Census-designated place
- Location within Texas Location within the United States
- Coordinates: 30°48′31″N 97°35′52″W
- Country: United States
- State: Texas
- County: Williamson

Area
  - Total: 2.37 sq mi (6.14 km^{2})
  - Land: 2.37 sq mi (6.13 km^{2})
  - Water: 0.0077 sq mi (0.02 km^{2})
- Elevation: 866 ft (264 m)
- Time zone: UTC-6 (Central (CST))
  - Summer (DST): UTC-5 (CDT)
- ZIP Code: 76537 (Jarrell)
- Area codes: 512, 737
- FIPS code: 48-68762
- GNIS feature ID: 2785009

Sonterra is a planned community and census-designated place (CDP) in Williamson County, Texas, United States. The population was 7,679 at the 2020 census. It was first listed as a CDP before the 2020 census.

It is in the northern part of the county, bordered to the north by the city of Jarrell. Interstate 35 forms part of the western border of the community, with access from Exit 275 (Sonterra Boulevard). I-35 leads north 27 miles (43 km) to Temple and south 40 miles (64 km) to Austin, the state capital.

== Demographics ==
Historical population
Census	Pop.	Note	%±
2020	7,679		—
U.S. Decennial Census; 1850–1900 1910; 1920 1930 1940; 1950 1960 1970; 1980 1990 2000; 2010

Sonterra first appeared as a census designated place in the 2020 U.S. census.

=== 2020 census ===
Sonterra CDP, Texas – Racial and ethnic composition Note: the US Census treats Hispanic/Latino as an ethnic category. This table excludes Latinos from the racial categories and assigns them to a separate category. Hispanics/Latinos may be of any race.
Race / Ethnicity (NH = Non-Hispanic)	Pop 2020	% 2020
White alone (NH)	3,590	46.75%
Black or African American alone (NH)	592	7.71%
Native American or Alaska Native alone (NH)	23	0.30%
Asian alone (NH)	124	1.61%
Native Hawaiian or Pacific Islander alone (NH)	11	0.14%
Other race alone (NH)	41	0.53%
Mixed race or Multiracial (NH)	357	4.65%
Hispanic or Latino (any race)	2,941	38.30%
Total	7,679	100.00%
