= Brushy Creek, Williamson County, Texas =

Brushy Creek, Texas
- CDP
- Location of Brushy Creek, Texas
- Coordinates: 30°30′39″N 97°44′5″W
- Country: United States
- State: Texas
- County: Williamson

Area
  - Total: 7.0 sq mi (18 km^{2})
  - Land: 6.93 sq mi (17.9 km^{2})
  - Water: 0.07 sq mi (0.18 km^{2})
- Elevation: 827 ft (252 m)

Population (2020)
  - Total: 22,519
  - Density: 3,250/sq mi (1,250/km^{2})
- Time zone: UTC-6 (Central (CST))
  - Summer (DST): UTC-5 (CDT)
- ZIP code: 78717
- Area code: 512
- FIPS code: 48-10897
- GNIS feature ID: 1867542

Brushy Creek is a census-designated place (CDP) in Williamson County, Texas, United States. The population was 22,519 at the 2020 census.

== Geography ==
Brushy Creek is located at 30°30′39″N 97°44′05″W (30.510970, -97.734697), just west of Round Rock along the shore of Brushy Creek.

According to the United States Census Bureau in 2000, the CDP has a total area of 8.7 square miles (22.6 km^{2}), all land. Prior to the 2010 census, the CDP had parts annexed to the cities of Austin and Round Rock and lost additional area, reducing its total area of 7.0 square miles (18 km^{2}), of which 6.93 square miles (17.9 km^{2}) were then land and 0.07 square miles (0.18 km^{2}) was water.

== Demographics ==
Historical population
Census	Pop.	Note	%±
1990	5,833		—
2000	15,371		163.5%
2010	21,764		41.6%
2020	22,519		3.5%
U.S. Decennial Census; 1850–1900 1910; 1920 1930 1940; 1950 1960 1970; 1980 1990 2000; 2010

Brushy Creek first appeared as a census designated place in the 1990 U.S. census.

=== 2020 census ===
Brushy Creek CDP, Texas – Racial and ethnic composition Note: the US Census treats Hispanic/Latino as an ethnic category. This table excludes Latinos from the racial categories and assigns them to a separate category. Hispanics/Latinos may be of any race.
Race / Ethnicity (NH = Non-Hispanic)	Pop 2000	Pop 2010	Pop 2020	% 2000	% 2010	% 2020
White alone (NH)	11,847	14,831	13,312	77.07%	68.14%	59.11%
Black or African American alone (NH)	618	848	1,109	4.02%	3.90%	4.92%
Native American or Alaska Native alone (NH)	34	74	52	0.22%	0.34%	0.23%
Asian alone (NH)	1,040	2,604	3,032	6.77%	11.96%	13.46%
Native Hawaiian or Pacific Islander alone (NH)	13	26	17	0.08%	0.12%	0.08%
Other race alone (NH)	10	37	106	0.07%	0.17%	0.47%
Mixed race or Multiracial (NH)	237	488	1,230	1.54%	2.24%	5.46%
Hispanic or Latino (any race)	1,572	2,856	3,661	10.23%	13.12%	16.26%
Total	15,371	21,764	22,519	100.00%	100.00%	100.00%

As of the 2020 United States census, there were 22,519 people, 5,713 households, and 4,432 families residing in the CDP.

As of the census of 2000, there were 15,371 people, 4,805 households, and 4,252 families residing in the CDP. The population density was 1,764.8 inhabitants per square mile (681.4/km^{2}). There were 4,919 housing units at an average density of 564.8 per square mile (218.1/km^{2}). The racial makeup of the CDP was 82.95% White, 4.08% African American, 0.27% Native American, 6.81% Asian, 0.08% Pacific Islander, 3.71% from other races, and 2.09% from two or more races. Hispanic or Latino of any race were 10.23% of the population.

There were 4,805 households, out of which 57.9% had children under the age of 18 living with them, 80.2% were married couples living together, 6.8% had a female householder with no husband present, and 11.5% were non-families. 8.6% of all households were made up of individuals, and 1.4% had someone living alone who was 65 years of age or older. The average household size was 3.18 and the average family size was 3.39.

In the CDP, the population was spread out, with 35.0% under the age of 18, 4.7% from 18 to 24, 39.1% from 25 to 44, 17.2% from 45 to 64, and 4.0% who were 65 years of age or older. The median age was 32 years. For every 100 females, there were 96.3 males. For every 100 females age 18 and over, there were 93.7 males.

The median income for a household in the CDP was $84,472, and the median income for a family was $85,370 (these figures had risen to $107,465 and $113,523 respectively as of a 2007 estimate). Males had a median income of $60,409 versus $39,542 for females. The per capita income for the CDP was $28,129. About 1.2% of families and 1.7% of the population were below the poverty line, including 2.0% of those under age 18 and 1.3% of those age 65 or over.

== Education ==
Much of the CDP is in the Round Rock Independent School District while some portions are in the Leander Independent School District.

Elementary schools serving RRISD sections of Brushy Creek include Brushy Creek, Fern Bluff, Great Oaks, Old Town, and Sommer. Middle schools serving RRISD sections include Cedar Valley, Chisholm Trail, Pearson Ranch, and James Garland Walsh. Some RRISD portions are zoned to Round Rock High School and others are zoned to McNeil High School.

Leander ISD sections are zoned to Akin Elementary School, Stiles Middle School, and Vista Ridge High School.

== Nearby localities ==
The following diagram represents localities within a 12 kilometres (7.5 mi) radius of Brushy Creek.

Neighboring localities
