= Granger Lake =

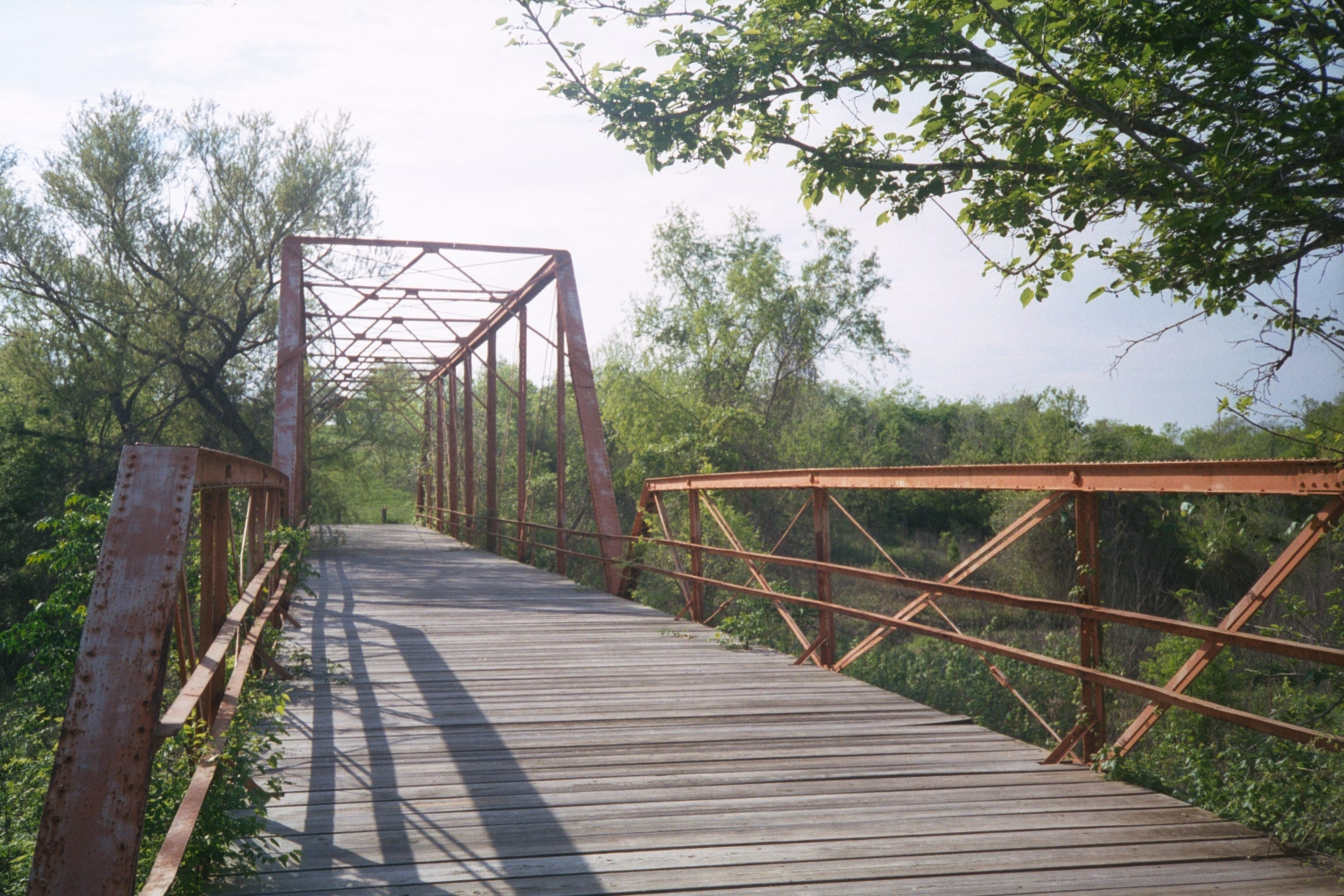
- One of several old iron truss bridges relocated to the hiking trails

- Location within Texas Location within the United States
- Location: Williamson County, Texas, United States
- Coordinates: 30°42′06″N 97°20′26″W
- Type: Flood control reservoir
- Primary inflows: San Gabriel River
- Primary outflows: San Gabriel River
- Basin countries: United States
- Surface area: 4,064 acres (16.45 km^{2})
- Max. depth: 50 ft (15 m)
- Surface elevation: 504.5 ft (153.8 m)

Granger Lake is a United States Army Corps of Engineers reservoir on the San Gabriel River in central Texas in the United States. It is one of the 11 reservoirs that make up the Brazos River basin. The lake is located near the towns of Granger, Texas and Taylor, Texas in Williamson County. The dam, lake, and all adjacent property are managed by the Fort Worth District of the U.S. Army Corps of Engineers. The reservoir was officially impounded in 1980 and serves to provide flood control for the communities downstream. Granger Lake is a popular recreational destination. The other reservoir on the San Gabriel River is Lake Georgetown, located upstream of Granger Lake, on the North Fork of the San Gabriel River, near Georgetown, Texas.

== History ==
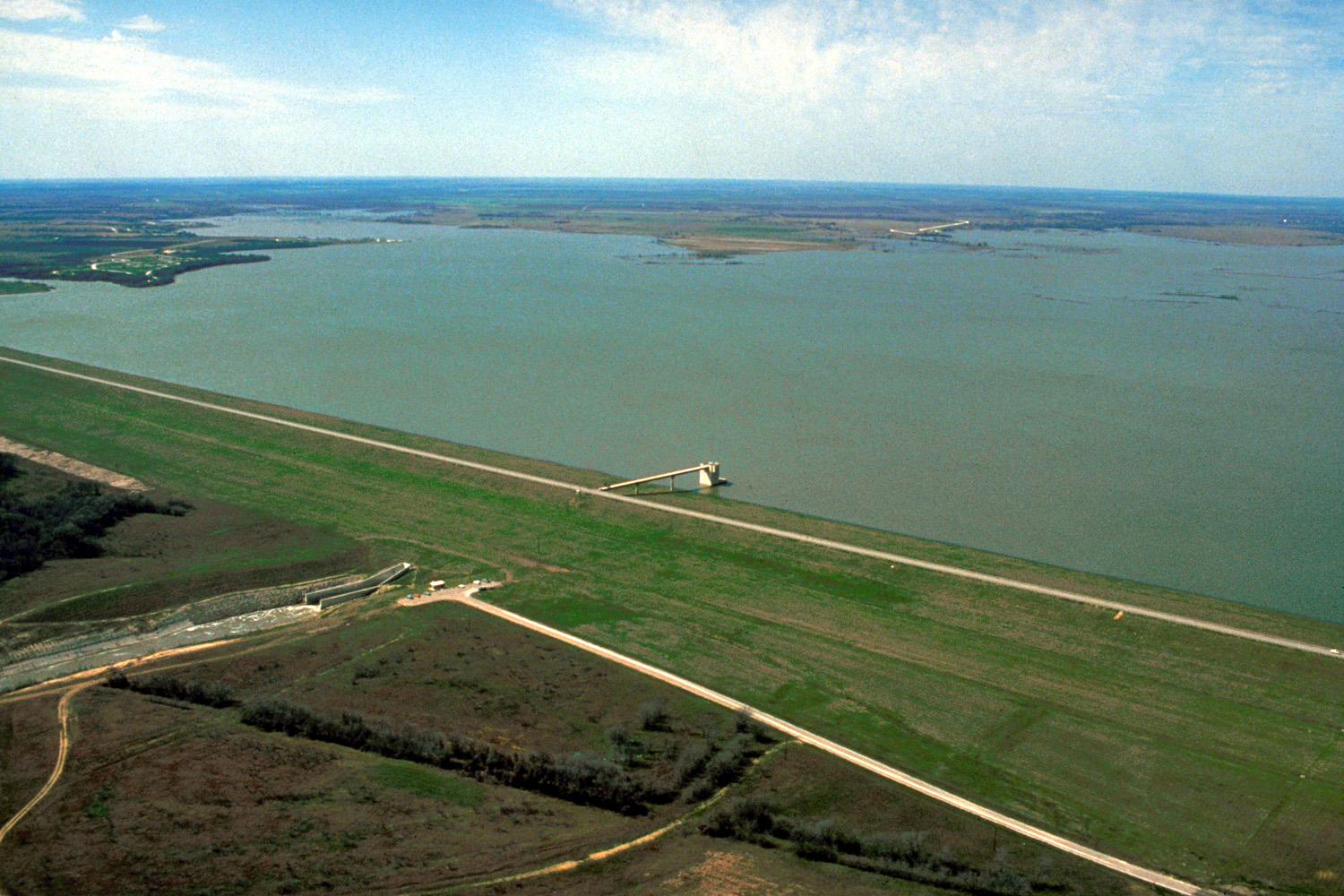
Aerial view of Granger Lake and Dam

Construction on the dam began in 1972 and finished in 1977. The dam is used for flood control, water conservation, recreational use, as well as fish and wildlife habitat. With surface area of 18,820 acres the storage capacity of Granger Dam is 561,100 acre-feet the dam is also a tourist site. There is approximately 10,800 acres of wildlife management areas that surround this lake as well.

== Fish population ==
Granger Lake has been stocked with species of fish intended to improve the utility of the reservoir for recreational fishing. Fish present in Granger Lake include catfish, white bass, and crappie.

Zebra, Quagga, and mussels are an invasive species that are able to attach themselves to boats and can be spread through anthropogenic sources. Granger Lake is one of two lakes in the San Gabriel River Basin that is found to have this infestation.

== Recreational uses ==
In addition to maintaining the dam that creates the reservoir, the U.S. Army Corps of Engineers maintains recreational facilities at the lake. Taylor Park, Willis Creek Park, and Wilson H. Fox Park include day use areas for picnics and boat ramps for lake access. Overnight camping at both improved and primitive sites is permitted. Several designated wildlife areas border the lake, including Pecan Grove Wildlife Area, San Gabriel Wildlife Area, Sore Finger Wildlife Area, and Willis Creek Wildlife Area. Boating and fishing are popular for this area.
