= Georgetown, Texas =

- City
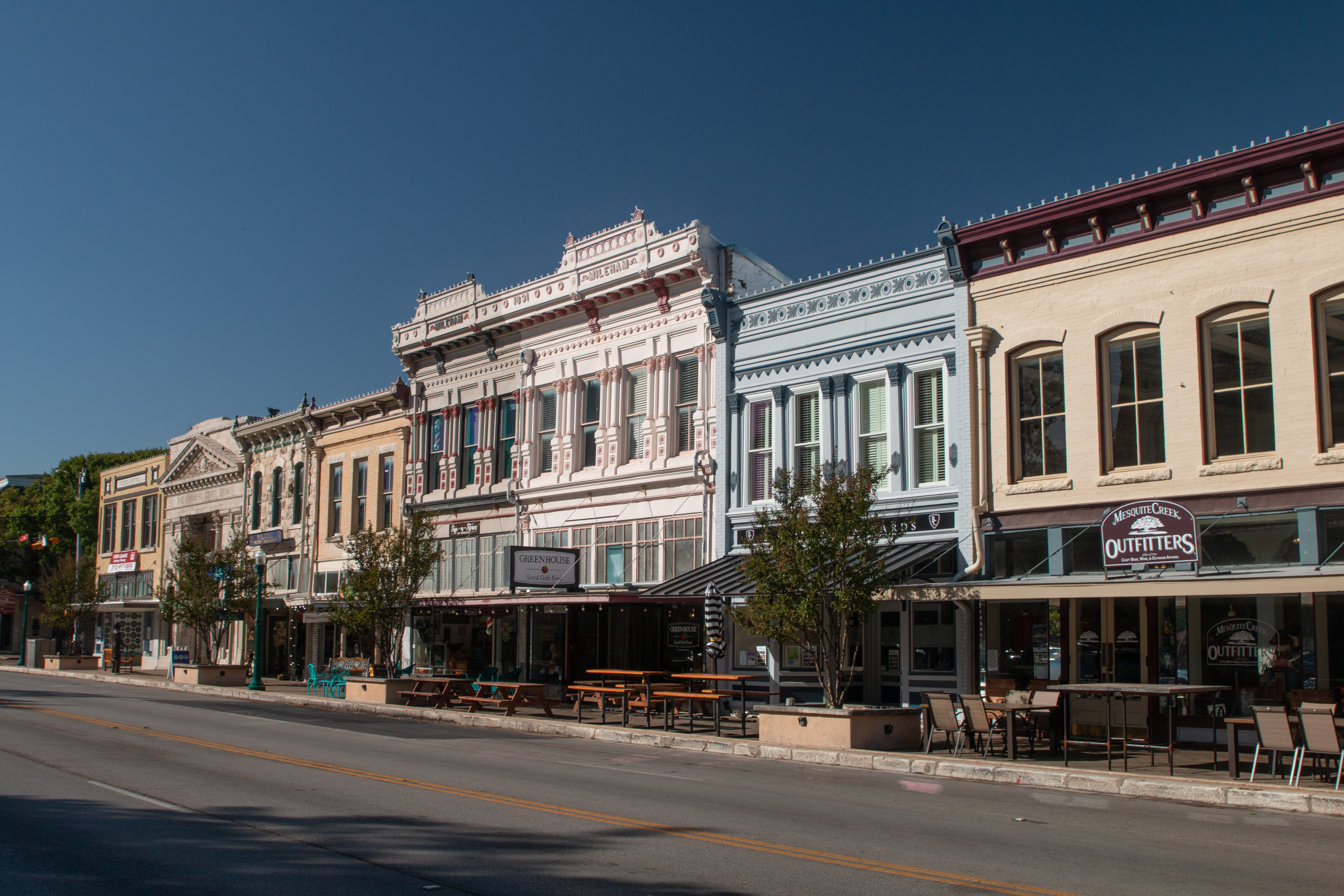
- Downtown Georgetown
- Nicknames: Red Poppy Capital of Texas, G-Town, GTX, Takachue Pouetsu (Land of Good Water)
- Motto: "Sincerely Yours"
- Location of Georgetown, Texas
- Coordinates: 30°37′58″N 97°40′38″W
- Country: United States
- State: Texas
- County: Williamson
- Founded: 1848
- Incorporated: 1866
- Named for: George Washington Glasscock

Government
  - Type: Council-Manager
  - Mayor: Josh Schroeder
  - City Manager: David Morgan

Area
  - Total: 60.451 sq mi (156.567 km^{2})
  - Land: 58.147 sq mi (150.600 km^{2})
  - Water: 2.304 sq mi (5.967 km^{2}) 3.81%
- Elevation: 750 ft (230 m)

Population (2020)
  - Total: 67,176
  - Estimate (2025): 106,907
  - Rank: US: 337th TX: 43rd
  - Density: 1,743/sq mi (672.9/km^{2})
- Demonym: Townie
- Time zone: UTC–6 (Central (CST))
  - Summer (DST): UTC–5 (CDT)
- ZIP Codes: 78626, 78627, 78628, 78633
- Area codes: 512 and 737
- FIPS code: 48-29336
- GNIS feature ID: 1357960
- Sales tax: 8.25%
- Website: georgetowntexas.gov

Georgetown is a city in Texas and the county seat of Williamson County, Texas, United States. The population was 67,176 at the 2020 census, and according to 2025 census estimates, the city is estimated to have a population of 106,907. It is 30 miles (48 km) north of Austin and is part of the Austin–Round Rock–San Marcos metropolitan statistical area.

Georgetown has a notable range of Victorian commercial and residential architecture. In 1976, a local historic ordinance was passed to recognize and protect the significance of the historic central business district. In 1977, the Williamson County Courthouse Historical District, containing some 46 contributing structures, was listed on the National Register of Historic Places.

Southwestern University is the oldest university in Texas, founded in 1840. Georgetown is known as the "Red Poppy" Capital of Texas for the red poppy wildflowers planted throughout the city. Georgetown's Red Poppy Festival, which attracts tens of thousands of visitors annually, is held in April each year on the historic square. Georgetown is the fastest-growing city in the United States, with an estimated population increase of nearly 60% since the 2020 census.

== History ==
=== Modern history ===
Georgetown was named for George Washington Glasscock, who donated the land for the new town. Early American and Swedish pioneers were attracted to the area's abundance of timber and good, clear water. In addition, the land was inexpensive and fertile. Georgetown is the county seat of Williamson County, which was formed on March 13, 1848, after the early settlers petitioned the state legislature to create it from a portion of Milam County. The county was originally to have been named San Gabriel County, but was instead named after Robert McAlpin Williamson (known as "Three-legged Willie"), a Texas statesman and judge at the time.

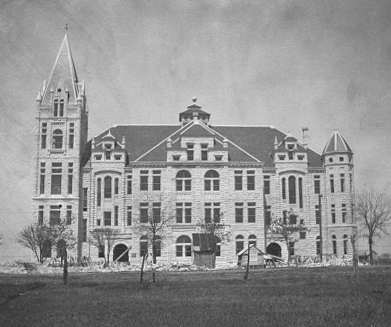
The Cullen Building on the campus of Southwestern University shortly after completion (c. 1900)

Georgetown was an agrarian community for most of the 19th and early 20th centuries. The Shawnee Trail, a cattle trail that led from Texas to the rail centers in Kansas and Missouri, crossed through Georgetown. The establishment of Southwestern University in 1873 and construction of a railroad in 1878 contributed to the town's growth and importance. A stable economy developed, based largely on agricultural activity. Cotton was the dominant crop in the area between the 1880s and the 1920s. In this period, Williamson County was once the top producer of cotton in Texas.

At one time, Georgetown was served by two national railroads, the International-Great Northern Railroad (I-GN), which eventually was merged into the Missouri Pacific, and the Missouri–Kansas–Texas Railroad (M-K-T). Both supported the transport of commodities to market: beef cattle and cotton. The regional Georgetown and Granger Railroad (GGR) was completed to Austin in 1904. Georgetown is served today by the Georgetown Railroad, a 'short line' railroad that uses portions of the former M-K-T and the I-GN to connect with the Union Pacific Railroad at Round Rock and at Granger.

Georgetown has also been home to minor league baseball: the 1914 Georgetown Collegians began play as charter members of the Class D level Middle Texas League.

In 1921 a low-pressure system from a hurricane settled in over Williamson County and brought more than 23 inches of rain in Taylor and more than 18 inches of rain in Georgetown. The flooding resulted in the death of 156 persons, many of them farm laborers. There was also extensive property damage, and Georgetown residents sought to begin flood control.

The U.S. Army Corps of Engineers completed construction of a dam more than 50 years later, on the north fork of the San Gabriel River, to create and impound Lake Georgetown, which opened officially on October 5, 1979. Both Georgetown and Round Rock own water rights to Lake Georgetown for municipal water use.

Population growth and industrial expansion continued modestly in the 20th century until about 1960, when residential, commercial, and industrial development, due to major growth and urban expansion of nearby Austin, greatly accelerated.

In March 2015, Georgetown announced that their municipal-owned utility, Georgetown Utility Systems, would begin buying 100% of power for its customers from wind and solar farms by 2017, effectively making the city 100% green-powered.

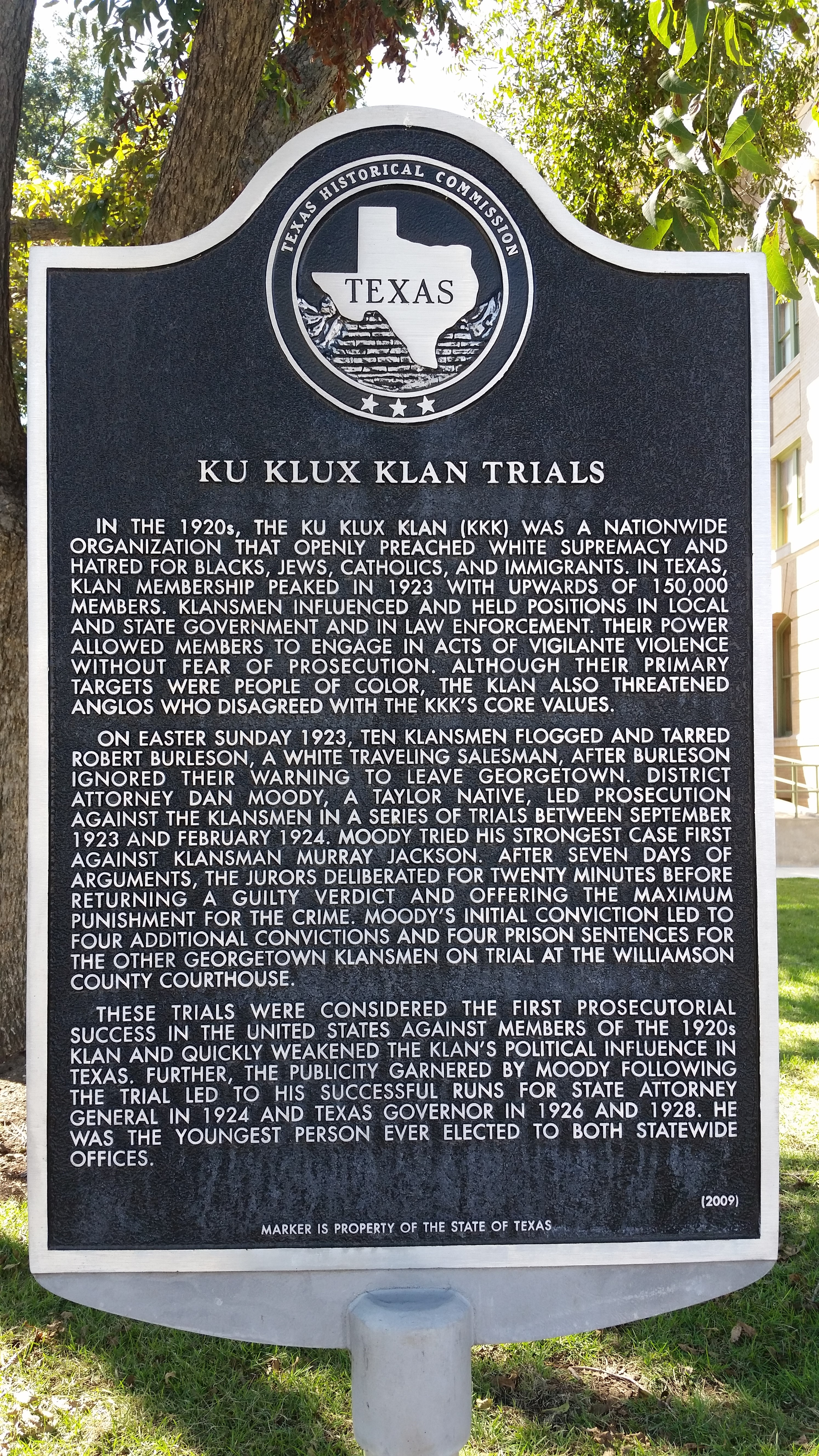
Texas historical marker for the Ku Klux Klan trials. The marker is on the Williamson County Courthouse grounds.

=== Klan Trials ===
Between September 1923 and February 1924, District Attorney Dan Moody led a series of trials against the Ku Klux Klan at the Williamson Country Courthouse. The trials resulted in five assault convictions against members of the Ku Klux Klan for beating and tarring a white traveling salesman. The Texas Historical Commission wrote, "These trials were considered the first prosecutorial success in the United States against the 1920s Klan and quickly weakened the Klan's political influence in Texas."

=== Burkland-Frisk House ===
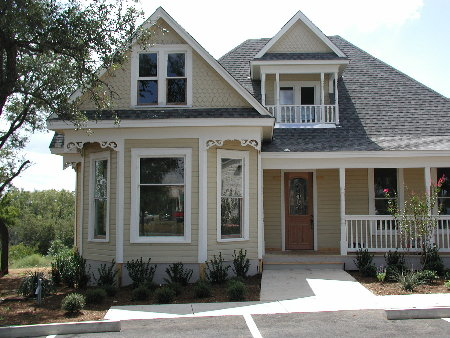
This 1900–1910 "pattern book" house was moved to Georgetown from Round Rock, Texas, in 2006. It overlooks the South San Gabriel River.

A densely overgrown, 1908–1910 Victorian house was found in Round Rock, Texas. (The site was later redeveloped for the La Frontera project.) The historic house was cut into pieces, and moved to Georgetown in 2006. There it was restored by Don Martin and Bill Smalling (1953–2008). It is located on San Gabriel Village Blvd, prominently overlooking the South San Gabriel River, and is now used as an office. It is known locally as the Burkland-Frisk House, as it was built by Leonard Frisk, an early settler in Williamson County, and was later owned by Tony Burkland, a relative.

=== Historic neighborhoods ===
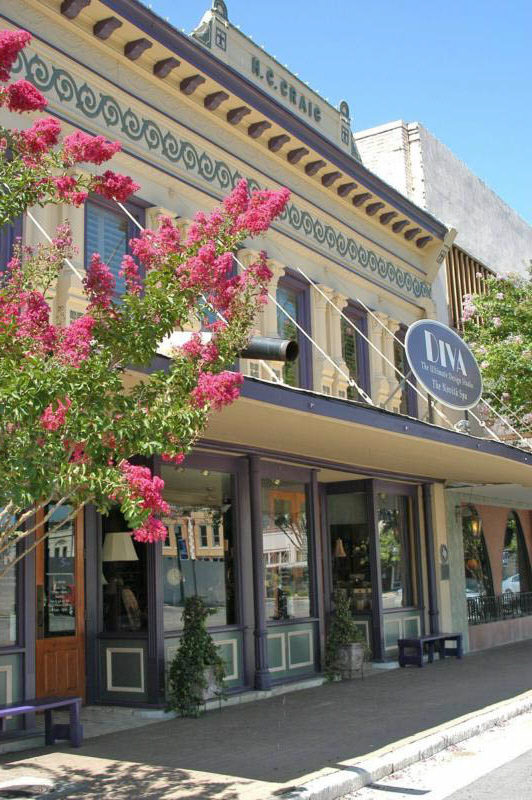
Typical downtown Georgetown buildings on "The Square"

In the 1970s, Georgetown's downtown was bleak and featureless. In an effort to modernize and compete with suburban retail development, building owners in the 1950s and 1960s had obscured some of their historical retail buildings. The Texas-Victorian streetscape was plastered with stucco, aluminum covers, brick, and multiple layers of white paint. Community leaders began to reassess this retail stock, and work with the Main Street program of the National Trust for Historic Preservation to enhance the architectural heritage of the city.

In this period, economics also began to favor the reuse of historic buildings, as the cost of borrowing money was soaring. In Georgetown, every bank offered significantly lower interest loans for the renewal of the town's grand Victorian buildings and facades. Rehabilitation tax credit programs in the 1980s made investing in historic property more profitable. By 1984, 40 rehabilitations were complete. Two years after Georgetown initiated its Main Street program, more than half the Main Street district had undergone some kind of positive transition.

Today, Georgetown is home to one of the best-preserved Victorian and pre-WW1 downtown historic districts, with the Beaux-Arts Williamson County Courthouse (1911) as its centerpiece. Due to its successful preservation efforts, Georgetown was named a national Main Street City in 1997, the first Texas city so designated. Georgetown has three National Register Historic Districts:

- Williamson County Courthouse Historic District
- Belford National District
- The University Avenue/Elm Street District

== Geography ==
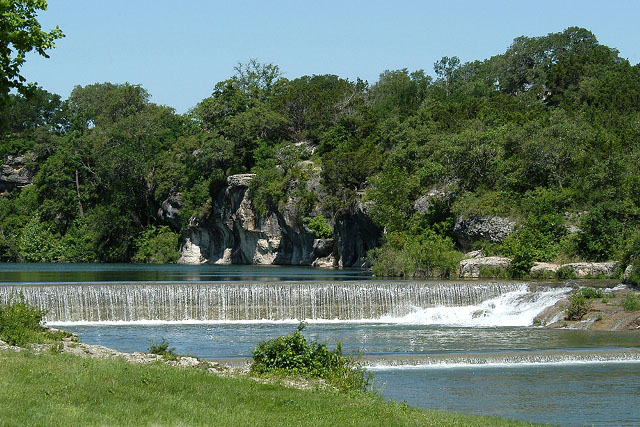
Blue Hole Park is a popular swimming area in Georgetown, located on the South Fork of the San Gabriel River.

Georgetown is located at 26 miles (42 km) north of Austin's central business district. According to the United States Census Bureau, the city has a total area of 60.451 square miles (156.57 km^{2}), of which 58.147 square miles (150.60 km^{2}) is land and 2.304 square miles (5.97 km^{2}) (3.81%) are covered by water.

Prior to the 2010 census, the city annexed part of the Serenada CDP, increasing its total area to 54.3 square miles (141 km^{2}), of which 52.1 square miles (135 km^{2}) was land and 2.3 square miles (6.0 km^{2}) was water-covered.

The city is located on the northeastern edge of Texas Hill Country. Portions of Georgetown are located on either side of the Balcones Escarpment, a fault line in which the areas roughly east of IH-35 are flat and characterized by having black, fertile soils of the Blackland Prairie, and the west side of the escarpment which consists mostly of hilly, karst-like terrain with little topsoil and higher elevations and which is part of the Texas Hill Country. Inner Space Cavern, a large cave, is a major tourist attraction found on the south side of the city, just west of Interstate 35, and is a large-scale example of limestone karst formations.

The North and Middle Forks of the San Gabriel River both run through the city. More than 30 miles of hike and bike trails, several parks, and recreation for both residents and visitors are provided along their banks.

Major highways

- Interstate 35
- State Highway 29
- State Highway 195
- State Highway 130 (Toll Road)

=== Endangered species ===
Georgetown is home to five endangered species. Two are songbirds protected by the Balcones Canyonlands Preserve in Travis and Williamson Counties. Invertebrate species found only in Williamson County live in the cave-like fissures on the west side of Georgetown. Karst topography is the name for the honeycomb-type limestone formations (including caves, sinkholes, and fissures) that are typical in the county's limestone geology west of I-35.

In the 1990s, a small group of concerned landowners and developers formed the Northern Edwards Aquifer Resource Council. Their goal was to identify and preserve a sufficient number of caves with endangered species to ensure survival of the species. Ultimately they wanted to obtain a United States Fish and Wildlife Service 10-A permit (known as an Incidental Take Permit) for the entire county by such actions. By gaining the permit, these species would be preserved through voluntary donations of land rather than by the county or state requiring setbacks and other involuntary means. The group documented their successful work in an environmental impact statement to the county in 2002, and a county-wide 10-A permit was obtained in October 2008.

=== Climate ===
According to the Köppen climate classification system, Georgetown has a humid subtropical climate, Cfa on climate maps.

Georgetown, like much of Central Texas, is characterized by its long, hot summers and cooler, mild winters. The average summer temperature typically reaches 100 °F for several days during July and August. It is common for highs to be near 90 °F well into October, but by this time, the nights are noticeably cooler.

Winters in Georgetown have highs in the 50s and 60s °F (10 to 21 °C), with a few days dropping near freezing, causing one or two ice storms per season. A few days reach well above the average. The region may have temperatures in the 80s °F (26 to 32 °C) well into December and 70s °F (21 to 26 °C) in January.

Fall, winter, and spring all average about two to three inches of rain per month, while July and August are the driest, averaging only one to two inches and sometimes no precipitation at all. Most of what rain does fall during the long summer comes from the outflow of Gulf storms that are often pushed away from the region by a large summer high-pressure system.

Georgetown has more than 225 days classified as mostly sunny to sunny, among a total of more than 300 days of at least partly cloudy skies per year.

Climate data for Georgetown Lake, Texas (1991–2020 normals, extremes 1896–present)
| Month | Jan | Feb | Mar | Apr | May | Jun | Jul | Aug | Sep | Oct | Nov | Dec | Year |
|---|---|---|---|---|---|---|---|---|---|---|---|---|---|
| Record high °F (°C) | 89 (32) | 98 (37) | 97 (36) | 102 (39) | 104 (40) | 108 (42) | 113 (45) | 112 (44) | 111 (44) | 102 (39) | 97 (36) | 88 (31) | 113 (45) |
| Mean maximum °F (°C) | 77.9 (25.5) | 82.1 (27.8) | 86.6 (30.3) | 90.8 (32.7) | 94.0 (34.4) | 98.6 (37.0) | 101.6 (38.7) | 102.7 (39.3) | 99.0 (37.2) | 92.6 (33.7) | 83.9 (28.8) | 78.2 (25.7) | 104.2 (40.1) |
| Mean daily maximum °F (°C) | 60.3 (15.7) | 64.6 (18.1) | 71.5 (21.9) | 78.6 (25.9) | 85.4 (29.7) | 92.0 (33.3) | 95.9 (35.5) | 96.8 (36.0) | 90.1 (32.3) | 81.3 (27.4) | 69.8 (21.0) | 61.7 (16.5) | 79.0 (26.1) |
| Daily mean °F (°C) | 48.3 (9.1) | 52.3 (11.3) | 59.4 (15.2) | 66.4 (19.1) | 74.4 (23.6) | 80.7 (27.1) | 84.1 (28.9) | 84.4 (29.1) | 78.3 (25.7) | 69.0 (20.6) | 58.1 (14.5) | 49.9 (9.9) | 67.1 (19.5) |
| Mean daily minimum °F (°C) | 36.2 (2.3) | 40.1 (4.5) | 47.2 (8.4) | 54.2 (12.3) | 63.4 (17.4) | 69.5 (20.8) | 72.2 (22.3) | 72.0 (22.2) | 66.5 (19.2) | 56.8 (13.8) | 46.3 (7.9) | 38.2 (3.4) | 55.2 (12.9) |
| Mean minimum °F (°C) | 22.6 (−5.2) | 26.2 (−3.2) | 31.1 (−0.5) | 39.6 (4.2) | 50.0 (10.0) | 62.1 (16.7) | 67.0 (19.4) | 66.0 (18.9) | 55.0 (12.8) | 41.5 (5.3) | 30.4 (−0.9) | 24.6 (−4.1) | 18.9 (−7.3) |
| Record low °F (°C) | 0 (−18) | −1 (−18) | 15 (−9) | 25 (−4) | 37 (3) | 46 (8) | 56 (13) | 54 (12) | 34 (1) | 23 (−5) | 13 (−11) | −2 (−19) | −2 (−19) |
| Average precipitation inches (mm) | 2.50 (64) | 2.24 (57) | 3.09 (78) | 3.02 (77) | 4.25 (108) | 3.97 (101) | 2.19 (56) | 2.64 (67) | 3.96 (101) | 3.92 (100) | 2.71 (69) | 2.59 (66) | 37.08 (942) |
| Average precipitation days (≥ 0.01 in) | 7.4 | 7.4 | 8.8 | 6.8 | 7.9 | 7.1 | 5.2 | 4.6 | 6.3 | 6.7 | 7.5 | 7.8 | 83.5 |
Source: NOAA

== Demographics ==
Historical population
| Census | Pop. | Note | %± |
|---|---|---|---|
| 1870 | 479 | | — |
| 1880 | 1,354 | | 182.7% |
| 1890 | 2,447 | | 80.7% |
| 1900 | 2,790 | | 14.0% |
| 1910 | 2,096 | | −24.9% |
| 1920 | 2,871 | | 37.0% |
| 1930 | 3,583 | | 24.8% |
| 1940 | 3,682 | | 2.8% |
| 1950 | 4,951 | | 34.5% |
| 1960 | 5,218 | | 5.4% |
| 1970 | 6,395 | | 22.6% |
| 1980 | 9,468 | | 48.1% |
| 1990 | 14,842 | | 56.8% |
| 2000 | 28,339 | | 90.9% |
| 2010 | 47,400 | | 67.3% |
| 2020 | 67,176 | | 41.7% |
| 2025 (est.) | 106,907 | | 59.1% |
U.S. Decennial Census; Texas Almanac: 1850-2000; 2020 Census

=== Racial and ethnic composition ===
Racial composition as of the 2020 census (NH = Non-Hispanic) (Note: Note: the US Census treats Hispanic/Latino as an ethnic category. This table excludes Latinos from the racial categories and assigns them to a separate category. Hispanics/Latinos can be of any race.)
| Race | Number | Percent |
|---|---|---|
| White | 49,656 | 73.9% |
| Black or African American | 3,190 | 4.7% |
| American Indian and Alaska Native | 447 | 0.7% |
| Asian | 1,392 | 2.1% |
| Native Hawaiian and Other Pacific Islander | 67 | 0.1% |
| Some other race | 4,078 | 6.1% |
| Two or more races | 8,346 | 12.4% |
| Hispanic or Latino (of any race) | 14,445 | 21.5% |

=== 2020 census ===
As of the 2020 census, there were 67,176 people, 28,845 households, and 18,965 families residing in the city. The median age was 47.0 years; 18.5% of residents were under the age of 18, 4.8% were under 5 years of age, and 31.0% were 65 years of age or older. For every 100 females there were 89.1 males, and for every 100 females age 18 and over there were 85.9 males age 18 and over.

The city had 31,265 housing units, of which 7.7% were vacant; the homeowner vacancy rate was 2.3% and the rental vacancy rate was 11.3%, and the population density was 1,171.7 people per square mile. 98.0% of residents lived in urban areas while 2.0% lived in rural areas.

Of the 28,845 households in Georgetown, 22.7% had children under the age of 18 living in them. Of all households, 53.0% were married-couple households, 13.7% were households with a male householder and no spouse or partner present, and 28.6% were households with a female householder and no spouse or partner present. About 29.6% of all households were made up of individuals and 17.5% had someone living alone who was 65 years of age or older.

== Economy ==
=== Top employers ===
According to the City's 2023 Annual Comprehensive Financial Report, the largest employers in the city are:

| # | Employer | # of Employees |
|---|---|---|
| 1 | Williamson County Government | 1,582 |
| 2 | Georgetown ISD | 1,550 |
| 3 | City of Georgetown | 670 |
| 4 | St. David's Hospital | 512 |
| 5 | Airborn, Inc. | 482 |
| 6 | Southwestern University | 450 |
| 7 | Wesleyan Homes | 340 |
| 8 | HE Butt Grocery | 283 |
| 9 | Caring Home Health | 263 |
| 10 | Sun City (Del Webb) | 170 |
| — | Total employers | 6,302 |

=== Interstate Highway 35 location ===
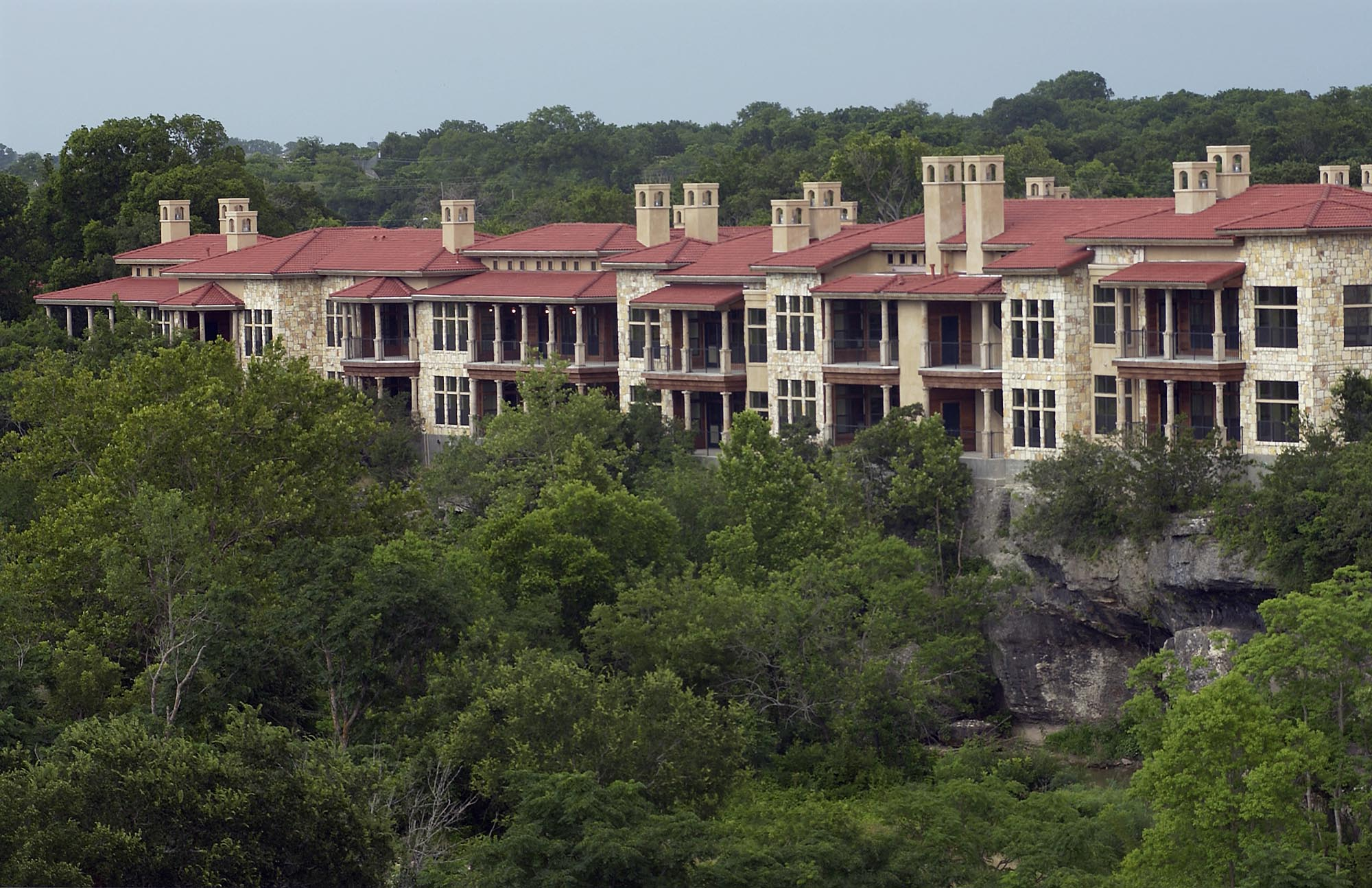
A residential condominium project overlooking the San Gabriel River is part of the San Gabriel Village mixed-use "walk-friendly" development. Photo by Don Martin.

The single most important issue relating to economic development was the location of Interstate 35 through Georgetown. Originally, when first conceived, a Georgetown route was very much in doubt, as most alignments had the road going through or near Taylor. At the time, Taylor was the economic hub of Williamson County as the center for cotton and cattle. While the Taylor leadership supported the Taylor route, local farmers opposed it. The interstate required then-unheard-of 300 feet (91 m) wide of right of way across the entire county and through nearby Taylor farms, and many farmers worried that their homes might get cut off from their fields. Also, concerns were expressed about noise relating to cattle and other farm animals. Meanwhile, Round Rock and Georgetown leadership strongly lobbied for a route along the Balcones Escarpment fault line, which would later become U.S. Highway 81 and then eventually I-35.

=== Sun City ===
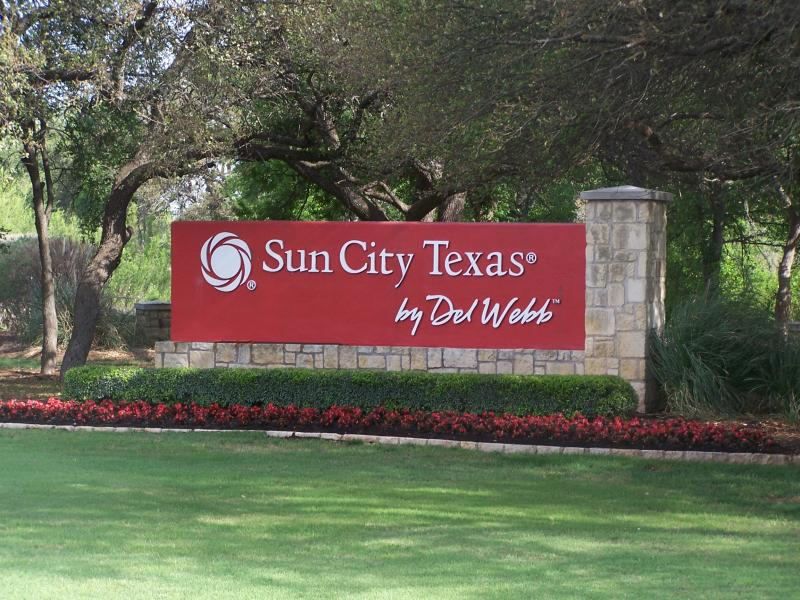
Sun City has had a significant impact on Georgetown in terms of population and demographics.

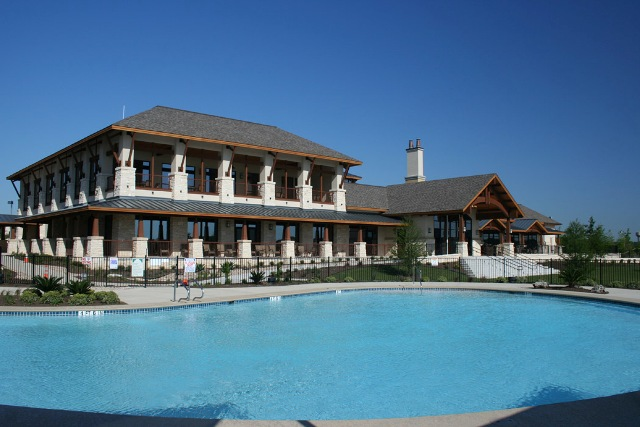
A Sun City Texas pool at the most recent neighborhood amenity center at Cowan Creek

The second-largest economic development activity in Georgetown history was the selection in 1995 of Georgetown as the site for the first-ever Sun City location in Texas. Originally called Sun City Georgetown, the project today is called Sun City Texas due to its size and because it draws residents from all over the state. As of 2021, about 15,700 people live in the massive, 4,700-acre (and expanding) community, with an average net worth over $1,000,000 per person. The economic stimulus, creation of sales tax, banking and investment, and the high rate of community support and volunteerism has had an enormous effect on Georgetown.

Opened in June 1995, Sun City Texas is a 5,300-acre (21 km^{2}) age-restricted community located in Georgetown, about 10 miles west of I-35 on Williams Drive (RM 2338). It is part of the chain of Sun City communities started by the Del E. Webb Construction Company (now a division of PulteGroup). Residency is restricted to persons over age 55 (at least one person in a couple has to be 55 or older). Sun City Texas is made up mostly of single-family dwellings, but also has duplexes. It is legal to drive golf carts on the streets in the development (under a special Texas license exemption with help from Del Webb), and most shopping and the community facilities all have special parking slots for them.

Opposition to the project has been vocal at times, especially at the start during the zoning process, with arguments against the size of the community, its effect on Georgetown as a family-oriented town, concerns about the costs of providing city utilities, concern about lowered property taxes fixed for retirees under Texas law, and the disproportionate effect of city voting.

Numerous other active adult communities are also found in Georgetown, including the well-respected Wesleyan at Estrella, the Oaks at Wildwood, Heritage Oaks, and many others. Various projects offer differing levels of care, including assisted living. The city, county, and churches also maintain compassionate-care facilities for the elderly at the Bluebonnet Community Residence.

=== Energy policy ===
Georgetown is the first Texas city to operate entirely on renewable energy. Georgetown's projected power expenditures were $33 million for 2016 (spent $40 million); $39 million for 2017 (spent $46 million) and $45 million for 2018 (spent $53 million). It made up the shortfall through lower capital investments, rate adjustments, and "higher revenue" (tax). The average home power bill in the city increased 22% in 2019 compared to 2018.

== Government and politics ==
=== City government ===
The City of Georgetown is a home rule city and adopted its initial home-rule charter on April 24, 1970. As provided by its charter, Georgetown has a council-manager form of government. Under this form of government, the city council provides leadership by establishing the city's goals and policies. The city council appoints a full-time city manager to achieve the desired end set by the city council. The manager oversees the day-to-day activities of the city and all city departments and executes council-established laws and policies. The city council is composed of seven council members elected by geographic districts:

- District 1 – Amanda Parr
- District 2 – Shawn Hood
- District 3 – Ben Butler
- District 4 – Ron Garland
- District 5 – Kevin Pitts
- District 6 – Jake French
- District 7 – Ben Steward

A mayor is elected at-large. Each position is elected for a term of three years, with council districts with staggered election dates. Lloyd "Dale" Ross was elected mayor in 2015 and served until 2020. Josh Schroeder was elected mayor in 2020 with 64.54% of the vote and reelected in May 2023 with 85.6% of the vote. He will serve until May 2026. David Morgan was hired by the City Council as the City Manager in 2015.

=== State and national representation ===
- Texas House of Representatives:
  - State Representative District 20 – Terry Wilson (R) – elected November 2012
  - State Representative District 52 – James Talarico (D) – elected November 2018
- Texas Senate
  - Texas Senate District 5 – Charles Schwertner (R) – elected November 2012
- United States House of Representatives:
  - Texas's 31st congressional district – John R. Carter (R)

== Education ==
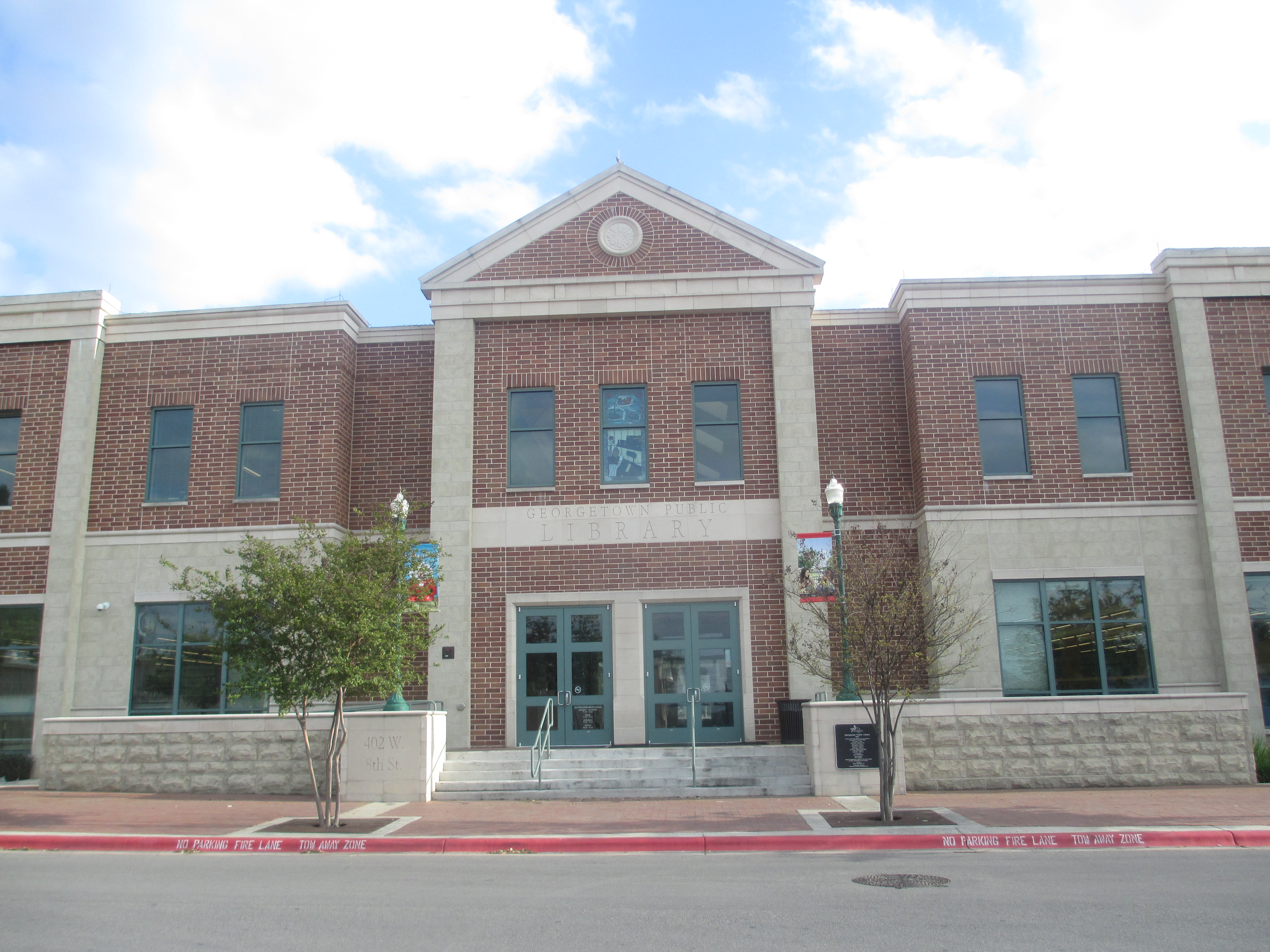
The Georgetown Public Library

The city of Georgetown is served by the Georgetown Independent School District, partially by Leander Independent School District and Georgetown High School, a National Blue Ribbon Award school, serves the community. Georgetown opened a second high school, East View High, in 2008. The graduating class of 2014 was the first class of students to graduate from East View as a full high school. Up to that point, East View High School had started as a freshman-only campus and added on one grade at a time as those students moved up.

Georgetown is the home of Southwestern University, a private, four-year, undergraduate, liberal arts college. Founded in 1840, Southwestern is the oldest university in Texas. The school is affiliated with the United Methodist Church, although the curriculum is nonsectarian. Southwestern offers 40 bachelor's degrees in the arts, sciences, fine arts, and music, as well as interdisciplinary and pre-professional programs. The university is accredited by the Southern Association of Colleges and Schools and the National Association of Schools of Music.

== Sites of interest ==
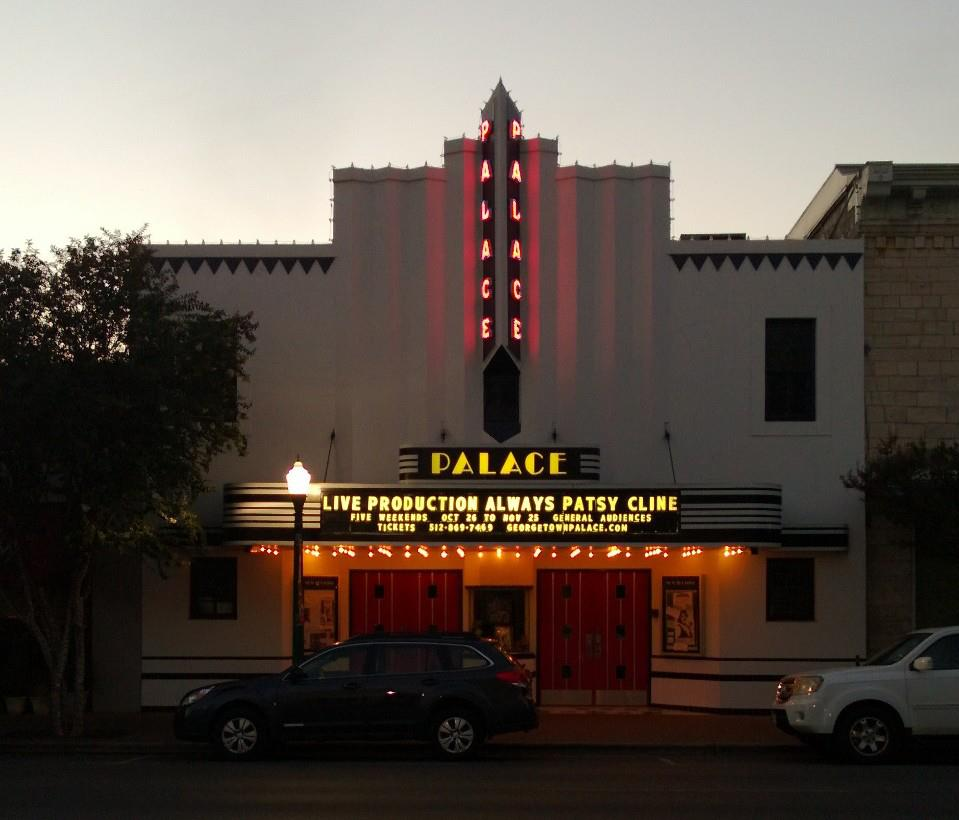
The Palace Theatre is a historic theater in downtown Georgetown.

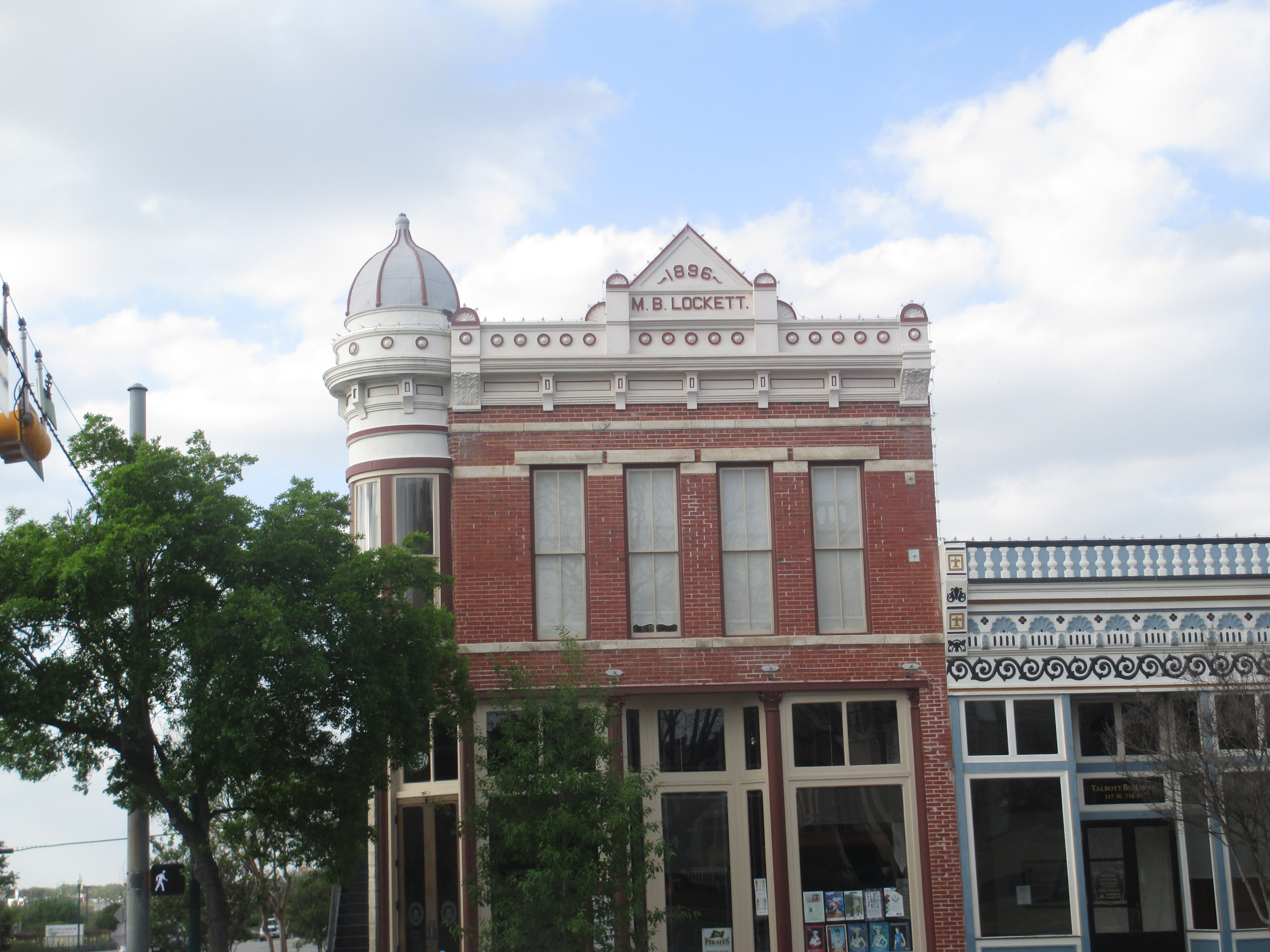
The unusually designed M. B. Lockett Building in Courthouse Square in Georgetown

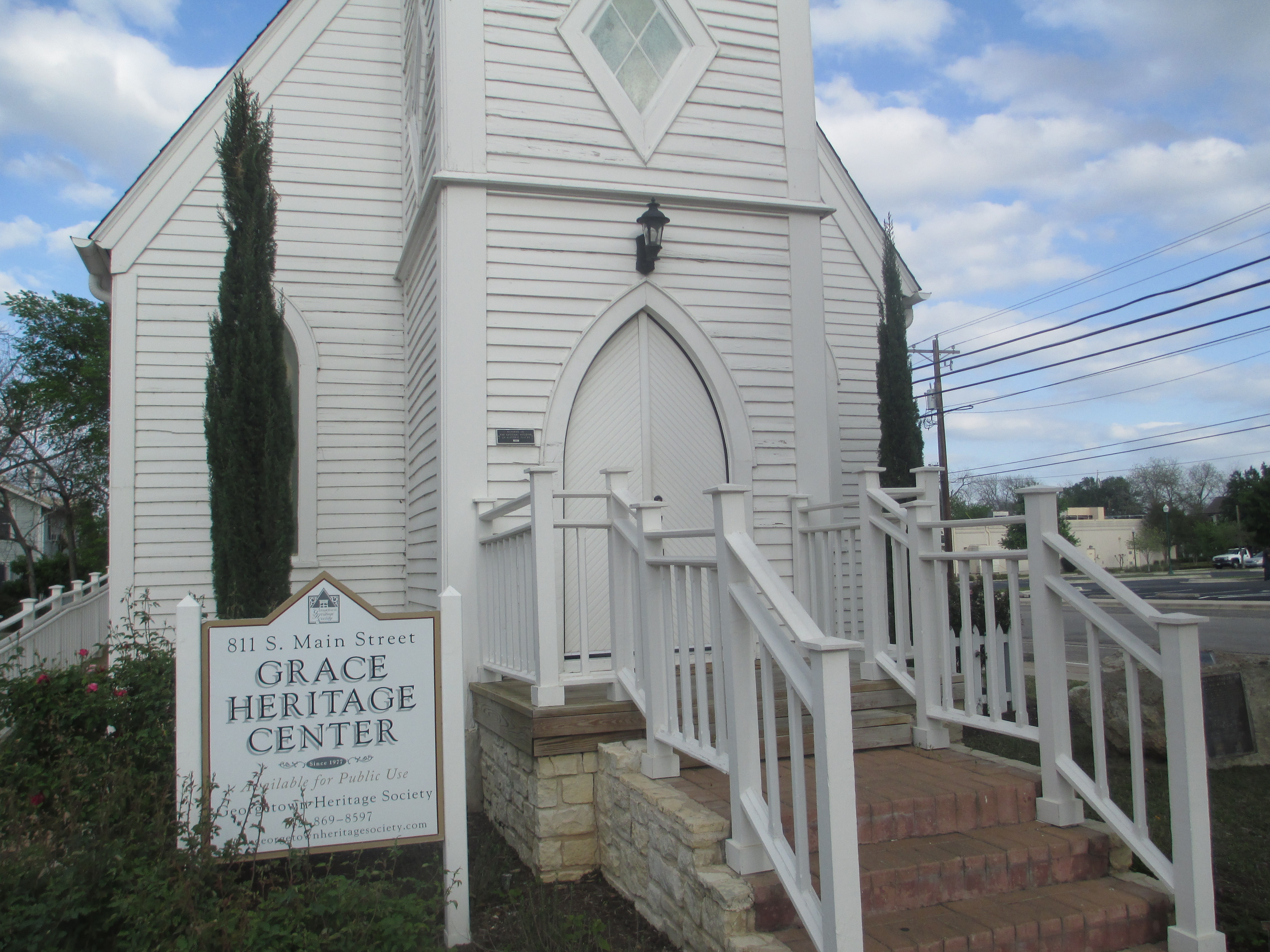
The Grace Heritage Center is located in a former church building downtown.

- Williamson County Courthouse
- Williamson County Art Guild
- Berry Springs Park
- Sun City Texas
- Blue Hole Park
- San Gabriel Park
- Georgetown Firefighters Museum
- Inner Space Cavern
- Lake Georgetown
- Georgetown Municipal Airport
- The Levy House
- Palace Theatre
- Georgetown Art Center
- Garey Park
- Booty's Park

== In popular culture ==
List partly from material provided by the Texas Film Commission

- Friday Night Lights, both the film and the TV series
- Leadbelly
- Grindhouse
- Bernie
- My Boyfriend's Back
- Natural Selection
- The Big Picture
- Picnic
- Über Goober
- Pair of Aces
- What's Eating Gilbert Grape
- Night Job
- Johnny Be Good
- Michael – a 1996 Nora Ephron film
- Varsity Blues
- Lemmy Lemmy
- Where the Heart Is
- Shady Grove
- The Prophet of Armageddon
- Dazed and Confused
- Hope Floats
- Temple Grandin
- Men, Women & Children

== Notable people ==
- Brian Anderson, sports announcer: Turner Sports, Milwaukee Brewers
- Mason Crosby, NFL kicker, Green Bay Packers, 2010 Super Bowl XLV champion
- Matt Dominguez, a Grey Cup winner and 2006 All-Star wide receiver with the Saskatchewan Roughriders of the Canadian Football League
- Thomas Fletcher, NFL Long Snapper
- Conan Gray, singer-songwriter, internet personality, awarded 'Best YouTube Musician' at the 2019 Shorty Award
- Ryan Ludwick, a Major League Baseball outfielder who last played for the Cincinnati Reds
- Granger Smith, singer-songwriter, Country Music, 2016 BMI Awards won the BMI Country Award, 2017 IHeartRadio Music Awards nominated for Best New Country Artist
- James Willbanks, military historian
- Paul Wall, rapper
