= Blue Hole Park =

Lagoon and park in Georgetown, Texas, U.S.

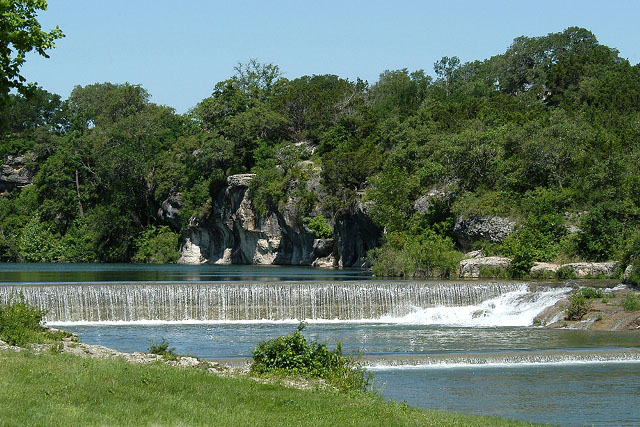
- The park in 2010

- Location within Texas
- Location: Georgetown, Texas, United States
- Coordinates: 30°38′35″N 97°40′48″W
- Type: Lagoon
- River sources: San Gabriel River

Blue Hole Park is lagoon and park along the South Fork of the San Gabriel River, in Georgetown, Texas, United States.
