= Lake Georgetown =

Lake in central Texas, United States

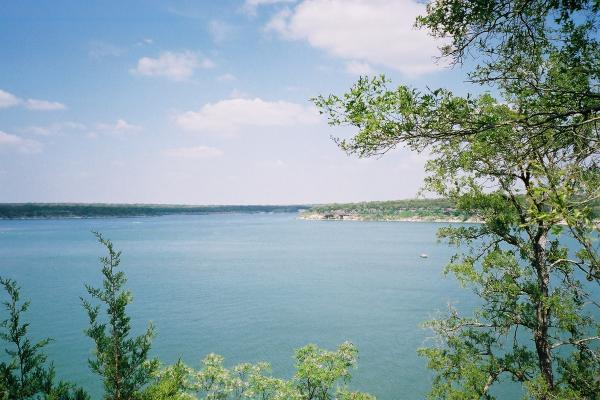
- View from the Good Water Trail

- Location within Texas Location within the United States
- Location: Williamson County, Texas
- Coordinates: 30°40.0′N 97°43.4′W
- Type: Flood control reservoir
- Primary inflows: San Gabriel River
- Primary outflows: San Gabriel River
- Basin countries: United States
- Surface area: 1,297 acres (5.25 km^{2})
- Max. depth: 85 ft (26 m)
- Surface elevation: 791 ft (241 m)

Lake Georgetown is a reservoir on the north fork of the San Gabriel River in central Texas in the United States. Lake Georgetown is a U.S. Army Corps of Engineers reservoir formed on the San Gabriel by the North San Gabriel Dam, which is located about three miles west of Georgetown, Texas. The dam, lake and all adjacent property are managed by the Fort Worth District of the Corps of Engineers. The dam was officially completed on October 5, 1979, and serves to provide flood control for the community of Georgetown. Lake Georgetown, a popular recreational destination, is also a source of drinking water for Georgetown and the nearby city of Round Rock.

The only other reservoir on the San Gabriel River is Granger Lake, located near Granger, Texas about 25 airline miles downstream of Lake Georgetown.

== Fish populations ==
Lake Georgetown has been stocked with several species of fish intended to improve the utility of the reservoir for recreational fishing. Fish present in Lake Georgetown include largemouth bass, catfish, white bass, hybrid striped bass, crappie, and sunfish.

== Recreational uses ==
In addition to maintaining the dam that creates the reservoir, the U.S. Army Corps of Engineers maintains recreational facilities at the lake. Cedar Breaks Park, Russell Park, Jim Hogg Park and Overlook Park include day-use areas for picnics. Cedar Breaks, Jim Hogg and Russell Parks have boat ramp facilities for recreational boating. No camping is permitted at Overlook Park (the only free entry park on the lake).

The Goodwater Trail is a 26-mile-long (42 km) hiking trail that follows the entire perimeter of the lake with trailheads at Cedar Breaks, Overlook, Jim Hogg, and Russell Park. Tejas Camp, while technically on the San Gabriel River and not on the lake, also has trail access and is the only other entry or exit point to the southern half of the trail than Cedar Breaks. Mountain biking is allowed on the entire length of the loop thanks to the Austin Ridge Riders group for their work on the southern half of the trail. Beginner riders would be wise to stay on the North shore as it permits shorter trips with water refilling available and multiple exits. The southern shore presents a much more challenging ride with its rocky terrain and steep drop-offs and is not recommended for beginners. Also, there are no water refilling stations or trail exits on the approximately 12 miles between Cedar Breaks and Camp Tejas.

Overnight primitive camping is allowed at Sawyer Park, roughly halfway between Cedar Breaks and Tejas.
