= Berry Springs Park =

County park in Texas, USA

Coordinates: 30.684°N 97.642°W

Berry Springs Park and Preserve
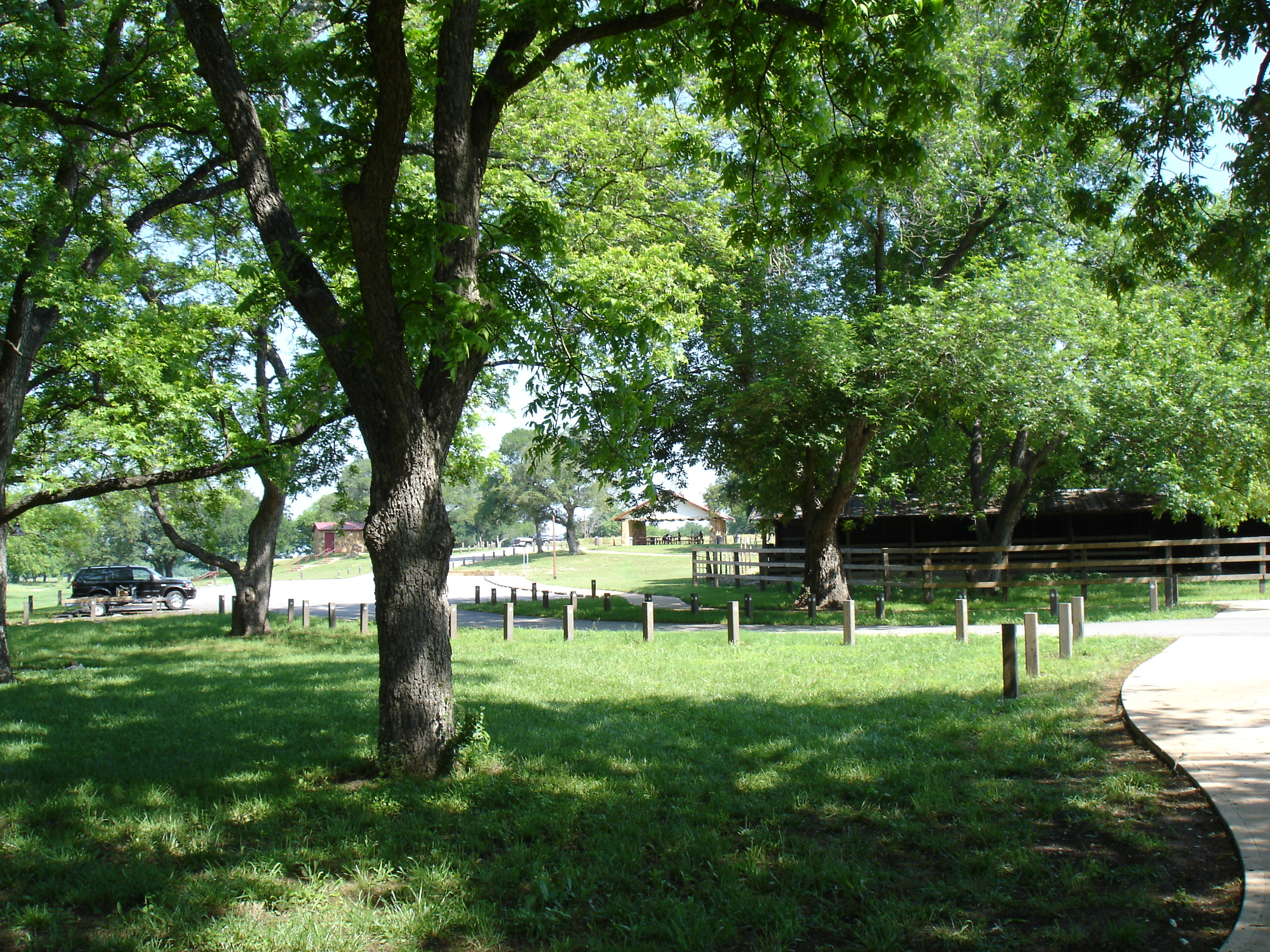
- View from parking lot to one of the pavilions
- Interactive map of Berry Springs Park and Preserve
- Type: Park
- Location: Williamson County, Texas
- Nearest city: Georgetown

Berry Springs Park and Preserve is a park in and of Williamson County, Texas close to the city of Georgetown, Texas. The park is on farm land with many pecan and oak trees as well as the waters of Berry Springs that provide a lake for fishing with fresh water. It is bounded on two sides by Berry Creek and Dry Berry Creek.

== Activities ==
Activities include hiking, bicycling, horse-riding, fishing, bird-watching and camping. At the northwest end of the park is a Nature Trail traversing forest, savanna and riparian habitats.

== Facilities ==
Facilities include barbecue grills, picnic tables and pavilions. There are children's playgrounds. The pavilions can be rented for a fee. Both primitive and improved campsites are available. The park has restrooms and water fountains.

== Gallery ==
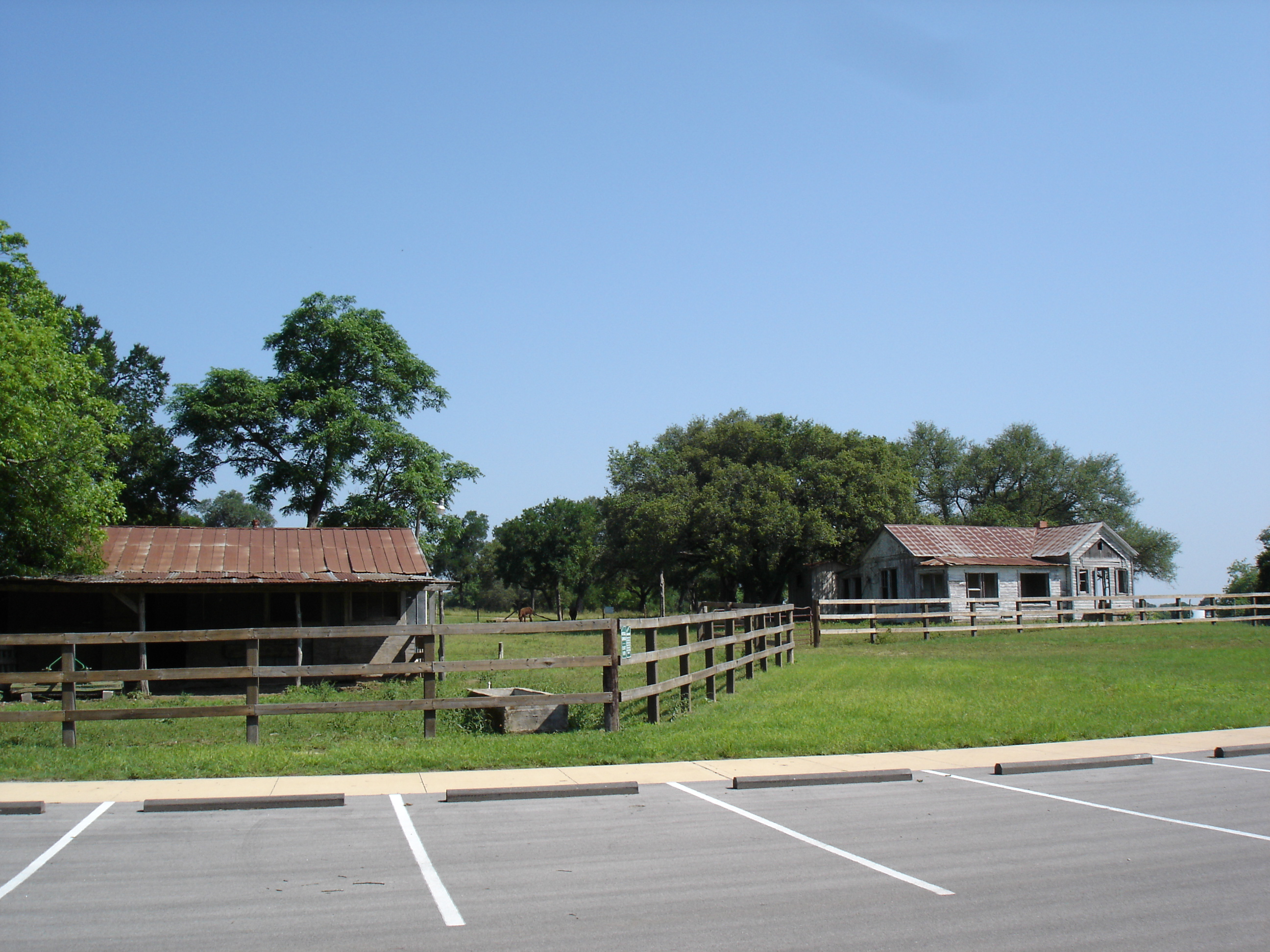
View from parking lot to one of the historical houses

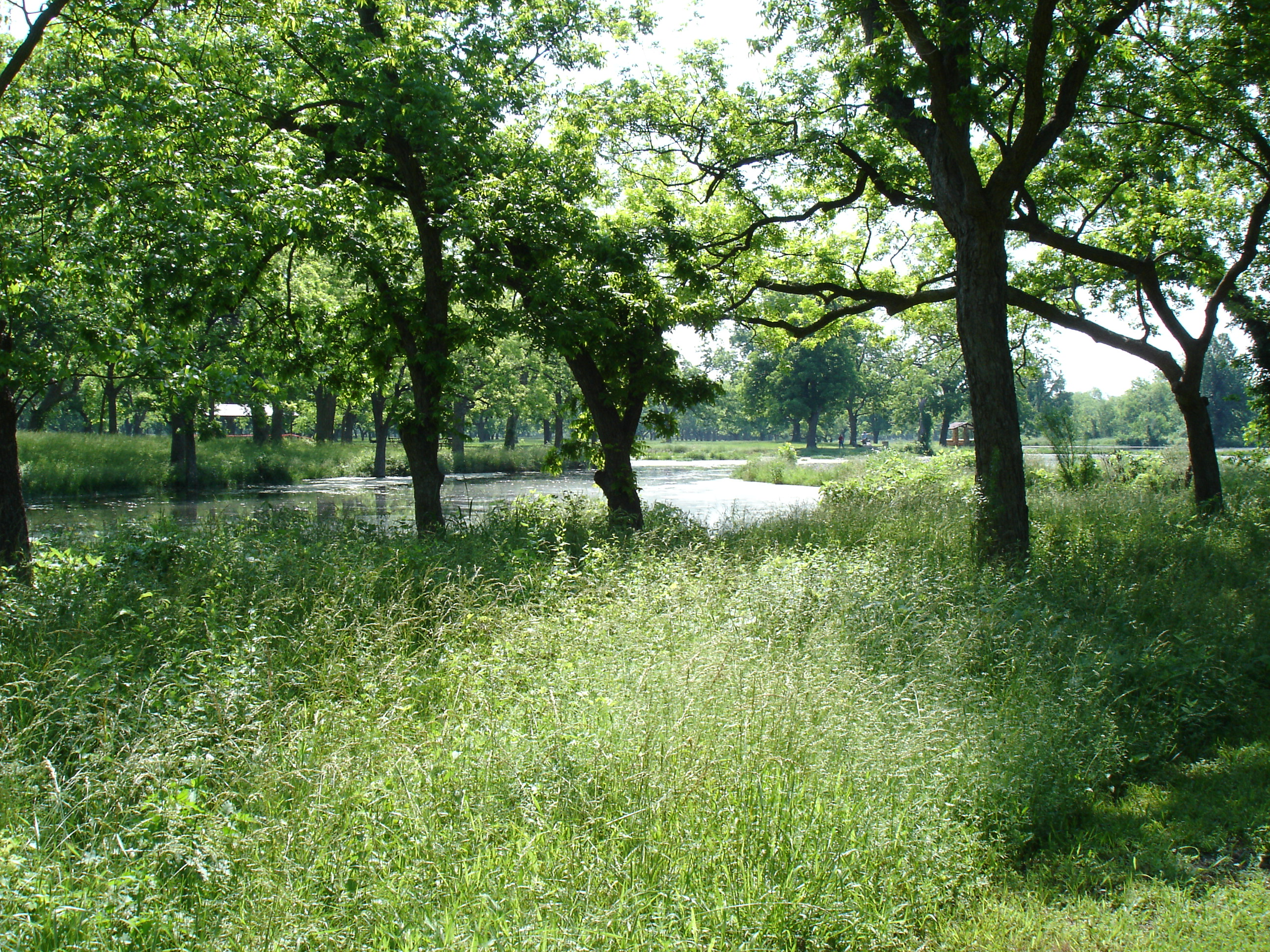
View from the trail over the little lake

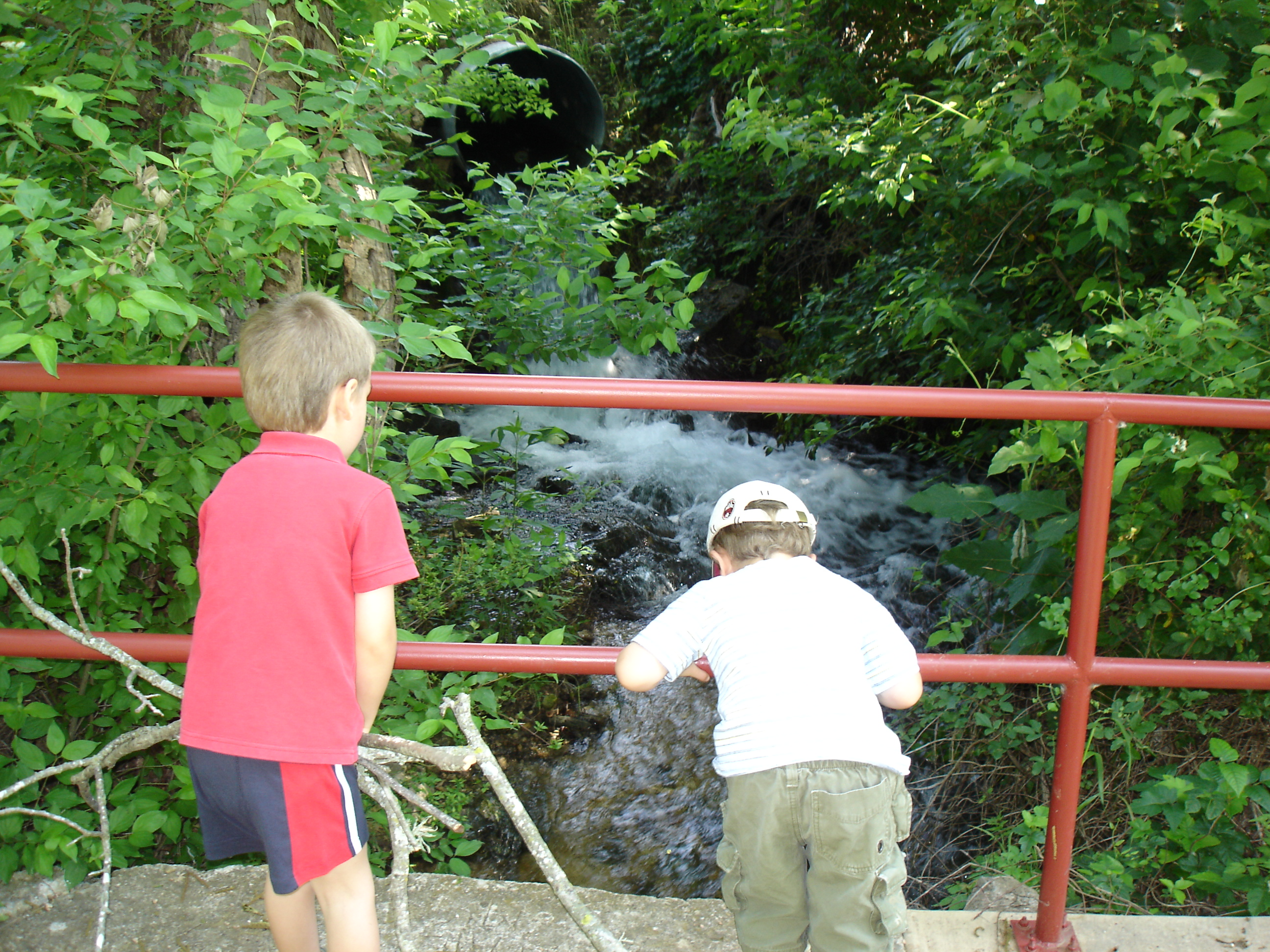
Little waterfall above the main spring

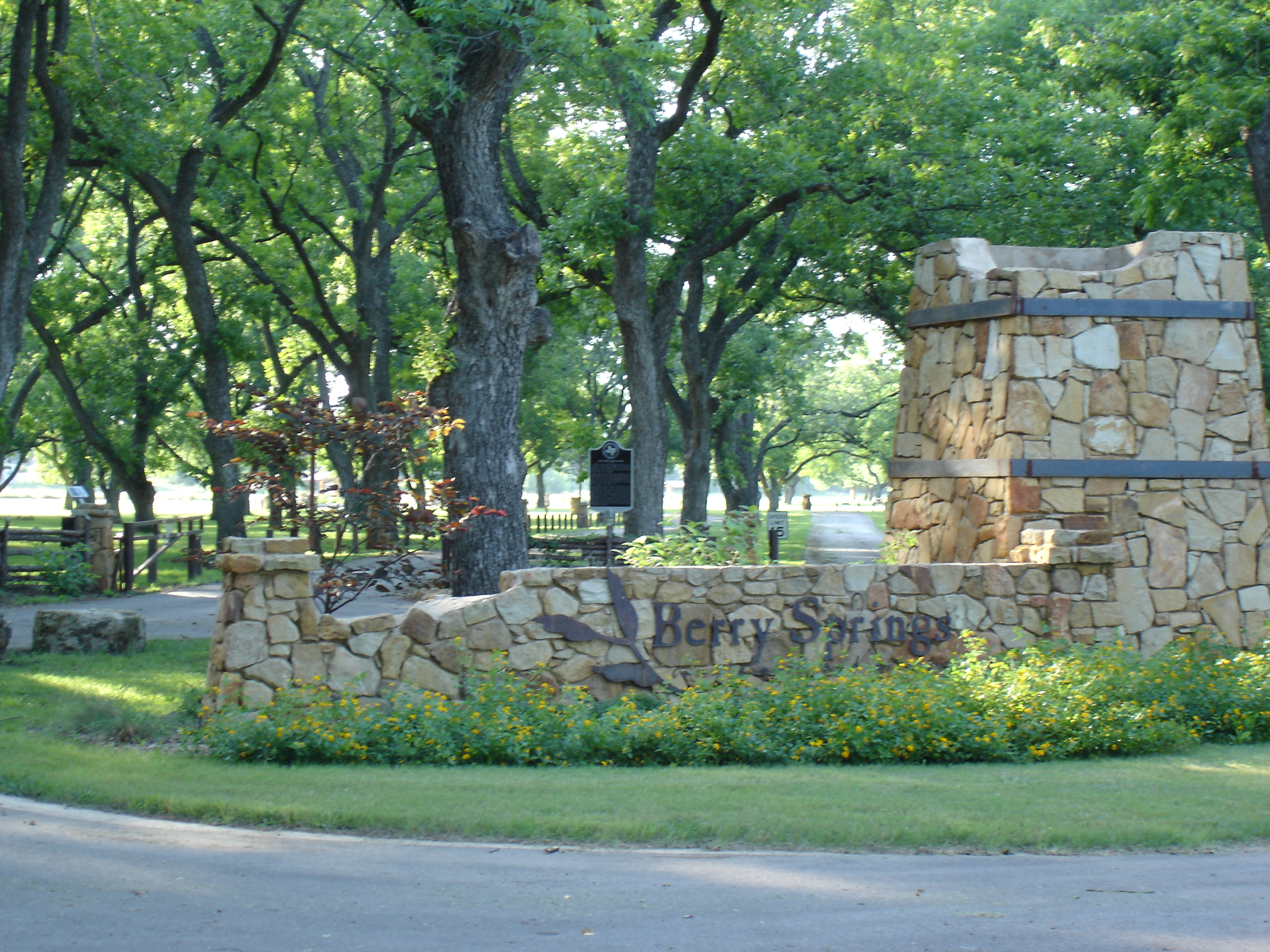
Berry Springs Park entrance

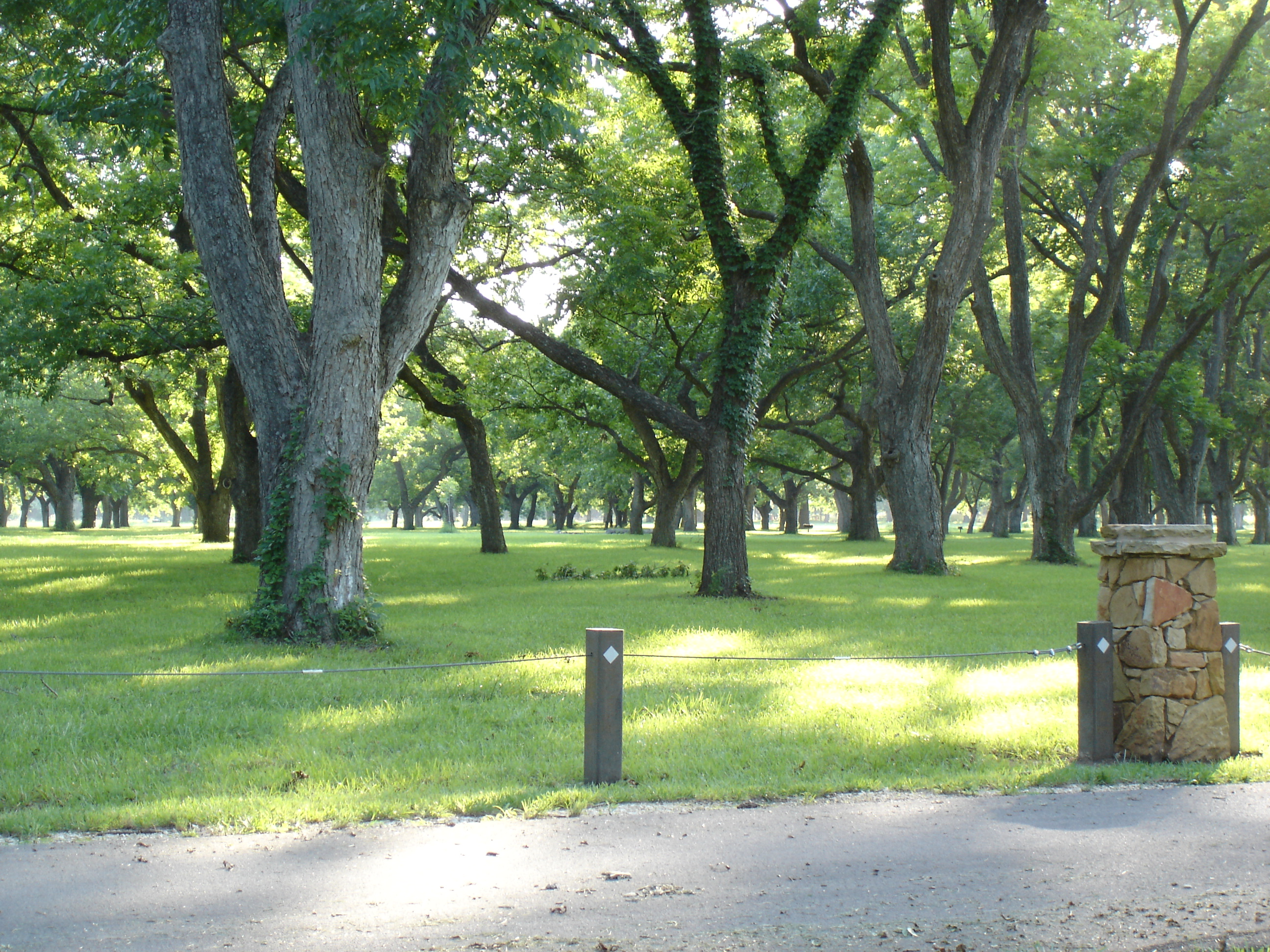
Pecan Grove

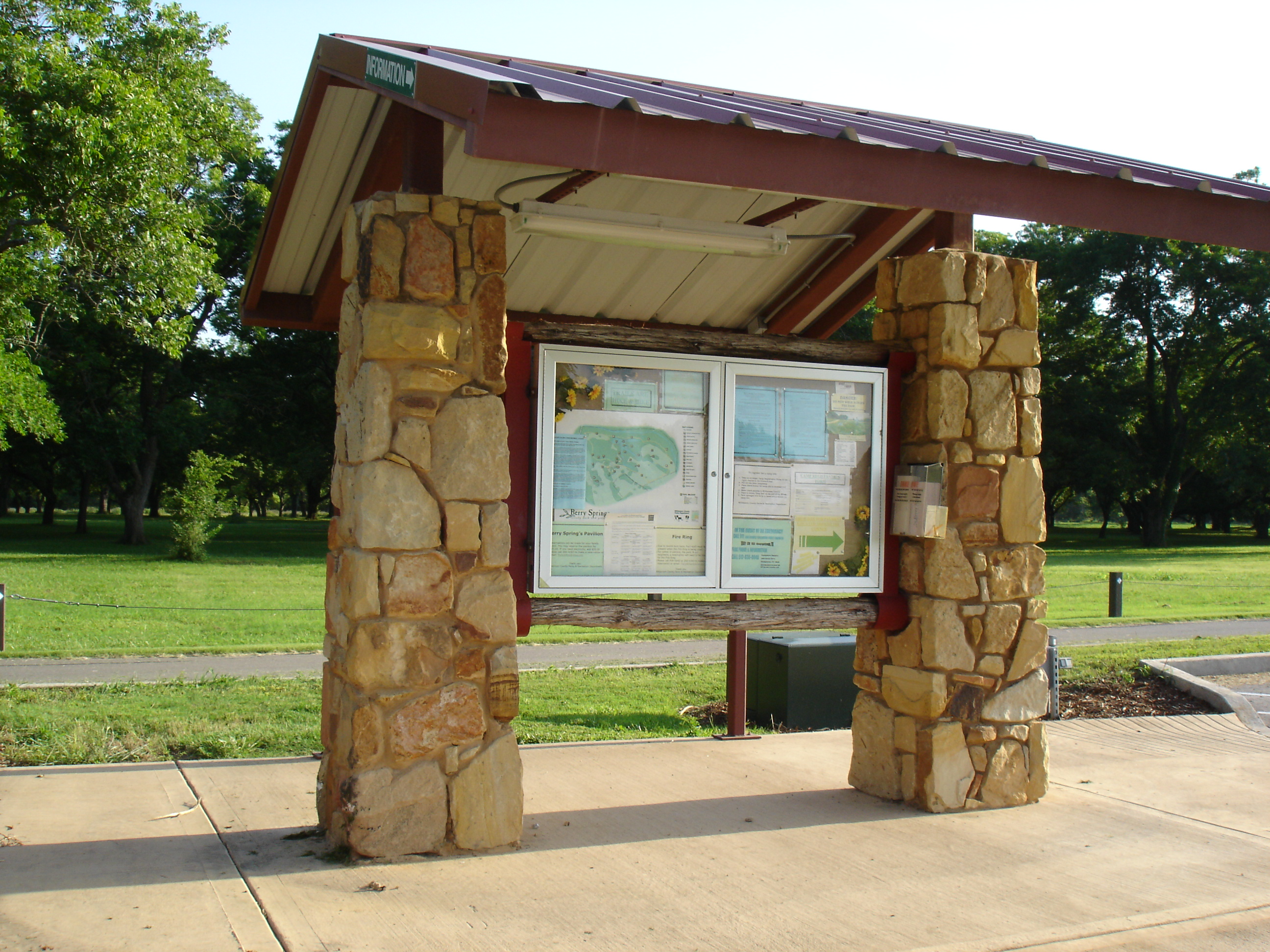
Information Kiosk

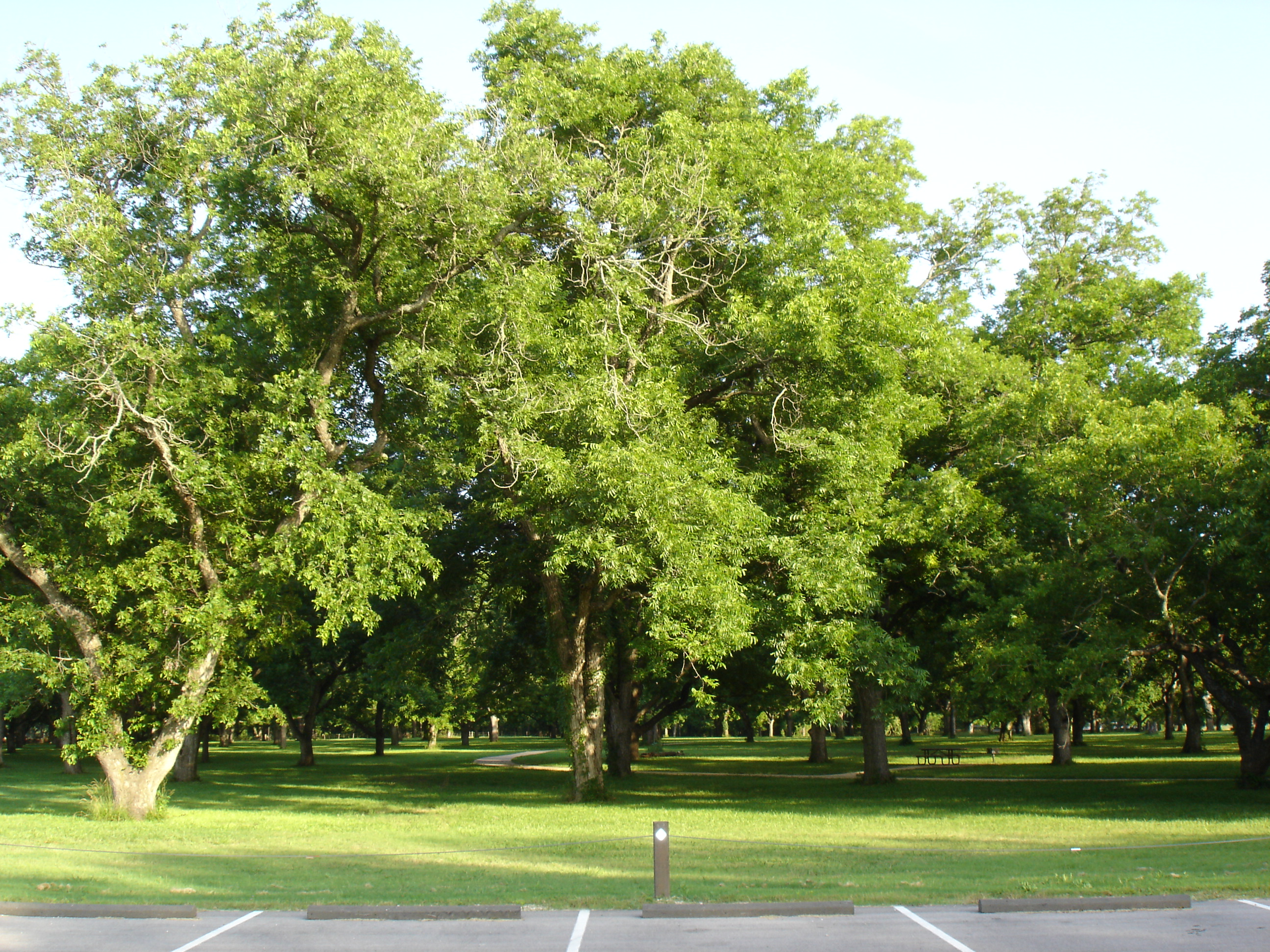
Berry Springs Park

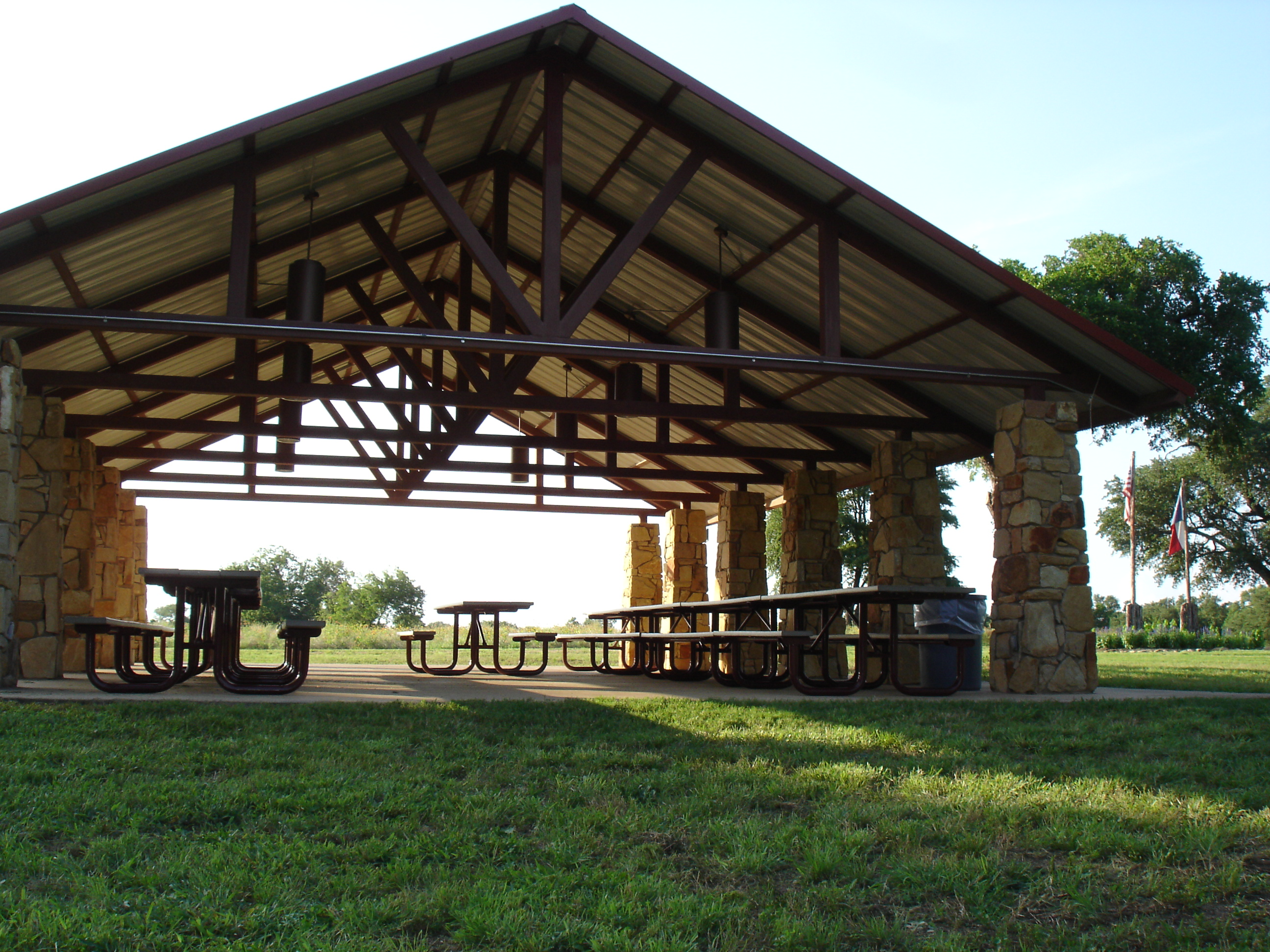
40 seat pavilion

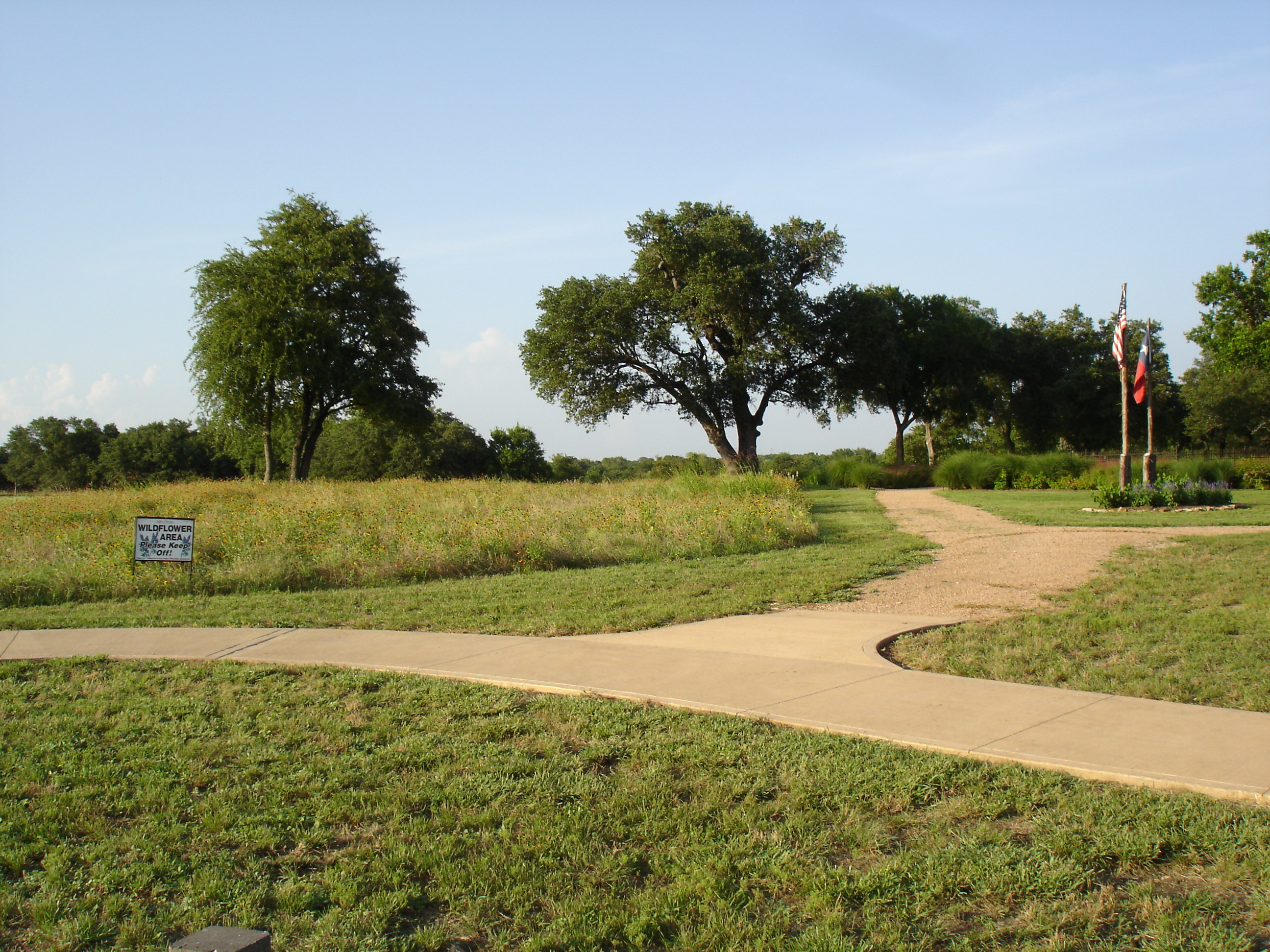
Trail and wild flowers

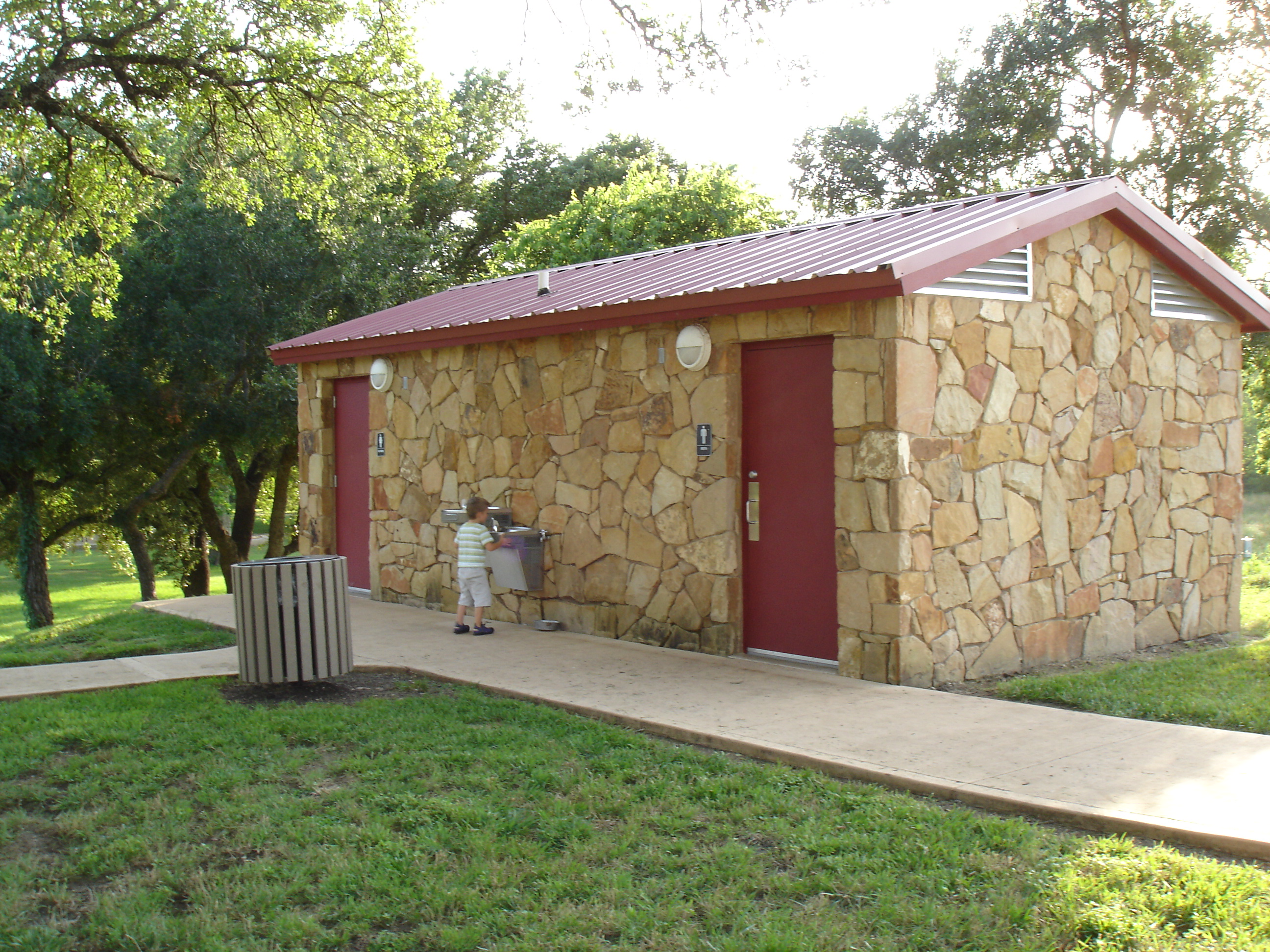
Main Restrooms

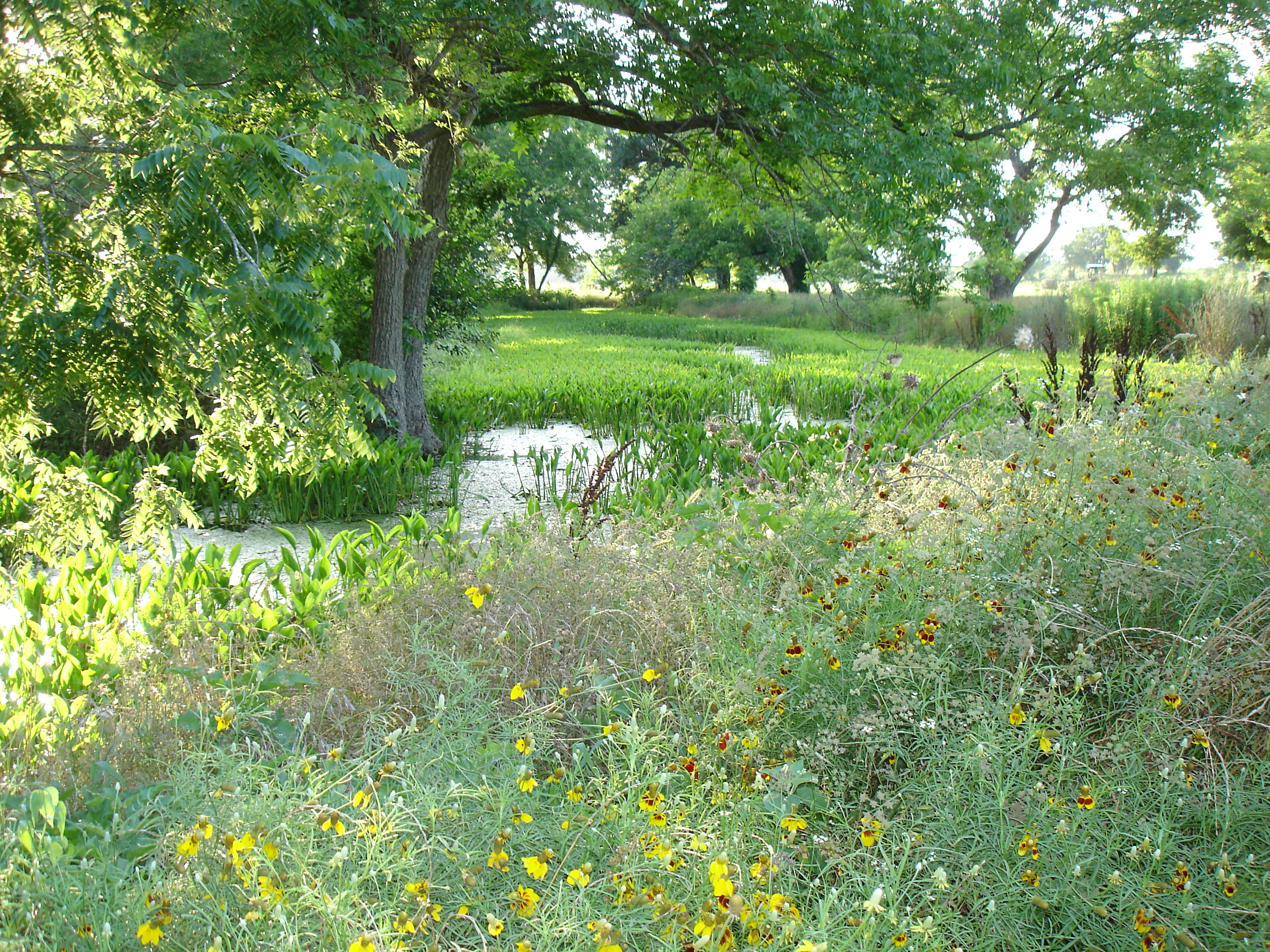
Wild flowers along a waterway

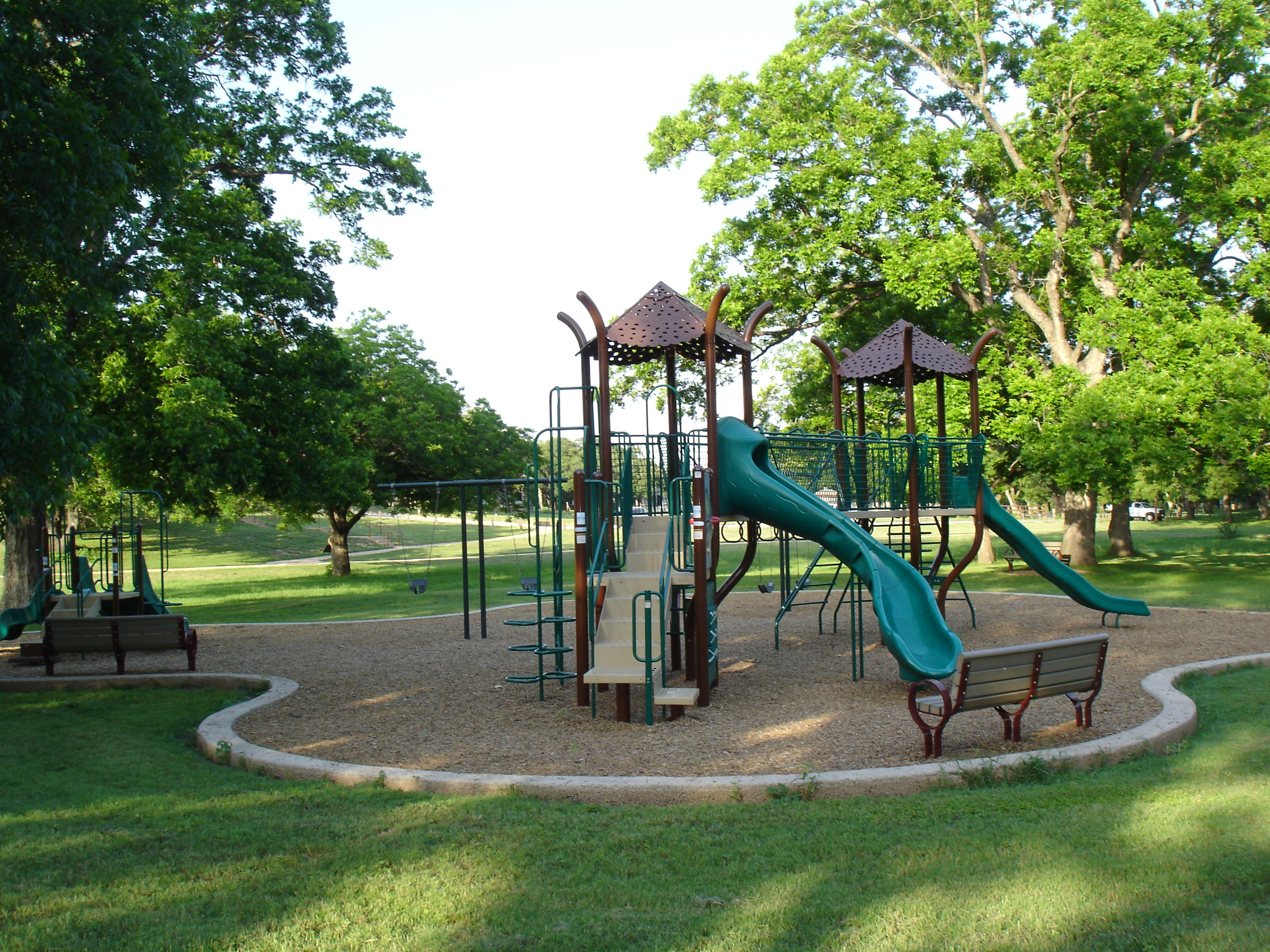
Playground

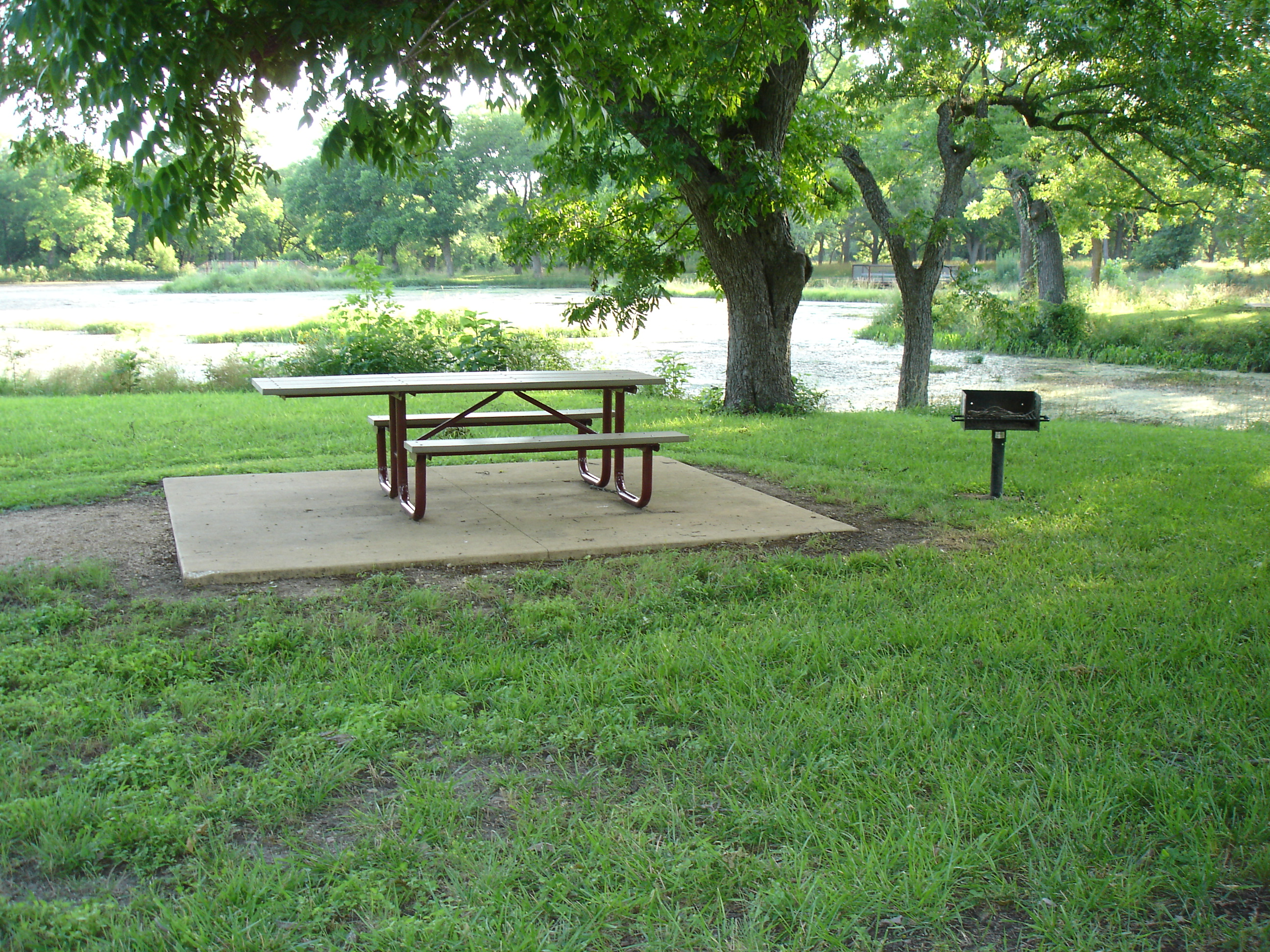
BBQ grill area

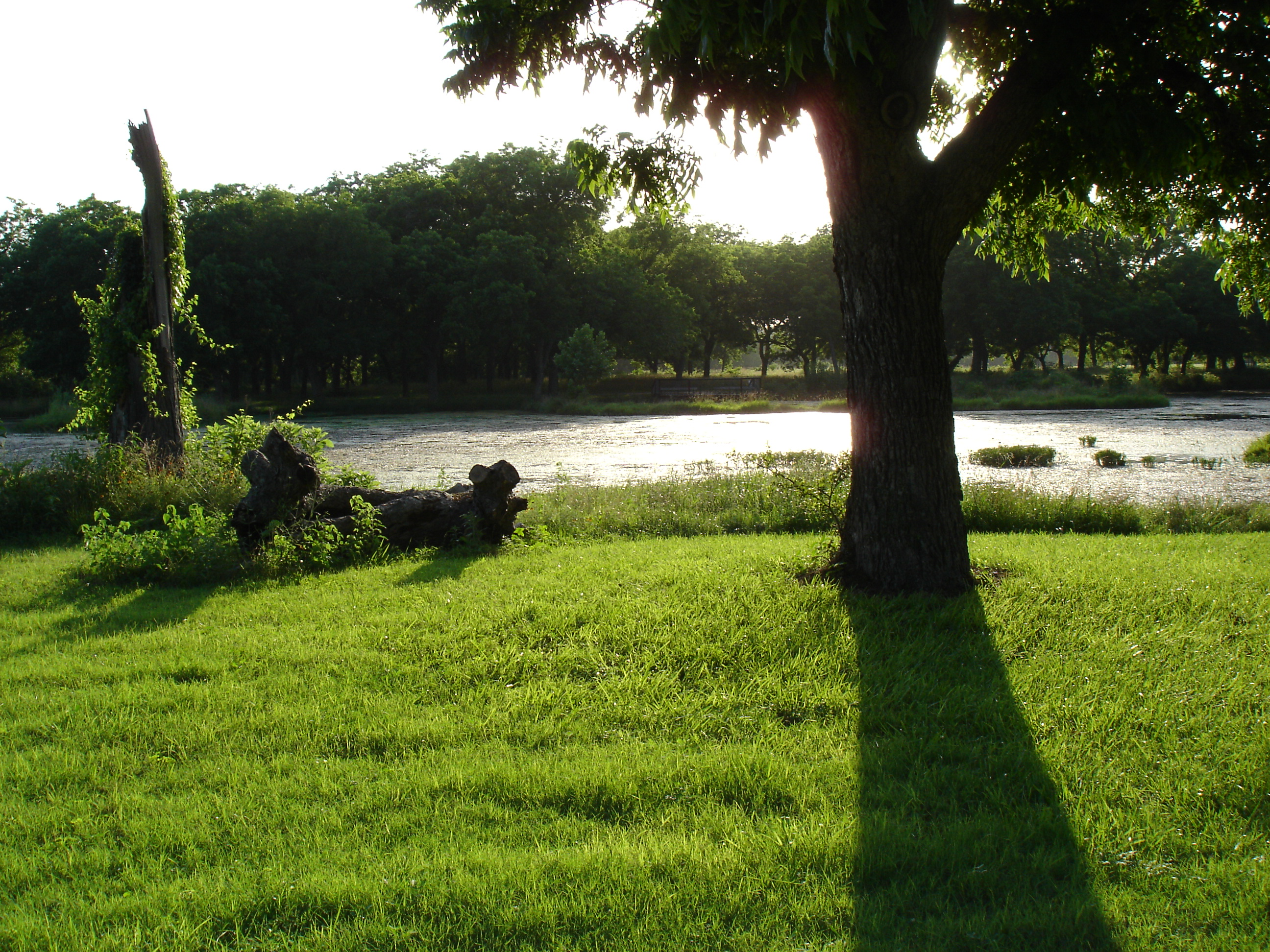
Sunset at Berry Springs Park

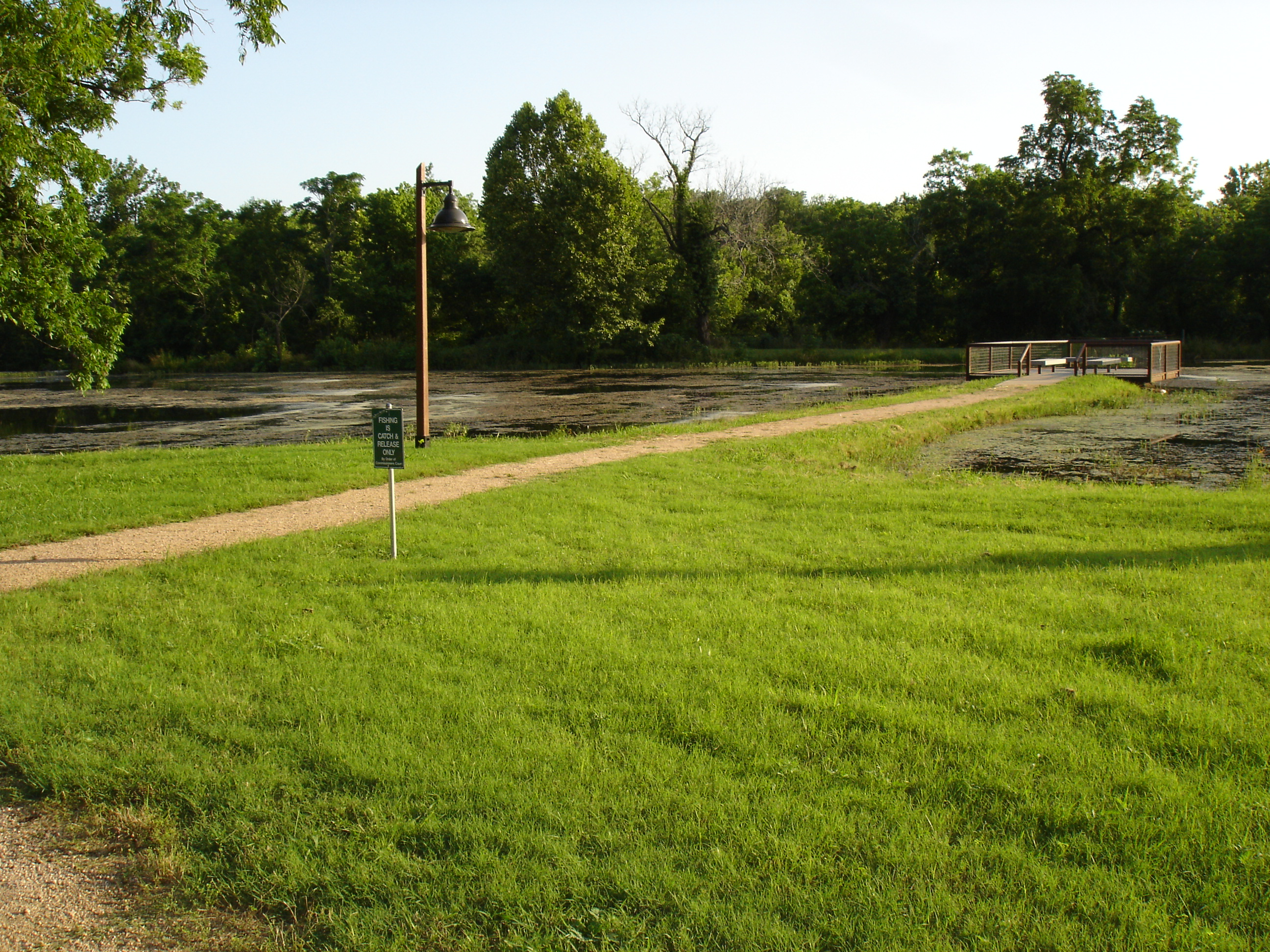
Berry Springs Park trail

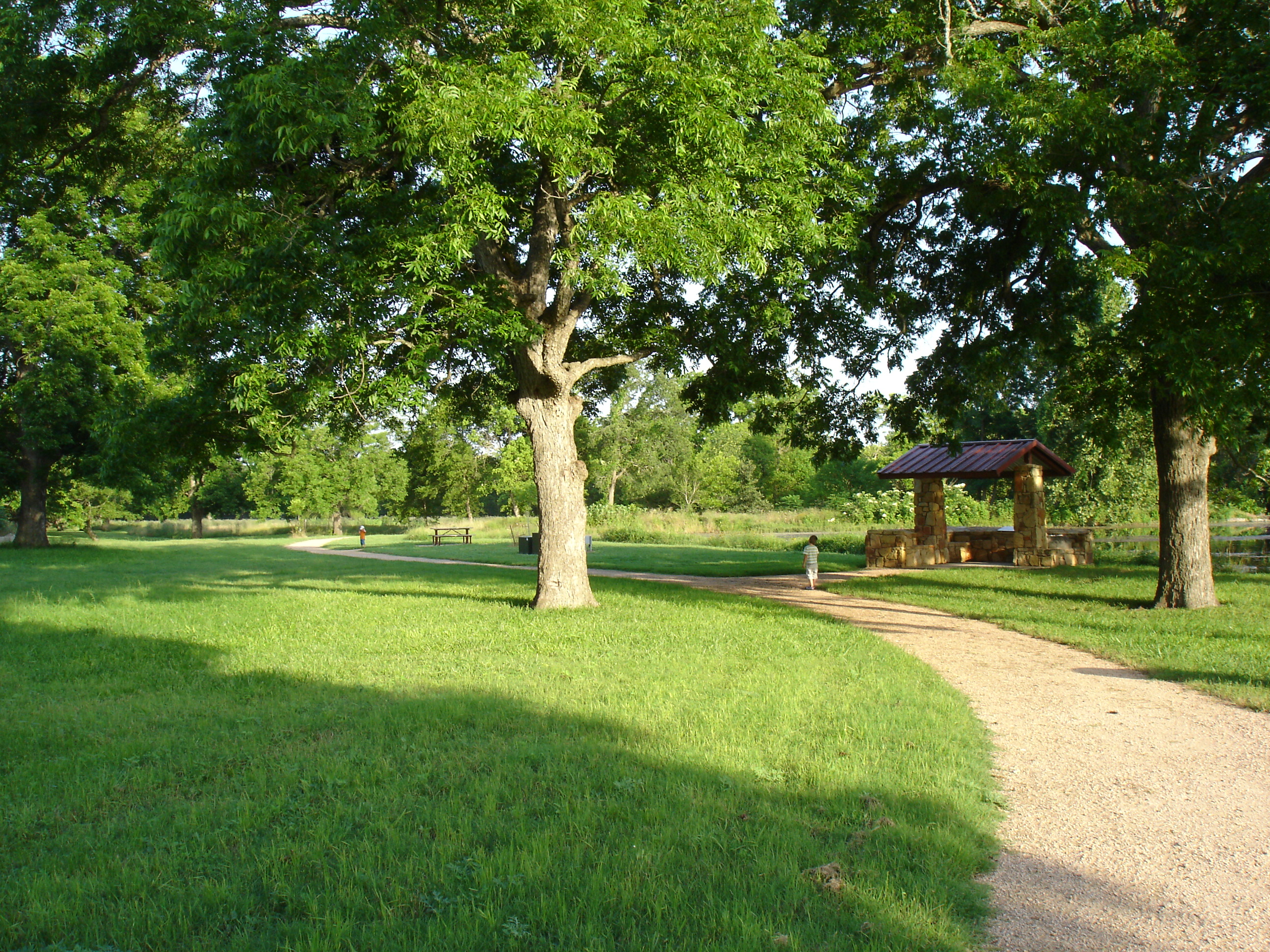
Berry Springs Park trail
