= San Gabriel River (Texas) =

River in central Texas, US

Coordinates: 30.7605°N 97.0144°W

San Gabriel River Río San Gabriel
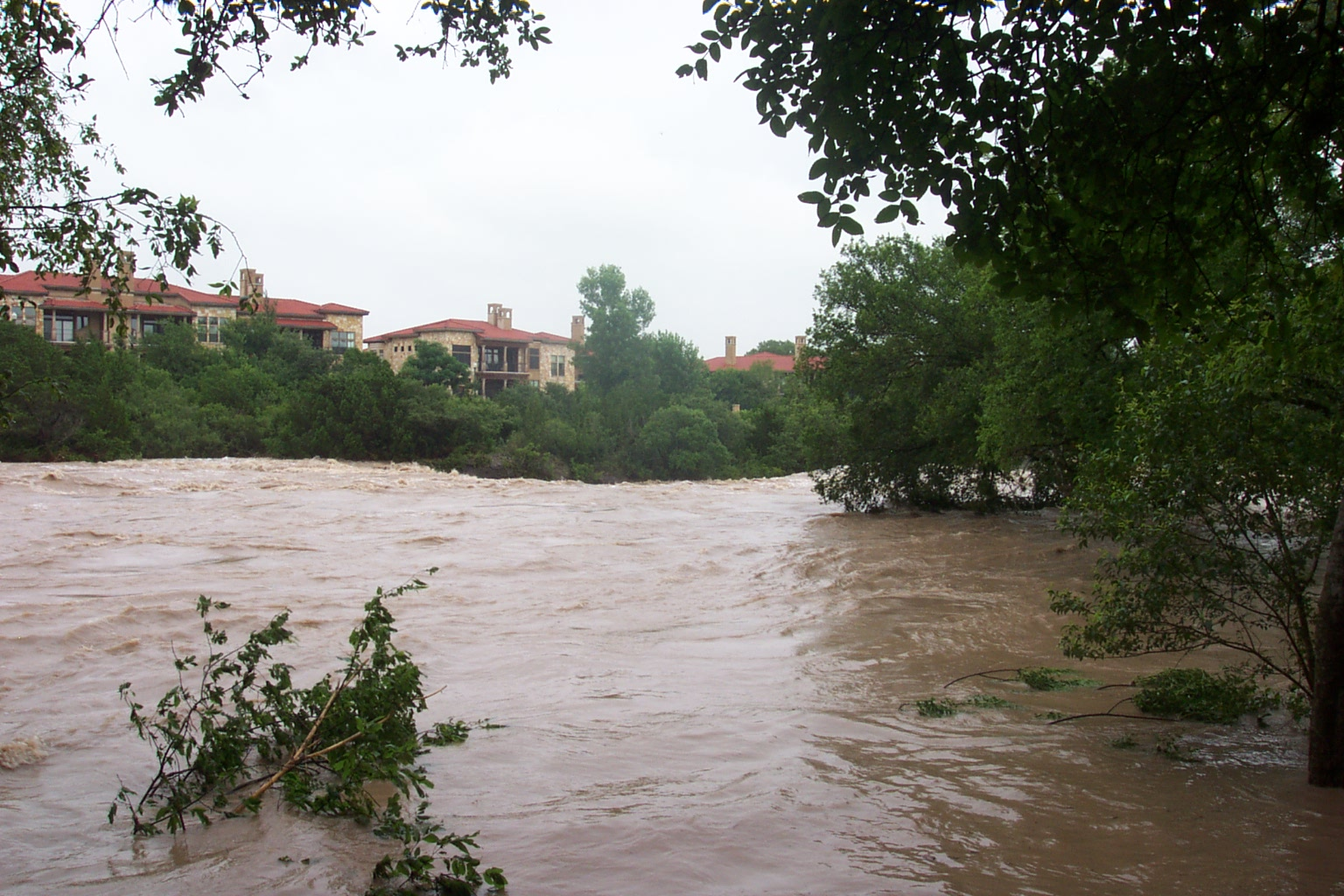
- Flood of summer 2007
- Map of San Gabriel River (red), North Fork San Gabriel River (purple) and South Fork San Gabriel River (blue) and Russell Fork San Gabriel River (black)

Location
- Country: United States

Physical characteristics
- Source
  - location: Confluence of North Fork and South Fork San Gabriel (Burnet County, Texas)
- Mouth
  - location: Brazos River, Texas

The San Gabriel River is a river that flows through central Texas, United States. The San Gabriel River is formed in Georgetown by the confluence of the North Fork San Gabriel and the South Fork San Gabriel, both of which originate in Burnet County. There are two major impoundments of the river: Lake Georgetown along the North Fork, and Granger Lake, about 25 miles (40 km) below the confluence. Both are U.S. Army Corps of Engineers impoundments. The San Gabriel River joins the Little River five miles south of Cameron which then meets the Brazos River northwest of College Station. There is a city park in Georgetown at the confluence of the North and South Forks, with a well-known local swimming spot (the "Blue Hole") located just upriver from the confluence on the South Fork.

Like most Texas Hill Country rivers, the San Gabriel west of the Balcones Fault is characterized by limestone river bottoms, some moderate rapids, small canyons, and muddy bottoms along slower-moving stretches; east of the Balcones Fault, the San Gabriel flows through the Blackland Prairie where rock features at the surface are more rare and the deep, clay soils are rolling to level and support dryland farms and more lush pastures than the thin soils to the west. Given the past tendency toward periodic large-scale but short-lived floods before construction of the large impoundments, much of the bottomland along the river banks east of Georgetown is forested with a mix of native oak and pecan plus other varieties, though in some locations pecan orchards with grafted varieties have been established as commercial enterprises. Two dams within the river forms Lake Georgetown and Granger Lake.

Recreational activities include canoeing, kayaking and fishing. Typical fish species found in the river are catfish, largemouth bass, sunfish, carp, longnose gar and various species of bait fish. However, many game fish and introduced species are found in the impoundments at Lake Georgetown and Granger Lake. The river runs through the Apache Pass Amphitheater and Festival Grounds near Thorndale, south of the town of San Gabriel. Apache Pass features a cantilevered stage that projects out over the river and is used for major concerts and other events.

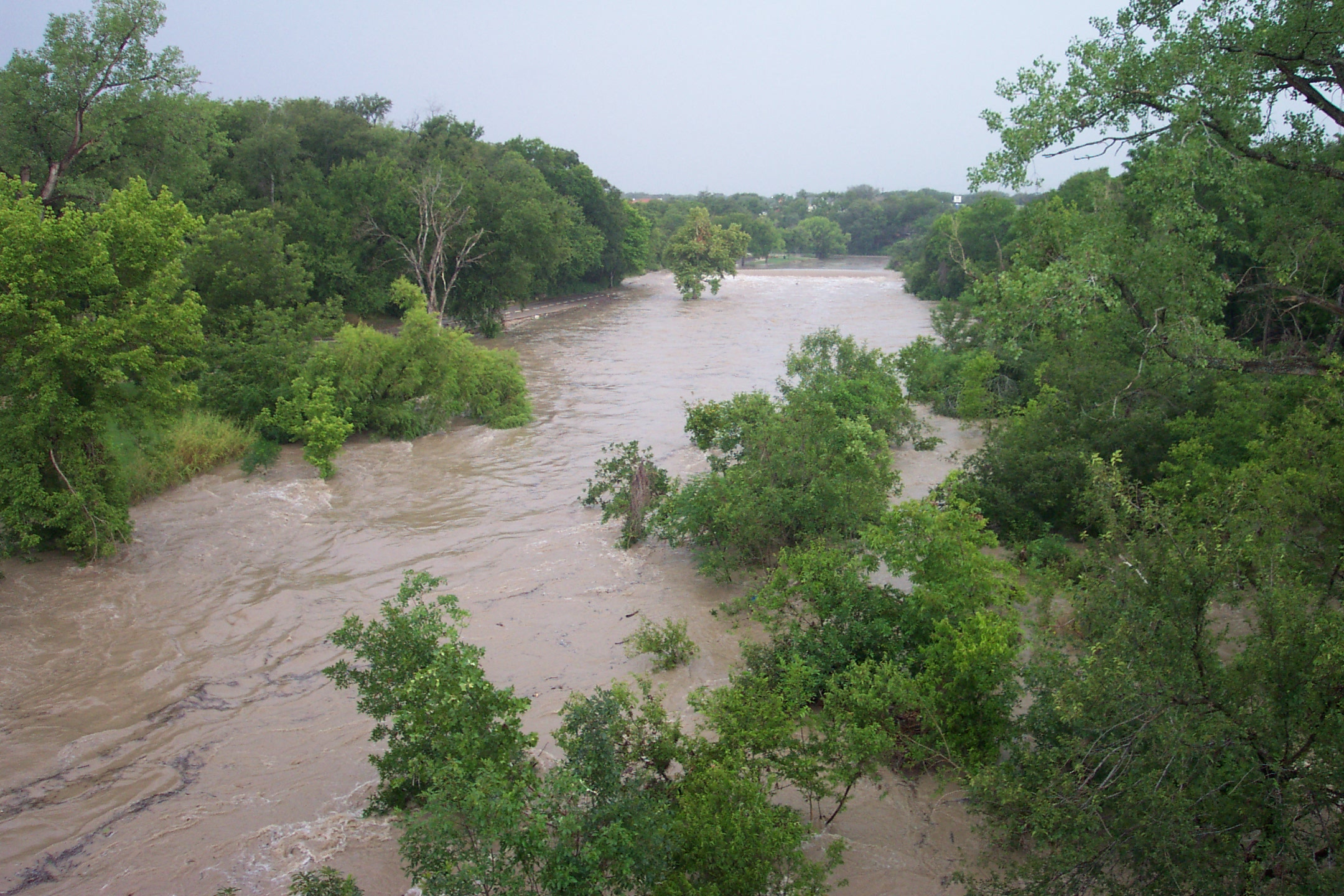
South Fork San Gabriel spilling over the dam at Blue Hole Park, 4 July 2002

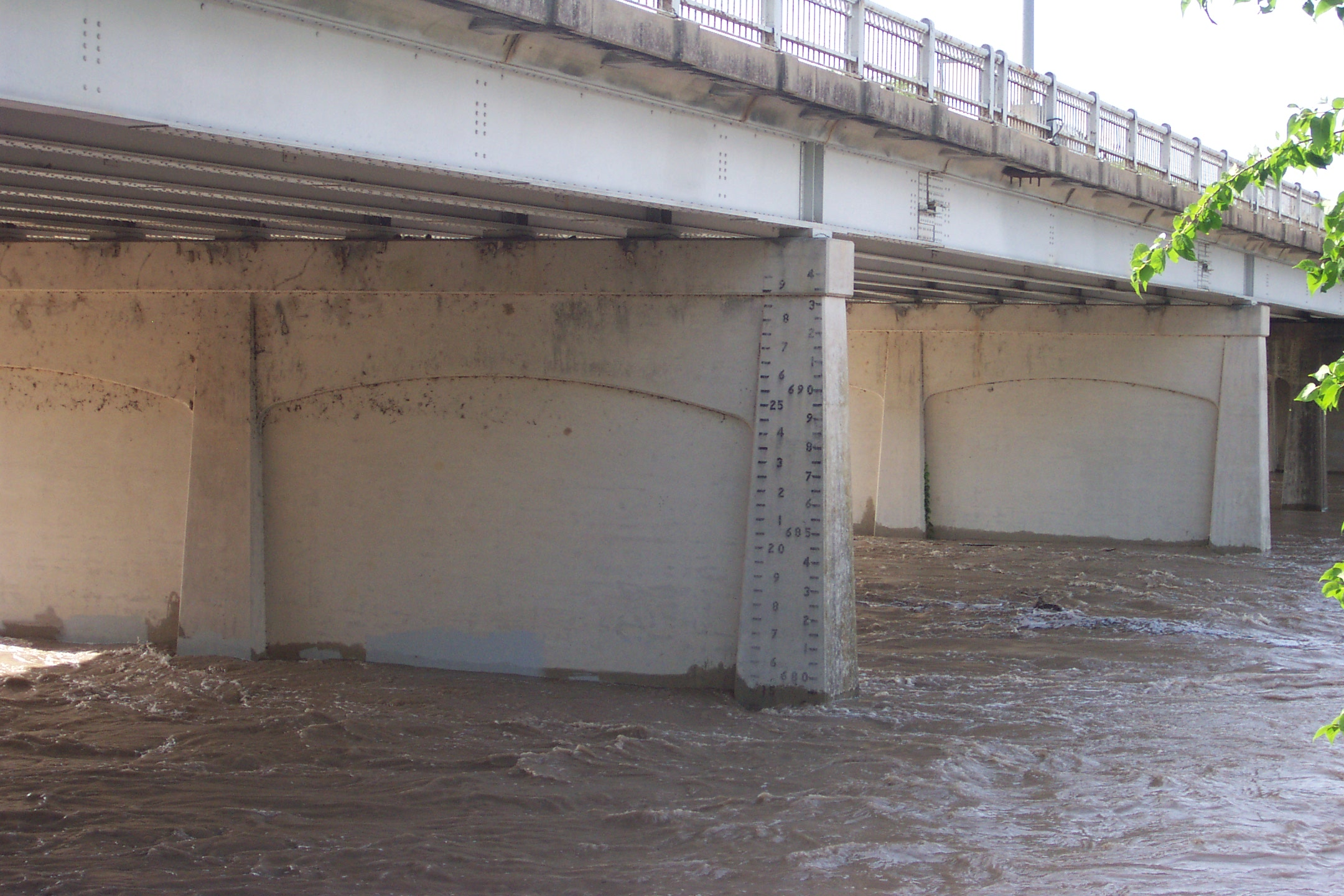
N. Austin Avenue bridge with river at 15 feet. 25-foot high-water mark is from November 2001 flooding.

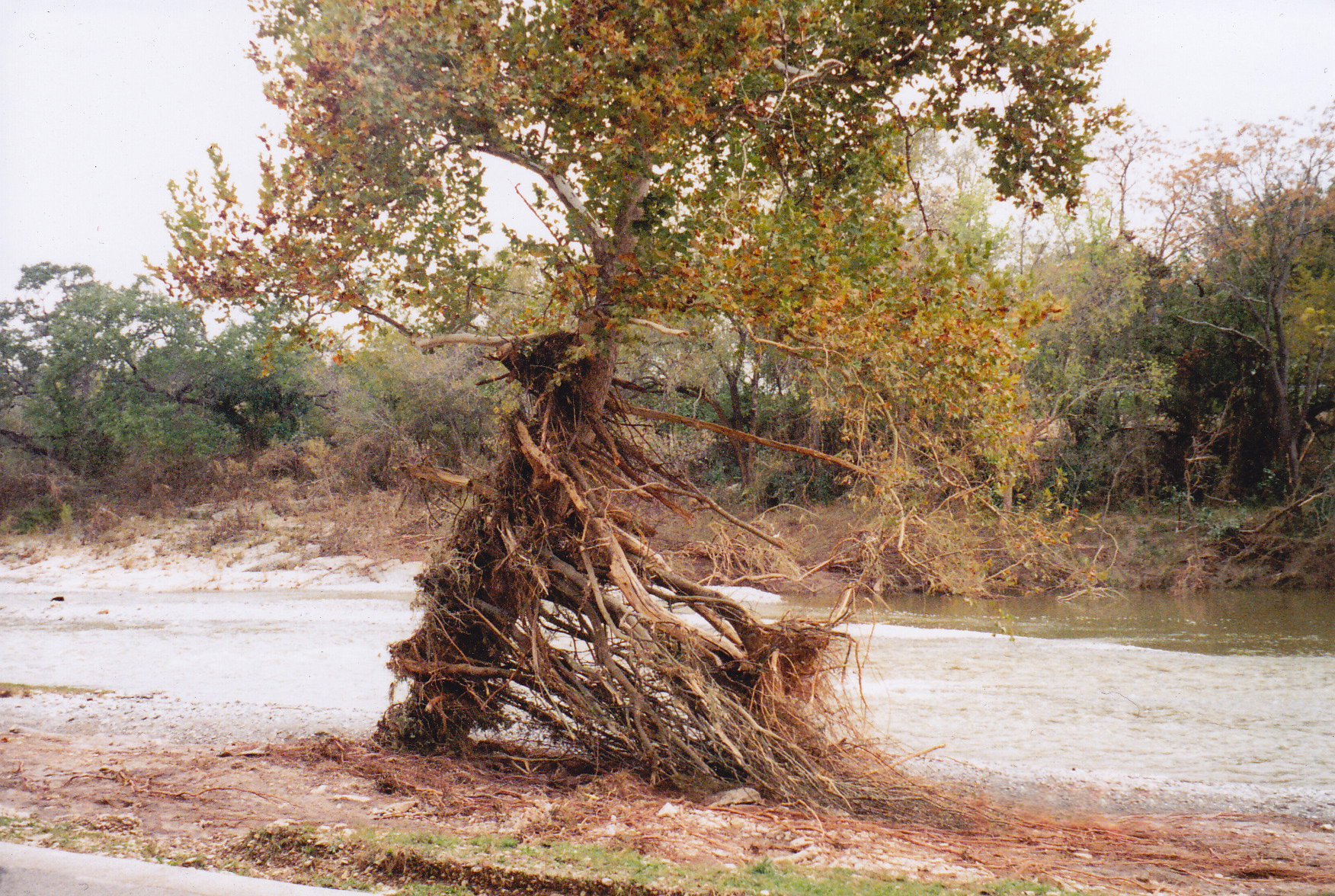
Flood damage in Blue Hole Park Nov 2001

== See also ==
- List of rivers of Texas
