= Über Goober =

- Directed by: Steve Metze
- Produced by: Steve Metze
- Starring: Gary Gygax; Peter Adkison
- Cinematography: Don Swaynos
- Edited by: David Hobizal
- Music by: Pat Murray
- Release date: July 21, 2004
- Running time: 87 minutes
- Country: United States
- Language: English

Über Goober A Film About Gamers is a 2004 independent documentary film focusing on people who play role-playing games.The film was released in 2004 and has a runtime of 87 minutes. The film was directed by Steve Metze and features interviews with Gary Gygax, Peter Adkison, Mike Stackpole and Bob Larson, amongst others. The film has screened at theatres, film festivals, and gaming conventions, winning the award for "Best Film" at Gen Con Indianapolis, 2004.

== Reviews ==
- Pyramid
