= Pflugerville (disambiguation) =

Pflugerville may refer to:

- Pflugerville, Texas, a city in Travis County, Texas, United States
- Lake Pflugerville, a reservoir in Pflugerville, Texas
- Pflugerville High School, a public high school located in Pflugerville, Texas
- Pflugerville Independent School District (PfISD), a public school district based in Pflugerville, Texas
- Pflugerville Solar Farm, proposed solar photovoltaic power plant near Pflugerville, Texas

== See also ==
- Pflüger
- Pflueger
