= Pflüger =

Pflüger is a German occupational surname meaning plowman or tillerman. Spelling variations of this family name include: Pfluger, Pflueger, Fluger, Pleumann, and Plemmons, among others.

Notable people with the surname include:

- August Pfluger (born 1978), American military officer and politician
- Eduard Friedrich Wilhelm Pflüger (1829–1910), German physiologist
- Friedbert Pflüger (born 1955), German politician
- Tobias Pflüger (born 1965), German politician

== See also ==
- Plowman
- Pflueger
- Pflugerville, Texas, city, United States
