= Pflueger =

Pflueger is a surname variant based on Pflüger, a German occupational surname meaning plowman or tillerman. Spelling variations of this family name include: Pfluger, Fluger, Pleumann, and Plemmons, among others.

Notable people with the surname include:

- Donald H. Pflueger (1923–1994), American historian, educator, and author
- Timothy L. Pflueger (1892–1946), American architect and interior designer
- Sandy Pflueger (born 1954), American equestrienne

== See also ==
- Plowman
- Pflüger
- Pflugerville, Texas, city, United States
