= Typhoon Texas =

Water parks in Texas

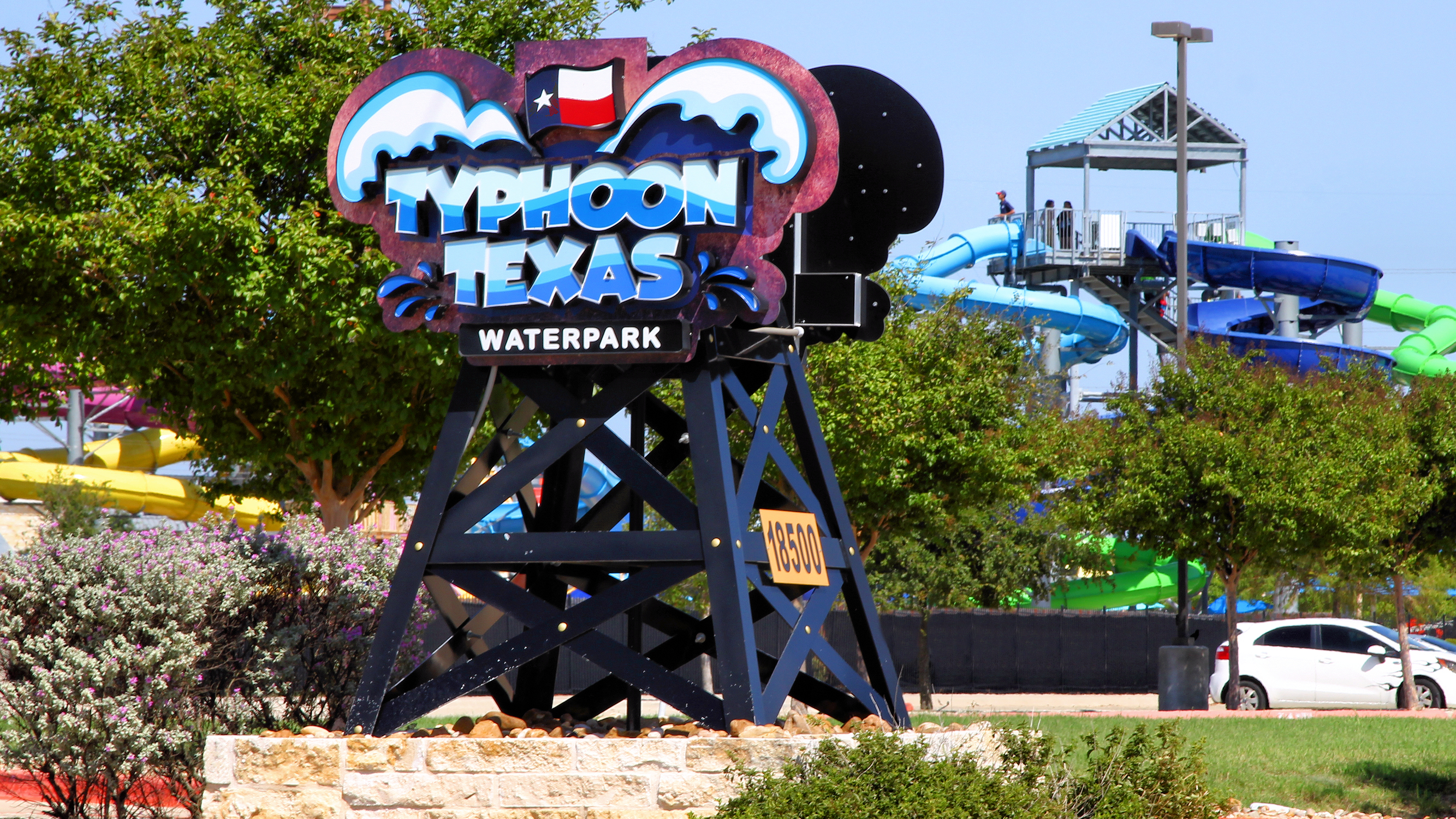
Entrance to Typhoon Texas Waterpark Austin

Typhoon Texas is a series of water parks in Texas. The company currently operates two locations in Austin and in Katy.

== Typhoon Texas Houston ==
Typhoon Texas Houston is a 25 acres (10 ha) water park is located next to Katy Mills in Katy, Texas. Construction began in 2015 and the park opened Memorial Day Weekend in 2016. It hosts 16 total rides. Includes snack bars and seasonal unlimited drink passes. The location recently built a smaller more kid-friendly section known as "Typhoon Jr" the park operates during the summer.

== Typhoon Texas Austin ==
Typhoon Texas Austin is located in Pflugerville, Texas. The park was part of the Hawaiian Falls water park chain from 2014-2016. The Park covers 25 acres (10 ha) of land, a majority of which is parking lots, and includes zip lines and rope courses (although these have been closed for years). It reopened with its current name in 2017.
