= Plowright =

Plowright is an occupational surname based on plowwright, a maker of plows.

- Charles Bagge Plowright (1849–1910), British doctor and mycologist
- David Plowright (1930–2006), English television executive and producer
- Hilda Plowright (1890–1973), English actress
- Joan Plowright (1929–2025), English actress
- John Plowright Houfton (1857–1929), British colliery owner and politician
- Jonathan Plowright (born 1959), British concert pianist
- Louise Plowright (1956–2016), British actress
- Misty Plowright (born 1983), American politician
- Piers Plowright (1937-2021), British radio producer
- Rosalind Plowright (born 1949), English opera singer
- Walter Plowright (1923–2010), English veterinary scientist

== See also ==
- Plowright Theatre, in Scunthorpe, North Lincolnshire named after Joan Plowright
- Plowman (surname)
