= Stanford Routt =

American football player (born 1983)

Stan Routt
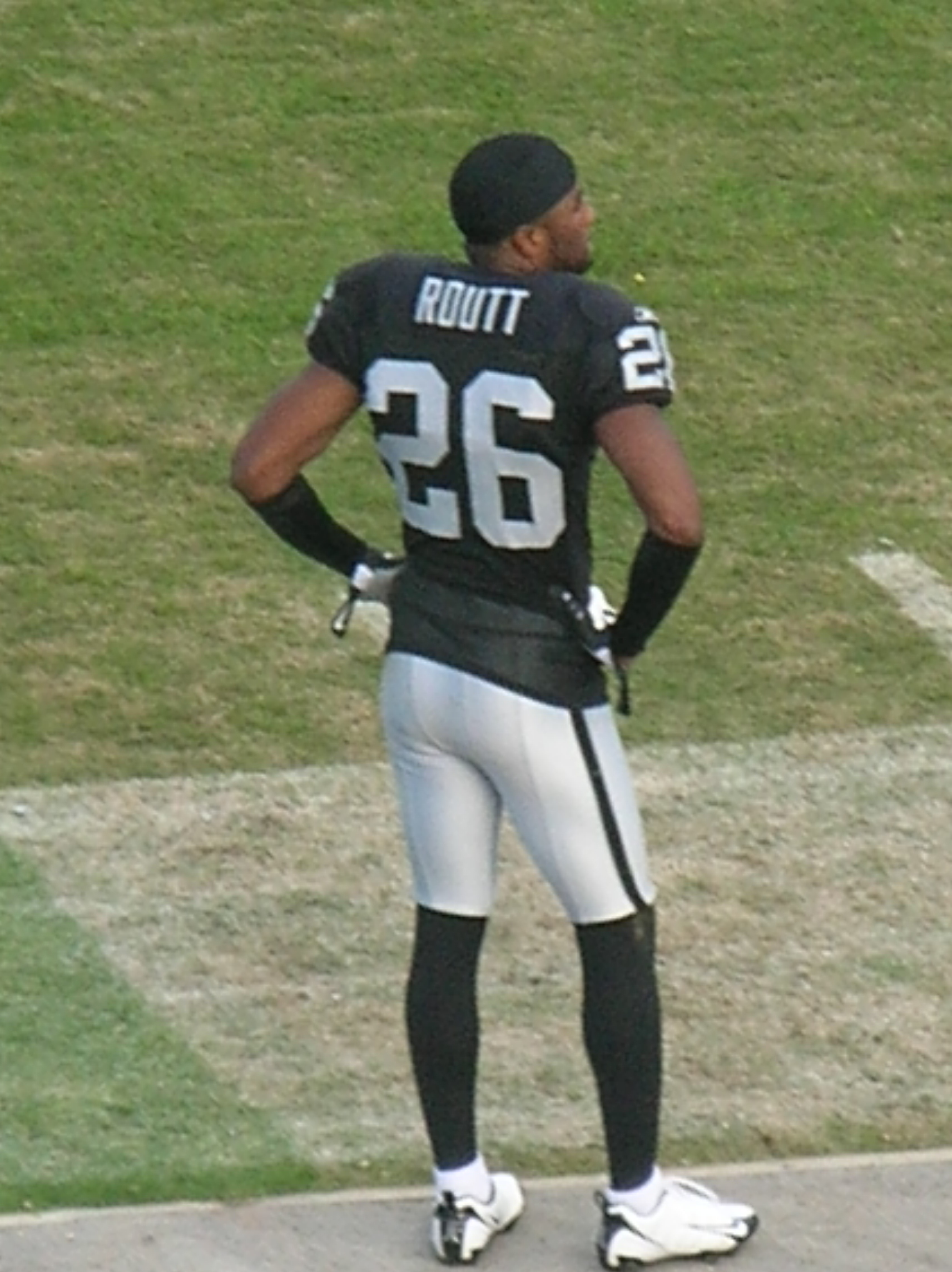
- Routt with the Oakland Raiders in 2008

No. 26, 30, 28
- Position: Cornerback

Personal information
- Born: July 26, 1983 (age 43); Austin, Texas, U.S.
- Listed height: 6 ft 1 in (1.85 m)
- Listed weight: 195 lb (88 kg)

Career information
- High school: Connally (Austin)
- College: Houston (2001–2004)
- NFL draft: 2005: 2nd round, 38th overall pick

Career history
- Oakland Raiders (2005–2011); Kansas City Chiefs (2012); Houston Texans (2012)

Career NFL statistics
- Total tackles: 258
- Sacks: 2
- Forced fumbles: 2
- Pass deflections: 55
- Interceptions: 12
- Defensive touchdowns: 1
- Stats at Pro Football Reference

Stanford Bermond Routt (born July 26, 1983) is an American former professional football player who was a cornerback in the National Football League (NFL). After playing college football for the Houston Cougars, he was selected by the Oakland Raiders in the second round of the 2005 NFL draft. He played for the Raiders for seven seasons from 2005 to 2011. He also played for the Kansas City Chiefs and Houston Texans.

== Early life ==
Routt attended John B. Connally High School in Austin, Texas, and was a two-sport standout in both football and track. In track, he was a unanimous All-District selection, as well as an All-America selection, and was also a state qualifier in both the 200 meter dash and the 4 × 400 metres relay team. As a junior, he ran the ninth-fastest 200-meter dash in the nation.

== College career ==
At the University of Houston, Routt excelled in indoor track and outdoor track as well as football. Routt eventually returned to University of Houston where he earned his Bachelor of Science degree in kinesiology with a concentration in sports administration in 2011.

=== Track and field ===
Stanford Routt earned NCAA Outdoor All-America honors after placing third in the 200 meters at the 2003 NCAA Outdoor Track Meet. Routt was named the Indoor Track Athlete of the Year by Conference USA in 2004 after winning the 60-meter and 200-meter dashes. Those wins eventually qualified Routt to compete in the 60-meter and 200-meter dashes at the NCAA Indoor Championship. Routt is a two-time champion in the 200 meters at the NCAA Midwest Regional Championships.

Personal bests

Event	Time (seconds)	Venue	Date
60 meters	6.65	Houston, Texas	February 7, 2004
100 meters	10.37	Houston, Texas	June 30, 2004
200 meters	20.03	College Station, Texas	May 29, 2004

== Professional career ==
=== Pre-draft ===
At the 2005 NFL Scouting Combine, Routt ran the fastest 40-yard dash at a time of 4.27 seconds, the fastest time since the NFL used electronic timing. His record was broken by running back Chris Johnson with a time of 4.24 seconds in 2008.

Pre-draft measurables
Height	Weight	Arm length	Hand span	40-yard dash	10-yard split	20-yard split	20-yard shuttle	Three-cone drill	Vertical jump	Broad jump
6 ft 1 3/8 in (1.86 m)	193 lb (88 kg)	32 in (0.81 m)	9 1/4 in (0.23 m)	4.27 s	1.57 s	2.60 s	3.90 s	6.63 s	36.5 in (0.93 m)	10 ft 9 in (3.28 m)
All values from NFL Combine

=== Oakland Raiders ===
Routt was selected by the Oakland Raiders in the second round (38th overall) of the 2005 NFL draft.

After limited action the first two weeks of the 2007 season due to a knee injury, Routt started the remainder of the season as the second cornerback alongside Nnamdi Asomugha.

Routt re-entered the starting lineup in 2010 after being tendered at the highest level (1st and 3rd round level) by the Raiders as a restricted free agent in the offseason. He had his best statistical year to date with 55 tackles, one tackle-for-loss, 15 pass deflections, one forced fumble, two interceptions, and one touchdown. In week 17, Routt recorded his second interception on the season for his first career touchdown. He had the second-lowest "burn rate" of all cornerbacks in 2010, with only 39.4% of passes completed that were thrown to receivers he covered.

The Raiders re-signed Routt to a three-year, $31.5 million contract on February 24, 2011, to remain in Oakland. The contract included a guaranteed $20 million over the first two years. Routt agreed to restructure his contract to aid the team's salary cap on August 4.

Following the 2011 season in which Routt started 15 games and recorded four interceptions, the Raiders released him on February 9, 2012.

=== Kansas City Chiefs ===
Routt signed a three-year, $19.6 million contract with the Kansas City Chiefs on February 20, 2012. On November 5, 2012, Routt was released by the Chiefs.

=== Houston Texans ===
On December 4, 2012, Routt had a workout with the Houston Texans. Routt signed with the team on the same day.

=== NFL statistics ===
Year	Team	GP	COMB	TOTAL	AST	SACK	FF	FR	FR YDS	INT	IR YDS	AVG IR	LNG	TD	PD
2005	OAK	15	24	22	2	1.0	0	0	0	0	0	0	0	0	2
2006	OAK	16	22	22	0	0.0	0	0	0	1	6	6	6	0	2
2007	OAK	16	42	35	7	0.0	0	0	0	3	31	10	31	0	7
2008	OAK	15	16	13	3	0.0	0	0	0	0	0	0	0	0	5
2009	OAK	16	29	23	6	1.0	0	0	0	0	0	0	0	0	7
2010	OAK	16	55	49	6	0.0	1	0	0	2	22	11	22	1	13
2011	OAK	16	49	42	7	0.0	0	0	0	4	7	2	3	0	15
2012	KC-HOU	9	21	19	2	0.0	1	0	0	2	49	25	32	0	4
Career		117	258	225	33	2.0	2	0	0	12	115	10	32	1	55
