= Spring Creek Forest Preserve =

Nature reserve in Dallas, Texas

Coordinates: 32°57′49.42″N 96°39′13.59″W

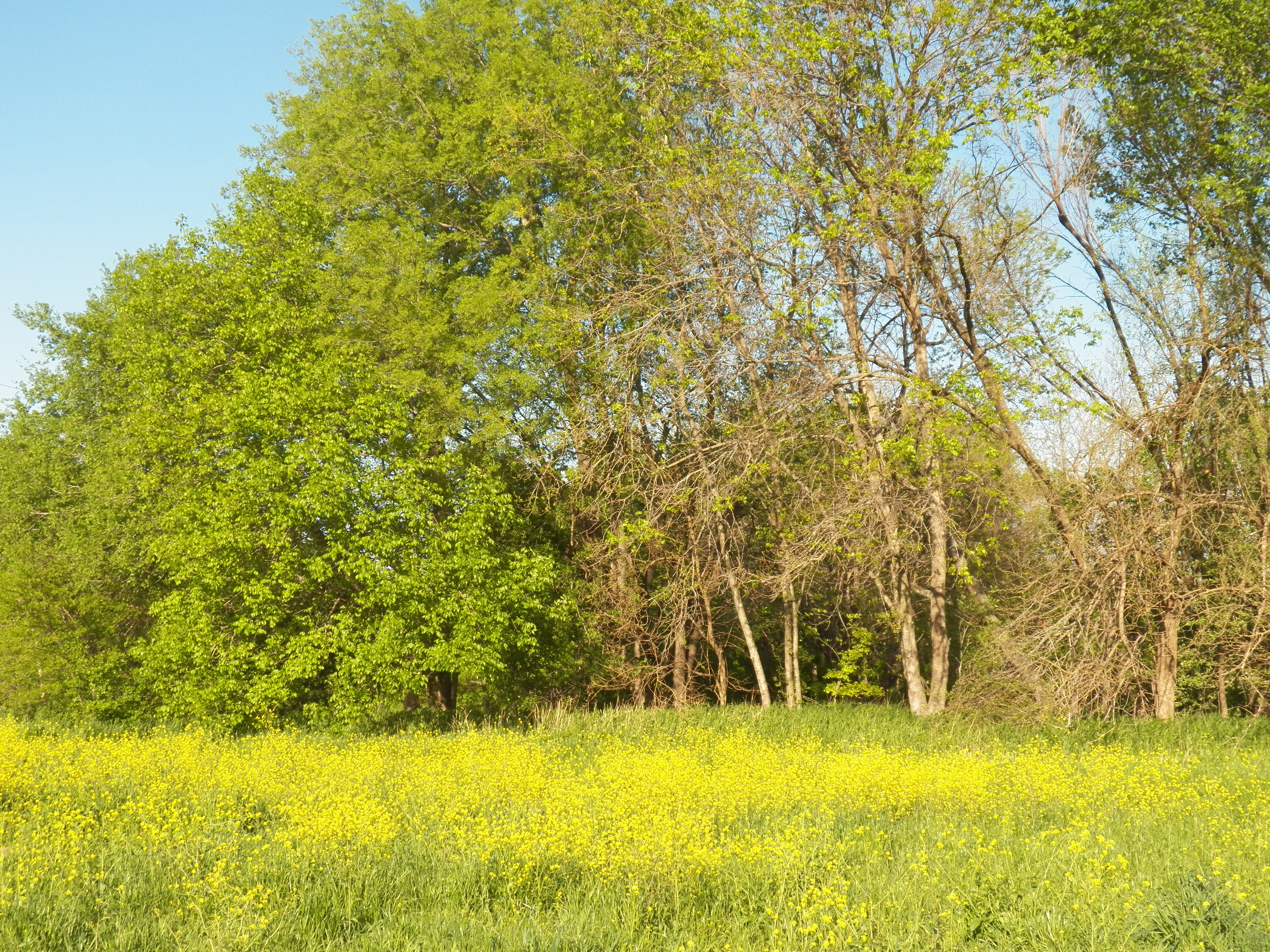
Spring Creek Forest Preserve

The Spring Creek Forest Preserve is a city-owned nature preserve located in Garland, a suburb of Dallas, Texas.

== History ==
In 1978, Bobby C. Scott, a self-taught botanist, recognized some plants in a section of woods in Garland, Texas as indicators of virgin forest. The existence of virgin forest within city limits is highly unusual, as the 19th Century settlers in the area typically cut down the forests for use in construction or to clear land for farming. For the next decade, Mr. Scott fought for the preservation of this area, known as the Spring Creek Forest, named for the primary creek running through it. He and Dallas naturalist Edward C. "Ned" Fritz worked together to present a case to the City of Garland and Dallas County for preservation. The pair brought in academic and government botanists, who confirmed the unique nature of the Forest, and identified several rare and unique plants. In 1988, Dallas County and the State of Texas purchased 69 acres (28 ha) of the land to set aside as the Spring Creek Forest Preserve. The land was given to Garland for maintenance. Since 1987, the City of Garland and the Preservation Society for Spring Creek Forest are responsible for maintaining the nature trails within the Preserve.

== Landscape ==
The preserve is situated in northern Dallas County, and features old-growth bottomland forest with a gentle, wide spring water stream that flows over a bed of solid limestone. The force of the water has cut cliffs from the surrounding Austin Chalk. The towering 20- to 40-foot-tall (6 to 12 m) cliffs contain Cretaceous fossils dated at 87 million years old, a combination primarily found only in Garland. Austin Chalk is also found in the eastern portion of the DFW Metroplex heading toward the Texas Hill Country. Several geologic formations are interspersed along the last five miles (8.0 km) of the creek located in Garland and Richardson. The entire length of the creek, named Spring Creek, is spring fed at a constant 72 °F (22 °C). The swift water of Spring Creek varies in depth between one and six feet (0.3 meter - 2 meter) and is about 20 feet (6.1 meters) wide. Even in years of extreme drought, it has never run dry. The water clarity allows one to watch the native Longear Sunfish, which can be seen gliding along against the white, limestone bottom. The abundant water supply has allowed the forest to survive for centuries. Some of the trees in the forest are as much as 500 years old and tower 100 feet (30 meters) on trunks that are 4 feet (1.2 meters) in diameter. Five varieties of oak live in the forest, including chinquapin, bur, and shumard, a combination found nowhere else in the world. Native plants include the solomon's seal, horsetails and Pennsylvania violet (Viola pennsylvanicum). More than 630 species of plants and animals have been observed in addition to the many species of dragonflies, spiders, mites, beetles, fungi, and ants living in the forest.

== Preservation ==
The densely shaded preserve has been improved with miles of earthen trail and a short quarter mile section of concrete trail leading from the paved parking lot to the water's edge. The land won preservation status due to its unique old growth trees and endangered species. The preserve website contains thousands of photographs of the landscape, flowers, wildlife and water. In keeping with the goals of the preservation society, the forest is kept as natural as possible so that visitors can step back in time and experience life as it was before the area was settled by the Peter's Colony in 1846. Every February, nature walks are held by the society to celebrate the blooming of the trout lily (dogtooth-violet), a wildflower that is considered the harbinger of Spring for locals. The annual walks attract about 30 to 50 outdoors people each year.

While this pristine, clear water creek runs through the solid limestone of three cities, only two parcels of land abutting the creek have been given preservation status. These are the Spring Creek Forest Preserve, owned by the city of Garland; and the Dallas County Park Preserve, owned by Dallas County Parks and Open Spaces. Both preserves are across the street from each other on Holford Road. The majority of Spring Creek has been land locked by private housing developments and commercial office buildings along its entire ten-mile length for decades. These two parks are all that is left of the land once inhabited by tribes of the Caddo nation.

The total preservation area contains two sections. The Lee F. Jackson Spring Creek Forest Preserve, where official tours are held at 1770 Holford Rd., contains approximately 83 acres (34 ha). The Dallas County Park Preserve located on the opposite side of the bridge at 1787 Holford Rd., contains 33 acres (13 ha). The Preserve is maintained and managed by the Spring Creek Forest Preservation Society a not-for-profit organization formed in 1987 to oversee the park under the direction of the Garland Parks and Recreation Department as provided under its contract with Dallas County. The all volunteer Society holds monthly meetings from September through May with a monthly volunteer work day held on Saturdays. For times and locations of the meetings, please see the organization calendar at

The land was originally purchased from private land owners through a Dallas County Bond Election. The primary land owner was Ann C. Weary, an internationally know artist who sketched the trees in intricate detail.

== Future ==
Today, there exists a great quantity of undeveloped acreage, which could be preserved, on both publicly and privately owned land. Due to the lack of county funding, current private landowners will most likely sell their land to commercial developers. The city has allocated most of its park funding toward the construction of playgrounds and soccer fields, some built directly along the banks of the stream. The destruction of this area began to escalate with the completion of the 190 Bush Tollway, which passes directly over Spring Creek. Official development of the area has been in the active planning stages for at least the last decade. The most recent major projects have been the completion of the nearby Firewheel Golf Course and the newly developed Firewheel Town Center, a.k.a., shopping mall. The area is slated to become a major tourist attraction for corporate travelers due to its proximity to Richardson's Telecom Corridor. The middle waters of Spring Creek flow in the shadows of the Owen's Sausage farm/processing plant and several computer technology skyscrapers. Walmart and Sam's Club were built within hundreds of feet of the preserve with little protest from the citizenry. The headwaters literally flow under Collin Creek Mall in Plano.

As with any major commercial development, the value of the few remaining parcels along Spring Creek have begun to skyrocket. City officials admit that the city is now officially landlocked since it is also surrounded on all sides by other suburbs. This means that the remaining ecologically sensitive area located on private lands is in danger of developmental destruction. The only way for the remaining natural limestone outcroppings, dramatic elevations and large colonies of Trout Lilies to be preserved, is for a philanthropist to come forward and purchase land for preservation. While it was hoped by many citizens for many years that the county would purchase the land, or in the least that the city Planning and Zoning Commission would only approve environmentally related businesses, it is now apparent that this is not the case. The City Council has directed the commission to approve any and all development projects under the same regulations required for all commercial businesses in the neighboring hotel, restaurant, and housing development zone.
