= Community Impact =

Newspaper

- Type: Monthly
- Format: Full-color stapled newspaper
- Owner(s): Community Impact Newspaper Company (JG Media, Inc. (John P. Garrett & Jennifer Garrett))
- Publisher: Jaselle Luna, Jason Culpepper, Leanne Libby, Traci Rodriguez, Travis Baker
- Managing editor: Billy Wadsack, Kelly Schafler, Matt Stephens, Miranda Jaimes
- Content Editor: Marie Leonard
- Founded: 2005
- Language: English
- Headquarters: 16225 Impact Way; Pflugerville, TX 78660
- Circulation: 2.5 million
- Website: communityimpact.com
- Free online archives: communityimpact.com/print-archives/

Community Impact is a news organization founded and privately owned by John and Jennifer Garrett, who respectively serve as its current Chief Executive Officer and Chief Facility Management Officer. Its products include monthly newspapers delivered through USPS mail and daily email newsletters to opt-in inboxes. As of 2023, it delivers to over 35 markets, covering 2.5 million mailboxes in the Austin, Dallas-Fort Worth, Houston and San Antonio metros.

== History ==
In September 2005, Community Impact Newspaper launched its first edition in Round Rock and Pflugerville, Texas. Six employees created the first newspaper in the game room of John and Jennifer Garrett's house. Garrett was a former Advertising Director of the Austin Business Journal.

In its first five years, Community Impact Newspaper added about 60 employees and launched 10 community newspapers, including an expansion to the Houston metro in September 2009. In 2010, in a period of heavy layoffs at newspapers and throughout the legacy media industry, Community Impact Newspaper experienced growth, branding the idea that "Print Ain't Dead." After expanding into the Dallas–Fort Worth metro area in March 2011, the media company was featured by Editor & Publisher, CISION and CultureMap Austin.

From 2011-2016, Community Impact Newspaper was named to Inc. Magazine's top 5000 fastest-growing companies for seven consecutive years.

In late 2012, Community Impact Newspaper announced plans to build a new $2.5 million headquarters in Pflugerville, TX, and the 16,000-square-foot office was completed in December 2013. John Garrett was featured in Forbes shortly after the announcement.

In June 2015, Community Impact Newspaper announced it would build a $10 million printing facility next to its headquarters to begin printing all newspaper editions starting in 2016. Since then Community Impact Printing has added on outside printing customers throughout the U.S.

In 2018, Community Impact Newspaper announced its first launch outside of Texas into Phoenix, Arizona, debuting in Gilbert and from there growing into Chandler. In 2019, Community Impact Newspaper launched in the Franklin & Brentwood communities outside of Nashville, Tennessee.

Early March 2020, Community Impact Newspaper launched in the Alpharetta & Milton communities outside of Atlanta, Georgia. However, due to the COVID-19 pandemic, the market closed soon after.

In 2022, Community Impact Newspaper decided to focus solely on Texas as the 9th largest economy in the world, rebranding as Community Impact. They removed “newspaper” from their name, changed their logo and updated their mission statement as a symbol of their “flywheel” strategy, which aims to develop digital products on par with print and recognize the significance of both for readers. That same year, Community Impact started building a Houston Headquarters office in the Jersey Village community, with all staff celebrating the move in at an open house the next April.

As of 2023, the company employs 200 “Impacters” and has won many industry awards, with leadership often serving as event presenters and moderators. In April 2023, Texas Monthly did a feature profile on John Garrett and Community Impact, giving details on the thriving business given the struggling print and news industries.

== Markets ==
As of 2026 the following markets are being served with various individual editions:

- Austin metro area including Travis County, Williamson County, Hays County and Comal County
- Houston metro area including Brazoria County, Harris County, Fort Bend County, Montgomery County and Galveston County
- Dallas Fort Worth Metroplex including Tarrant County, Collin County, Denton County and Dallas County

The newspaper is mailed to all households and businesses in the given area assuring widespread circulation. It is a non-subscription based newspaper and comes free in the mail each month. However, subscriptions are available for those outside of the circulation area.
