= Greg Golson =

American baseball player (born 1985)

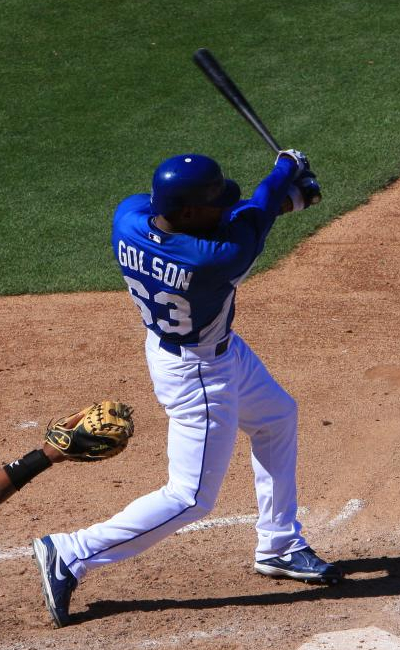
- Golson with the Kansas City Royals in 2012 spring training
- Outfielder
- Born: September 17, 1985 (age 40); Austin, Texas, U.S.
- Batted: Right Threw: Right

MLB debut
- September 3, 2008, for the Philadelphia Phillies

Last MLB appearance
- September 28, 2011, for the New York Yankees

MLB statistics
- Batting average: .195
- Home runs: 0
- Runs batted in: 2
- Stats at Baseball Reference

Teams
- Philadelphia Phillies (2008); Texas Rangers (2009); New York Yankees (2010–2011)

Gregory Joseph Golson (born September 17, 1985) is an American former professional baseball outfielder. A first round selection (21st overall) in the 2004 Major League Baseball draft by the Philadelphia Phillies, Golson played in Major League Baseball (MLB) for the Phillies (2008), Texas Rangers (2009), and New York Yankees (2010–2011).

== Amateur career ==
Golson attended John B. Connally High School in Austin, Texas. He committed to the University of Texas. Baseball America ranked him as the 29th best player (and 11th best high school player) in the 2004 MLB Draft. Golson was named to USA Today's All-USA High School Baseball Team alongside future MLB stars like Homer Bailey, Justin Upton, Neil Walker, and Trevor Plouffe.

In 2015, Golson's former high school retired #15, his former uniform number from when he played.

== Professional career ==
=== Philadelphia Phillies ===
The Philadelphia Phillies selected Golson with the 21st overall pick in the first round of the 2004 Major League Baseball draft. After drafting him, the Phillies assigned Golson to their Gulf Coast League affiliate in rookie ball. He hit .295 with eight doubles, five triples, and 12 stolen bases in 47 games. After the season, Baseball America ranked him as the fourth-best prospect in the Phillies system.

Golson's speed became a feature of his game, and went on to steal over 100 bases in five minor-league seasons. In a 2008 interview, Golson said, regarding his success as a base-stealer, that "[you've] got to be real observant of what the pitcher is doing, if they fall into patterns, what the catcher is doing, the counts, the game situation—stuff like that ... but speed is the big thing".

In 2007, his second minor-league season, Golson was promoted to the A-level Lakewood BlueClaws in Lakewood, New Jersey. He continued to accumulate high strikeout numbers, with 106 in 375 at-bats, but he also posted a .264 average, hit 8 triples (a career-high), and stole 25 bases. After the 2005 season, Golson was named the third-best prospect in the Phillies' system by Baseball America, the highest spot he would reach in those rankings. He was also ranked as the 14th best prospect in the South Atlantic League.

Most of the 2006 season was spent at Lakewood as well, with a late-season promotion to the Clearwater Threshers. Between the two levels, Golson hit .233 and struck out 160 times. He hit 13 home runs and batted in 48 runs. Golson also accumulated 127 hits in 593 plate appearances. After the season, he was rated as the Phillies' 10th best prospect by Baseball America.

Strikeouts continued to plague Golson as he began the 2007 season. Between Clearwater and the Reading Phillies, Golson struck out 173 times in 607 plate appearances. He was a Florida State League All-Star that year and was promoted to Double-A in July. Golson hit a combined 15 home runs in 2007, with 32 doubles and 5 triples. His .273 average and .426 slugging percentage were a large improvement over the previous year. His prospect ranking dropped to seventh.

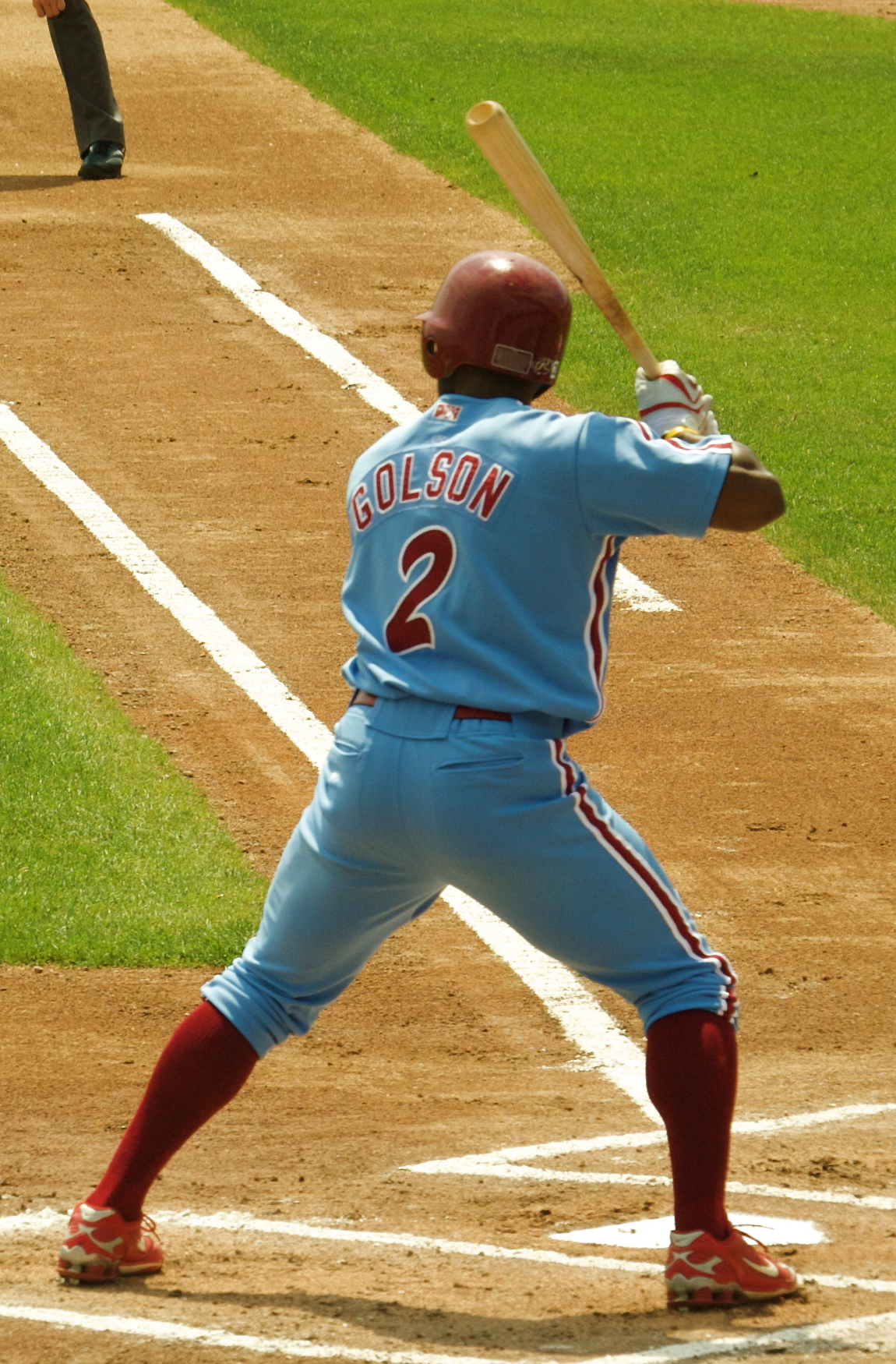
Golson batting for the Reading Phillies in 2008

Golson remained at Reading for the 2008 season. He was named an Eastern League All-Star and played in the All-Star Futures Game that year. After hitting .282 with 13 home runs, 18 doubles, and 23 stolen bases, Golson was called up by the Phillies on September 1. He made his debut on September 3, pinch-running for Pat Burrell. He made several appearances as a late-inning defensive replacement, which was fine with Golson. "You can really impact a game, where people will remember stuff … if you make a great catch that saves the game, people remember that for a long time." With the Phillies, Golson went 0-for-6 in six games, scoring two runs and stealing a base. He was not included on the postseason roster that year, instead being assigned to the team's Florida complex.

=== Texas Rangers ===
On November 20, 2008, Golson was traded by the Phillies to the Texas Rangers for John Mayberry, Jr. Phillies general manager Rubén Amaro, Jr. called the trade a "'speed-for-power' swap". Golson spent most of the season with the Oklahoma City RedHawks in Triple-A. He was called up on May 4, got one plate appearance, and was optioned again on May 9. In 146 plate appearances, Golson hit .289 with five doubles, three triples, six stolen bases, and 40 RBI with Oklahoma City.

=== New York Yankees ===
On January 26, 2010, Golson was traded to the New York Yankees in exchange for minor league player Mitch Hilligoss and cash, after being designated for assignment by the Texas Rangers a few days earlier. He was called up for the first time on May 4 and got his first major league hit on May 12 against the Detroit Tigers. After six appearances, he was sent back to Triple-A on May 18. Golson was recalled when roster expanded on September 1. Playing against the Tampa Bay Rays at Tropicana Field on September 14, Golson astonished players and spectators with a strong throw from right field to throw out the speedy Carl Crawford at third base for the final out of the game. Golson was included on the team's postseason roster.

He spent most of the 2011 season in Triple-A with the Scranton/Wilkes-Barre Yankees. He was briefly called up on July 14 when Alex Rodriguez went on the disabled list. Golson was again recalled when rosters expanded in September. He was released on December 8.

=== Kansas City Royals ===
The Kansas City Royals signed Golson to a minor league contract on December 13, 2011.

=== Chicago White Sox ===
The Royals traded Golson to the Chicago White Sox for cash considerations on March 25, 2012. Golson played in 2012 with Triple-A Charlotte, where he hit .276 with 6 HR, 52 RBI and 20 SB in 109 games.

=== Colorado Rockies ===
The Colorado Rockies signed Golson to a minor league contract on January 30, 2013. Golson began 2013 with Triple-A Colorado Springs. In 55 games with the Sky Sox, Golson hit .244 with 5 HR, 22 RBI and 12 SB. He was released on July 19.

=== Lancaster Barnstormers ===
On July 27, 2013, Golson signed with the Lancaster Barnstormers of the Atlantic League of Professional Baseball. He homered in his first at-bat.

=== Atlanta Braves ===
On July 31, 2013, Golson joined the Atlanta Braves on a minor league contract. He was assigned to Triple-A Gwinnett.

=== Milwaukee Brewers ===
Golson signed a minor league contract with the Milwaukee Brewers in January 2014. He was released in March.

=== Lancaster Barnstormers (second stint) ===
In 2014, he signed with the Lancaster Barnstormers and hit .312 with two homers and 20 RBI in 51 games. During the playoffs, he hit .273, homering twice and driving in nine runs, as the Barnstormers won the championship that year.

=== Rojos del Aguila de Veracruz ===
On April 28, 2015, Golson signed with Rojos del Aquila de Veracruz of the Mexican League for the 2015 season. In 22 games he hit .278/.323/.333 with 0 home runs, 8 RBIs and 8 stolen bases.

=== Tigres de Quintana Roo ===
On May 26, 2015, he was traded to Tigres de Quintana Roo for right fielder Ramon Ramirez. In 58 games he hit .335/.416/.457 with 2 home runs, 38 RBIs and 13 stolen bases.

=== New Britain Bees ===
On March 18, 2016, Golson returned to the Atlantic League when he signed a one-year deal with the New Britain Bees. In 96 games he hit .292/.338/.379 with 3 home runs, 38 RBIs and 18 stolen bases.

He was the team's first player with MLB experience. Golson re-signed with the New Britain Bees for the 2017 season but shortly after asked for his release to play in Mexico.

=== Tigres de Quintana Roo (second stint) ===
On April 10, 2017, Golson signed with the Tigres de Quintana Roo of the Mexican Baseball League. He was released on May 5, 2017. In 27 games he hit .260/.351/.300 with 0 home runs, 9 RBIs and 5 stolen bases.

=== Somerset Patriots ===
On May 26, 2017, Golson signed with the Somerset Patriots of the Atlantic League of Professional Baseball. He became a free agent following the season. In 43 games he hit .255/.290/.406 with 4 home runs, 26 RBIs and 4 stolen bases.

=== Wichita Wingnuts ===
On March 9, 2018, Golson signed with the Wichita Wingnuts of the American Association.

=== Texas AirHogs ===
He was traded to the Texas AirHogs on March 28, 2018. On October 8, Texas exercised its option to keep Golson for the 2019 season. He was released on March 5, 2019. In 43 games he hit .259/.318/.333 with 1 home run and 11 RBIs.

=== Lancaster Barnstormers (third stint) ===
On May 27, 2019, Golson signed with the Lancaster Barnstormers of the Atlantic League of Professional Baseball. In 54 games he hit .267/.309/.341 with 2 home runs, 16 RBIs and 3 stolen bases.

Golson retired following the 2019 season and later was hired by the Los Angeles Dodgers in their pro scouting department.
