= Weiss High School =

Location
- 5201 Wolf Pack Drive; Pflugerville, Texas 78660; United States; 30.429354°N 97.565589°W

Information
- Type: Public high school
- Motto: One Family - One Destiny.
- Established: 2017
- School district: Pflugerville Independent School District
- Principal: Ameka Hunt
- Staff: 130.29 (FTE)
- Grades: 9–12
- Enrollment: 2,068 (2025–2026)
- Student to teacher ratio: 15.27
- Campus type: Suburban, large
- Colors: Red and black
- Athletics conference: UIL Class 5A
- Mascot: Wolf
- Website: whs.pfisd.net

Weiss High School is a public high school located in Pflugerville, Texas. The school was named for the Weiss family, who moved to Pflugerville in 1875, just 26 years after Pflugerville was originally settled. Weiss High school opened its doors in 2017 and its first set of students graduated in 2020, its very first graduation was celebrated in the midst of the COVID-19 pandemic.

== Athletics ==
=== List of sports ===
- Baseball
- Basketball
- Football
- Golf
- Powerlifting
- Soccer
- Softball
- Swimming (sport)
- Tennis
- Track and field
- Volleyball
- Wrestling
- Cheer
- Cross Country

==== The Pfield ====
The 10,000 capacity flagship stadium was created through 2016–2017 and opened in the 2017–18 school year, but was also used for the preceding 4th of July. It is used for the whole district's varsity football games - by all 4 high schools in PfISD, but not all of Weiss' games, for which Weiss uses its own stadium.
