= Hawaiian Falls =

Water park franchise in Texas, United States

Hawaiian Falls Waterparks
- Industry: Water parks
- Founded: Garland, Texas; May 24, 2003 (23 years ago)
- Number of locations: 5
- Area served: Texas, United States
- Key people: Ryan Forson (Managing Director)
- Owner: Varies by park
- Parent: ProParks Management Company
- Website: http://www.hfalls.com

Hawaiian Falls Waterparks is a chain of waterparks operated by ProParks Management Company. The five locations Hawaiian Falls operates are located across the Dallas-Fort Worth metroplex area and Central Texas. All Hawaiian Falls parks are built using the public-private partnership model, where cities contribute funds and/or other incentives and the parks are built on public land. Each of the seven parks has a separate lease structure with the cities participation ranging from contributing land and infrastructure costs(Garland and The Colony)to 100% financing . The first two parks were in the city of Garland and the city of The Colony, both in Texas. The third park was located in the South Oak Cliff neighborhood of Dallas.

Busch sees his parks as a "mission field." The parks are often used for baptisms and other religious activities, and Busch says there were "more than 2,000 baptisms in our lazy rivers and wavepools" in 2011 alone. The parks often feature Christian concerts and events, such as "Modesty Matters" in 2013. Hawaiian Falls employee program is called "Connections." According to Rawd B. Jones, whose company Pure Group, administers Connections, the program includes after hours Bible study and church services, as well as training on how to bring the gospel to guests.

== History ==
=== 2002–2003 ===
The Hawaiian Falls chain began with the groundbreaking of Hawaiian Falls Adventure Park in Garland, Texas on December 18, 2002, by David Busch of Horizon Family Inc., a California-based company. Mr. Busch has built and operated other water park properties in several states, including the park located on the island of Oahu in Hawaii. Hawaiian Falls' mission is: "Serving the Lord by Bringing Families Closer Together." The City of Garland City Council and the Parks and Recreation Board provided the land on which the water park was built. Construction for Hawaiian Falls Garland began in January 2003 and opened in May of the same year. In late 2003 Hawaiian Falls made a similar agreement with The Colony, Texas. Also in 2003, Hawaiian Falls entered into a lease agreement with the city of Dallas to manage what would become Bahama Beach Waterpark.

=== 2004-2007 ===
In late 2004, Busch experienced financial problems and he had to sell his company to Herschend Family Entertainment. Under the Herschend management, Busch continued to operate the waterparks.

In 2005, the Dallas aquatic center opened as Bahama Beach Waterpark in Dallas, Texas under the management of Busch once again. Bahama Beach is known as "the first inner-city waterpark" in the entire country since it was "built to serve its community" and moreover, the launch of this park was considered a risky endeavor since the waterpark was not built near a wealthier, highly populated area, which is the traditional areas that waterparks tend to be located within.

In December 2006, after Bahama Beach's second operating season, David Busch informed the city of Dallas that the park was operating at a loss of over $178,000 over the course of two years "Low discretionary income in the park's market area," was one of the main reasons given for the loss. Among other things, Busch suggested that re-branding the park to Hawaiian Falls might solve the problem. Also in 2006, Busch had repurchased his company from Hereschend Family Entertainment and sold the parks in Garland and the Colony to CNL Lifestyle Properties.

In 2007, the city of Dallas allowed the renaming of Bahama Beach to Hawaiian Falls Dallas. yet the re-branding did not sever the operations loss. This led to the city of Dallas and Hawaiian Falls agreeing to allow the termination of the eleven-year contract with the city . Today, the park is still open today and operates under its original name, Bahama Beach.

Also in 2007, the company acquired its first non-waterpark property, Aloha Adventure Park located in Lewisville, Texas.

=== 2008-2014 ===
In 2008, the chain expanded by adding Hawaiian Falls Mansfield in Mansfield, Texas.

In late 2010, the city of Roanoke, Texas, entered into a Letter of Intent with Harvest Family Entertainment to build another Hawaiian Falls waterpark in Roanoke. They later broke ground on November 22, 2010. Hawaiian Falls Roanoke opened Memorial Day weekend 2011 with the Mega WaterWorld attraction, the World's largest water playground.

In October 2011, Hawaiian Falls entered into an agreement with the city of Waco to take over the former Waco City Water Park. Hawaiian Falls Waco, opened Memorial Day weekend 2012.

In December 2011, Hawaiian Falls announced plans for a $2 million expansion for the Roanoke waterpark and another $4.3 million in expansions for the other three North Texas parks to be completed by Memorial Day 2012.

For the 2014 season, Hawaiian Falls opened two new locations in Pflugerville and White Settlement, Texas. Each of the new parks featured an adventure park that were projected to be open year-round. On August 6, 2013, the city of Pflugerville agreed on a development deal with Harvest Family Entertainment to build the sixth and largest Hawaiian Falls water park just south of the intersection of Texas State Highway 130 and Texas State Highway 45 in the city. The plan for the Pflugerville location consisted of a 15-acre water park along with a 5-acre adventure park, the largest water park in the company. In early November 2013, the city of White Settlement finalized with Hawaiian Falls to build their seventh location in the city in western Tarrant County, Texas where it features an adventure park, water park, event center, and an arcade center near Interstate 820. Both Pflugerville and White Settlement locations opened in summer 2014.

Busch promised the city of Pflugerville “year-round revenue," stating, "We will fill that place up all winter long." The adventure park did not prove viable enough to stay open through the coldest winter months, and Hawaiian Falls closed the adventure parks in White Settlement and Pflugerville in December 2014 until spring 2015. Eight year-round employees at Pflugerville were let go. Austin television news station KXAN ran a story about the lay-offs in response to Facebook comments of Pflugerville residents.

=== 2015-present ===
In 2016, the Pflugerville location's owners fell behind on payments and the park was sold and renamed Typhoon Texas Austin.

== Current properties ==
=== Hawaiian Falls Garland ===
The Waimea Bay slide complex contains 2 body slides & 2 tubes slides

Hawaiian Falls Garland (Also known as Hawaiian Falls Firewheel) was the first park in for the chain and officially opened on May 24, 2003, in Garland, Texas.

The water park sits on roughly 12 acres (49,000 m^{2}) adjacent to the Spring Creek Forest Preserve and is visible from the George Bush turnpike, which broke ground on December 18, 2002.

It consists of fifteen attractions: 11 water slides, a lazy river, an interactive water tree-house, a wave pool, and an activity pool, as well as a few food stands. The park was built for roughly $5.5 million in a public-private partnership between the city of Garland and Hawaiian Falls. In 2006 Hawaiian Falls Garland was purchased by CNL Lifestyle Properties for $6,305,000. CNL leased back the park to Horizon Family Holdings, which operated the park until ProParks Management Company took over the lease in May 2018. EPR Properties acquired the property from CNL in 2017.

Slides

- The Torpedo has two speed slides coming off a four-story tower. Riders become “human torpedoes” and race down the slides at speeds up to 40 mph. Opened in 2010.
- Waikiki Beach is a family wavepool that only goes to a depth of 5 feet (1.5 m). Opened in 2007.
- The Flyin' Hawaiian is a yellow, 60-foot (18 m)-tall single-rider body slide that features a series of small humps. Opened in 2003.
- The Waikiki Wipeout is a yellow, 60-foot (18 m)-tall body slide that features one giant drop. Opened in 2003.
- Pipeline has two twisting, turning inner-tube slides for one or two riders from a 45-foot (14 m) high tower. One slide is enclosed, the other half and half. The enclosed slide contains an interactive, state of the art music and lighting system which was added in 2012.
- Keiki Cove is an interactive children's water treehouse filled with fountains, slides, climbing nets, water jets, and a giant bucket that drops 1,000 gallons of water every few minutes. Opened in 2003.
- The Pineapple Express is a red and orange four-lane downhill mat racing slide. Opened in 2003.
- The Kona Kooler Adventure River is a circular lazy river with zero entry level beach with a portion of the river that contains waves making it an adventure river. Opened in 2003.
- The Hawaiian Half Pipe is a two-person innertube ride that propels riders straight up, then backwards from a 40-foot (12 m) drop. Opened in 2003.
- Splashwater Reef is an activity pool that contains waterfalls, a log cross, and a zero entry level beach area. Opened in 2004.

Dining and shopping

- Sharkey's Cafe is a small cafe located in the park that serves a variety of food choices including hamburgers, hotdogs, pizza, brisket, and other snacks. Opened in 2003.
- Island Trader's Gift Shop is a gift shop that rents lockers and offers snack items, sunscreen, Big Squirt water toys and Hawaiian Falls souvenirs. Opened in 2003.

=== Hawaiian Falls The Colony ===
33°04′35.0″N 96°52′30.4″W

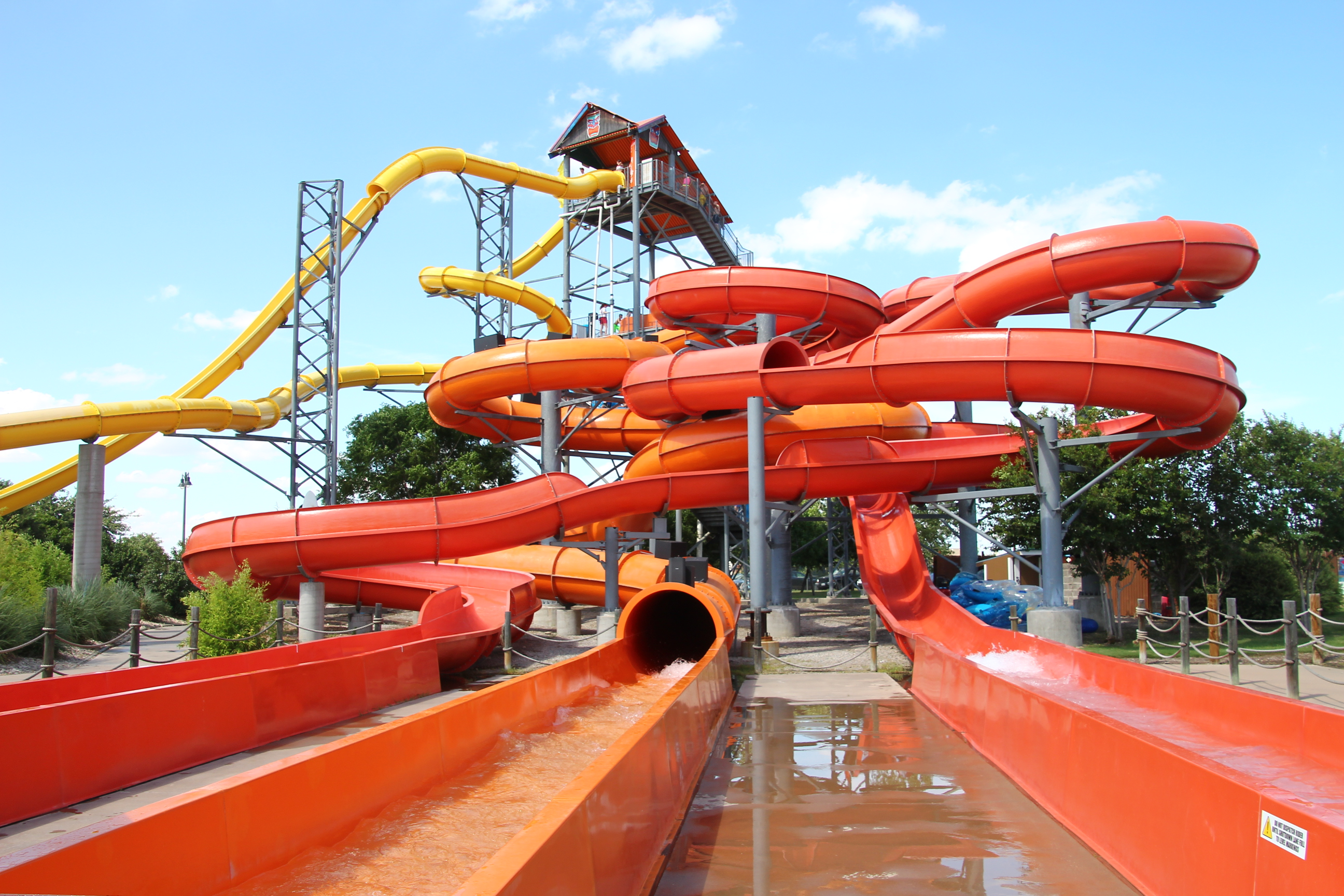
The Pipeline water slide ride

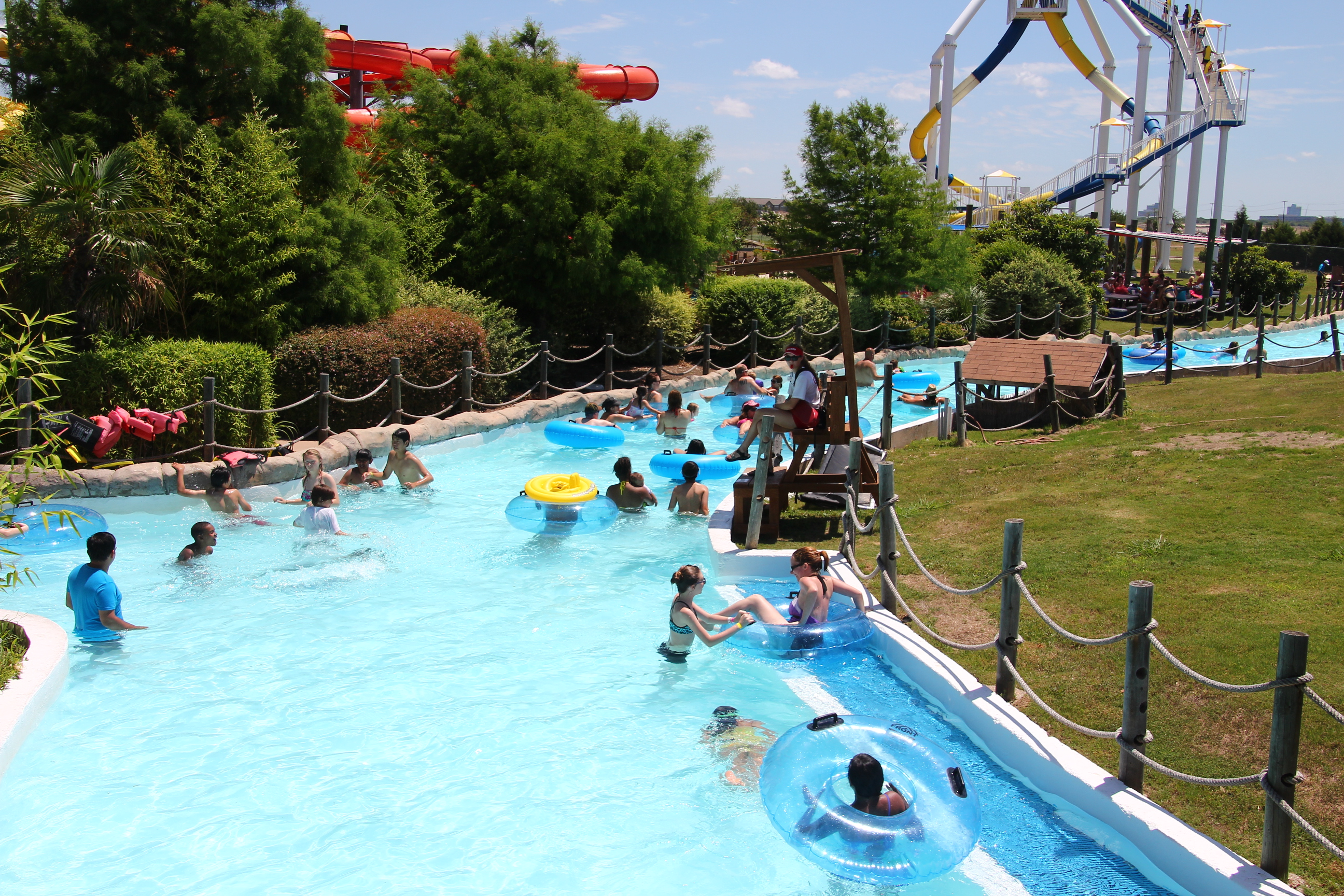
The Kona Kooler Adventure River lazy river

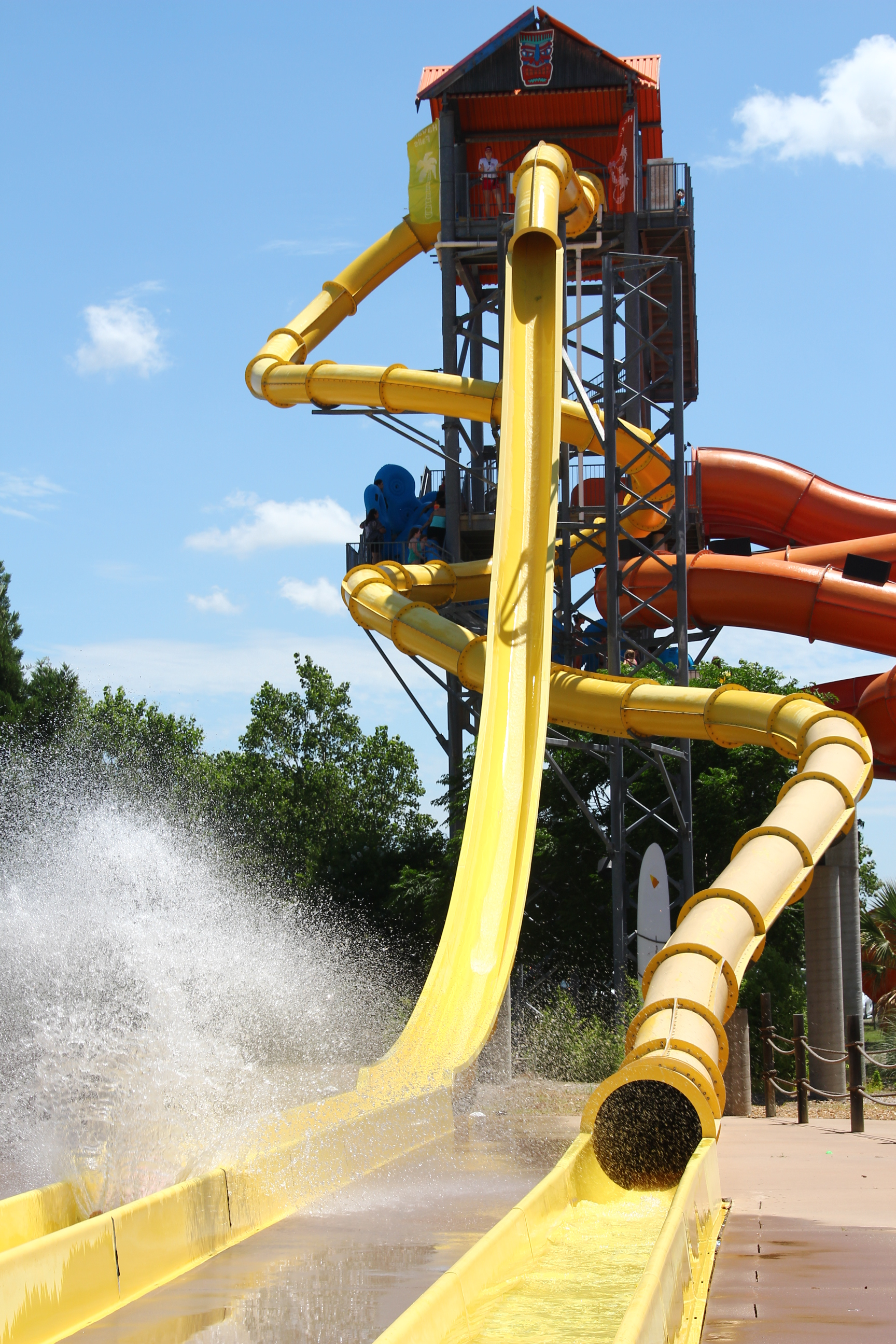
The Waikiki Wipeout slides

Hawaiian Falls The Colony the second Hawaiian Falls Water park in the Hawaiian Falls Water park chain and officially opened in May 2004 in The Colony, Texas.

It consists of fifteen attractions: 11 water slides, a lazy river, an interactive water tree-house, a wave pool, a water walkway, a private picnic area, and a private cabana area, as well as several food stands. The park was built by David Busch of Horizon Family, Inc., (now Hawaiian Falls Water parks), and is a joint public/private venture with the city of The Colony, TX. In 2006 Hawaiian Falls The Colony was purchased from Horizon Family Holdings by CNL Lifestyle Properties for $5.82 million. CNL leased back the park to Horizon Family Holdings, which operated the park until ProParks Management Company took over the lease in May 2018. EPR Properties acquired the property from CNL in 2017.

Current Slides

- The Torpedo has two speed slides coming off a 4-story tower. Riders become “human torpedoes” and race down the slides at speeds up to 40 mph. Opened in 2010.
- Breaker Bay is a family wavepool that goes to a depth of 4 feet (1.2 m). Opened in 2004.
- The Flyin' Hawaiian is a yellow 65-foot-tall (20 m) single-rider body slide that features an enclosed spiral. Opened in 2004.
- The Waikiki Wipeout is a yellow 65-foot-tall (20 m) body slide that features a giant drop. Opened in 2004.
- Pipeline features three orange 1 or 2 rider tube slides: an entirely enclosed tube slide, a partially enclosed, partially open tube slide, and a fully open tube slide. One of which (The enclosed) contains an interactive, state of the art music and lighting system which was added in August, 2012. Opened in 2004.
- Keiki Cove -- an interactive children's water treehouse filled with fountains, slides, climbing nets, water jets, and a giant bucket that drops 1,000 gallons of water every few minutes. Opened in 2004.
- The Honolulu Lulu is a three slide complex with twisting body slides. Opened in 2008.
- The Kona Kooler Adventure River is a circular lazy river with a portion of the river that contains waves making it an adventure river. Opened in 2004.
- The Hawaiian Half Pipe is a hot pink slide that propels riders straight up, then backwards from a 40-foot (12 m) tower. Opened in 2004.

Former Slides

- Whirlwind 360 was a thrill ride with two slides that launch on top of a 60-foot tower launching two riders down two tubes that arc into a bowl. Once the riders do many revolutions, they will get out on stairs at the middle of the bowl. Opened in 2012. Closed and Demolished in 2020

Dining and shopping

- Sharky's is a small cafe located in the park that serves a variety of food choices. Opened in 2004. Pizza Hut Express opened in 2007 (closed).
- Surfside BBQ offers a full range of grilled and smoked meats cooked fresh daily as well as Hawaiian “shave ice."
- Island Trader's Gift Shop is a gift shop that rents lockers and offers snack items, sunscreen, Big Squirt water toys and Hawaiian Falls souvenirs. Opened in 2004.

=== Hawaiian Falls Mansfield ===
Hawaiian Falls Mansfield is located in Mansfield, Texas, which was announced on September 10, 2007, and opened on Memorial Day Weekend in May 2008.

The water park sits on 14 acres (57,000 m^{2}) on Heritage Parkway and Texas State Highway 360.

It consists of 14 water slides, a lazy river, an interactive water tree-house, a football-field size wave pool, and a children's activity pool, a private cabana area, as well as a few food stands. The park cost roughly $10 million and was built by David Busch of Hawaiian Falls Water parks in a joint public/private venture with the city of Mansfield. Hawaiian Falls Water parks signed a 40-year lease with the city of Mansfield to operate the park.

Slides

- The Torpedo has two speed slides coming off a 4-story tower. Riders become “human torpedoes” and race down the slides at speeds up to 40 mph. Opened in 2010.
- Waikiki Beach is a football-field size wavepool.
- The Tiki Tower Slides feature 4 body slides.
- The Hightide Whirlpool is a funnel slide where the rider swirls around to the bottom and then gets flushed out.
- Keiki Cove is an interactive children's water treehouse filled with fountains, slides, climbing nets, water jets, and a giant bucket that drops 1,000 gallons of water every few minutes.
- The Kona Kooler is a circular lazy river.
- The Coconut Sprayground is an interactive children's area filled with fountains and water elements.
- LaLana Peak features 4 tube slides, riders can choose between an enclosed slide or half and half. One of which (One of the enclosed) contains an interactive, state of the art music and lighting system which was added in 2013.
- The Pineapple Express is a red and yellow 4 lane downhill mat racing slide.
- Cliffhanger tube slide.
- Splashwater Reef
- Hawaiian Halfpipe tube slide.

Dining and shopping

- Sharkey's Cafe -- a small cafe located in the park that serves a variety of food choices.
- Island Traders rents lockers and sells snacks, sunscreen, Big Squirt water toys and various Hawaiian Falls souvenirs. Opened in 2008.

=== Hawaiian Falls Roanoke ===
Hawaiian Falls Roanoke is located in Roanoke, Texas. The park was announced on November 22, 2010, and opened on Memorial Day weekend of 2011.

It became home of the world's largest aqua play structure which will include a three-lane racer, a family raft ride with several exciting body slides, one 500-gallon and one 1,000-gallon dump bucket, numerous interactive pulleys, wheels and much more. Ground broke for Hawaiian Falls Roanoke on November 22, 2010.

Slides

- Beach Blasters is the world's first dueling multiple tube racer where 2 two guest tubes are launched in opposite directions.
- Breaker Bay is a wave pool.
- The Flyin' Hawaiian and The Waikiki Wipeout two covered tube slide. One of which contains an interactive, state of the art music and lighting system which was added in 2013.
- Hawaiian Halfpipe tube slide.
- Hidetide Whirlpool body slide.
- Mega WaterWorld the world's largest aqua play structure.
- Monsoon and Typhoon two body slides.
- Pineapple Express
- Pipeline Plunge
- Rainforest River Adventure lazy river.
- Rip Curl tube slide.
- Water Walkway spray kids area.

Dining and shopping

- Sharkey's is food-court restaurant that calls the original Hawaiian Falls building home, serving burgers, hot dogs, nachos, pizza and more.

=== Hawaiian Falls Waco ===
Hawaiian Falls Waco is located in Waco, Texas. The park is the fifth and most recent addition to the Hawaiian Falls Water park chain. It was originally known as the Waco Water Park until October 2011 when Hawaiian Falls and the city of Waco agreed to a takeover. Three times its original size, it reopened as Hawaiian Falls Waco on May 26, 2012.

The park sits on approximately 14 acres of land. As of 2019, the park had 12 slides, 3 restaurants and 1 gift shop. It is known for its Breaker Bay family wave pool, the first large-scale wave pool in central Texas, and the 800-foot long Kona Kooler lazy river.

== Former properties ==
- Dallas, Texas (closed 2007)
- Lewisville, Texas (closed 2008)
- White Settlement, Texas (closed 2015)
- Pflugerville, Texas (closed 2016)

== Proposed properties ==
=== Fontana, California ===
In 2005 Fontana, California City Council authorized Fontana City Manager to enter into a lease agreement with Hawaiian Falls to renovate and improve the waterpark already inside the Martin Tudor Regional Park. The City Planning Commission would still need to approve the deal. Some Fontana residents supported the park, but neighbors living near the park were concerned about noise, traffic, and security issues. In 2006, the existing waterpark was closed for renovation “because the ground at the hilly location became unsettled, and as a result, cracks began to surface in the equipment”. In 2012 City reopened the renovated park without Hawaiian Falls. San Bernardino County funds and $400,000 state grant were used for the renovation. No private company seems to have been involved. Entrance is approximately $3 per person.

=== Gilbert, Arizona ===
In May 2006 Hawaiian Falls withdrew an application submitted to city of Gilbert, Arizona to develop a Hawaiian Falls park there, saying they did not think they would be able to meet their deadlines for the project. Gilbert residents had voiced opposition to the project for over a year, citing environmental issues, and arguing that it would be a violation of the separation of church and state to allow a company who openly proselytizes in their parks to partner with the city.

=== Greenville, Texas ===
In 2012 the city of Greenville Economic Development Director Greg Simms approached Hawaiian Falls about a public-private partnership to build a $12 to $14 million waterpark in that City. On November 19, 2013 Greenville City Council chose to partner with Splash Kingdom instead of Hawaiian Falls. Splash Kingdom was providing its own funding, $5 million, while Hawaiian Falls was requesting over $10 million in incentives from the city.

=== Escondido, California ===
On April 27, 2013, Hawaiian Falls presented a public-private partnership proposal to the city of Escondido's economic development subcommittee. Hawaiian Falls proposed an 80–20 split on the construction of the proposed $13 million waterpark, with Escondido contributing $10.4 million and Hawaiian Falls contributing $2.6 million. Hawaiian Falls proposed that the park be built in the city's existing Kit Carson Park. Hawaiian Falls would pay the City 5% of the park's revenues. Escondido Mayor urged Hawaiian Falls to come back with a better deal because payment on revenue bonds used to fund the park would be at least double what Hawaiian Falls proposed paying in rent. He said Escondido would consider furnishing the land, but not the money for the construction. On April 15, 2013 angry Escondido residents presented a petition to City Council opposing Hawaiian Falls’ proposal. Escondido Mayor told residents “The fact that you are here today will make sure this proposal won't go anywhere. It will put the skids on this project.”

=== Rockwall, Texas ===
On April 7, 2014 the Rockwall, Texas City Council voted not to enter into the public-private partnership with Hawaiian Falls. Rockwall Mayor David Sweet told reporters, “I am very hesitant and have serious concerns about another public-private partnership involving a $25 million debt paid back over 30 years.” Mayor Sweet and city council were also concerned about water issues during a statewide drought.

=== Elk Grove, California ===
In October 2013, the city of Elk Grove, California selected P3 International to design, build, and operate an Aquatic Center for the city. Hawaiian Falls was a subcontractor for P3 and would be responsible for the waterpark that was proposed as part of the Aquatic Center. On April 14, 2014 P3 International notified the City that Hawaiian Falls had withdrawn from the project. On September 10, 2014 City Council voted to build the aquatic center without a waterpark.

=== Richland County, South Carolina ===
On June 12, 2014 Hawaiian Falls executives proposed a $20 million waterpark to the Richland County Council – Hawaiian Falls would design, build, and operate the park if the county would fund it. On June 12, 2014 County Council approved a 2% hospitality tax on prepared meals to fund a waterpark. Later in June 2014, members of the Richland County Council spent $7,560 in tax dollar to visit Hawaiian Falls parks in Texas. A request for proposals on the waterpark was issued on August 11, 2014 and closed on September 18, 2014. Plans for this project were scrapped on April 19, 2016 after the Richland County Council declined funding for the project.
