= Pflugerville Colored Addition =

- Historic district
- Historic Colored Addition
- Interactive map of Pflugerville Colored Addition
- Location within Texas Pflugerville Colored Addition (the United States)
- Coordinates: 30°26′46″N 97°37′52″W
- Country: United States
- State: Texas
- County: Travis County
- City: Pflugerville

Pflugerville Colored Addition (also referred to as the Historic Colored Addition) is a historically significant neighborhood on Farm Road 1825 west of Pflugerville, Travis County, Texas, United States.

== History ==
The settlement was founded in 1910 by La Rue Noton, for black cotton and ice factory workers who were excluded from migrating into Pflugerville. Noton owned 1200 acres of land, set aside roughly an acre, and sold lots to the black workers for $50 each. In April 1910, the settlement was officially recorded in county documents as "Pflugerville's Colored Addition". The original settlers of this community includes Pete McDade, George Caldwell, Will Smith, Ned Tyson, Willie Allen, and their families.

A church called the St. Mary Baptist Church was built in the area in 1910, and then another in 1920, called the St. Matthew's Missionary Church, which would close in 1973. In the same year, the community, by the help of citizens Mr.Tyson and George Caldwell, would also set a land aside for a cemetery for deceased African Americans, called Russel's Place to Rest (formerly St. Mary's cemetery), and another for deceased Mexican Americans, called Santa Maria Cemetery (formerly San Camilo). St. Mary Baptist Church was rebuilt in 1959 on Farm Road 1825.

The community built an elementary school in 1928. In 1965, following the statewide trends of school desegregation in Texas caused by United States v. Texas (1970), including the formerly segragated Pflugerville school district, the school in Colored Addition would then move to main Pflugerville.

In 1978, the Travis County commissioners proposed for the community's official name to the Western Addition. However, that planned was cancelled due to their inability to gain legal approval from its residents to change its name.

In 2020, with a $230,000 budget, the settlement would oversee major improvements in its streets, utilities, and drainage, with the oversight of the Pflugerville city council. By 2022, about $5.7 million dollars were spent for improvements in the community. In 2025, the Pflugerville City Council approved a contract with a family-owned construction company, Joe Bland Construction, to improve several streets, sidewalks, lighting, plumbing, underground utilities and utilities duct bank, allocating $8 million into the project.
