= East Blackland Solar Project =

Proposed solar photovoltaic power plant near Pflugerville, Texas

East Blackland Solar Project (aka Pflugerville Solar Farm)
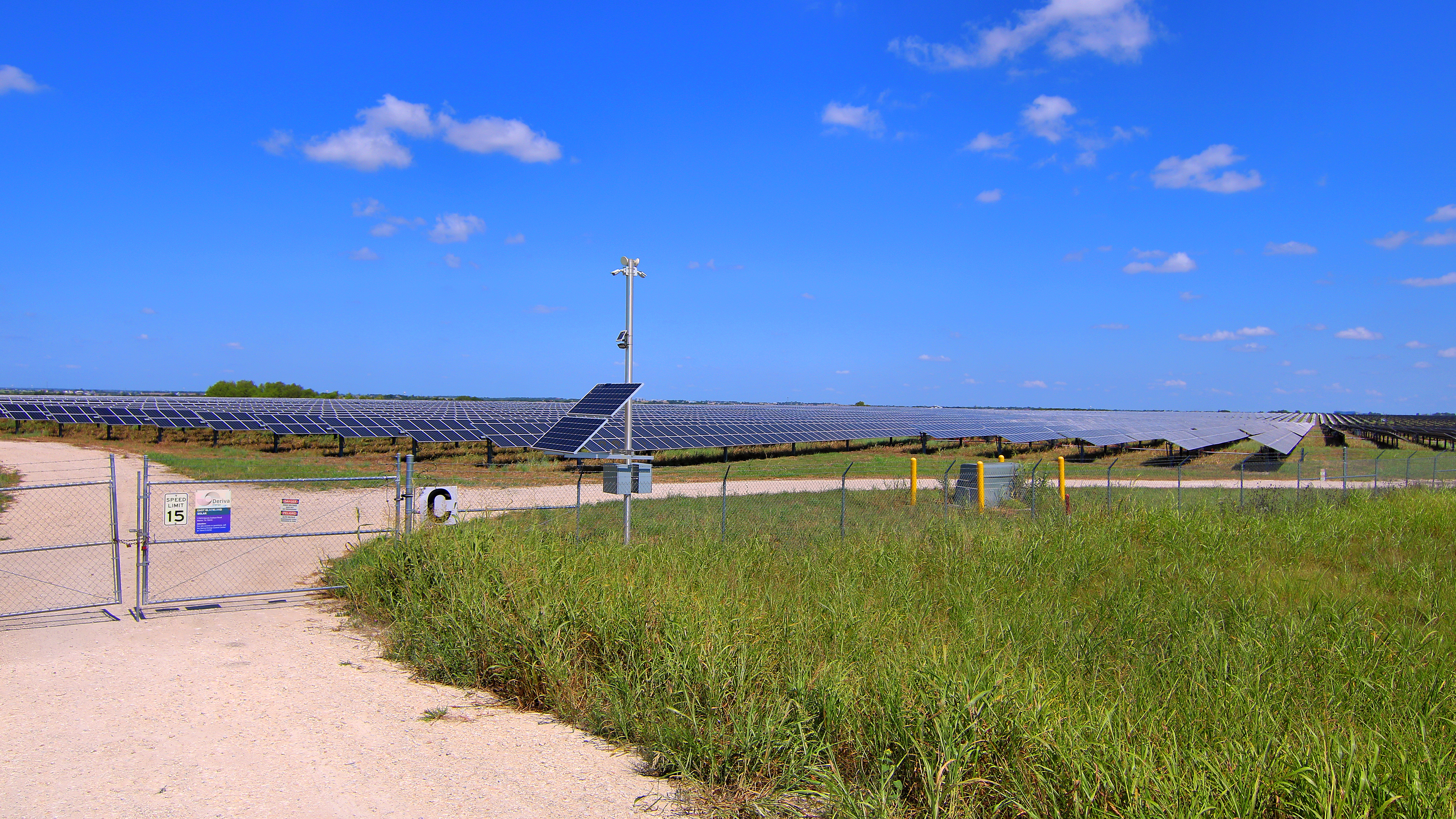
- Official name: East Blackland Solar Project
- Country: United States
- Location: 17025 Manda Carlson Rd, Manor, Texas
- Coordinates: 30°26′04″N 97°27′32″W
- Status: Under construction
- Construction began: August 18, 2020
- Construction cost: $234 million
- Owner: Duke Energy

Solar farm
- Type: Flat-panel PV
- Site area: 941

Power generation
- Nameplate capacity: 144 MW

The East Blackland Solar Project, also known as the Pflugerville Solar Farm, is a 144 megawatt (MW) alternating current (AC) solar photovoltaic (PV) power plant near the City of Pflugerville in Travis, County, Texas, United States. Originally a 60 MWAC plant, a ceremonial ground breaking was announced in December 2010 with completion expected in June 2013, but construction start was delayed until July 2020, because no buyer for the electricity was available for contract.

RRE Mehta Power was the original developer on the project. The current developer is Recurrent Energy, LLC, a division of Canadian Solar. CIT Group arranged for financing of $162 million of the $234 million project, which finally broke ground in July 2020. Austin Energy will buy electricity generated by the project under the terms of a 15-year power purchase agreement (PPA).

The system was sold to Duke Energy in 2020, before construction was completed. The project will begin operating in January 2024.

== See also ==
- List of photovoltaic power stations
- Renewable energy in the United States
- Renewable portfolio standard
- Solar power in Texas
