= John B. Connally High School =

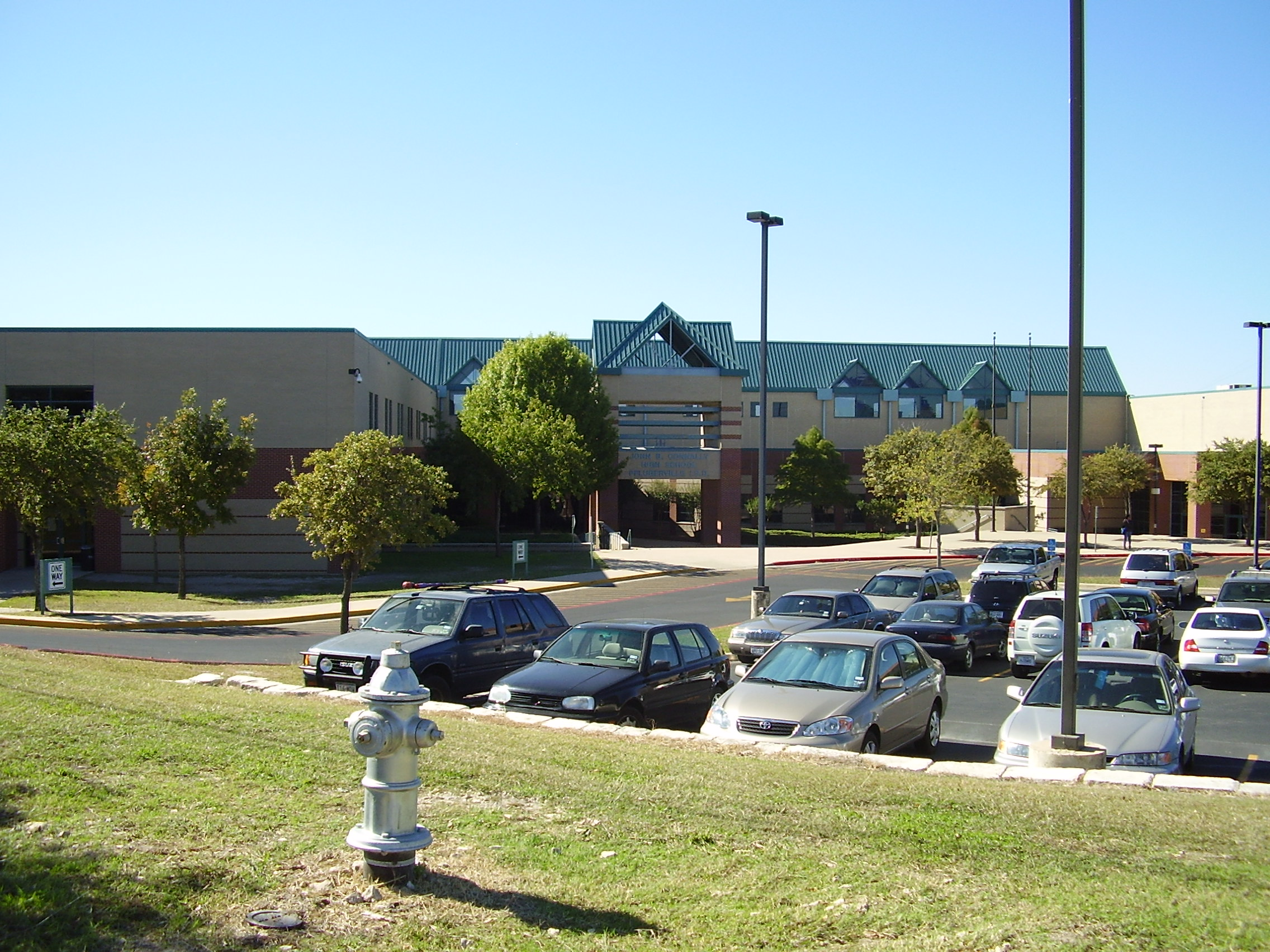

Location
- 13212 North Lamar Blvd. Austin, Texas 78753; United States; 30.4188°N 97.6764°W

Information
- Type: Public high school
- Established: 1996
- School district: Pflugerville Independent School District
- Principal: Daniel Garcia
- Staff: 125.03 (FTE)
- Grades: 9-12
- Enrollment: 1,875 (2025–2026)
- Student to teacher ratio: 14.53
- Campus size: 351,455 sq. ft.
- Colors: Green, black, and white
- Athletics conference: UIL Class 5A
- Mascot: Cougar
- Website: chs.pfisd.net

John B. Connally High School is a public secondary school in Austin, Texas, United States. The school, which opened in 1996, serves 9–12 and is part of the Pflugerville Independent School District.

It was named in honor of John B. Connally. The school opened with grades 9 and 10, with an expected student body of 640. The school was to add grades 11-12, and the planned amount of students would be 1,400.

== Notable alumni ==
- Jonté Buhl (class of 2000) — cornerback who played for the Atlanta Falcons, played college football for the Texas A&M Aggies
- Stanford Routt (class of 2001) — cornerback who played for the Oakland Raiders, Kansas City Chiefs, and Houston Texans, played college football for the Houston Cougars
- Greg Golson (class of 2004) — outfielder who played for the Philadelphia Phillies, Texas Rangers, and New York Yankees
- Steven Sheffield (class of 2006) — quarterback who played in the AFL, played college football for the Texas Tech Red Raiders
- Jahdae Barron (class of 2020) — cornerback for the Denver Broncos, played college football for the Texas Longhorns
- Jamal Shead — point guard for Toronto Raptors
