= Edward C. Fritz =

American attorney and conservationist (1916–2008)

Edward "Ned" C. Fritz (February 8, 1916 – December 19, 2008) was an American attorney and conservationist in Texas who was instrumental in establishing the Big Thicket National Preserve and wilderness areas in East Texas, and founded a number of successful nonprofit organizations.

== Career ==
Fritz was born in Philadelphia and educated at the University of Chicago and Southern Methodist University. He was a U.S. Navy flight instructor during World War II (one of his students was future President George H. W. Bush), then began his career as a trial lawyer in Dallas, Texas, where he was also active in the state Democratic Party. Fritz founded or co-founded the Texas chapter of The Nature Conservancy in 1964 and, subsequently, the Texas League of Conservation Voters, Texas Conservation Alliance, Texas Land Conservancy, and Dallas Sierra Club. After retiring from his law practice in 1974, Fritz personally led numerous citizens’ lawsuits to list endangered species, change clearcutting and other practices on U.S. national forests, and halt or modify reservoirs and other water development projects. He also wrote books about the wilderness areas he helped establish, clearcutting, and other topics. His papers are housed at Southern Methodist University, where he received his law degree.
