= Pflugerville Independent School District =

School district in Texas, US

Address
- 1401 West Pecan Street Pflugerville, Texas, 78660; United States

District information
- Grades: PK–12
- Schools: 35
- NCES District ID: 4834830

Students and staff
- Students: 25,297
- Teachers: 1,809.01 (on an FTE basis)
- Student–teacher ratio: 13.98:1

Other information
- Website: www.pfisd.net

Pflugerville Independent School District (PFISD) is a public school district founded in 1902 and is based in Pflugerville, Texas (USA). The District encompasses approximately ninety-five square miles and includes all or part of six municipalities including Pflugerville, Austin, Coupland, Hutto, Manor and Round Rock. As of 2013 PISD covers 10.7 square miles (28 km^{2}) of land within the City of Austin, making up 3.4% of the city's territory.

In addition to Travis County, it covers parts of Williamson County.

In 2011, the school district was rated "academically acceptable" by the Texas Education Agency. In 2014, the district installed solar panels at 11 of its schools.

== Schools ==
=== High Schools (9–12) ===
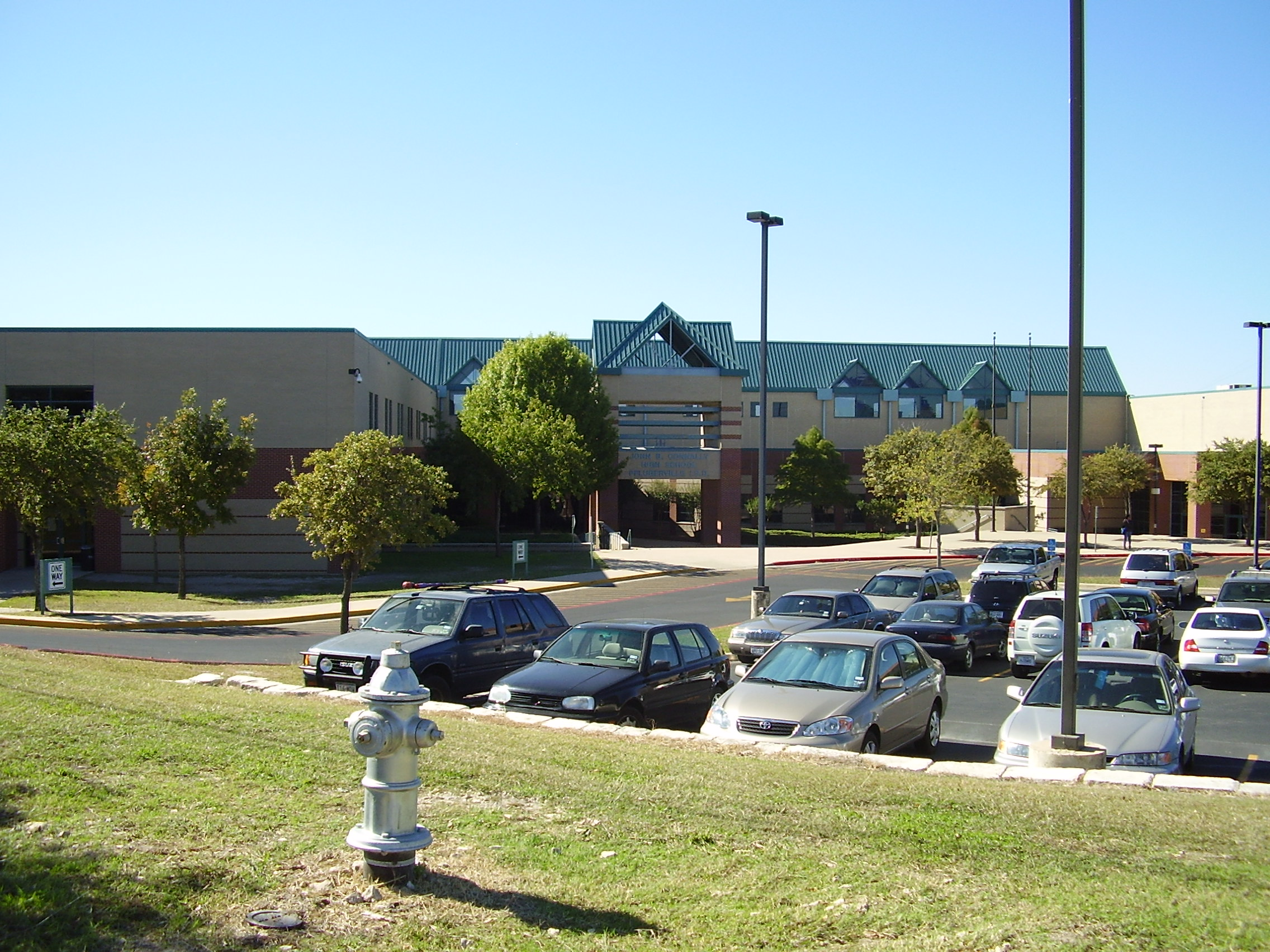
John B. Connally High School

- John B. Connally High School (Austin)
- Hendrickson High School
- Pflugerville High School
- Weiss High School
- PACE High School (Alternative campus)

=== Middle Schools (6–8) ===
- Bohls Middle School
- Cele Middle School
- Dessau Middle School (Austin)
- Kelly Lane Middle School
- Park Crest Middle School
- Pflugerville Middle School
- Westview Middle School (Austin)

=== Elementary Schools (Pre-K–5) ===
- Barron Elementary School
- Brookhollow Elementary School
- Caldwell Elementary School
- Carpenter Elementary School
- Copperfield Elementary School (Austin)
- Dearing Elementary School
- Delco Elementary School (Austin)
- Dessau Elementary School (Austin)
- Hidden Lake Elementary School
- Highland Park Elementary School
- Mott Elementary School
- Murchison Elementary School
- Northwest Elementary School (Austin/Wells Branch)
- Parmer Lane Elementary School (Austin)
- Pflugerville Elementary School
- River Oaks Elementary School (Austin)
- Riojas Elementary School
- Rowe Lane Elementary School
- Spring Hill Elementary School
- Timmerman Elementary School
- Wieland Elementary School
- Windermere Elementary School

=== Other ===
- Provan Opportunity Center Middle School and High School (K-12, Discipline Center)
- PACE (Alternative Campus)

== See also ==
- List of school districts in Texas
