= Idora M. Plowman =

American author who wrote as Betsy Hamilton

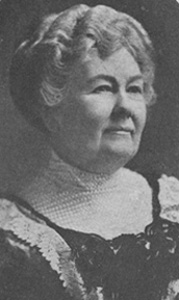
Idora M. Plowman

Idora Elizabeth McClellan Plowman Moore (October 31, 1843 – February 26, 1929) (Note: Source taken from a contemporary newspaper and Waller. Different published sources have given February 2 or 16 of 1929 or dates in 1928 as her date of death. February 26, 1928 is the apparently incorrect date on her tombstone. A society newspaper page confirms that she was alive in April 1928 and receiving guests.) was an American author, "one of the first Alabama writers to recognize the pecuniary aspects of local-color writing." She wrote using the pen-name Betsy Hamilton.

== Early life ==
Idora Elizabeth McClellan Plowman was born near Talladega, Alabama, on October 31, 1844. She was the daughter of Gen. William Blount McClellan (1798–1881) and Martha Thompson Roby (1809–1858). Her father traced the lineage of his family to William Wallace, of Scotland. He was a graduate of West Point, and before the Civil War held the office of Brigadier-General, commanding the militia troops of the counties of Talladega, Clay and Randolph in Alabama.

== Career ==
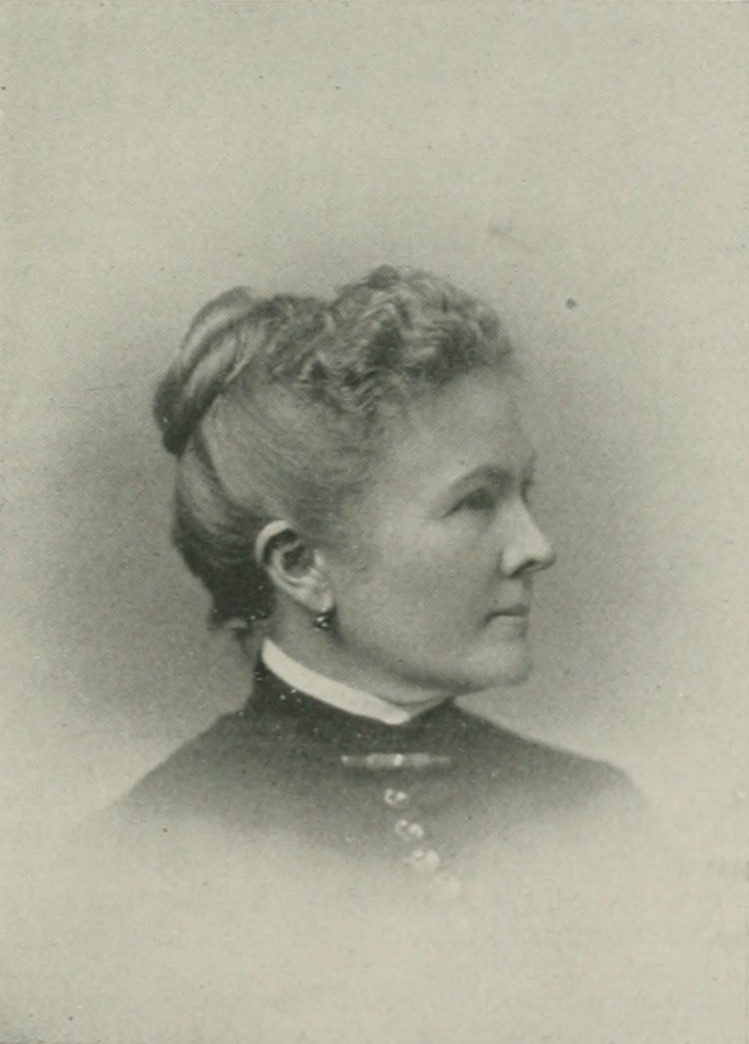
Idora M. Plowman, A woman of the century

She was known by her pen-name "Betsy Hamilton." Betsy Hamilton was the author of innumerable dialect sketches depicting the humorous side of life, life as seen by herself on the old time plantations, and in the backwoods among the class denominated as Southern "Crackers." Her first sketch, "Betsy's Trip to Town," written in 1872, was printed in the Talladega Alabama Reporter and reprinted in many newspapers and magazines, including the New York Sun. After the death of her husband in 1878, she was regularly engaged for a number of years on the great southern weekly, Sunny South and on the Atlanta Constitution, papers published in Atlanta, Georgia. Her articles were entitled "The Backwoods," "Familiar Letters," and "Betsy Hamilton to Her Cousin Saleny." At the personal request of S.S. Conant, the editor of Harper's Weekly, several of her sketches went to that paper, and were illustrated as they appeared in its columns. Henry W. Grady of the Atlanta Constitution was her warm personal friend and aided much in bringing her talent before the world. Her articles have been copied in some of the European papers.

When her father died in 1881 she had to support herself and taught school for a time.

While the "Betsy Hamilton Sketches" gave their author a wide fame and deserved popularity, doubtless her most popular achievements were her public recitations and impersonations. One writer compared her to the comedian Joe Jefferson. She performed in Eatonton, Georgia, New York City, Auburn, Alabama, Oklahoma and South Carolina.

In 1921 she released a limited edition of her sketches, Betsy Hamilton: Southern Character Sketches, through the J.S. Dickert Printing Company in Atlanta.

Later in life she devoted much of her time to the Alabama Synodical Orphans Home at Talladega, where she established the Betsy Hamilton Scholarship Fund for the education of outstanding students.

== Personal life ==
On December 19, 1866, Idora Elizabeth McClellan and lawyer Albert White Plowman (1838–1868) of Talladega were married. Her husband died suddenly after a few years of marriage. On 14 March 1892, Plowman married in Atlanta, Georgia, Capt. Martin Van Buren Moore (1837–1900), of the editorial staff of the Atlanta Constitution. They moved to Auburn, Alabama.

She died on February 26, 1929, in Talladega and is buried at Oak Hill Cemetery.

== Legacy ==
The Alabama Writers Conclave dedicated a room in the library of the Alabama College at Montevallo to Betsy Hamilton Collection of Alabama Writers.

In 1937 her stepdaughter, Julia Moore Smith, compiled a memorial volume of nineteen of her sketches.
