= Lake Pflugerville =

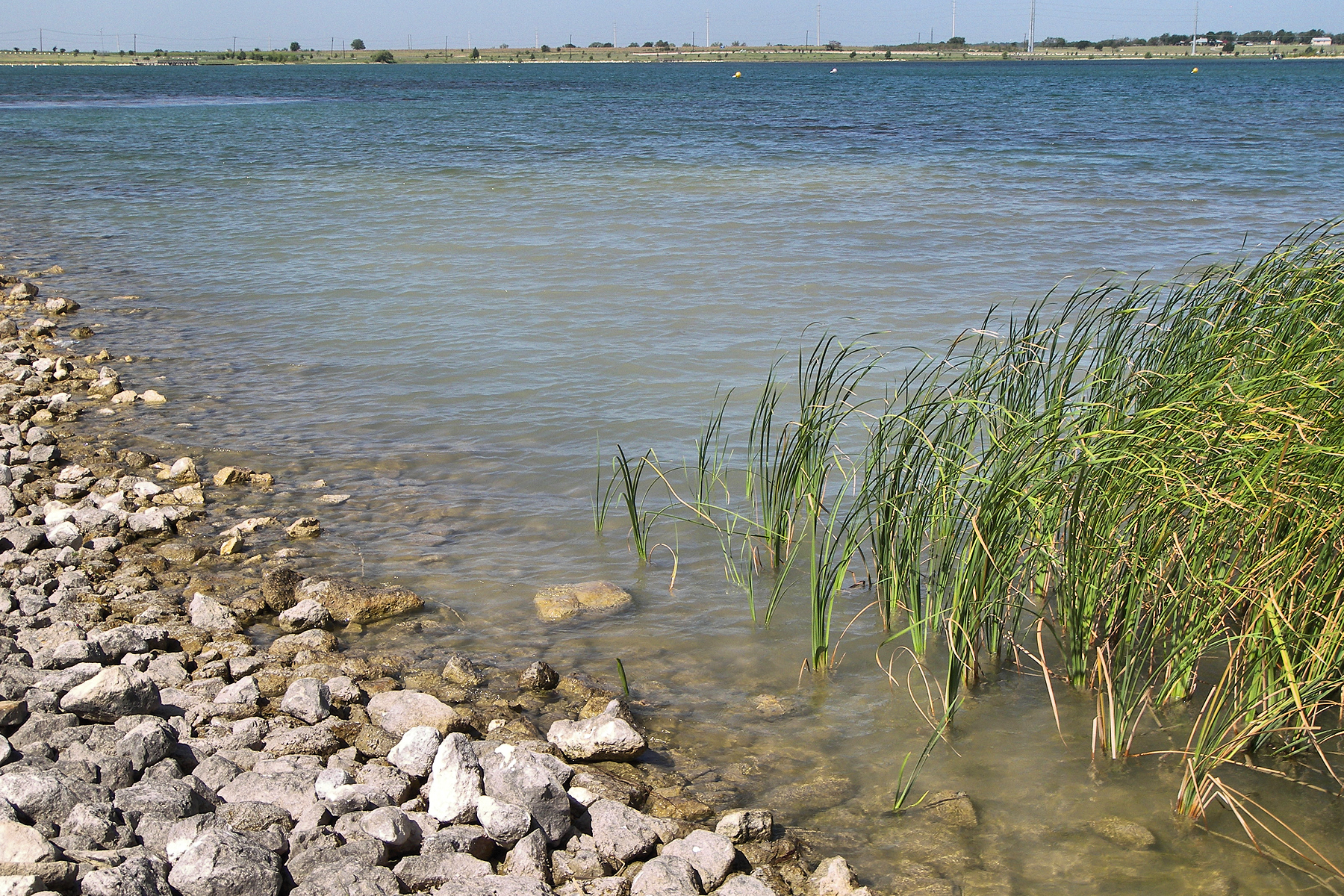

- Location within Texas Location within the United States
- Location: Pflugerville, Texas
- Coordinates: 30°26.34′N 97°34.27′W
- Type: Reservoir
- Primary inflows: Colorado River
- Primary outflows: Colorado River
- Basin countries: United States
- Surface area: 180 acres (73 ha)
- Average depth: 10 ft (3.0 m)
- Max. depth: 36 ft (11 m)
- Water volume: 1,700 acre⋅ft (0.0021 km^{3})
- Surface elevation: 650 ft (200 m)

Lake Pflugerville is a reservoir in Pflugerville, Texas in the United States. Construction of the 180-acre reservoir began in 2005 and was completed in 2006. Pumps are used to flow water through a 16-mile pipeline to the reservoir from the lower Colorado River. Its main purpose is to provide water to area residents.

Recreation activities also surround the reservoir. Amenities include a 3 mi (4.8 km)-long granite hike and bike trail and fishing piers. Adjacent to the reservoir is Lake Pflugerville Park, which was completed in 2010. The park includes kayak rentals, pavilions/picnic areas, and a beach area.

Lake Pflugerville is home to several events, including KIDFish and the Lake Pflugerville Triathlon.

== Flora ==
According to Parks & Recreation Pflugerville, Texas , the aquatic flora found at the lake consists of: Chara, Hydrilla, Naiad, and Pondweed.

== Fauna ==
According to the Texas Water Development Board, there is an infestation of Zebra mussel that caused damage on membrane equipment belonging to the City of Pflugerville. The lake also contains other species of fish such as Largemouth bass, Channel catfish, and the Common Carp.

== Uses/Purpose ==
Information provided by Texas Commission on Environmental Quality displays that as of 3/1/2022, Lake Pflugerville provides water to a population of 29,922 and has 9974 connections. The has a priority value of W for watch, which means that the water source is able to provide water for more than 180-days. Lake Pflugerville is in Texas Commission on Environmental Quality Drought Response Stage 1, meaning there are mild restrictions and "...use of water for non-essential uses is restricted...".
