= Pflugerville, Texas =

- City
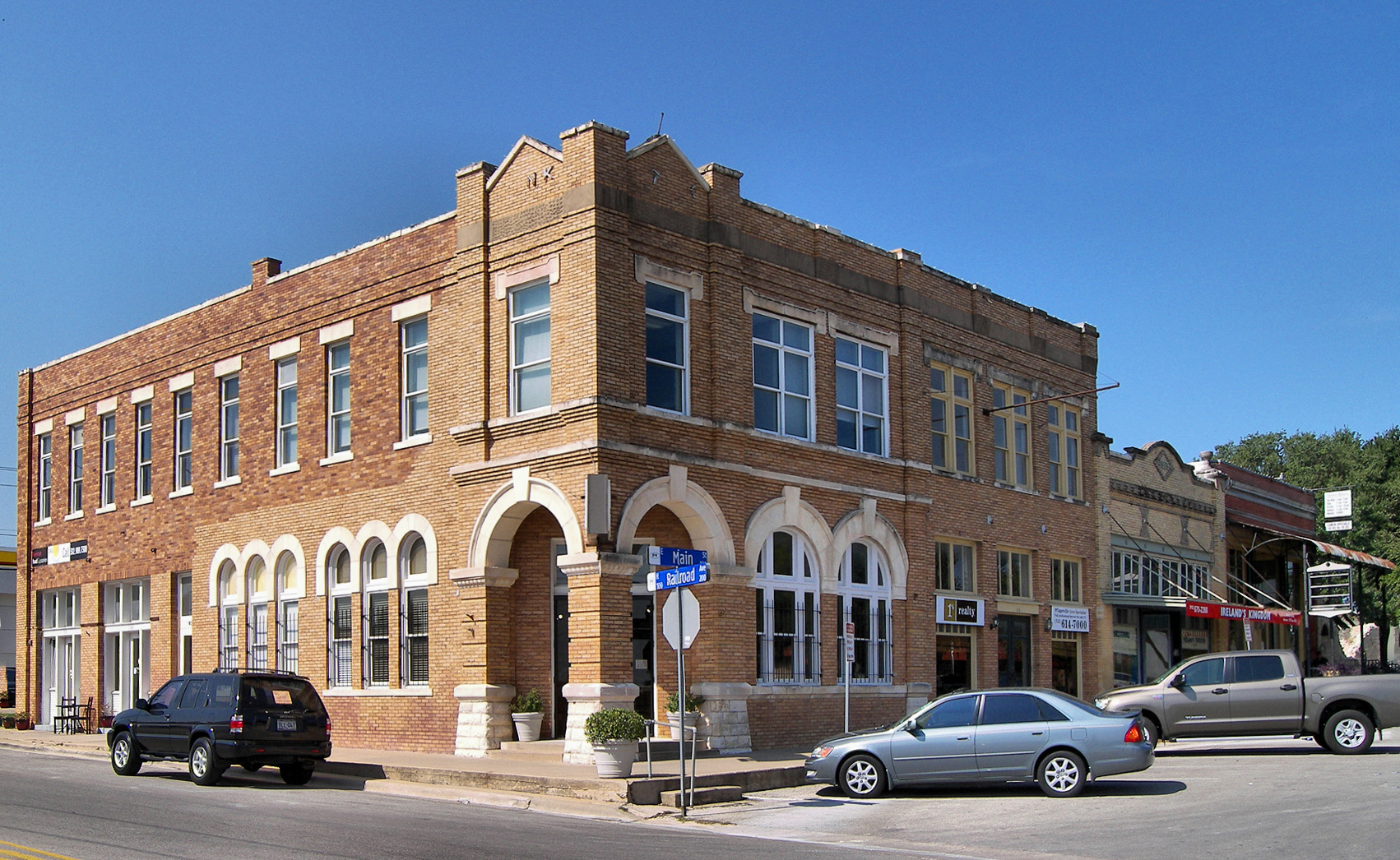
- The East Main Street Historic District
- Etymology: City of plowmen
- Motto: "Willkommen" (English: "Welcome")
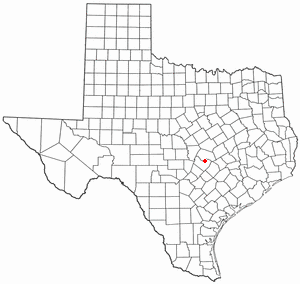
- Location of Pflugerville, Texas

- Coordinates: 30°27′27″N 97°38′24″W
- Country: United States
- State: Texas
- Counties: Travis, Williamson
- Settled: 1849
- Incorporated: July 24, 1965; 61 years ago
- Named for: Henry Pfluger Sr.

Government
  - Type: Council-Manager
  - City Council: Victor Gonzales

Area
  - Total: 25.57 sq mi (66.23 km^{2})
  - Land: 25.56 sq mi (66.19 km^{2})
  - Water: 0.015 sq mi (0.04 km^{2})
- Elevation: 686 ft (209 m)

Population (2020)
  - Total: 65,191
  - Density: 2,551/sq mi (984.9/km^{2})
- Time zone: UTC-6 (Central (CST))
  - Summer (DST): UTC-5 (CDT)
- ZIP codes: 78660, 78691
- Area code(s): 512 & 737
- FIPS code: 48-57176
- GNIS feature ID: 2411411
- Website: PflugervilleTX.gov

Pflugerville (/ˈfluːɡərvɪl/ FLOO-gər-vil) is a city in Travis County, Texas, United States, with a small portion in Williamson County. The population was 65,191 at the 2020 census. Pflugerville is a suburb of Austin and part of the Austin–Round Rock– Metropolitan Statistical Area. It was named after the original German settlers who farmed the area starting in 1849. The city was first incorporated in July 1965.

== History ==
=== Pfluger homestead ===
The area was initially settled by German immigrant Henry Pfluger Sr. (1803–1867) and members of his family from late 1849 into early 1850. Pfluger had been a wealthy farmer in Germany, but lost all of his property during the revolutions of 1848. He arrived in the country with $1,600 and purchased 160 acres (0.65 km^{2}) of land two miles (3.2 km) east of Austin from John Liese, a brother-in-law who had immigrated before him. In 1853, Pfluger paid Liese $960 for a 960-acre (3.9 km^{2}) tract of land in an area known as Brushy Knob. There, the family lived in a five-room log cabin and raised corn, wheat, rye, beans, sweet potatoes, and sugar cane. The Pfluger family also owned several slaves, some of whom were fluent in German.

=== Community development ===
The beginnings of the community did not develop until after the Civil War.

During the 1870s, a school and Lutheran church were established at the settlement. The first commercial business in the community was a general store built by Louis Bohls in 1890. Two local organizations, the German-American Mutual Assistance Foundation, to insure residents against natural disasters; and "Pflugerville Schützen und Kegel Verein," a shooting and bowling club, were started. Pflugerville's post office opened in 1893, with Louis Bohls serving as its first postmaster.

The population reached approximately 250 during the mid-1890s, and a small downtown developed, although most residents did their banking and shipping in Round Rock, eight miles (13 km) to the northwest.

Wooden buildings were erected on Main Street and Pecan Street, many by Conrad Pfluger, one of Henry Pfluger Sr.'s eight sons.

In 1904, the Missouri–Kansas–Texas Railroad (MKT) completed its track between Georgetown and Austin, passing just outside Pflugerville. Its close proximity to the line caused the community to grow rapidly.

On February 19, 1904, the town site of Pflugerville was platted by George Pfluger and his son, Albert, dedicating streets and alleys for the town from the Alexander Walter and C. S. Parrish Surveys in Travis County. The plat consisted of sixteen blocks, rights-of-way, and the depot grounds to the MKT. The first addition to the town was the six-block Wuthrich Addition, platted on November 22, 1904. The first cotton gin was built by Otto Pfluger in 1904. It was destroyed by fire in 1931 and a new one was built at the same location.

On June 8, 1906, the Farmers State Bank of Pflugerville opened with William Pfluger as its president and A.W. Pfluger as cashier.

The first issues of the Pflugerville Press, a weekly newspaper, began publishing on August 7, 1907, and operated through October 29, 1942.

In 1910, black workers who worked in the Pflugerville cotton industry were not allowed to move into the town. Farmer La Rue Norton, who owned 1,200 acres (4.9 km^{2}) of land west of Pflugerville, set aside an acre and sold lots to the workers at $50 each. County records listed the settlement as Pflugerville's Colored Addition in April 1910.

The first German Day celebration in Pflugerville took place on May 29, 1910.

In 1913, H.S. Pfluger built the Sky Dome Theater, which showed motion pictures to the accompaniment of a player piano on Friday and Saturday nights. It closed in 1928.

In the early 1920s, Pflugerville was home to an estimated 500 residents.

During that period, several area school districts consolidated with Pflugerville High School.

=== 1930 to 1964 ===
Around 580 people lived in the community in 1930. The arrival of the Great Depression halted what had been a lengthy period of growth in Pflugerville. The population fell slightly to 500 in 1940. In the years immediately after World War II, the community lost around a quarter of its population as citizens moved to Austin and other larger cities with greater employment opportunities. Despite the challenges of population loss and limited economic development, Pflugerville managed to survive.

The community gained national attention when the Pflugerville Panthers won 55 consecutive football games from 1958 to 1962.

=== Incorporation and growth ===
Efforts to incorporate Pflugerville culminated in an election on July 24, 1965. A total of 102 votes were cast, with 60 (58.8%) supporting the proposition and 42 (41.2%) opposed. The town was incorporated under a commission form of government. On April 4, 1970, an election was held that changed the form of government from commissioner to aldermanic, providing for an elected mayor and five aldermen.

Pflugerville's population began to rebound after its incorporation, and by the 1970 census, it stood at 549. That figure had risen to 745 by 1980.

A weekly newspaper, the Pflugerville Pflag, began publication in 1980.

During most of the 1980s, new development made Pflugerville one of the fastest-growing cities in Texas. Estimates from the late 1980s were as high as 3,900. Although a statewide recession slowed the boom, Pflugerville's population grew to 4,444 in 1990.

=== 1990 to 2000s ===
Throughout the 1990s, the city of Austin experienced a rapid rise in its population. This was also the case in suburban areas surrounding the city. Pflugerville more than doubled in size by the next census in 2000. Since then, Pflugerville has grown by approximately 20,000, with the total number of residents approaching 40,000 as of 2008. The 2010 Census placed Pflugerville's population at 46,936, but with annexations since the 2010 census, the U.S. Census Bureau estimates it to be 59,245 as of July 1, 2016. According to data from 2000, 2010, and 2017 population estimates compiled by the U.S. Census Bureau, Pflugerville has the largest percentage black population out of all suburban cities in the Austin metro.

Pflugerville elected its first Hispanic Mayor, Victor Gonzales, in 2016.

=== 2000 to 2023 ===
As of 2021, the population of Pflugerville continues to grow rapidly, reaching a total of 66,884.

== Geography ==
Pflugerville is 14 miles (23 km) northeast of downtown Austin along FM 1825 (Pecan Street) in northern Travis County. It is 15 miles (24 km) northeast of the Colorado River.

According to the 2010 United States Census Bureau, the city has a total land area of 22.32 square miles. It has 40.39 square miles in the extraterritorial jurisdiction. The city has one body of water, Lake Pflugerville, created in 2005 to serve as a water reservoir and recreation area, and two creeks, Gilleland Creek and Wilbarger Creek. A local school group, Wilbarger Water Watchers, in association with the LCRA, monitors the waters of Wilbarger Creek to ensure it meets the United States Environmental Protection Agency's national standard.

== Demographics ==
Historical population
Census	Pop.	Note	%±
1970	549		—
1980	745		35.7%
1990	4,444		496.5%
2000	16,335		267.6%
2010	46,936		187.3%
2020	65,191		38.9%
2021 (est.)	66,884		2.6%
U.S. Decennial Census

=== 2020 census ===
As of the 2020 census, Pflugerville had a population of 65,191 and 23,087 households. There were 16,615 families residing in the city. The median age was 35.6 years; 24.9% of residents were under the age of 18 and 10.0% of residents were 65 years of age or older. For every 100 females there were 94.9 males, and for every 100 females age 18 and over there were 91.9 males age 18 and over.

99.4% of residents lived in urban areas, while 0.6% lived in rural areas.

Of the 23,087 households, 38.8% had children under the age of 18 living in them. Of all households, 53.7% were married-couple households, 14.8% were households with a male householder and no spouse or partner present, and 24.3% were households with a female householder and no spouse or partner present. About 20.6% of all households were made up of individuals and 5.8% had someone living alone who was 65 years of age or older.

There were 23,985 housing units, of which 3.7% were vacant. The homeowner vacancy rate was 0.8% and the rental vacancy rate was 6.7%.

Racial composition as of the 2020 census
Race	Number	Percent
White	30,659	47.0%
Black or African American	10,015	15.4%
American Indian and Alaska Native	585	0.9%
Asian	5,523	8.5%
Native Hawaiian and Other Pacific Islander	112	0.2%
Some other race	6,354	9.7%
Two or more races	11,943	18.3%
Hispanic or Latino (of any race)	20,323	31.2%

=== 2010 Census ===
As of the census of 2010, there were 46,936 people, 15,789 households, and 12,260 families residing in the city. The population density was 2,102.8 inhabitants per square mile (811.9/km^{2}). There were 16,418 housing units at an average density of 736.2 per square mile (284.2/km^{2}). The racial makeup of the city was 64.1% White, 15.5% African American, 0.6% Native American, 7.4% Asian, 0.1% Pacific Islander, 8.6% from other races, and 3.6% from two or more races. Hispanic or Latino people of any race were 27.7% of the population.

There were 15,789 households, out of which 45.0% had children under the age of 18 living with them, 59.4% were married couples living together, 13.4% had a female householder with no husband present, and 22.4% were non-families. Of all households 17.0% were made up of individuals, and 4.2% had someone living alone who was 65 years of age or older. The average household size was 2.96 and the average family size was 3.35.

In the city, the population was spread out, with 30.6% under the age of 18, 6.9% from 18 to 24, 32.4% from 25 to 44, 24.0% from 45 to 64, and 6.0% who were 65 years of age or older. The median age was 33.8 years. For every 100 females, there were 93.9 males. For every 100 females age 18 and over, there were 89.2 males.

According to the U.S. Census Bureau's 2008-2012 American Community Survey 5-Year Estimates, the median income for a household in the city was $75,119, and the median income for a family was $84,449. Males had a median income of $53,670 versus $46,451 for females. The per capita income for the city was $29,995. About 6.6% of families and 9.0% of the population were below the poverty line, including 12.5% of those under age 18 and 3.5% of those age 65 or over.

=== 2000 Census ===
By comparison, the census of 2000 reported 16,335 people, 5,146 households, and 4,425 families residing in the city. The population density was 1,440.6 inhabitants per square mile (556.2/km^{2}). There were 5,239 housing units at an average density of 462.0 per square mile (178.4/km^{2}). The racial makeup of the city was 77.18% White, 9.46% African American, 0.24% Native American, 4.31% Asian, 0.09% Pacific Islander, 5.99% from other races, and 2.74% from two or more races. Hispanic or Latino people of any race were 16.69% of the population.

There were 5,146 households, out of which 56.4% had children under the age of 18 living with them, 72.4% were married couples living together, 10.4% had a female householder with no husband present, and 14.0% were non-families. Of all households 10.1% were made up of individuals, and 1.7% had someone living alone who was 65 years of age or older. The average household size was 3.15 and the average family size was 3.39.

In the city, the population was spread out, with 34.6% under the age of 18, 6.0% from 18 to 24, 38.8% from 25 to 44, 16.9% from 45 to 64, and 3.7% who were 65 years of age or older. The median age was 32 years. For every 100 females, there were 97.3 males. For every 100 females age 18 and over, there were 93.6 males age 18 and over.

The median income for a household in the city was $71,985, and the median income for a family was $73,629. Males had a median income of $49,989 versus $32,188 for females. The per capita income for the city was $26,226. About 1.7% of families and 1.7% of the population were below the poverty line, including 2.1% of those under age 18 and 1.3% of those age 65 or over.

== Economy and transportation ==
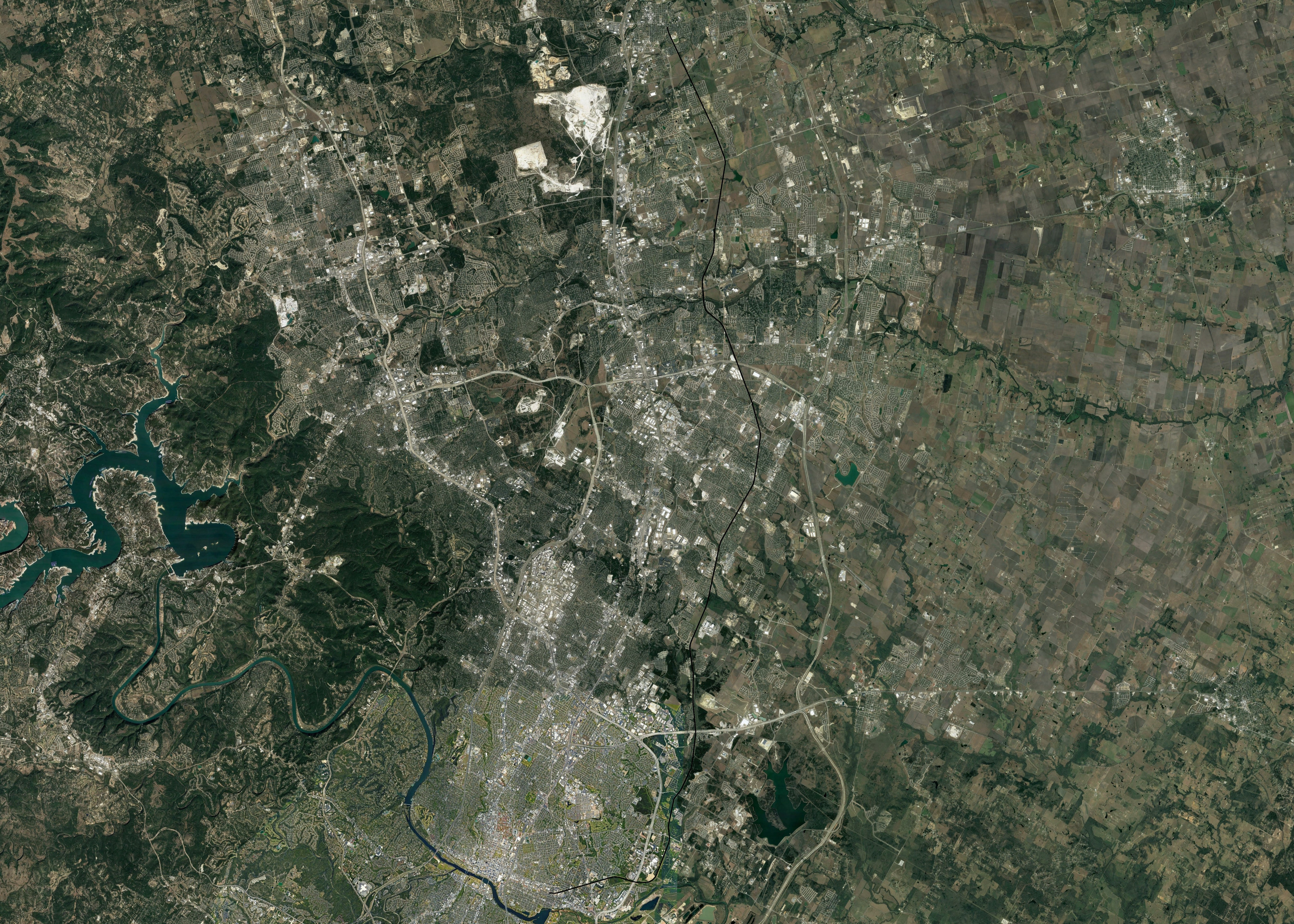
Mokan Corridor, from Austin to Georgetown, Texas

In response to a recent influx of higher sales tax revenue, the City Council lowered the property tax rate annually from 2003 to 2014. In 2015 an increase in the property tax rate was announced for the first time in more than a decade, to pay for $53 million in transportation and park bond projects approved by voters in a 2014 bond election.

While a mile-long stretch of Interstate 35 is often said by local media and residents to be in Pflugerville, the city of Austin actually controls this land, either as part of the city or through its extraterritorial jurisdiction. In November 2006, the first parts of a central Texas tollway system opened, including State Highway 130 and State Highway 45, increasing accessibility to Pflugerville. Approximately three miles of 130 run through Pflugerville, including the intersection of 45 and 130.

One such development, Stone Hill Town Center, has opened, and includes retailers, a movie theater and a St. David's HealthCare 24-hour emergency care facility. With its close proximity to the Austin Executive Airport and SH 130, the connectivity of the area is attracting businesses and bringing jobs to Pflugerville.

Before the Stone Hill development and the nearby Pfluger Crossing (a development that includes a Walmart Supercenter) opened their first stores in 2007, the city's two largest retailers were an Albertsons grocery store (which operated from 1996 to 2006) near Pflugerville High School and an H-E-B grocery store (operating since 2000) east of downtown.

=== Pflugerville Community Development Corporation ===
The Pflugerville Community Development Corporation (PCDC) has overseen economic development for the city since late 2009 as a Texas 4B Economic Development Corporation that collects a one-half cent sales tax on taxable goods purchased in the City of Pflugerville for the purpose of promoting economic development. The PCDC is a separate entity that reports to City Council.

In 2010, RRE Austin Solar broke ground on what will be one of the nation's largest solar farms, the 60 MW Pflugerville Solar Farm, but as of July 2013 no significant construction had begun.

PCDC has helped to develop the 130 Commerce Center, at the corner of State Highway 130 and Pecan (FM 1825), an office park with FedEx, TrackingPoint, Community Impact Newspaper, and D-bats, as well as two hotels and a conference center anticipated in 2016. EOS and Medway Plastics are planned tenants.

On August 6, 2013, the city agreed on a development deal with Harvest Family Entertainment to build the sixth and largest Hawaiian Falls water park just south of the intersection of State Highway 130 and State Highway 45 across from Stone Hill Town Center. The proposed $21 million endeavor would consist of a 15-acre water park along with a 5-acre adventure park that would become the largest water park in the company. Hawaiian Falls Pflugerville opened in June 2014. The operator of Hawaiian Falls water and adventure parks defaulted on the October 2015 payment for Hawaiian Falls Pflugerville, and requested a deferment. The operator caught up with payments by December 18, 2015, but again defaulted on lease payments beginning in September 2016. The city began negotiations with Typhoon Texas to take over the water park lease.

In 2020, Amazon began construction on a distribution center in Pflugerville. The distribution center has been reported to bring 1,000 full-time jobs and be one of the largest distribution centers in the state. In partnership, the City Council signed an agreement in which Amazon agrees to invest $250M and create 1,000 fulltime jobs and the Pflugerville Community Development Corporation will use money earmarked for economic development to make additional roadway and intersection improvements along FM 1825/Pecan St to support the project.

Curative, Inc. opened a lab in Pflugerville in 2020 bringing hundreds of jobs. The company processes COVID-19 testing results.

== Parks and recreation ==
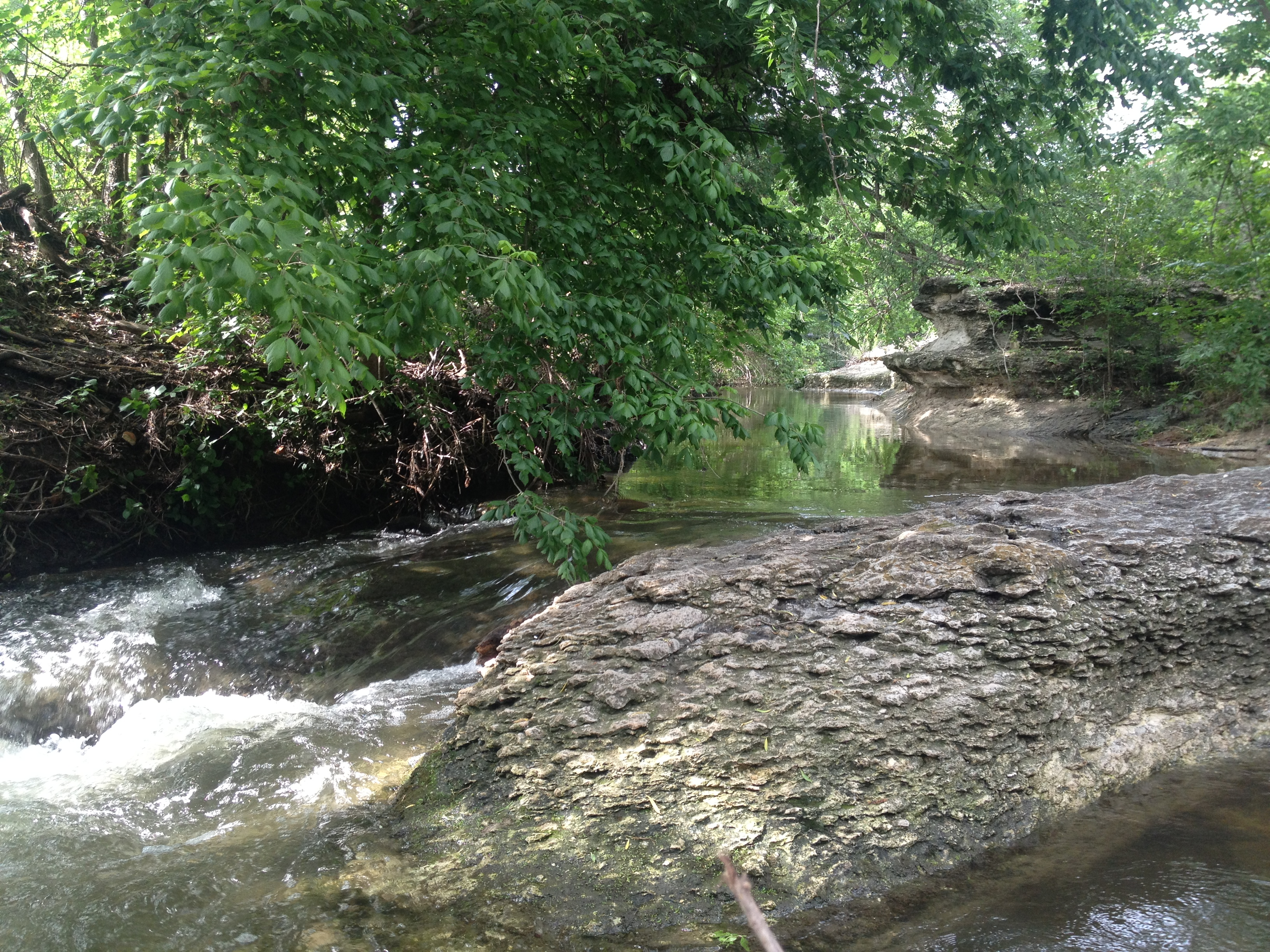
Gilleland Creek

There are 28 developed parks, over 40 miles (64 km) of trails, 500 acres (200 ha) of parks and 528 acres of open space within Pflugerville's city limits. Many of the parks offer a full range of amenities from pavilions, gazebos and playgrounds to pools and picnic areas.

Pfluger Park is along Gilleland Creek and is the site of the city's annual German festival, the Deutschen Pfest, held the third weekend in October. The park includes the Fallen Warrior Memorial, trails, a grove, playground, volleyball courts, basketball court, picnic areas and large shade trees. Pfluger Park is also used for music events and festivals.

Lake Pflugerville is a 180-acre (73 ha) reservoir built to provide the citizens of Pflugerville with drinking water. It is open for fishing, swimming, jogging, canoes, kayaks and wind surfing. Lake Pflugerville Park includes a three-mile walking/jogging trail, playground, boat launch, pavilion and beach area.

The Northeast Metro Skate/BMX Park opened on September 18, 2012, near Pflugerville. The 349-acre (141 ha) Northeast Metropolitan Park is a multiple-use recreational area with soccer fields, multi-use fields, baseball fields, a cricket field, basketball court, tennis court, and a skate park. Amenities include restrooms, playgrounds, group shelters, picnic tables with grills, concession building for rent, and a water play area.

Hawaiian Falls opened a water park and adventure park in Pflugerville on Memorial Day weekend, 2014. The water park is now known as Typhoon Texas. Typhoon Texas has celebrated more than 3 seasons in Pflugerville and recently opened a new restaurant, The Patio entertainment venue.

In 2015, the city purchased a 237-acre (96 ha) tract of land for a community park with a new sports complex and nature areas for $4.276 million. The first phase opened of 1849 Park with soccer fields for local league play and soccer fields.

In 2023, the city announced itself as the Trail Capital of Texas and is working toward the official designation. Based on the Parks and Open Space Master Plan, the emerged theme was trails as a true amenity in the city.

== Infrastructure ==
Pflugerville has a municipal animal shelter. In November 2015 there was a referendum for a bond for a new animal shelter, but voters did not pass it, with 53% of voters going against it. In 2016 the city government considered closing its municipal shelter and joining the Williamson County Regional Animal Shelter. Instead the city continued using a municipal shelter. In 2026 the city council chose a proposed site for a new shelter.

== Education ==
Public education in Pflugerville in the vast majority of the city is provided by the Pflugerville Independent School District (PfISD). The district encompasses all or part of six municipalities, including Pflugerville, Austin, Coupland, Hutto, Manor and Round Rock.

Pflugerville ISD serves over 25,000 students on 35 campuses, including four high schools (Pflugerville, Connally, Hendrickson, and Weiss), seven middle schools, 22 elementary schools, and two alternative schools.

Small parts of Pflugerville lie within the Round Rock Independent School District and the Manor Independent School District.

== Notable people ==
- Dylan Gandy, a former American Football player who won a Super Bowl with the Indianapolis Colts in 2007, attended Pflugerville High School where he lettered in football and track & field.
- Michael Johnson, a former American football safety who won a Super Bowl with the New York Giants in 2008, attended Pflugerville High School where he played both football and basketball
- Alex Okafor, an American football player for the Kansas City Chiefs of the National Football League, attended Pflugerville High School and in November 2020 announced a sponsorship with the PfISD education program
- Samaje Perine, an American football running back for the Cincinnati Bengals of the National Football League (NFL), attended Hendrickson High School in Pflugerville
- Eugene Lee Yang, Korean-American filmmaker, actor, and internet celebrity, best known for his work with BuzzFeed (2013–2018) and The Try Guys (2018–2024)

== In popular culture ==
- Texas Chainsaw Massacre: The Next Generation was filmed at an abandoned farmhouse in Pflugerville.
- Transformers: Age of Extinction had scenes filmed in one of Pflugerville's 100-year-old houses in 2013
- The 1993 feature film What's Eating Gilbert Grape had scenes filmed in Pflugerville
