= Plowman (surname) =

Plowman is an occupational surname based on plowman, the user of a plow. Notable people with the surname include:

- Anna-Louise Plowman (born c. 1972), New Zealand actress
- Arthur J. Plowman (1872–1942), American politician
- Sir Anthony Plowman (1905–1993) Vice-Chancellor of the High Court
- Clifford Henry Fitzherbert Plowman (1889–1948), British diplomat and Colonial Service administrator
- Idora Plowman (1843–1929), American author
- Jacob H. Plowman (1836–1897), American politician
- Jon Plowman (born 1953), British television producer
- Jonathan Plowman Jr. (1717–1795), American revolutionary
- Mark Plowman (The Messengers), fictional character
- Max Plowman (1883–1941), British writer and pacifist
- Piers Plowman, English allegorical narrative poem by William Langland and its title character
- Thomas S. Plowman (1843–1919), American politician
- Timothy Plowman (1944–1989), American botanist
- Tony Plowman (born 1939), Australian politician
- Vincent Plowman, fictional character
