= Chase Griffin =

American football player (born 2000)

No. 11
- Position: Quarterback

Personal information
- Born: September 12, 2000 (age 26); Santa Monica, California
- Listed height: 5 ft 10 in (1.78 m)
- Listed weight: 190 lb (86 kg)

Career information
- High school: Hutto High School (Hutto, TX)
- College: UCLA (2019–2024)
- Stats at ESPN

Chase James Seaton Griffin (born September 12, 2000) is an American football quarterback. He played college football for the UCLA Bruins. Chase Griffin is a 2x winner of national NIL Male Athlete of the Year awards from the NIL Summit and Opendorse.

== Early life ==
Griffin was born on September 12, 2000, at UCLA Medical Center, Santa Monica. As an eighth grader in 2014, he was touted as a "13-year-old prodigy" in an ESPN article titled The QB most likely to succeed. He attended Hutto High School in Hutto, Texas. A three-star recruit, Griffin passed for 4,051 passing yards and 51 touchdowns as a senior, and he also rushed for 415 yards and eight touchdowns. He was named Texas Gatorade Player of the Year. On June 16, 2018, Griffin committed to the University of California, Los Angeles to play college football; he also had offers from five Ivy League universities.

== College career ==
=== Redshirt freshman season ===
After redshirting the 2019 campaign, Griffin saw his first game action for UCLA in the 2020 season. Griffin saw his first start against the No. 11 Oregon Ducks after starting quarterback Dorian Thompson-Robinson was sidelined due to COVID-19 contact tracing protocols. In his first collegiate start, Griffin completed 19 of 31 passes and passed for a touchdown, but the Bruins ultimately lost to the Ducks, 38–35. The next week, Griffin picked up his first win as a starting collegiate quarterback, leading the Bruins to a 27–10 victory over Arizona with 129 yards passing and a touchdown. In the season finale against Stanford, Griffin was again called into action when Thompson-Robinson went down with a knee injury. Griffin had his best performance of the season, completing 9 of 11 passes for four touchdowns against the Cardinal in what was ultimately a 48–47 loss in double overtime.

=== College career statistics ===
Season	Team	GP	Passing								Rushing			
Season	Team	GP	Cmp	Att	Pct	Yds	Y/A	TD	Int	Rtg	Att	Yds	Avg	TD
2020	UCLA	4	40	62	64.5	451	7.3	6	2	151.1	18	40	2.2	0
Career		4	40	62	64.5	451	7.3	6	2	151.1	18	40	2.2	0

== Personal life ==
Griffin has two younger siblings. His parents are Christine and William Griffin.
