= Bagdad, Texas =

Ghost town in Texas, US

Bagdad
- Ghost town
- Location in Texas
- Coordinates: 30.57658310°N 97.86973560°W
- Country: United States
- State: Texas
- County: Williamson

Bagdad is a ghost town in Williamson County, Texas, United States. Situated by Brushy Creek, its first settler and surveyor, Charles Babcock—owned a local inn—named it for his hometown of Bagdad, Tennessee. Established in 1854, the community peaked in the 1860s and the 1870s, with a post office operating there from 1855 to 1882. The town declined after being bypassed by the Austin and Northwestern Railroad in 1882, for nearby Leander. The community was dispersed by 1900, being abandoned during the 20th century.
