= Coupland, Texas =

Coupland
- city
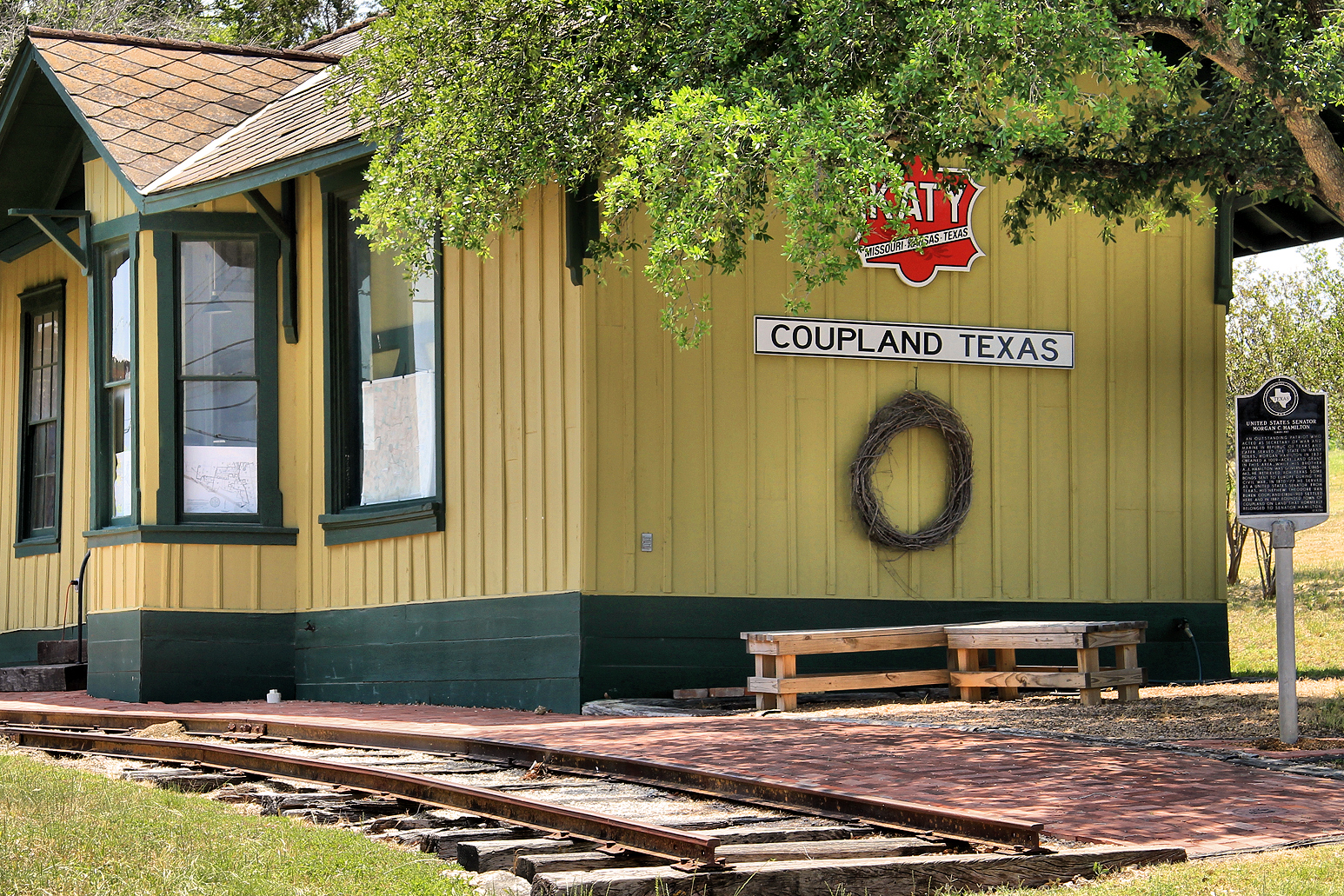
- Former train station in Coupland

- Location within the state of Texas Coupland (the United States)
- Coordinates: 30°27′25″N 97°23′33″W
- Country: United States
- State: Texas
- County: Williamson, Travis

Area
  - Total: 1.95 sq mi (5.06 km^{2})
  - Land: 1.93 sq mi (4.99 km^{2})
  - Water: 0.027 sq mi (0.07 km^{2})
- Elevation: 512 ft (156 m)

Population (2020)
  - Total: 289
  - Density: 150/sq mi (57.9/km^{2})
- Time zone: UTC-6 (Central (CST))
  - Summer (DST): UTC-5 (CDT)
- ZIP codes: 78615
- Area codes: 512, 737
- FIPS code: 17312
- GNIS feature ID: 1355183
- Website: http://www.cityofcouplandtx.us/

Coupland (/ˈkoʊplənd/ KOHP-lənd) is a city in southeastern Williamson County, Texas, United States. According to the 2020 census, its population was 289.

The Coupland Independent School District serves area students. Coupland ISD serves kindergarten through grade 8. Upon graduation, the students go to Elgin, Pflugerville, or Taylor, Texas for high school courses. Coupland's athletic teams are the "Cowboys".

== History ==
In 1859, Morgan C. Hamilton bought large tracts of land along Brushy Creek from Shiloh to Rice's Crossing. Hamilton died in 1883, willing the land to his nephew, Theodore Van Buren Coupland. Mr. Coupland sold a 100-ft right-of-way to the Taylor, Bastrop and Austin Railroad in 1887. Two Taylor men subsequently formed the Coupland City Corporation to subdivide and sell land for the newly formed unincorporated community of Coupland.

Coupland residents voted overwhelmingly to incorporate on November 6, 2012, the 125th anniversary of its founding. The City of Coupland held its first city council elections on May 13, 2013, with Jack Piper running unopposed for mayor.

Williamson County Emergency Services District No. 10 operates as the Coupland VFD. The department was established in 1979 and serves Coupland and the surrounding district.

== Geography ==
Coupland is located at 30°27′25″N 97°23′33″W (30.456924, –97.392367), which is just south of the city of Taylor, just east of the city of Pflugerville, and north of the city of Manor.

According to the United States Census Bureau, the city has a total land area of 1.926 square miles (4.989 km^{2}) and a total water area of 0.026 sq mi (0.067 km^{2}).

== Demographics ==
Historical population
Census	Pop.	Note	%±
2020	289		—
U.S. Decennial Census

=== 2020 census ===
As of the 2020 census, Coupland had a population of 289. The median age was 45.8 years. 23.5% of residents were under the age of 18 and 21.1% of residents were 65 years of age or older. For every 100 females there were 106.4 males, and for every 100 females age 18 and over there were 108.5 males age 18 and over.

0.0% of residents lived in urban areas, while 100.0% lived in rural areas.

There were 115 households in Coupland, of which 37.4% had children under the age of 18 living in them. Of all households, 47.0% were married-couple households, 22.6% were households with a male householder and no spouse or partner present, and 20.0% were households with a female householder and no spouse or partner present. About 13.9% of all households were made up of individuals and 8.6% had someone living alone who was 65 years of age or older.

There were 123 housing units, of which 6.5% were vacant. The homeowner vacancy rate was 3.1% and the rental vacancy rate was 8.7%.

Racial composition as of the 2020 census
Race	Number	Percent
White	232	80.3%
Black or African American	5	1.7%
American Indian and Alaska Native	4	1.4%
Asian	1	0.3%
Native Hawaiian and Other Pacific Islander	0	0.0%
Some other race	30	10.4%
Two or more races	17	5.9%
Hispanic or Latino (of any race)	69	23.9%
