= Les Peterson (American football) =

American football player (1908–1989)

No. 9, 29, 18, 43
- Position: Wide receiver

Personal information
- Born: June 27, 1908; Taylor, Texas, U.S.
- Died: May 30, 1989 (aged 80)
- Listed height: 6 ft 3 in (1.91 m)
- Listed weight: 206 lb (93 kg)

Career information
- High school: Taylor (TX)
- College: Texas

Career history
- Portsmouth Spartans (1931); Green Bay Packers (1932); Staten Island Stapletons (1932); Brooklyn Dodgers (1933); Green Bay Packers (1934)

Awards and highlights
- 1930 Southwest Conference Champion

Career statistics
- Games played: 44
- Receptions: 21
- Receiving Yards: 358
- Stats at Pro Football Reference

Carl Lester Peterson (June 20, 1908 – May 30, 1989) was an American football player who played four seasons in the National Football League. He played at the collegiate level at the University of Texas at Austin. He attended Taylor High School.

Peterson was a 2-year letterman at Texas where he helped the Longhorns win the 1930 Southwest Conference Championship.
