= Coupland Independent School District =

School district in Texas, United States

Address
- 620 South Commerce Coupland, Texas, 78615; United States

District information
- Grades: PK–8
- Schools: 1
- NCES District ID: 4815420

Students and staff
- Students: 296 (2023–2024)
- Teachers: 24.95 (on an FTE basis)
- Student–teacher ratio: 11.86:1

Other information
- Website: www.couplandisd.org

Coupland Independent School District is a public school district based in the community of Coupland, Texas (USA).

Located in Williamson County, a very small portion of the district extends into Travis County.

Coupland ISD has one school, Coupland Elementary, that serves students in grades kindergarten through eight, and recently passed a bond to build a new Middle School opening in 2026. Students in grades nine through twelve attend Taylor High School in the Taylor Independent School District. In 1997, the Coupland School's Gym was used for scenes in the movie Home Fries.

The district had 296 students in the 2023-2024 school year.

In 2009, the school district was rated "recognized" by the Texas Education Agency.

== Schools ==
- Coupland Jr High & High School
- Coupland Elementary School
