= Hutto Independent School District =

School district in Texas, United States

Address
- 200 College Street Hutto, Texas, USA

District information
- Type: Independent School District
- Motto: Inspiring Excellence
- Grades: PK-12
- Established: March 18, 1918; 108 years ago
- Superintendent: Jeni Neatherlin
- Governing agency: Texas Education Agency
- Schools: 15
- NCES District ID: 4824100

Students and staff
- Students: 11,1101 (2025-26)
- District mascot: Hippos
- Colors: Orange & White

Other information
- Website: www.hipponation.org

Hutto Independent School District (Hutto ISD or HISD) is a public school district based in Hutto, Texas, United States. Covering 75 square miles in Williamson County, the district serves the City of Hutto and its surrounding unincorporated areas, as well as portions of Round Rock and Taylor.

As of 2026, Hutto ISD operates 13 campuses, including 2 high schools, 3 middle schools, 8 elementary schools, and 1 alternative campus, as well as a virtual academy. The district most recently received a "C" rating from the Texas Education Agency (TEA).

== History ==
Hutto Independent School District was established on March 18, 1918.

The current Hutto High School campus opened in 1999 with grades 6-12. Hutto Middle School (grades 6-8) shared the high school facility. Hutto Elementary School operated with grades PK-5.

In 2003, Hutto Primary School opened with PK-2, leaving HES with 3-5. 2004 saw HMS receive its own campus.

Cottonwood Creek Elementary School opened in 2005, resulting in Hutto Primary becoming Nadine Johnson Elementary School and all 3 elementary campuses housing grades PK-5. Ray Elementary School followed in 2007.

HISD opened 2 new campuses in 2008: Farley Middle School and Veterans Hill Elementary School. In 2010, the district surpassed an enrollment of 5,000 students.

Due to a decrease in state funding, HISD underwent budget cuts in 2012 and shut down Veterans Hill ES. As a result, 5th grade was relocated from elementary campuses to the middle schools as the district shifted to a PK-4 and 5-8 grade configuration. The district returned 5th grade to the elementary level in 2014, as enough growth occurred for Veterans Hill to reopen.

In 2016, Howard Norman Elementary School opened. Benjamin "Doc" Kerley Elementary School followed in 2019, the same year Hutto ISD surpassed an enrollment of 7,500 students. Hutto 9th Grade Center opened in 2021, with HHS reconfiguring to grades 10-11.

HISD surpassed 10,000 total students in 2023. Gus Almquist Middle School opened in 2024 with a capacity of 1,200 students, with Lee Martinez Elementary School following in 2025.

In 2027, the 9th Grade Center will be converted into Creekside High School, opening with either 9-10 or 9-11 students living north of U.S. 79.

== School Rankings in Texas (as of 2015) ==
- Hutto High School 784/1226
- Farley Middle School 469/1802
- Hutto Middle School 1018/1802

== Schools ==
=== Secondary schools ===
Secondary schools
Name	Grades	Established	Additional Information
Hutto High School	10-12	1999	Current campus opened in 1999
Hutto 9th Grade Center	9	2021	Will transition into Creekside HS with grades 9-10 in 2027
Gus Almquist Middle School	6-8	2024	
Farley Middle School	6-8	2008	
Hutto Middle School	6-8	2004	

=== Primary schools ===
Primary schools
Name	Grades	Established	Additional Information
Cottonwood Creek Elementary School	PK-5	2006	
Hutto Elementary School	PK-5	1980	
Nadine Johnson Elementary School	PK-5	2003	Formerly Hutto Primary School
Benjamin "Doc" Kerley Elementary School	PK-5	2019	
Lee Martinez Elementary School	PK-5	2025	
Howard Norman Elementary School	PK-5	2016	
Ray Elementary School	PK-5	2007	
Veterans Hill Elementary School	PK-5	2008	Closed from 2012-14
