= Jeremy Kerley =

American football player (born 1988)

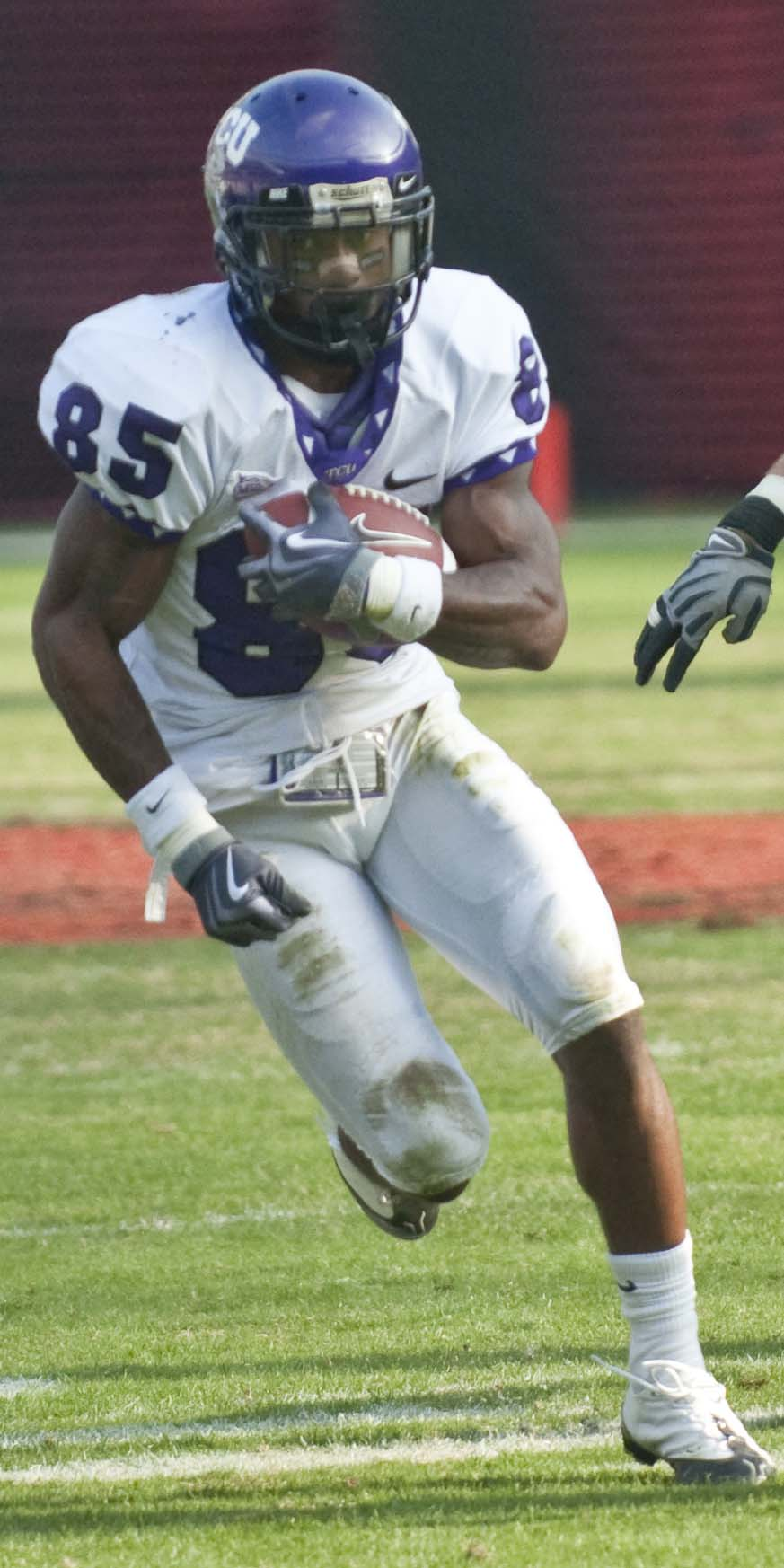
- Kerley with TCU in 2009

No. 10, 11, 14, 17
- Positions: Wide receiver Return specialist

Personal information
- Born: November 8, 1988 (age 37); Hutto, Texas, U.S.
- Listed height: 5 ft 9 in (1.75 m)
- Listed weight: 188 lb (85 kg)

Career information
- High school: Hutto
- College: TCU (2007–2010)
- NFL draft: 2011: 5th round, 153rd overall pick

Career history
- New York Jets (2011–2015); Detroit Lions (2016)*; San Francisco 49ers (2016); New York Jets (2017); Buffalo Bills (2018)
- * Offseason or practice squad member only

Awards and highlights
- NCAA punt return yards leader (2009); 2× MW Special Teams Player of the Year (2009, 2010); 3× First-team All-MW (2008–2010) (Note: Selected as a first-team return specialist and a second-team wide receiver in 2010.); Second-team All-MW (2010)

Career NFL statistics
- Receptions: 270
- Receiving yards: 3,116
- Rushing yards: 133
- Return yards: 1,581
- Total touchdowns: 14
- Stats at Pro Football Reference

Jeremy Dashon Kerley (born November 8, 1988) is an American former professional football player who was a wide receiver and return specialist in the National Football League (NFL). He played college football for the TCU Horned Frogs and was selected by the New York Jets in the fifth round of the 2011 NFL draft. Kerley was also a member of the Detroit Lions, San Francisco 49ers, and Buffalo Bills.

== Early life ==
Kerley was born to Charlotte and Donald Kerley on November 8, 1988, in Hutto, Texas. He attended Hutto High School in Hutto, Texas, where he was a letterman in four sports. Kerley took his high school football team to the state finals in 2005 where they faced Tatum High School and lost by three points despite his great game performance. Kerley's letterman included football and baseball. He played pitcher and centerfielder in baseball. At quarterback, Kerley led his football team to its first state championship game as a junior.

As a standout track athlete, Kerley was one of the state's top performers in the jumping events. He was a four-time state finalist in the triple jump. Kerley qualified for the state track meet in the long jump (7.26 m) and triple jump (14.76 m), winning silver medals in both events. He was also a member of the 4 × 100 m and 4 × 400 m relay teams.

Kerley was recruited by the University of Texas and Stanford University to play baseball, and by the University of Oklahoma to play football. However, he ultimately decided to play college football for Texas Christian University.

== College career ==
Kerley was converted to wide receiver and return specialist at TCU after playing quarterback in high school. Following the 2009 season, he was named Mountain West Conference Special Teams Player of the Year after breaking the conference record for punt return yards in a season with an NCAA-leading 563 yards.

In 2010, Kerley had 10 touchdown catches, a touchdown pass, and two rushing touchdowns. He ranked second in the nation in punt returns and third in the nation in kickoff returns. Kerley was named the Mountain West Conference Special Teams Player of the Year for the second consecutive year in 2010, as well as second-team All-Mountain West honors at wide receiver. He was one of three finalists in 2010 for the Paul Hornung Award, which honors the most versatile college football player in the nation.

== Professional career ==
=== Pre-draft ===
Kerley was projected to be drafted in the fifth round of the 2011 NFL draft.

Pre-draft measurables
Height	Weight	Arm length	Hand span	Wingspan	40-yard dash	10-yard split	20-yard split	20-yard shuttle	Three-cone drill	Vertical jump	Broad jump	Bench press
5 ft 9 1/2 in (1.77 m)	189 lb (86 kg)	30 in (0.76 m)	9 in (0.23 m)	6 ft 1 1/4 in (1.86 m)	4.56 s	1.54 s	2.64 s	3.99 s	6.70 s	37.5 in (0.95 m)	10 ft 2 in (3.10 m)	16 reps
All values from NFL Combine/Pro Day

=== New York Jets (first stint) ===
Kerley was selected in the fifth round (153rd overall) of the 2011 NFL Draft by the New York Jets. He caught his first career touchdown from Mark Sanchez against the New England Patriots on October 9, 2011.

During the season-opener against the Buffalo Bills, Kerley recorded his first career punt return touchdown. During Week 16 after Tim Tebow requested to be removed from the wildcat formation, Kerley took his place, and threw a 42-yard pass, though the Jets lost to the San Diego Chargers 27–17.

On October 21, 2014, Kerley agreed to a four-year, $16 million contract extension with $5.4 million guaranteed.

Kerley finished the 2015 season with career-highs in punt returns (48) and punt return yards (411).

On March 9, 2016, Kerley was released by the Jets.

=== Detroit Lions ===
On March 21, 2016, Kerley signed a one-year deal with the Detroit Lions.

=== San Francisco 49ers ===
On August 29, 2016, the Lions traded Kerley to the San Francisco 49ers in exchange for guard Brandon Thomas. He led San Francisco in receiving during the regular season, logging 64 receptions for 667 yards and a career-high three touchdowns.

Kerley agreed to a three-year, $10.5 million contract extension on March 4, 2017. He was released by the 49ers on September 2, as a part of final roster cuts.

=== New York Jets (second stint) ===
On September 5, 2017, Kerley re-signed with the New York Jets on a one-year contract. On November 6, he was suspended for four games due to a PED violation. Kerley was released by the Jets on December 18 after being reinstated from suspension.

=== Buffalo Bills ===
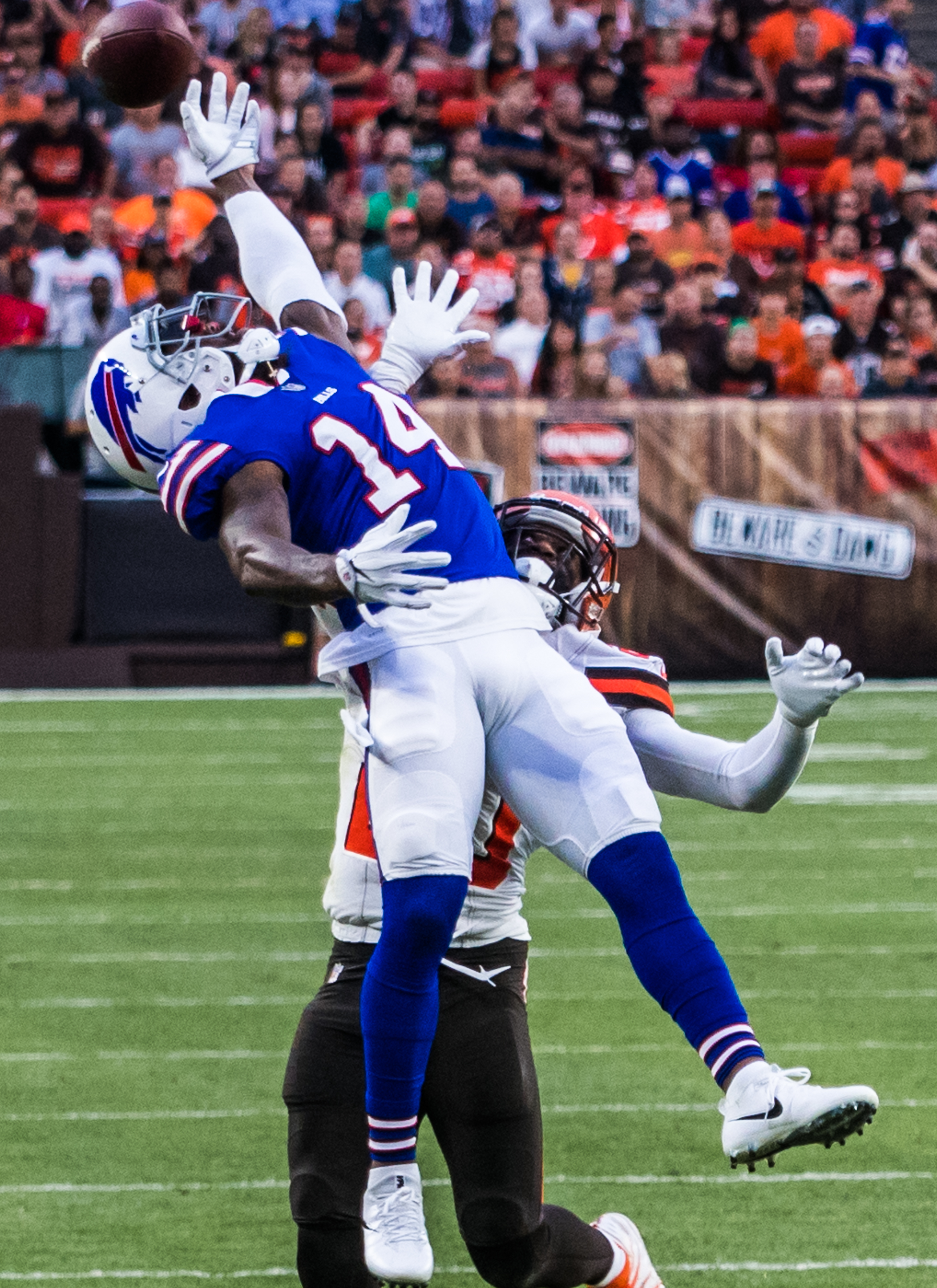
Kerley in 2018

On April 16, 2018, Kerley signed a one-year contract with the Buffalo Bills. He was released by Buffalo on September 15.

== NFL career statistics ==
Legend
	Led the league
**Bold**	Career high

Year	Team	Games		Receiving					Rushing					Returning					Fumbles	
Year	Team	GP	GS	Rec	Yds	Avg	Lng	TD	Att	Yds	Avg	Lng	TD	Ret	Yds	Avg	Lng	TD	Fum	Lost
2011	NYJ	14	1	29	314	10.8	38	1	**5**	28	5.6	16	0	30	332	**11.1**	53	0	3	1
2012	NYJ	**16**	7	56	**827**	**14.8**	**66**	2	**5**	8	1.6	5	0	19	208	10.9	**68T**	**1**	**4**	**3**
2013	NYJ	12	8	43	523	12.2	26	**3**	4	11	2.8	8	0	14	134	9.6	24	0	0	0
2014	NYJ	**16**	8	38	409	10.8	33	1	4	**86**	**21.5**	**37**	0	26	211	8.1	41	0	1	0
2015	NYJ	**16**	1	16	152	9.5	25	2	—	—	—	—	—	**48**	**411**	8.6	58	0	1	0
2016	SF	**16**	**13**	**64**	667	10.4	33	**3**	—	—	—	—	—	23	190	8.3	26	0	**4**	1
2017	NYJ	8	2	22	217	9.9	31	1	—	—	—	—	—	16	85	5.3	15	0	3	2
2018	BUF	1	1	2	7	3.5	7	0	—	—	—	—	—	2	10	5.0	6	0	0	0
Career		99	40	270	3,116	11.5	66	13	18	133	7.4	37	0	178	1,581	8.9	68T	1	16	7

== Personal life ==
Kerley and his wife, Kristal Juarez, have three children: Dae'shon, Y'manni, and Ma'liyah. Kerley's younger cousin is Olympic silver-medalist sprinter and 2022 World Athletics Champion Fred Kerley.
