= Taylor High School (Taylor, Texas) =

Location
- 3101 N Main St. Taylor, Texas 76574-1298; United States
- Coordinates: 30°35′37″N 97°24′52″W

Information
- School type: Public high school
- School district: Taylor Independent School District
- Principal: Andrew Maddox
- Teaching staff: 70.24 (FTE)
- Grades: 9–12
- Enrollment: 853 (2025–2026)
- Student to teacher ratio: 13.14
- Colors: Green; White
- Athletics conference: UIL Class 4A
- Mascot: Duck
- Yearbook: Mallard
- Website: Official website

Taylor High School is a public high school located in Taylor, Texas, United States. It is part of the Taylor Independent School District located in east central Williamson County and classified as a 4A school by the University Interscholastic League (UIL). In 2015, the school was rated "Met Standard" by the Texas Education Agency.

== Athletics ==
The Taylor Ducks compete in these sports -

Cross Country, Volleyball, Football, Basketball, Powerlifting, Soccer, Golf, Tennis, Track, Softball & Baseball

=== State titles ===
Taylor (UIL)

- Baseball -
  - 1969(3A), 1972(3A)
- Boys Track -
  - 1961(2A), 1966(2A)

Taylor Price (PVIL)

- Football -
  - 1947(PVIL-1A)^, 1962(PVIL-1A)

^Co-champions

==== State finalists ====
Taylor (UIL)

- Baseball -
  - 1971(3A)

Taylor Hughes (PVIL)

- Boys Basketball -
  - 1966 (PVIL-1A)

== Notable alumni ==
- Fred Kerley, world-class sprinter, silver medalist at the 2020 Tokyo Olympics (held in July/August 2021), bronze medalist at the 2024 Paris Olympics
- Dicky Moegle, former NFL player
- Les Peterson, former NFL player
- Rip Torn, actor
