= Hutto High School =

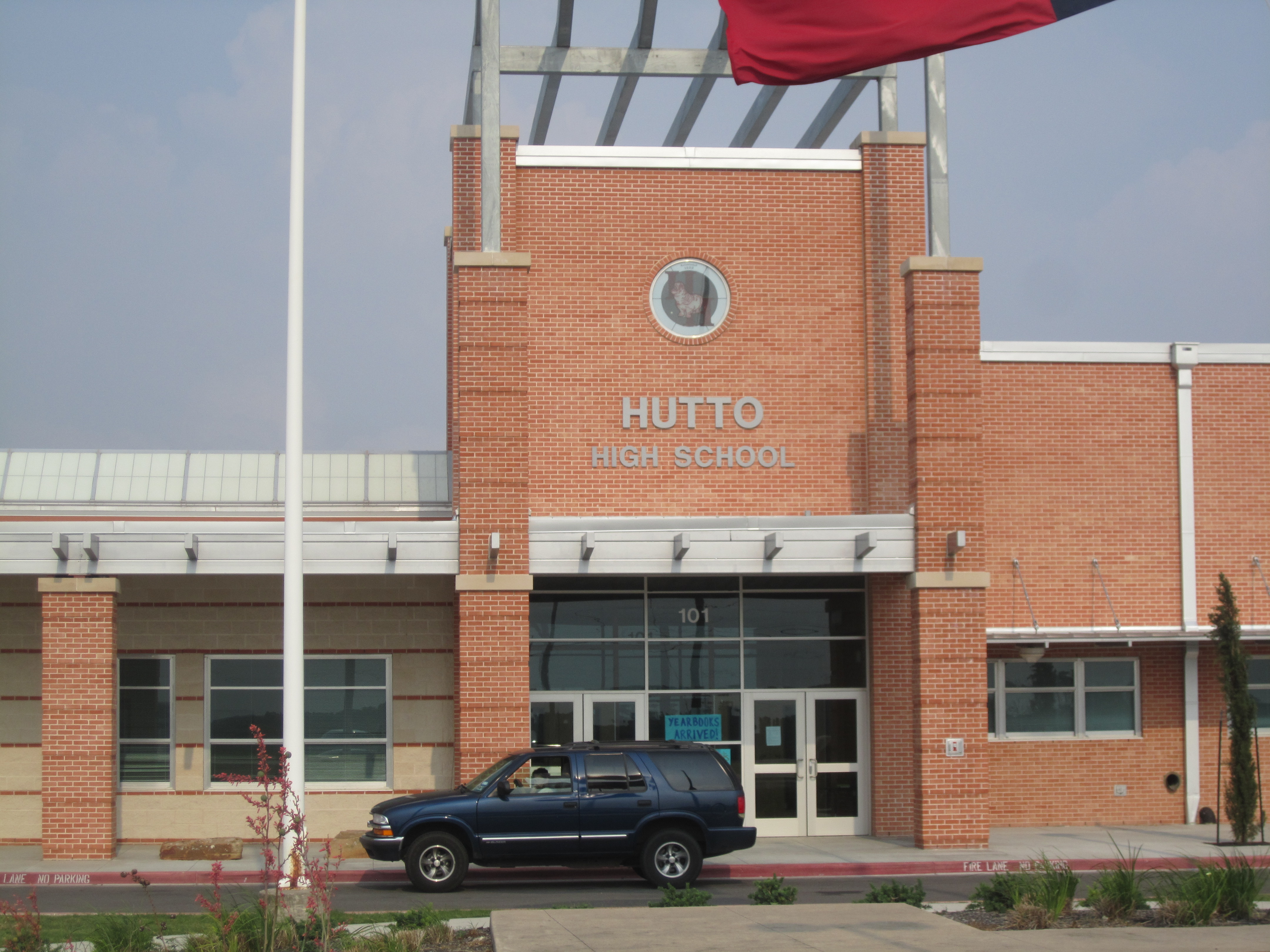

Location
- 101 Chris Kelley Boulevard; Hutto, Texas 78634-0430; United States
- Coordinates: 30.5363°N 97.5621°W

Information
- School type: Public high school
- School district: Hutto Independent School District
- Principal: Ryan Burns
- Teaching staff: 136.52 (on an FTE basis)
- Grades: 10–12
- Enrollment: 3,314 (2025–2026)
- Student to teacher ratio: 15.62
- Colors: Orange & White
- Athletics conference: UIL Class 6A
- Mascot: Hippo
- Yearbook: Legend
- Website: Official website

Hutto High School is a public high school located in Hutto, Texas, USA, and classified as a 6A school by the UIL. It is part of the Hutto Independent School District located in east central Williamson County (part of the greater Austin-Round Rock area). In 2015, the school was rated "met standard" by the Texas Education Agency.

== History ==
In 2019, Hutto ISD voters approved a $194 million bond for school district improvements, which included $60.8 million for Hutto High School. Of that $60.8 million, $15.86 million were allocated for stadium renovations. Before the renovations, the stadium had a capacity of 4,700 with two concession stands and two restroom facilities. After the renovations, the stadium has a capacity of 10,000, with four concession stands and four restroom facilities.

== Athletics ==
The Hutto Hippos participate in cross country, volleyball, football, wrestling, basketball, powerlifting, swimming, soccer, golf, tennis, track, bowling, softball, and baseball.

=== State titles ===
- Volleyball - - 1999(2A)
- Tennis - 2016(5A)

==== State finalists ====
- Boys basketball - - 1961(1A), 1964(1A)
- Football – - 2005(3A/D2)
- Volleyball - - 1998(2A)

== Activities ==
Extracurricular activities available at Hutto High School include step, band, color guard, theater, JROTC, yearbook, and journalism.

== Notable alumni ==
- Davion Davis – National Football League (NFL) player (Minnesota Vikings, Cleveland Browns, Houston Texans)
- Jeremy Kerley– National Football League (NFL) New York Jets, San Francisco 49ers, Buffalo Bills
