= Taylor Independent School District =

School district in Texas, United States

Address
- 3101 North Main Street Taylor, Texas, 76574; United States

District information
- Grades: PK–12
- Schools: 8
- NCES District ID: 4842280

Students and staff
- Students: 3,063 (2023–2024)
- Teachers: 228.95 (on an FTE basis)
- Student–teacher ratio: 13.38:1

Other information
- Website: www.taylorisd.org

Taylor Independent School District is a public and private school district based in Taylor, Texas, USA.

In 2009, the school district was rated "academically acceptable" by the Texas Education Agency.

== Schools ==
- Taylor High School (grades 9–12; also serves students from the Coupland Independent School District)
- Legacy Early College High School (grades 9-12)
- Taylor Middle School (grades 6–8)
- T.H. Johnson Elementary School (grades PreK-K)
  - 1985-86 National Blue Ribbon School
- Naomi Pasemann Elementary School (grades 1–5)
- Main Street Intermediate School (grades 1–5)
