= Taylor, Texas =

- City
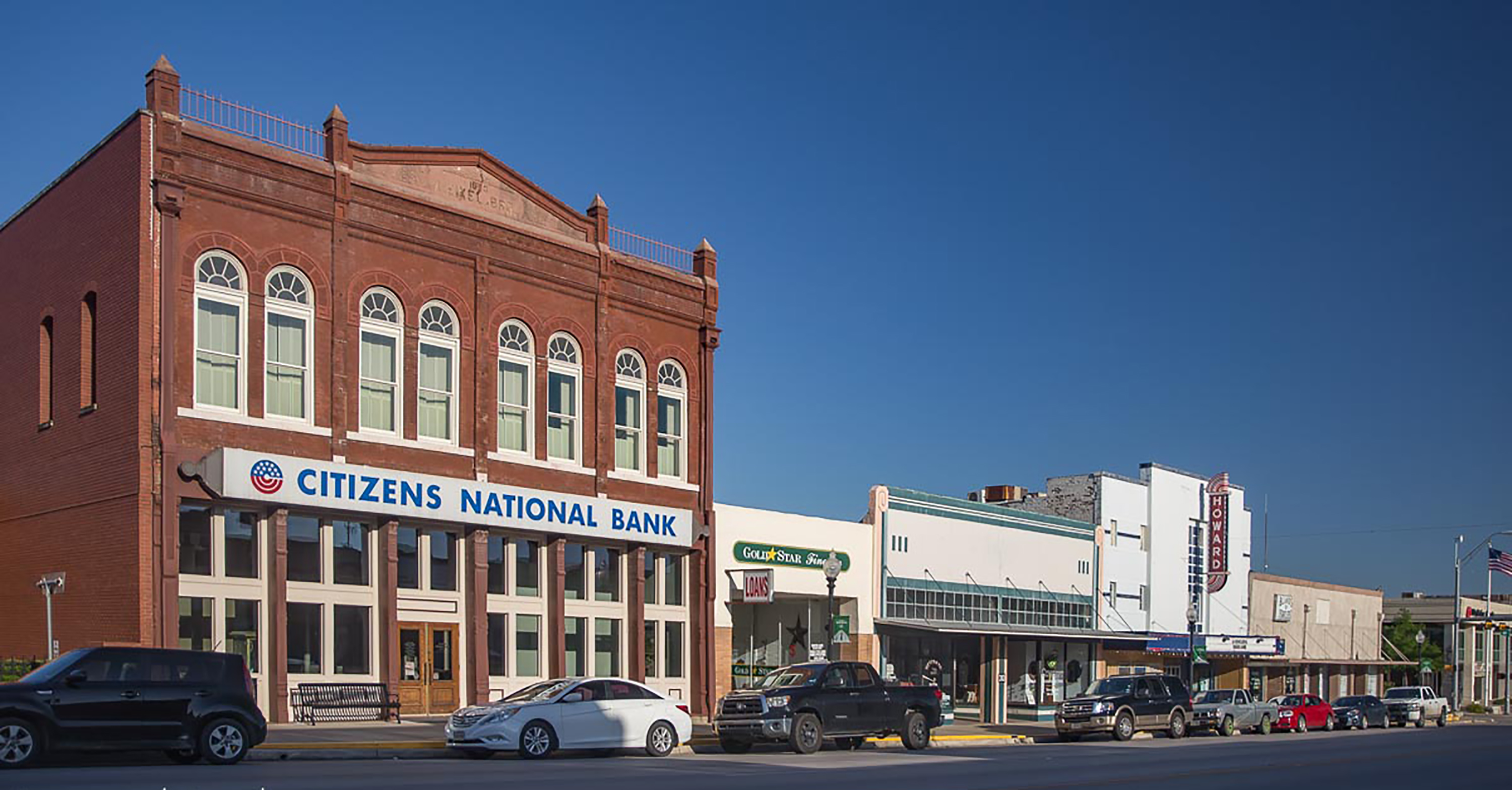
- Downtown Taylor (2019)
- Nickname: Taylor Made Texas
- Location of Taylor, Texas
- Coordinates: 30°34′21″N 97°25′00″W
- Country: United States
- State: Texas
- County: Williamson

Government
  - Type: Council-Manager
  - Mayor: Jim Buzan
  - City Manager: Brian LaBorde

Area
  - Total: 20.62 sq mi (53.40 km^{2})
  - Land: 20.50 sq mi (53.10 km^{2})
  - Water: 0.11 sq mi (0.29 km^{2})
- Elevation: 564 ft (172 m)

Population (2020)
  - Total: 16,267
  - Density: 847.8/sq mi (327.34/km^{2})
- Time zone: UTC-6 (Central (CST))
  - Summer (DST): UTC-5 (CDT)
- ZIP code: 76574
- Area code(s): 512 & 737
- FIPS code: 48-71948
- GNIS feature ID: 1369631
- Website: taylortx.gov

Taylor is a city in Williamson County, Texas, United States. The population at the 2020 Census was 16,267, up from 15,191 as of 2010.

== History ==
In 1876, the Texas Land Company auctioned lots in anticipation of the arrival of the International-Great Northern Railroad when Taylor was founded that year. The city was named after Edward Moses Taylor, a railroad official, under the name Taylorsville, which officially became Taylor in 1892. Immigrants from Moravia and Bohemia (now the Czech Republic) and other Slavic states, as well as from Germany and Austria, helped establish the town. It soon became a busy shipping point for cattle, grain, and cotton.

By 1878, the town had 1,000 residents and 32 businesses, 29 of which were destroyed by fire in 1879. Recovery was rapid, however, and more substantial buildings were constructed. In 1882, the Taylor, Bastrop and Houston Railway (later part of the Missouri-Kansas-Texas Railroad) reached the community, and machine shops and a roundhouse served both rail lines. In 1882, the town was incorporated with a mayor-council form of city government, and in 1883, a public school system replaced a number of private schools.

By 1890, Taylor had two banks and the first savings and loan institution in Texas. An electric company, a cotton compress, and several newspapers were among the new enterprises. A water line from the San Gabriel River, a 100-man volunteer fire department, imported and local entertainment, and an annual fair made noteworthy news items by 1900.

Since 1900, Taylor's population growth has averaged roughly 128 new residents per year, based on an estimated population of 1100 in 1900. Between 2000 and 2010, the population grew 11.9%, from 13,575 to 15,191, about 1.2% per year.

On September 9 and 10, 1921, eighty-seven people in and around Taylor were killed in flooding of the San Gabriel River and Brushy Creek after 39.7 inches (1,010 mm) of rain fell in 36 hours on Williamson County.

In 1999, Charles Bland, a farmer, transferred an 87.97-acre tract (35.60 ha) in Taylor, Texas, to a public trust for $10, with the deed specifying the property be held for future use as parkland. It was transferred to the city, which sold it to the Taylor Economic Development corporation in 2008, and sold again to Blueprint Projects for $10 million, where it is now slated for development as a 135,000-square-foot data center.

== Geography ==
Taylor is located approximately nine miles east of Hutto, eight miles south of Granger and roughly 29 miles northeast of Austin.

According to the United States Census Bureau, the city has a total area of 13.6 square miles (35.1 km^{2}), of which 13.5 square miles (35.0 km^{2}) are land and 0.04 square mile (0.1 km^{2}) (0.22%) is covered by water.

=== Climate ===
The climate in this area is characterized by hot, humid summers and generally mild to cool winters. According to the Köppen climate classification, Taylor has a humid subtropical climate, Cfa on climate maps.

== Demographics ==
Historical population
Census	Pop.	Note	%±
1890	2,584		—
1900	4,211		63.0%
1910	5,314		26.2%
1920	5,965		12.3%
1930	7,463		25.1%
1940	7,875		5.5%
1950	9,071		15.2%
1960	9,434		4.0%
1970	9,616		1.9%
1980	10,619		10.4%
1990	11,472		8.0%
2000	13,575		18.3%
2010	15,191		11.9%
2020	16,267		7.1%
2025 (est.)	18,402		13.1%
U.S. Decennial Census; 2010-2020

=== 2020 census ===
As of the 2020 census, Taylor had a population of 16,267 people, 6,004 households, and 3,888 families residing in the city. The median age was 38.3 years. 24.0% of residents were under the age of 18 and 17.2% of residents were 65 years of age or older. For every 100 females there were 94.7 males, and for every 100 females age 18 and over there were 90.2 males age 18 and over.

93.1% of residents lived in urban areas, while 6.9% lived in rural areas.

There were 6,004 households in Taylor, of which 33.3% had children under the age of 18 living in them. Of all households, 47.0% were married-couple households, 18.0% were households with a male householder and no spouse or partner present, and 28.2% were households with a female householder and no spouse or partner present. About 26.0% of all households were made up of individuals and 12.9% had someone living alone who was 65 years of age or older.

There were 6,436 housing units, of which 6.7% were vacant. The homeowner vacancy rate was 1.6% and the rental vacancy rate was 7.5%.

Racial composition as of the 2020 census
Race	Number	Percent
White	9,198	56.5%
Black or African American	1,566	9.6%
American Indian and Alaska Native	281	1.7%
Asian	128	0.8%
Native Hawaiian and Other Pacific Islander	13	0.1%
Some other race	2,353	14.5%
Two or more races	2,728	16.8%
Hispanic or Latino (of any race)	6,842	42.1%

=== 2010 census ===
As of the census of 2010, 15,191 people and about 5,300 households were in the city. The population change between 2000 and 2010 was 11.9% (while the overall population change for Texas was 20.6%). The racial makeup of the city was 71.7% White, 10.2% African American, 1.2% Native American, 0.7% Asian, and 3.1% from other or two or more races. Hispanics or Latinos of any race were 42.8% of the population. About 7.7% of the population was under 5 years old, 27.5% were under 18 years old, and 11.9% were 65 years old or older.

=== 2005–2009 estimates ===
The percentage of high school graduates at age 25+ between the years 2005 and 2009 was 75.9%. The percentage of the population having a bachelor's degree or higher, age 25 or more, between the years of 2005 and 2009 was 17.6%. This is somewhat lower than the 25.4% statewide average.

The per capita income of $18,859 was lower than the state average of $24,318, and the median household income of $41,814 was lower than the state average of $48,199. The percentage of persons living at or below the poverty level in 2009 was 15.4%.

== Economy ==
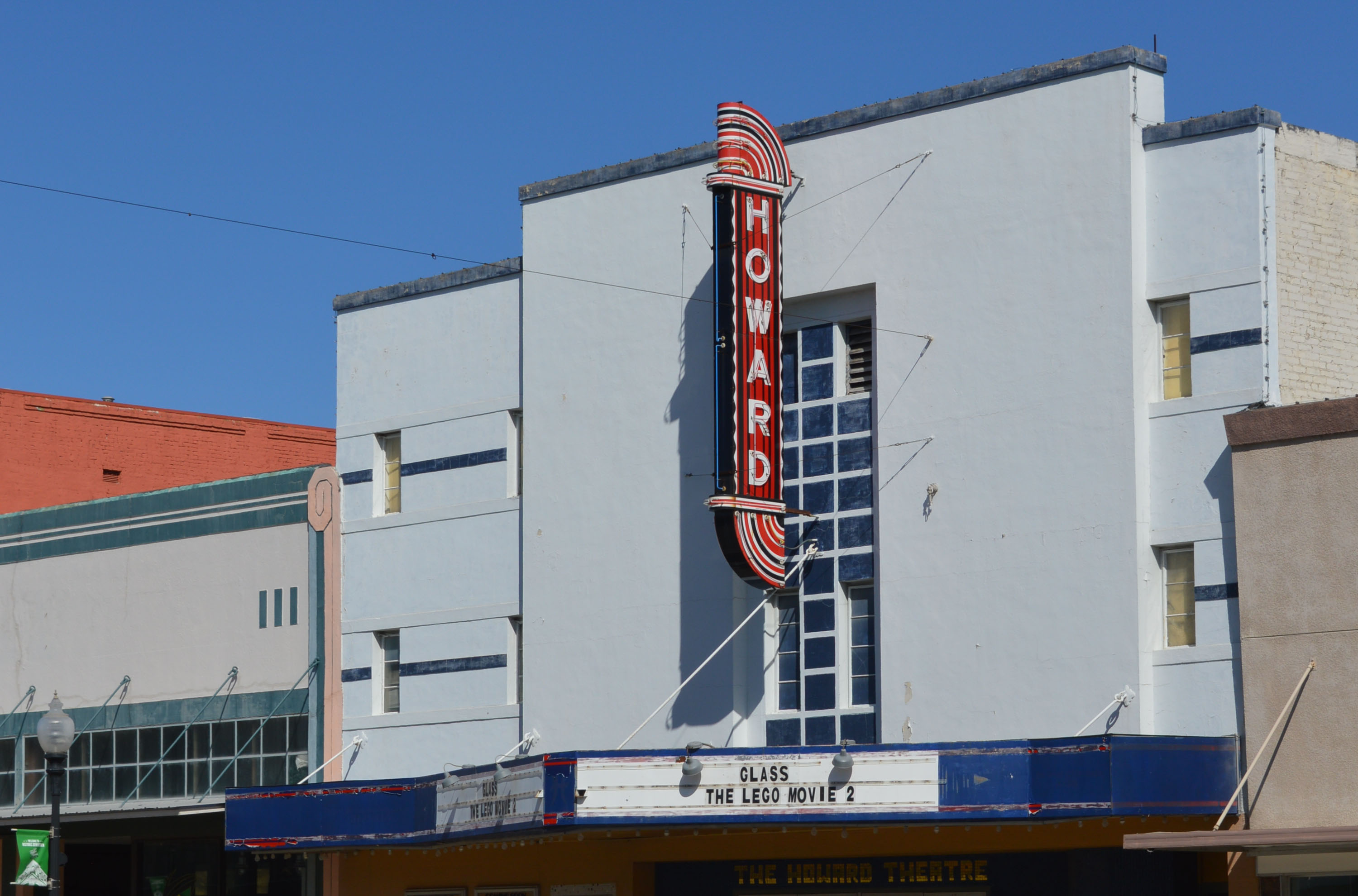
Howard Theatre, owned by Georgetown attorney William Bryan Farney and his wife, Marsha Farney, the District 20 member of the Texas House of Representatives from Williamson County

Taylor's largest employers include the Electric Reliability Council of Texas, Durcon Inc., Burrows Cabinets and the T. Don Hutto Residential Center.

The City of Taylor, along with the Taylor Economic Development Corporation and the Taylor Chamber of Commerce, works to attract new investment to improve the economic base and economic vitality of the community.

In November 2021, Samsung announced its intention to build a US$17 billion semiconductor plant near the city of Taylor. The facility is expected to be the largest employer in the area with 2,000 jobs. Limited operations began in 2025 as construction continued.

== Parks and recreation ==
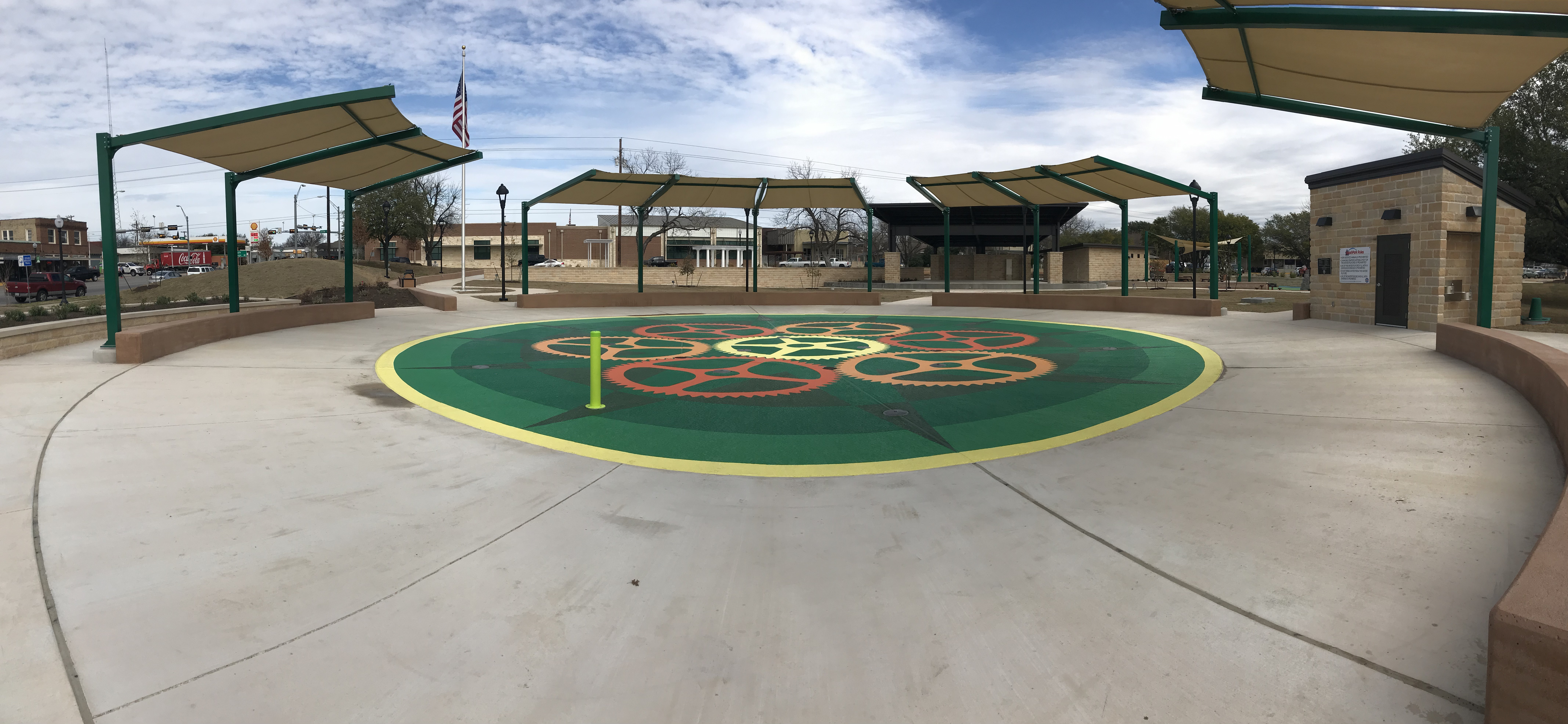
Heritage Square Park is located in downtown Taylor.

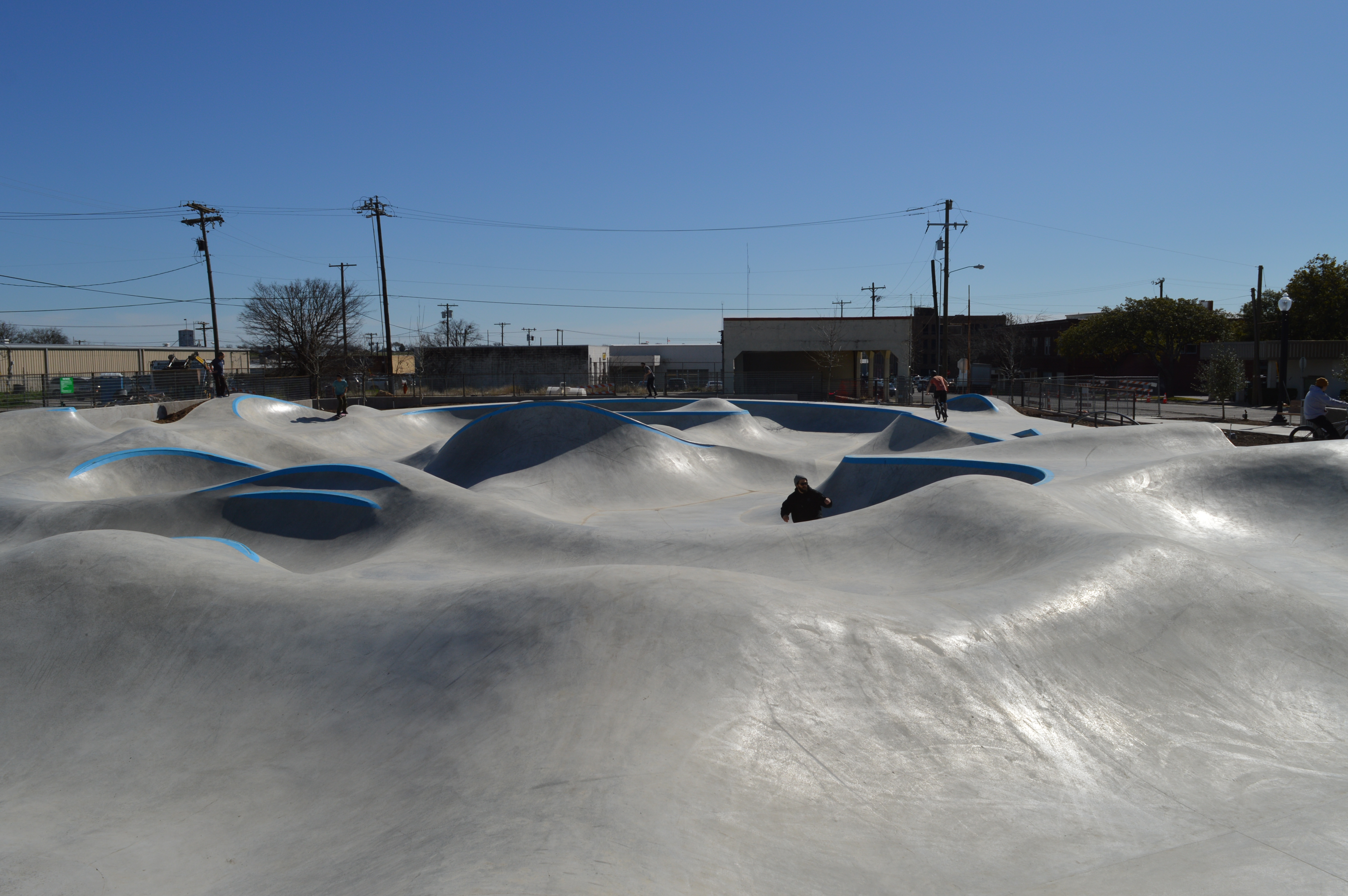
Pierce Park is a skate park located at 200 East 4th Street.

== Education ==
In 2011, Taylor Independent School District was quoted as being an "emerging gem"' by the Texas Education Agency, District XIX, for the improvements made to the curriculum and programming. In addition, Taylor ISD won six Gold performance standard awards for academic performance, according to the state of Texas during the 2011 school year. Taylor is home to the Taylor High School Ducks. As of 2011, Taylor Independent School District was ranked 634th of 953 Texas school districts, and Taylor High School is ranked 850th of 1517 Texas public high schools, placing both the school district and the high school in the middle one-third of Texas schools.

In 2011, the Taylor ISD opened a new high school. The new high school currently accommodates 900 students in the 207,000-ft^{2} campus, with a core facility for 1,200 students. Students also use a Wi-Fi network, two gyms, a second-floor library, and 58 classrooms, including a culinary arts academy, a modern welding lab, and a band hall.

In the 2011–2012 school year, students from Taylor ISD won their fifth invitation to the World Odyssey of the Mind competitions, and the high school academic team won second place at the state's highest academic competition, the Academic Decathlon. The school district as a whole also merited six achievement awards from Texas Education Agency in 2011–2012.

Legacy Early College High School students earn an associate degree before graduating high school. The district currently has more than 3,000 students enrolled.

St. Mary's Catholic School, established in 1896, was opened by Dominican Sisters upon invitation from Father Malachy Crowe, the priest of St. Mary's parish. After discontinuation of the original high school in 1966, the high school was reopened, 54 years later, in the fall of 2020.

== Transportation ==
The Amtrak station offers connectivity across the U.S. on the Texas Eagle rail line, and connects with the Capital Area Rural Transportation System and Greyhound. It is a platform only, with no accommodations.

== Media ==
The local newspaper is the Taylor Press.

Notable movies filmed in and around Taylor:

- Heartbreak Hotel
- The Hot Spot
- The War at Home
- The Big Green
- Michael
- SubUrbia
- Home Fries
- Little Boy Blue
- Varsity Blues
- The Rookie
- Where the Heart Is
- The Life of David Gale
- The Texas Chainsaw Massacre
- Secondhand Lions
- The Wendell Baker Story
- Friday Night Lights
- Drop Dead Sexy
- Infamous
- The Hitcher
- Balls Out: Gary the Tennis Coach
- Joe
- Transformers: Age of Extinction

== Notable people ==
- Tex Avery, animator
- Michael Carter, politician
- Greg Ginn, of Black Flag relocated SST records to Taylor in 2007
- K. C. Jones, NBA player and coach; member of Hall of Fame
- Fred Kerley, Olympic Athlete
- Dicky Moegle, athlete
- Dan Moody, governor of Texas
- Hank Patterson, actor
- Guy Penrod, southern gospel vocalist, formerly of the Gaither Vocal Band
- Bill Pickett, African-American cowboy, rodeo performer, and actor
- Melinda Plowman, actress
- John Threadgill, mayor of Taylor and Oklahoma legislator
- Rip Torn, actor
