= Brushy Creek (San Gabriel River tributary) =

River in Texas

Coordinates: 30.7236°N 97.0471°W

- Map of Brushy Creek (red), North Fork Brushy Creek (black) and South Fork Brushy Creek (blue) and South Brushy Creek (purple)

Location
- Country: United States

Physical characteristics
- Source
  - location: Texas

Brushy Creek is a tributary of the San Gabriel River in Texas that flows east for 69 miles.

== Route ==
North Fork Brushy Creek and South Fork Brushy Creek merge north of Leander, Texas to form Brushy Creek. South Brushy Creek feeds Brushy Creek from south of Cedar Park, Texas. Brushy Creek ultimately merges into the San Gabriel River 5 miles north of Rockdale, Texas.

== Parks ==
The namesake "Round Rock" of Round Rock, Texas sits in Brushy Creek west of Interstate 35.

Long-term plans envision a trail that will go from Leander to Hutto, Texas, via Cedar Park and Round Rock, generally following the route of Brushy Creek. The following segments have been created:

- Sarita Valley Greenbelt. Ground broke on the Sarita Valley neighborhood in early 2011. This greenbelt was created as a requirement of Leander's Parkland Dedication Ordinance and is owned and maintained by the City of Leander. The trail itself begins at the convergence of the North and South Forks of Brushy Creek.
- Brushy Creek Regional Trail. Williamson County maintains roughly 7.75 miles of trail that run along South Brushy Creek, starting at Twin Lakes Park along a 2.75-mile segment that was constructed in 2008 as part of the $1.5 million phase III. Phase I had been constructed in 2003 at a budget of $1.5 million and runs for 3 mi, west from Parmer Lane to the intersection of Brushy Creek Road and Great Oaks Drive. Construction on the 0.9-mi phase V concluded in 2020 at a cost of $3.1 million. Phase V runs from the Creekside Plaza Shopping Center in Round Rock, located at Chisholm Trail and Round Rock Avenue to a dead end at 30°31'04.3"N 97°42'09.6"W. Phase VI will close the 1.5 mi gap to the rest of the trail (which ceases to follow Brushy Creek at 30°31'31.6"N 97°43'20.6"W and ultimately ends in the Fern Bluff MUD).
- Brushy Creek Trail - City of Round Rock. Round Rock, Texas maintains roughly 3.1 miles of trail from A.W. Grimes Blvd. to Red Bud Ln. Construction on this $3 million segment began in 2008.

== See also ==
- List of rivers of Texas
