= Williamson County, Texas =

County in Texas, United States

- County
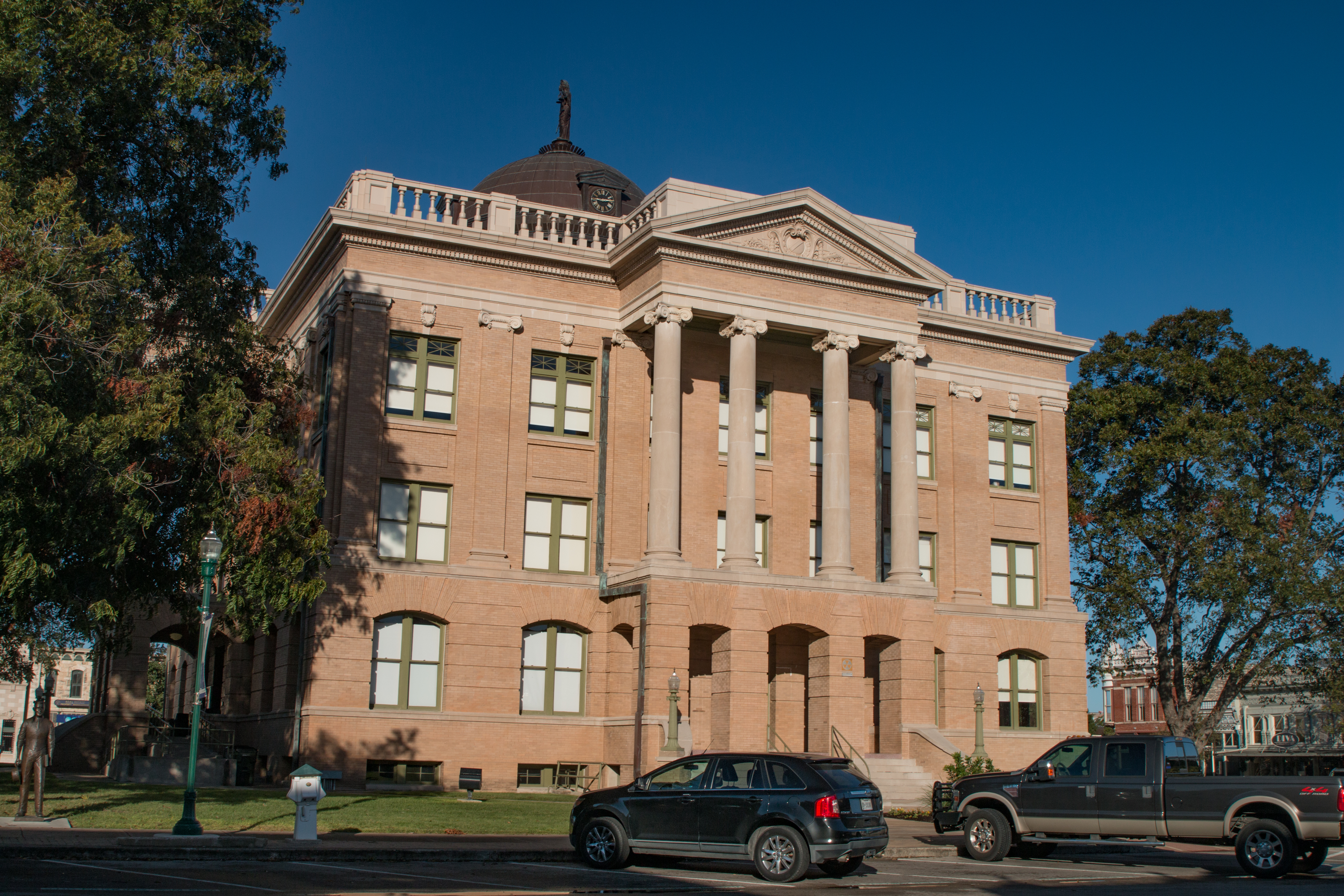
- The Williamson County Courthouse in 2019

- Seal

- Location within the U.S. state of Texas
- Coordinates: 30°39′20″N 97°35′02″W
- Country: United States
- State: Texas
- Founded: March 13, 1848
- Named for: Robert McAlpin Williamson
- Seat: Georgetown
- Largest city: Round Rock

Area
  - Total: 1,134 sq mi (2,940 km^{2})
  - Land: 1,118 sq mi (2,900 km^{2})
  - Water: 16 sq mi (41 km^{2}) 1.4%

Population (2020)
  - Total: 609,017
  - Estimate (2025): 752,827 ▲
  - Density: 544.7/sq mi (210.3/km^{2})
- Time zone: UTC−6 (Central)
  - Summer (DST): UTC−5 (CDT)
- Congressional districts: 10th, 17th, 31st, 37th
- Website: www.wilcotx.gov

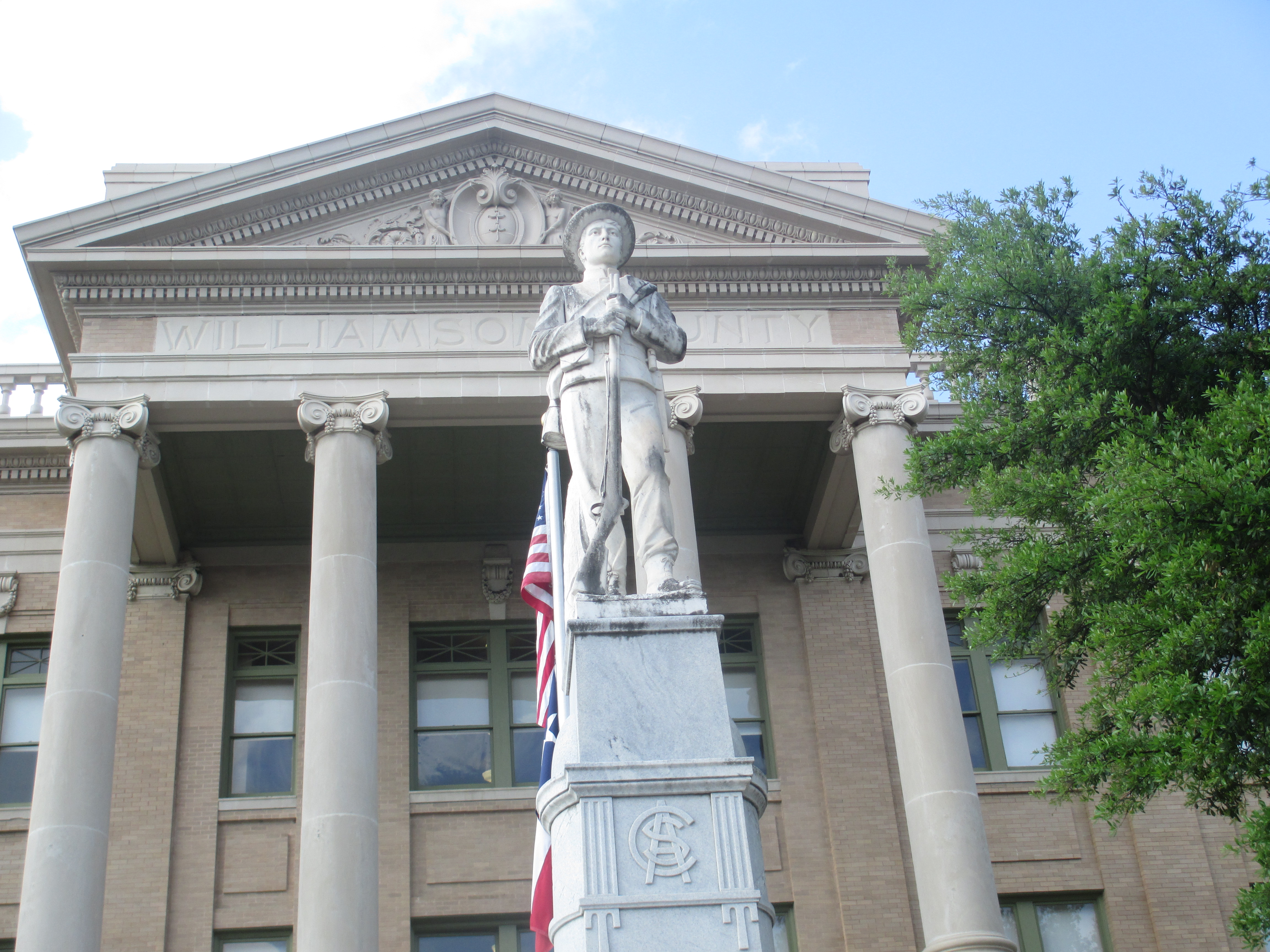
Confederate statue at Williamson County courthouse

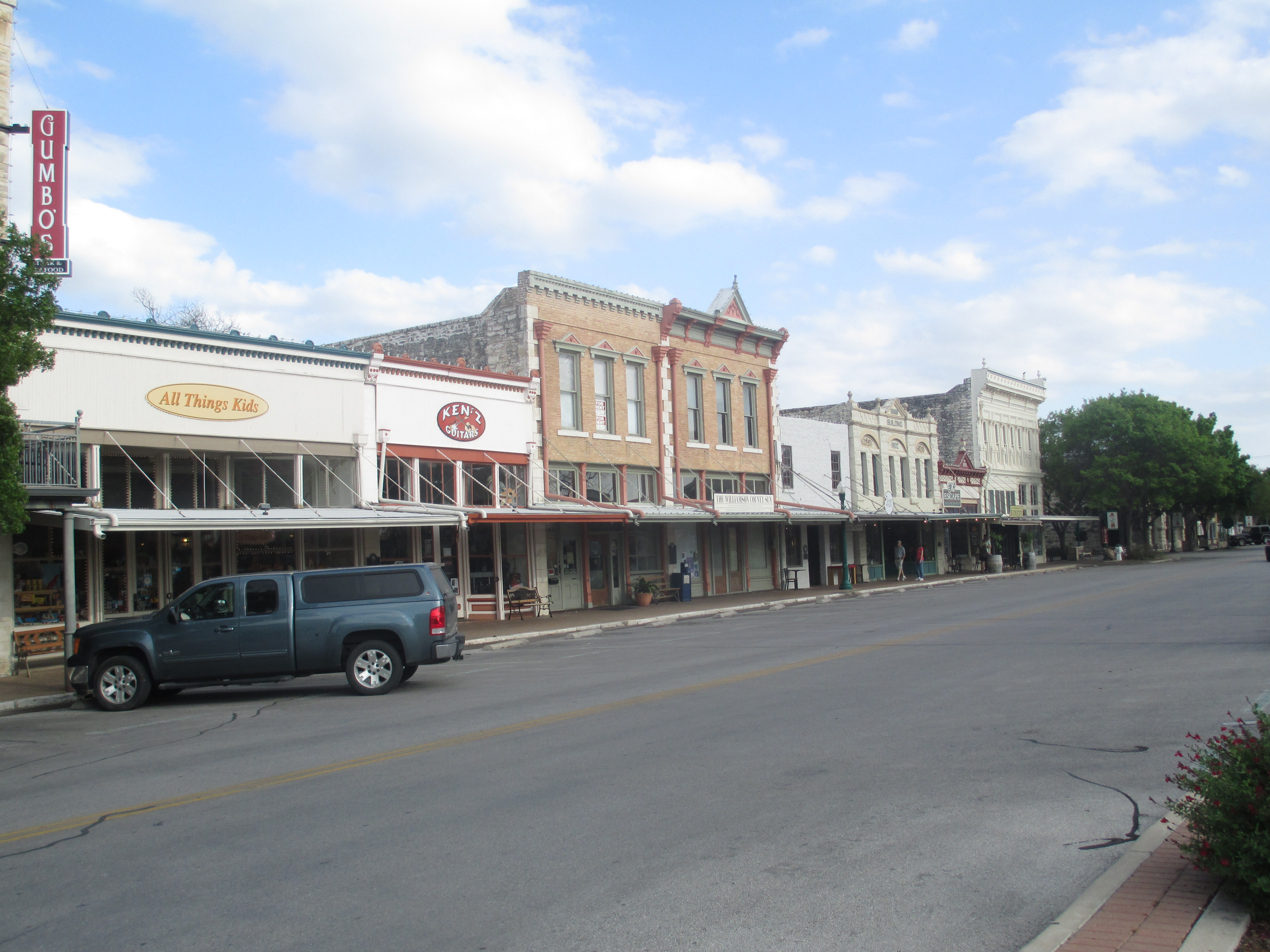
A part of Courthouse Square in Georgetown

Williamson County (sometimes abbreviated as "Wilco") is a county in the U.S. state of Texas. As of the 2020 census, its population was 609,017. The 2025 population estimate was 752,827. Its county seat is Georgetown. The county is named after Robert McAlpin Williamson (c. 1804–1859), a community leader and a veteran of the Battle of San Jacinto.

Williamson County is part of the Austin-Round Rock-San Marcos metropolitan statistical area. It was included with Austin in the Best Cities to Live in for 2009 by the Milken Institute. Located in Central Texas, it is on both the Edwards Plateau to the west, rocky terrain and hills, and Texas Blackland Prairies in the east, rich, fertile farming land. The two areas are roughly bisected by Interstate 35.

== History ==
=== Prehistoric ===
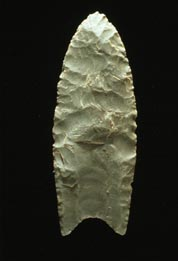
This Clovis point is from a period of habitation of about 11,200 years ago.

Much of Williamson County has been the site of human habitation for at least 11,200 years. The earliest known inhabitants of the area lived during the late Pleistocene (Ice Age), and are linked to the Clovis culture around 9,200 BC based on evidence found at Bell County's much-studied Gault Site. One of the most important discoveries in recent times is the ancient skeletal remains dubbed the "Leanderthal Lady" because of its age and proximity to Leander, Texas. It was discovered by accident by the Texas Department of Transportation workers while drilling core samples for a new highway. The site has been extensively studied for many years, and samples from this site carbon date to the Pleistocene period around 10,500 years ago. Prehistoric and Archaic "open occupation" campsites are also found throughout the county along streams and other water sources, including Brushy Creek in Round Rock and the San Gabriel River in Georgetown. Such evidence of Archaic-period inhabitants is often in the form of relics and flint tools recovered from burned rock middens. Many such sites were inundated when the San Gabriel River was dammed to create Lake Granger.

The earliest known historical Native American occupants, the Tonkawa, were a flint-working, hunting people who followed the buffalo on foot and periodically set fire to the prairie to aid them in their hunts. During the 18th century, they made the transition to a horse culture and used firearms to a limited extent. After they were crowded out by white settlement, the Comanches continued to raid settlements in the county until the 1860s. Also, small numbers of Kiowa, Yojuane, Tawakoni, and Mayeye Indians apparently were living in the county at the time of the earliest Anglo settlements.

=== 1921 Thrall flood ===
On September 9-10, 1921, the remnants of a hurricane moved over Williamson County. The center of the storm became stationary over Thrall, a small farming town in eastern Williamson County, dropping a storm total of 39.7 in (1,010 mm) of rain in 36 hours. The 24-hour rainfall total ending 7 am on September 10, 1921 (38.2 in (970 mm)) at a U.S. Weather Bureau station in Thrall remains the national official 24-hour rainfall record. Thrall's rainfall was 23.4 in (590 mm) during 6 hours, 31.8 in (810 mm) during 12 hours, and 36.4 in (920 mm) during 18 hours. Eighty-seven people drowned in and near Taylor, and 93 in Williamson County. This storm caused the most deadly floods in Texas, with a total of 215 fatalities.

=== 1997 Tornado outbreak ===
On May 27, 1997, Williamson County was hit by the worst tornado outbreak in county history. The 1997 Central Texas tornado outbreak caused 20 tornadoes including an F-5 (the strongest rating used for tornadoes on the Fujita scale), which remains the only F-5 to strike Williamson County. The F-5 tornado killed 27 people and completely destroyed the Double Creek Estates neighborhood in the city of Jarrell, Texas, located in far northern Williamson County. Another strong tornado, an F-3, struck Cedar Park, killing one person. Two F-2 tornadoes also struck Williamson County. The outbreak cost the county over $190 million in damages and a total of 30 fatalities.

=== Modern growth ===
Williamson County's fast growth rate is due in large part to its location immediately north of Austin coupled with Austin's rapid expansion northward; Austin's city limits cross into Williamson County. Most of the growth has been residential, but large employers, such as Dell's international headquarters, have also changed Williamson County from a bedroom community into a community where citizens can live and work in the same general vicinity. This has transformed the county over recent years into a dynamic, self-sustaining community with less dependency on Austin. Major retail and commercial developments began appearing from 1999 to present, including the Rivery in Georgetown, and the Premium Outlet Mall, the IKEA-area retail, and the La Frontera mixed-use center in Round Rock. Health care and higher education have also become major factors in the county's growth. Two new colleges and two new hospitals have opened since 2015. Another significant factor has been the opening of the North Loop 1 and Texas State Highway 45 toll roads, which have made Williamson County more accessible to Austin.

== Geography ==
According to the United States Census Bureau, the county has an area of 1,134 sq mi (2,940 km^{2}), of which 1,118 square miles (2,900 km^{2}) is land and 16 square miles (41 km^{2}), comprising 1.4%, is water.

The area is divided into two regions by the Balcones Escarpment, which runs through the center from north to south along a line from Jarrell to Georgetown to Round Rock. The county's western half is an extension of the Western Plains and considered to be within the eastern fringes of Texas Hill Country; it has an average elevation of 850 ft (260 m). It features undulating, hilly brushland with an abundance of Texas live oak, prickly pear cactus, and karst. The county's eastern half is part of the Coastal Plains and is flat to gently rolling with an average elevation of 600 ft (180 m). It has dark clay and rich, fertile soils for agriculture, but is quickly being developed as the county's population continues to increase and expand out. Williamson County is drained in the center and south by the San Gabriel River, the county's only river, and in the north by creeks that run into the Lampasas and Little Rivers north of the county line.

=== Topography ===
Williamson County's eastern portion lies within the low-lying prairie areas east of the Balcones Escarpment (also known as the Balcones Fault, though it is not an active fault). It begins a piedmont, a foot-friendly fall line of slightly sloping land downward to the coastal area, an area of the Blackland Prairie consisting of rich, fertile, clay-containing soils, where the land is still used for agriculture, growing cotton and other crops and raising cattle. These prairie lands essentially run from Williamson County to the Gulf Coast, and have a rich heritage of being farmed by German, Polish, and other settlers.

West of the escarpment is the beginning of the "upland" Texas Hill Country, characterized by rocky terrain with thin layers of soil on top of limestone. Some ranching occurs in the uplands, but mostly it has been the target of residential development because of the rolling terrain, vistas, hardwood trees, abundant wildlife, and rivers and streams (the same reason early Indians camped in the area). The Hill Country areas are characterized by their porous "vugular" (honeycombed) rock, where rainwater percolates down to replenish the Edwards Aquifer. For that reason, development restrictions are in place and several endangered species are protected by the United States Fish and Wildlife Service (USFWS).Interstate 35, the county's main artery, runs along the fault line dividing the two distinct regions.

=== Environmentally protected areas ===
Balcones Canyonlands National Wildlife Refuge is in the Texas Hill Country northwest of Austin, including parts of western Williamson County. The refuge was formed in 1992 to conserve habitat for two endangered songbirds, the golden-cheeked warbler and the black-capped vireo, and to preserve Texas Hill Country habitat for other wildlife species. The refuge augments a similarly named preserve in Austin, the Balcones Canyonlands Preserve. The vegetation found in the Hill Country includes various oaks, elms, and Ashe juniper trees (often called "cedar" in Texas). The golden-cheeked warbler and black-capped vireo depend on different successional stages of this vegetation, and both nest in the Edwards Plateau, the warbler exclusively so. Some protected areas are open to visitors, such as the Berry Springs Park.

=== Endangered species ===
Williamson County is home to five endangered species. Two are songbirds protected by the Balcones Canyonlands Preserve in Travis and Williamson Counties. The other three are invertebrate species found only in Williamson County, which live in the cavelike fissures on the west side of the county. Karst topography is the name for the honeycomb-type limestone formations (including caves, sinkholes, and fissures) typical of the county's limestone geology west of Interstate 35. In the 1990s, a group of concerned landowners, individuals, and real-estate developers formed the Northern Edwards Aquifer Resource Council with the goal of obtaining a USFWS 10-A permit (known as an incidental take permit) for the county by identifying and preserving sufficiently many caves with endangered species to ensure survival of the species. These species would be preserved through voluntary donations of land rather than required setbacks, grants, and other involuntary means typically enforced on landowners without an incidental take permit. The group transferred its successful work on an environmental impact statement to the county in 2002 and a county-wide 10-A permit was obtained in October 2008. Property owners are able to participate in the county's 10-A permit by applying through the WCCF.

=== Adjacent counties ===
- Bell County (north)
- Milam County (northeast)
- Lee County (southeast)
- Bastrop County (southeast)
- Travis County (south)
- Burnet County (west)

== Demographics ==
Historical population
Census	Pop.	Note	%±
1850	1,568		—
1860	4,529		188.8%
1870	6,368		40.6%
1880	15,155		138.0%
1890	25,909		71.0%
1900	38,072		46.9%
1910	42,228		10.9%
1920	42,934		1.7%
1930	44,146		2.8%
1940	41,698		−5.5%
1950	38,853		−6.8%
1960	35,044		−9.8%
1970	37,305		6.5%
1980	76,521		105.1%
1990	139,551		82.4%
2000	249,967		79.1%
2010	422,679		69.1%
2020	609,017		44.1%
2025 (est.)	752,827	▲	23.6%
U.S. Decennial Census; 1850–2010 2010–2020

=== Racial and ethnic composition ===
Williamson County, Texas – Racial and ethnic composition Note: the US Census treats Hispanic/Latino as an ethnic category. This table excludes Latinos from the racial categories and assigns them to a separate category. Hispanics/Latinos may be of any race.
Race / Ethnicity (NH = Non-Hispanic)	Pop 1980	Pop 1990	Pop 2000	Pop 2010	Pop 2020	% 1980	% 1990	% 2000	% 2010	% 2020
White alone (NH)	62,062	110,724	183,847	269,481	336,410	81.10%	79.34%	73.55%	63.76%	55.24%
Black or African American alone (NH)	4,033	6,537	12,444	24,744	38,557	5.27%	4.68%	4.98%	5.85%	6.33%
Native American or Alaska Native alone (NH)	114	424	759	1,340	1,659	0.15%	0.30%	0.30%	0.32%	0.27%
Asian alone (NH)	424	1,760	6,483	20,084	53,982	0.55%	1.26%	2.59%	4.75%	8.86%
Native Hawaiian or Pacific Islander alone (NH)	x	x	161	354	592	x	x	0.06%	0.08%	0.10%
Other race alone (NH)	195	102	230	661	3,124	0.25%	0.07%	0.09%	0.16%	0.51%
Mixed race or Multiracial (NH)	x	x	3,053	7,981	27,605	x	x	1.22%	1.89%	4.53%
Hispanic or Latino (any race)	9,693	20,004	42,990	98,034	147,088	12.67%	14.33%	17.20%	23.19%	24.15%
Total	76,521	139,551	249,967	422,679	609,017	100.00%	100.00%	100.00%	100.00%	100.00%

=== American Community Survey 2025 data ===
The United States Census Bureau estimated that in 2025, Williamson County’s population was 752.827. It was also estimated that the county's population was 48,97% Non-Hispanic White, 25,64% Hispanic or Latino, 7,19% Non-Hispanic Black, 13,94% Asian, 0,28% Native American, 0,11% Pacific Islander, and 3,88% Multiracial.

Total	Population	Percentage
Non-Hispanic White	368.646	48,97%
Hispanic or Latino	193.052	25,64%
Non-Hispanic Black	54.125	7,19%
Asian	104.940	13,94%
Native American	2.089	0,28%
Pacific Islander	797	0,11%
Non-Hispanic Multiracial	29.178	3,88%

Municipal population history
#	Largest Cities in Williamson County	1950	1960	1970	1980	1990	2000	2010	2020	2022 (estimate)
1	Round Rock	1,438	1,878	2,811	11,812	30,923	61,136	99,887	119,468	126,697
2	Georgetown	4,951	5,218	6,395	9,468	14,842	28,339	47,400	67,176	86,507
3	Cedar Park	202	385	692	3,474	5,161	26,049	48,937	77,595	77,642
4	Leander	–	–	–	2,179	3,398	7,596	26,521	59,202	74,375
5	Hutto	529	400	545	659	630	1,250	14,698	27,577	36,655
6	Taylor	9,071	9,434	9,616	10,619	11,472	13,575	15,191	16,267	16,975
7	Liberty Hill	–	–	–	–	–	1,409	967	3,646	9,099
	Williamson County total	38,853	35,044	37,305	76,521	139,551	249,967	422,679	609,017	671,418

=== 2020 census ===
As of the 2020 census, the county had a population of 609,017. The median age was 36.7 years, with 25.6% of residents under the age of 18 and 13.0% of residents aged 65 or older. For every 100 females there were 96.3 males, and for every 100 females age 18 and over there were 93.6 males age 18 and over.

The racial makeup of the county was 61.3% White, 6.7% Black or African American, 0.8% American Indian and Alaska Native, 9.0% Asian, 0.1% Native Hawaiian and Pacific Islander, 7.2% from some other race, and 15.0% from two or more races. Hispanic or Latino residents of any race comprised 24.2% of the population.

90.8% of residents lived in urban areas, while 9.2% lived in rural areas.

There were 224,506 households in the county, of which 37.6% had children under the age of 18 living in them. Of all households, 55.5% were married-couple households, 15.8% were households with a male householder and no spouse or partner present, and 22.6% were households with a female householder and no spouse or partner present. About 22.4% of all households were made up of individuals and 7.5% had someone living alone who was 65 years of age or older.

There were 237,680 housing units, of which 5.5% were vacant. Among occupied housing units, 65.1% were owner-occupied and 34.9% were renter-occupied. The homeowner vacancy rate was 1.6% and the rental vacancy rate was 8.0%.

=== 2010 census ===
As of the census of 2010, there were 422,679 people, 152,606 households, and 111,514 families resided in the county. The population density was 373 people per square mile (144 people/km^{2}). The 162,773 housing units averaged 144 units per square mile (56 units/km^{2}). The racial makeup of the county was 80.9% White, 7.1% African American, 1.3% Native American, 5.8% Asian, 0.3% Pacific Islander, 6.9% from other races, and 3.2% from two or more races. About 23.2% of the population was Hispanic or Latino of any race.

Of the 111,514 households, 39.1% had children under the age of 18 living with them, 57.9% were married couples living together, 10.8% had a female householder with no husband present, and 26.9% were not families. Around 21.2% of all households were made up of individuals, and 17.4% had someone living alone who was 65 years of age or older. The average household size was 2.74 and the average family size was 3.20.

In the county, the age distribution was 28.7% under 18, 11.9% from 15 to 24, 31.6% from 25 to 44, 23.2% from 45 to 64, and 8.9% who were 65 or older. The median age was 34 years.

The median income for a household in the county was $60,642, and for a family was $66,208. Males had a median income of $43,471 versus $30,558 for females. The per capita income for the county was $24,547. About 3.40% of families and 4.80% of the population were below the poverty line, including 5.40% of those under age 18 and 5.90% of those age 65 or over.

== Government and politics ==
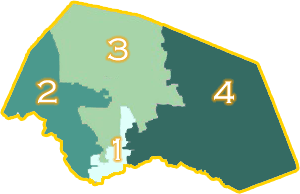
Williamson County Precinct Map – Image courtesy of the Williamson County Commissioners Court

The Commissioners Court is the overall governing and management body of Williamson County, and is responsible for all budgetary decisions in addition to setting the tax rate each year. Among its duties is the administration of all county business, including the building and maintenance of county roads and bridges. Commissioners' courts are governing bodies of county government in several US states, including Texas. The principal functions of the commissioners' court are legislative and executive. Although called courts, commissioners' courts generally exercise only limited judicial powers. The commissioners' court consists of five members. The county judge presides as chairman, and is elected every four years by voters countywide. Four commissioners are elected by single-member precincts every four years.

=== County government ===
==== Williamson County elected officials ====
Position	Name	Party
County Judge	Steven Snell	Republican
Commissioner, Precinct 1	Terry Cook	Democratic
Commissioner, Precinct 2	Cynthia Long	Republican
Commissioner, Precinct 3	Valerie Covey	Republican
Commissioner, Precinct 4	Russ Boles	Republican
District Attorney	Shawn Dick	Republican
District Clerk	Lisa David	Republican
County Attorney	Doyle Hobbs Jr.	Republican
County Clerk	Nancy Rister	Republican
Sheriff	Matthew Lindemann	Republican
Tax Assessor-Collector	Larry Gaddes	Republican
Treasurer	Scott Heselmeyer	Republican
Constable, Precinct 1	Mickey Chance	Democratic
Constable, Precinct 2	Jeff Anderson	Republican
Constable, Precinct 3	Kevin Wilkie	Republican
Constable, Precinct 4	Paul Leal	Republican

=== Congressional and state representation ===
In recent decades, Williamson County has been a strongly Republican county. Before the 2018 elections, every federal and state elected official from the county was a Republican. It is in Texas Senate District 5, and is represented by State Senator Charles Schwertner (R). Williamson County includes three Texas House of Representatives Districts: 20, 52, and 136. District 20 is represented by Republican Terry Wilson, 52 by Caroline Harris, and 136 by Democrat John Bucy III.

==== United States Congress ====
Representatives	Name	Party	First elected
District 10	Michael McCaul	Republican	2004
District 17	Pete Sessions	Republican	2020
District 31	John Carter	Republican	2002
District 37	Lloyd Doggett	Democratic	1994

=== Presidential election results ===
Williamson County has been a swing county since the late 2010s. The county votes to the left of the state as a whole.

It was once a solidly Democratic county. In 1976 election, it voted for President Jimmy Carter by a higher percentage (55%) than did voters in Travis County (52%). In the 1980 election, the county swung dramatically to support Ronald Reagan, giving him 56% of the vote, exceeding Carter's 1976 total. In subsequent years, the county became increasingly Republican, following a pattern similar to those of other suburban Texas counties. In 2004 election, President George W. Bush won 68% of the vote in Williamson County. John McCain received 55% of the vote to Barack Obama's 42% in the 2008 election. In 2012 election, Republican Mitt Romney defeated Obama, 59% to 38%. In 2016 election, Donald Trump beat Hillary Clinton, 51%–41%.

The county narrowly swung Democratic in 2020, with Joe Biden winning a plurality over Trump, 49% to 48%. The county narrowly swung back into the Trump column for the 2024 election, thereby voting for the presidential election winner in 2016, 2020, and 2024.

Democrats Beto O'Rourke and Colin Allred won the county against Ted Cruz in 2018 and 2024. Democrats James Talarico and John Bucy III both defeated Republican incumbents to win election to state districts based mostly in Williamson County. However, in the 2020 U.S. Senate election, county voters reelected Republican John Cornyn to the U.S. Senate as well as Republican John Carter to the U.S. House of Representatives. Republican governor Greg Abbott won the county in 2022 by only one point, further showing that county has moved away from being safely Republican and become a competitive battleground.

Election turnout reflects the county's tremendous growth. In 1964, only 9,202 votes were cast, compared to 309,515 in 2024.

United States presidential election results for Williamson County, Texas
Year	Republican		Democratic		Third party(ies)	
Year	No.	%	No.	%	No.	%
1912	246	9.57%	2,014	78.37%	310	12.06%
1916	656	19.01%	2,701	78.27%	94	2.72%
1920	819	16.21%	2,677	53.00%	1,555	30.79%
1924	934	12.33%	6,324	83.45%	320	4.22%
1928	1,833	33.14%	3,689	66.70%	9	0.16%
1932	418	5.79%	6,783	94.03%	13	0.18%
1936	375	6.97%	4,995	92.79%	13	0.24%
1940	1,714	22.34%	5,944	77.49%	13	0.17%
1944	1,239	16.67%	5,284	71.11%	908	12.22%
1948	1,094	15.57%	5,638	80.24%	294	4.18%
1952	3,646	42.09%	5,010	57.83%	7	0.08%
1956	2,947	40.00%	4,402	59.75%	18	0.24%
1960	2,429	30.86%	5,410	68.74%	31	0.39%
1964	1,766	19.19%	7,430	80.74%	6	0.07%
1968	2,923	28.87%	5,528	54.61%	1,672	16.52%
1972	6,998	64.40%	3,806	35.02%	63	0.58%
1976	7,481	43.98%	9,355	55.00%	174	1.02%
1980	15,035	56.39%	10,408	39.04%	1,218	4.57%
1984	25,774	72.03%	9,911	27.70%	99	0.28%
1988	27,322	57.85%	19,589	41.48%	319	0.68%
1992	26,208	42.79%	19,437	31.73%	15,609	25.48%
1996	36,836	55.37%	24,175	36.34%	5,511	8.28%
2000	65,041	67.80%	26,591	27.72%	4,303	4.49%
2004	83,284	64.97%	43,117	33.63%	1,797	1.40%
2008	88,323	55.49%	67,691	42.53%	3,152	1.98%
2012	97,006	59.22%	61,875	37.77%	4,923	3.01%
2016	104,175	50.90%	84,468	41.27%	16,016	7.83%
2020	139,729	48.15%	143,795	49.56%	6,644	2.29%
2024	155,310	50.35%	147,766	47.90%	5,393	1.75%

United States Senate election results for Williamson County, Texas{{{Seat}}}
Year	Republican		Democratic		Third party(ies)	
Year	No.	%	No.	%	No.	%
2024	146,451	47.85%	151,076	49.36%	8,518	2.78%

United States Senate election results for Williamson County, Texas2
Year	Republican		Democratic		Third party(ies)	
Year	No.	%	No.	%	No.	%
2020	142,391	50.17%	133,783	47.14%	7,633	2.69%
2026	108,074	38.78%	164,626	59.08%	5,968	2.14%

Texas Gubernatorial election results for Williamson County
Year	Republican		Democratic		Third party(ies)	
Year	No.	%	No.	%	No.	%
2022	111,488	49.43%	110,242	48.88%	3,823	1.69%
2026	118,285	42.24%	156,631	55.94%	5,105	1.82%

== Sun City Texas ==
One of the most significant growth factors of modern Williamson County is the location of a new Sun City community in Georgetown. Opened in June 1995, and originally named "Sun City Georgetown", Sun City Texas is a 5,300-acre (21-km^{2}) age-restricted community about 10 mi (16 km) west of IH-35 on Andice Road (RR 2338). It is part of the chain of Sun City communities started by Del E. Webb Construction Company (now a division of PulteGroup). Residency is restricted to persons over age 55 (at least one person in a couple has to be 55 or older) and the community is generally oriented toward retirees.

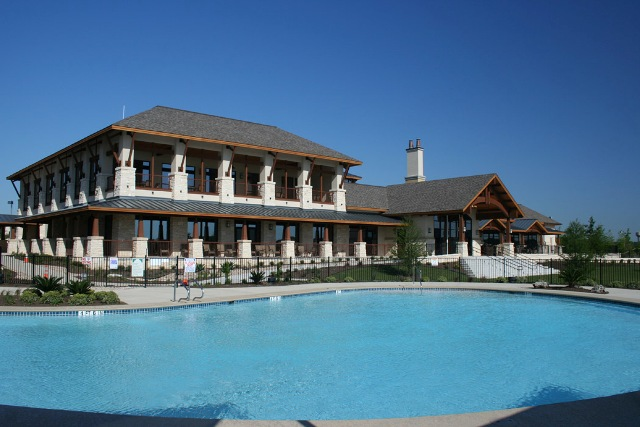
Sun City Texas pool at one of several recreation centers

As originally planned, the project would double the size of Georgetown's population. Sun City Texas is made up mostly of single-family dwellings, but also has duplexes. The Sun City project includes three golf courses (Legacy Hills, White Wing, and Cowan Creek). Although the community attracts residents from all over, most come from within Texas to stay close to their original homes. Vocal opposition to the project has occurred, especially at the start during the zoning process, with arguments against the size of the community, its effect on Georgetown as a family-oriented town, concerns about the costs of providing city utilities, concern about lowered city and Williamson County property taxes, which are fixed for retirees under Texas law, and the disproportionate effect of city voting.

By and large, though, the community has been welcomed and accepted by the Georgetown populace. In the 2008 city elections, for example, two residents of Sun City were the only candidates for mayor of Georgetown. They also were both formerly elected city council members.

== Economy ==
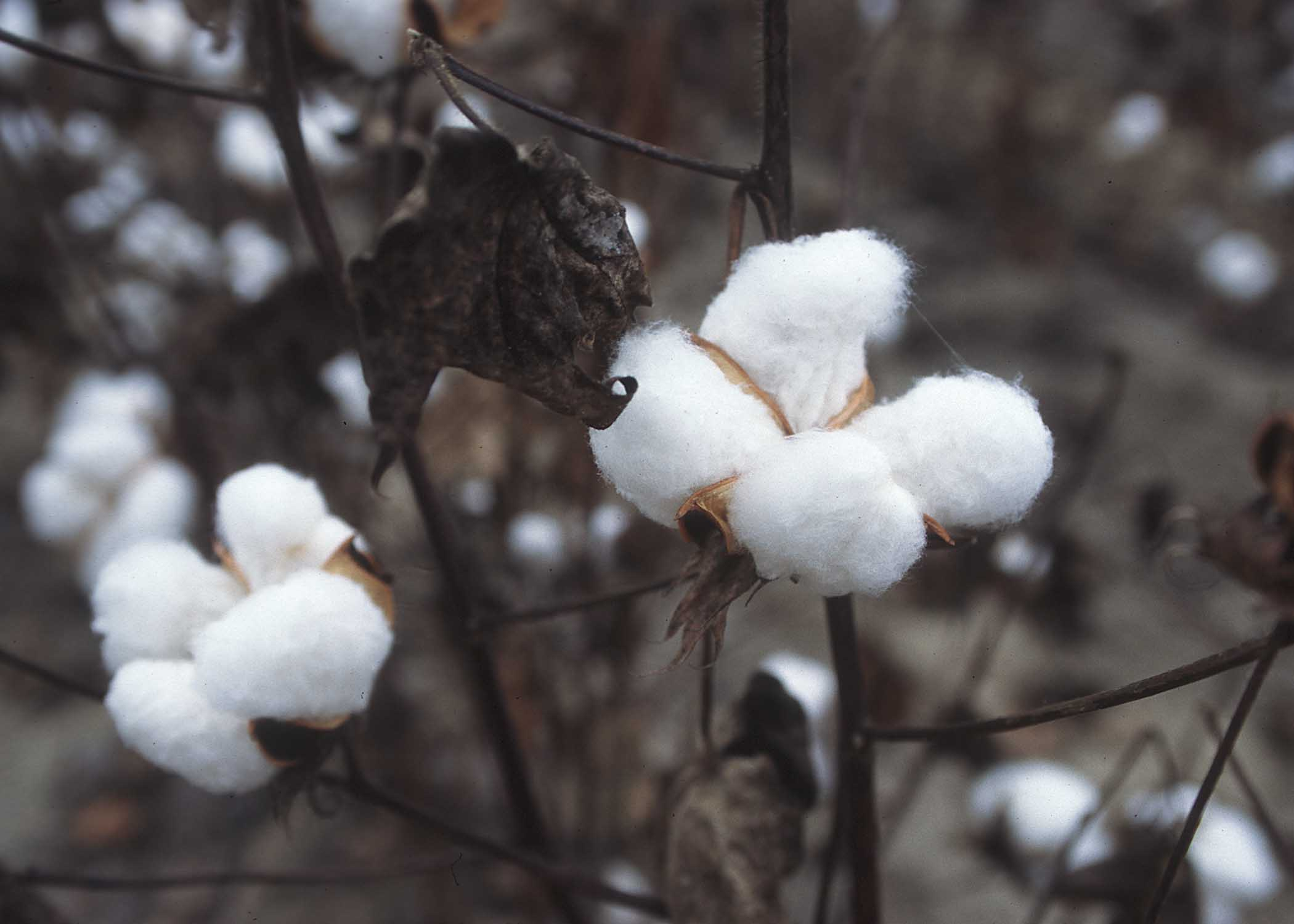
Cotton bolls ready for harvest

=== Agriculture ===
Williamson County was an agrarian community for most of the 19th and early 20th centuries. Cotton was the dominant crop in the area between the 1880s and the 1920s, and Williamson County was the top producer of cotton in Texas. Primarily to transport bales of cotton, the county was served by two national railroads, the International-Great Northern Railroad, which eventually merged into the Missouri Pacific, and the Missouri–Kansas–Texas Railroad. The town of Taylor in eastern Williamson County became the primary center for cotton production, cotton ginning, and compressing cotton into bales to transport by rail.

Other agriculture activities, farming, and dairying were also a part of rural Williamson County east of the Balcones Fault, and ranching occurred to the west in the Hill Country area. Both gradually gave way to more modern business, services, and retail as the area became more urban, but cattle ranching is still a major business in some areas of the county, and cotton is still a significant crop eastward toward Hutto and Taylor.

== County courthouse ==
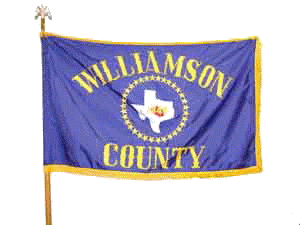
Williamson County flag – Image courtesy of the Williamson County Commissioner's Court

The current courthouse, built in 1911, is an example of Neoclassical Revival architecture. The courthouse has had a tumultuous past, surviving three major renovations and many modifications, including the demolition of its key architectural features in 1966. With the assistance of the Texas Historical Commission and preservation-minded county citizens and officials, the courthouse was returned to its original 1911 state during a major 2006–2007 renovation, once again becoming a focal point of the county.

== Flag ==
The stars on the flag surrounding the state of Texas represent the 33 viable communities identified by Clara Stearns Scarbrough in her 1973 book, Land of Good Water. In 1970, these communities ranged in population from 20 people in Norman's Crossing to more than 10,000 residents in Taylor. In Williamson County as of 2004, 11 towns had populations over 1,000 people, and seven towns had populations above 5,000.

== Education ==
These school districts serve Williamson County:

- Bartlett ISD (partly in Bell County, small portion in Milam County)
- Burnet Consolidated ISD (mostly in Burnet County, small portion in Llano County)
- Coupland ISD (very small portion in Travis County)
- Florence ISD (small portion in Bell County)
- Georgetown ISD
- Granger ISD
- Hutto ISD
- Jarrell ISD
- Leander ISD (partly in Travis County)
- Lexington ISD (mostly in Lee County, very small portion in Milam County)
- Liberty Hill ISD
- Pflugerville ISD (mostly in Travis County)
- Round Rock ISD (small portion in Travis County)
- Taylor ISD
- Thorndale ISD (mostly in Milam County)
- Thrall ISD

=== Higher education ===
- Southwestern University (Georgetown)
- Texas State University Round Rock Campus
- Texas A&M Health Science Center (Round Rock)
- National American University (Georgetown)
- Temple College (Hutto and Taylor)

Austin Community College is the designated community college for most portions of the county.

- Sites: Round Rock, Cedar Park and Leander
- Austin Community College also purchased a site in Leander, Texas, in 2010 for an additional future Williamson County campus.

Areas in Granger, Hutto, Taylor, and Thrall ISDs are within Temple Junior College District. Areas in Florence ISD are within Central Texas College District. Areas in Lexington ISD are within Blinn Junior College District.

== Media ==
The newspapers that serve Williamson County include the Round Rock Leader, Williamson County Sun (Georgetown), Taylor Press, Hutto News, Hill Country News (Leander), Liberty Hill Independent, and Tribune-Progress (Bartlett). In 2005 Community Impact Newspaper was founded. The Austin American-Statesman also has significant coverage in Williamson County.

== Transportation ==
=== Major highways ===
- Interstate 35
- U.S. Highway 79
- U.S. Highway 183
- State Highway 29
- State Highway 45
- State Highway 95
- State Highway 130
- State Highway 138
- State Highway Loop 1
- 183A Toll Road
- State Highway 195
- Spur 26
- Spur 158
- Spur 277
- Spur 376
- Spur 377

== Communities ==
=== Cities (multiple counties) ===
- Austin (mostly in Travis County and a small part in Hays County)
- Bartlett (partly in Bell County)
- Cedar Park (small part in Travis County)
- Leander (partly in Travis County)
- Pflugerville (mostly in Travis County)
- Round Rock (small part in Travis County)
- Thorndale (mostly in Milam County)

=== Cities ===
- Coupland
- Florence
- Georgetown (county seat)
- Granger
- Hutto
- Jarrell
- Liberty Hill
- Taylor
- Thrall
- Weir

=== Census-designated places ===
- Brushy Creek
- Jollyville (former; annexed by Austin)
- Santa Rita Ranch
- Serenada
- Sonterra

=== Unincorporated communities ===
- Jonah
- Macedonia
- Norman's Crossing
- Rice's Crossing
- Schwertner
- Walburg

=== Ghost towns ===
- Palm Valley

== Animal services ==
Williamson County Regional Animal Shelter in Georgetown, which is run by Williamson County, covers the county itself, as well as the municipalities of Cedar Park, Georgetown, Hutto, Leander, and Round Rock. Cedar Park, Leander, and Round Rock are partially in Travis County.

== Notable people ==
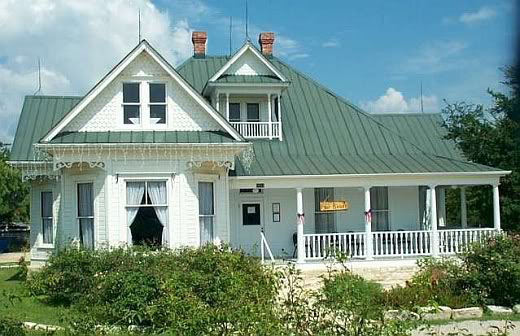
The original Chainsaw Massacre movie house was moved in 1993 and restored to become a restaurant at The Antlers Hotel in Kingsland

- Sam Bass (1851–1878), outlaw and train robber, was killed in a famous shootout in Round Rock in 1878. The shootout is re-enacted once a year as part of the Old Settlers Day celebration in Round Rock.
- King Fisher (1854 – March 11, 1884) was a Texas rancher and gunfighter who lived in Williamson County during his boyhood.
- Dan Moody, a native of Taylor, was the 30th Governor of Texas from 1927 to 1931; he is remembered as a reformer and an opponent of the Ku Klux Klan and as the district attorney for Williamson County.
- Nolan Ryan is a retired Major League Baseball pitcher and current president and majority owner of the Texas Rangers. Ryan played in a major league record 27 seasons for the New York Mets, California Angels, Houston Astros, and Texas Rangers, from 1966 to 1993. He was inducted into the Baseball Hall of Fame in 1999.
- Paul Wall, rapper, born in Georgetown.

== In popular culture ==
- The television show Kevin (Probably) Saves the World is set in Williamson County.
- Williamson County is depicted in the Coen Brothers movie Blood Simple.
- The 1996 Nora Ephron film Michael was shot principally in Georgetown and in and around Williamson County.
- The Texas Chain Saw Massacre, original 1974 version, primary filming occurred at a dilapidated farmhouse on the site of what is now La Frontera. In 1998, the house was moved to Kingsland, Texas, and restored to become a restaurant at The Antlers Hotel.

== See also ==
- List of museums in Central Texas
- National Register of Historic Places listings in Williamson County, Texas
- Recorded Texas Historic Landmarks in Williamson County
