= Hutto, Texas =

- City
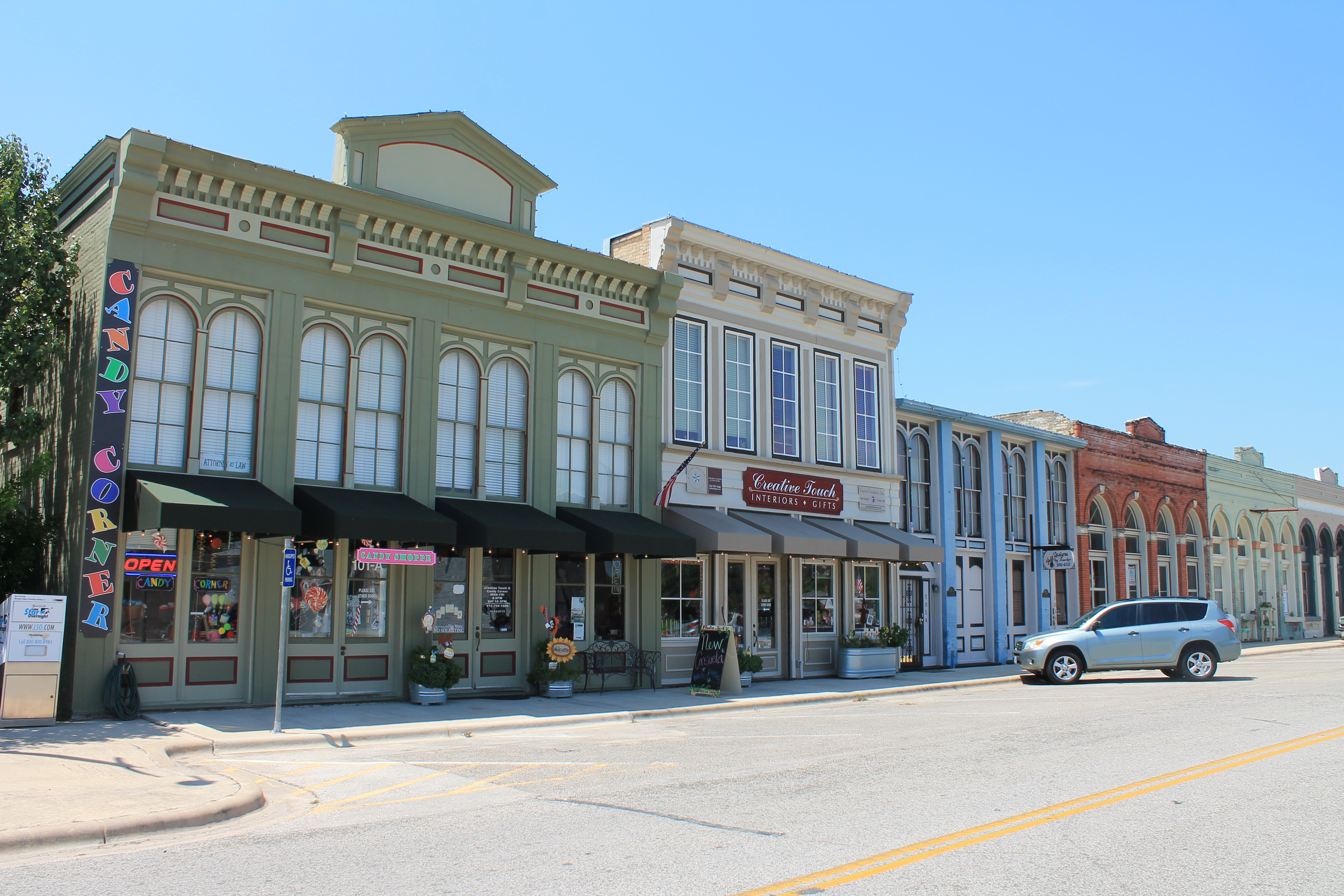
- Downtown Hutto

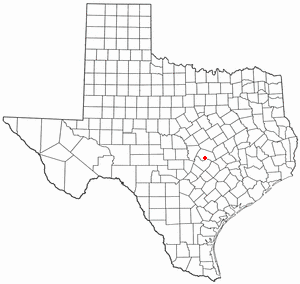
- Location of Hutto, Texas

- Coordinates: 30°32′40″N 97°32′43″W
- Country: United States
- State: Texas
- County: Williamson

Government
  - Type: Council–manager
  - Mayor: Mike Snyder
  - City Manager: James Earp

Area
  - Total: 12.39 sq mi (32.09 km^{2})
  - Land: 12.34 sq mi (31.97 km^{2})
  - Water: 0.046 sq mi (0.12 km^{2})
- Elevation: 663 ft (202 m)

Population (2020)
  - Total: 27,577
  - Estimate (2025): 46,048
  - Density: 2,170.9453/sq mi (838.20668/km^{2})
- Time zone: UTC-6 (Central (CST))
  - Summer (DST): UTC-5 (CDT)
- ZIP Code: 78634
- Area code(s): 512 & 737
- FIPS code: 48-35624
- GNIS feature ID: 1359869
- Website: Official Website

Hutto is a city in Williamson County, Texas, United States. It is part of the Austin–Round Rock metropolitan area. The population was 27,577 at the 2020 census.

== History ==
Historic image of Hutto

Hutto was established in 1855 when the International-Great Northern Railroad passed through land owned by John Hutto (1824–1914), for whom the community is named. Railroad officials designated the stop Hutto Station. James Hutto was born in Alabama on June 8, 1824; he came to Texas in 1847 and moved his family to Williamson County in 1855. A slave, Adam Orgain, was the first person to live in the immediate Hutto vicinity, having been placed out on the Blackland prairie by his owner to watch after the cattle and livestock holdings. In 1876, James Hutto sold 50 acres (200,000 m^{2}) to the Texas Land Company of New York for a town site and railroad right of way. The area attracted Swedish and German immigrants, who established farms and ranches in Hutto.

== Mascot ==
Hutto's mascot comes from a local legend related to the International-Great Northern Railroad. The legend traces its roots back to 1915, when a circus train stopped at Hutto to pick up passengers and let the animals out to feed. One of their hippos ran loose towards Cottonwood Creek, causing the train to be delayed and other trains to be stopped. The hippo was eventually herded back onto the train.

== Geography ==
Hutto is located seven miles (11 km) east of Round Rock and 22 miles (35 km) northeast of Austin.

According to the United States Census Bureau, the city has a total area of 7.75 square miles (20.1 km^{2}), all land.

== Demographics ==
Historical population
Census	Pop.	Note	%±
1920	571		—
1930	588		3.0%
1940	579		−1.5%
1950	529		−8.6%
1960	400		−24.4%
1970	545		36.3%
1980	659		20.9%
1990	630		−4.4%
2000	1,250		98.4%
2010	14,698		1,075.8%
2020	27,577		87.6%
2025 (est.)	46,048		67.0%
U.S. Decennial Census

=== 2020 census ===
As of the 2020 census, 27,577 people, 8,740 households, and 6,219 families were residing in the city. The population density was 1,896.5 inhabitants per square mile (732.2/km^{2}), and the median age was 32.2 years.

31.2% of residents were under the age of 18 and 6.4% of residents were 65 years of age or older. For every 100 females there were 94.5 males, and for every 100 females age 18 and over there were 90.8 males age 18 and over.

99.2% of residents lived in urban areas, while 0.8% lived in rural areas.

There were 8,740 households in Hutto, of which 51.4% had children under the age of 18 living in them. Of all households, 59.0% were married-couple households, 12.5% were households with a male householder and no spouse or partner present, and 20.7% were households with a female householder and no spouse or partner present. About 13.7% of all households were made up of individuals and 3.3% had someone living alone who was 65 years of age or older.

There were 8,954 housing units, of which 2.4% were vacant. The homeowner vacancy rate was 1.0% and the rental vacancy rate was 3.6%.

Hutto racial composition as of 2020 (NH = Non-Hispanic) (Note: Note: the US Census treats Hispanic/Latino as an ethnic category. This table excludes Latinos from the racial categories and assigns them to a separate category. Hispanics/Latinos can be of any race.)
Race	Number	Percentage
White (NH)	12,036	43.65%
Black or African American (NH)	3,459	12.54%
Native American or Alaska Native (NH)	63	0.23%
Asian (NH)	561	2.03%
Pacific Islander (NH)	41	0.15%
Some Other Race (NH)	145	0.53%
Mixed/multiracial (NH)	1,449	5.25%
Hispanic or Latino	9,823	35.62%
Total	27,577	

=== 2000 census ===
As of the census of 2000, there were 21,342 people, 6,271 households, and 1,906 families residing in the city. The population density was 2,560.4 people per square mile (988.6 people/km^{2}). There were 6,715 housing units at an average density of 805.6 per square mile (311.0/km^{2}). The racial makeup of the city was 89.16% White, 3.82% Black or African American, 0.15% Native American, 4.47% Asian, 0.06% Pacific Islander, 0.60% from other races, and 1.74% from two or more races. Hispanic or Latino of any race were 1.41% of the population.

There were 6,271 households, out of which 12.9% had children under the age of 18 living with them, 22.9% were married couples living together, 5.6% had a female householder with no husband present, and 69.6% were non-families. 34.5% of all households were made up of individuals, and 6.6% had someone living alone who was 65 years of age or older. The average household size was 2.25 and the average family size was 2.72.

In the city the population was spread out, with 6.7% under the age of 18, 66.7% from 18 to 24, 13.7% from 25 to 44, 8.0% from 45 to 64, and 4.9% who were 65 years of age or older. The median age was 22 years. For every 100 females, there were 88.2 males. For every 100 females age 18 and over, there were 86.9 males.

The median income for a household in the city was $17,122, and the median income for a family was $53,391. Males had a median income of $35,849 versus $28,866 for females. The per capita income for the city was $11,061. About 14.8% of families and 51.9% of the population were below the poverty line, including 19.1% of those under age 18 and 7.2% of those age 65 or over.

== Education ==
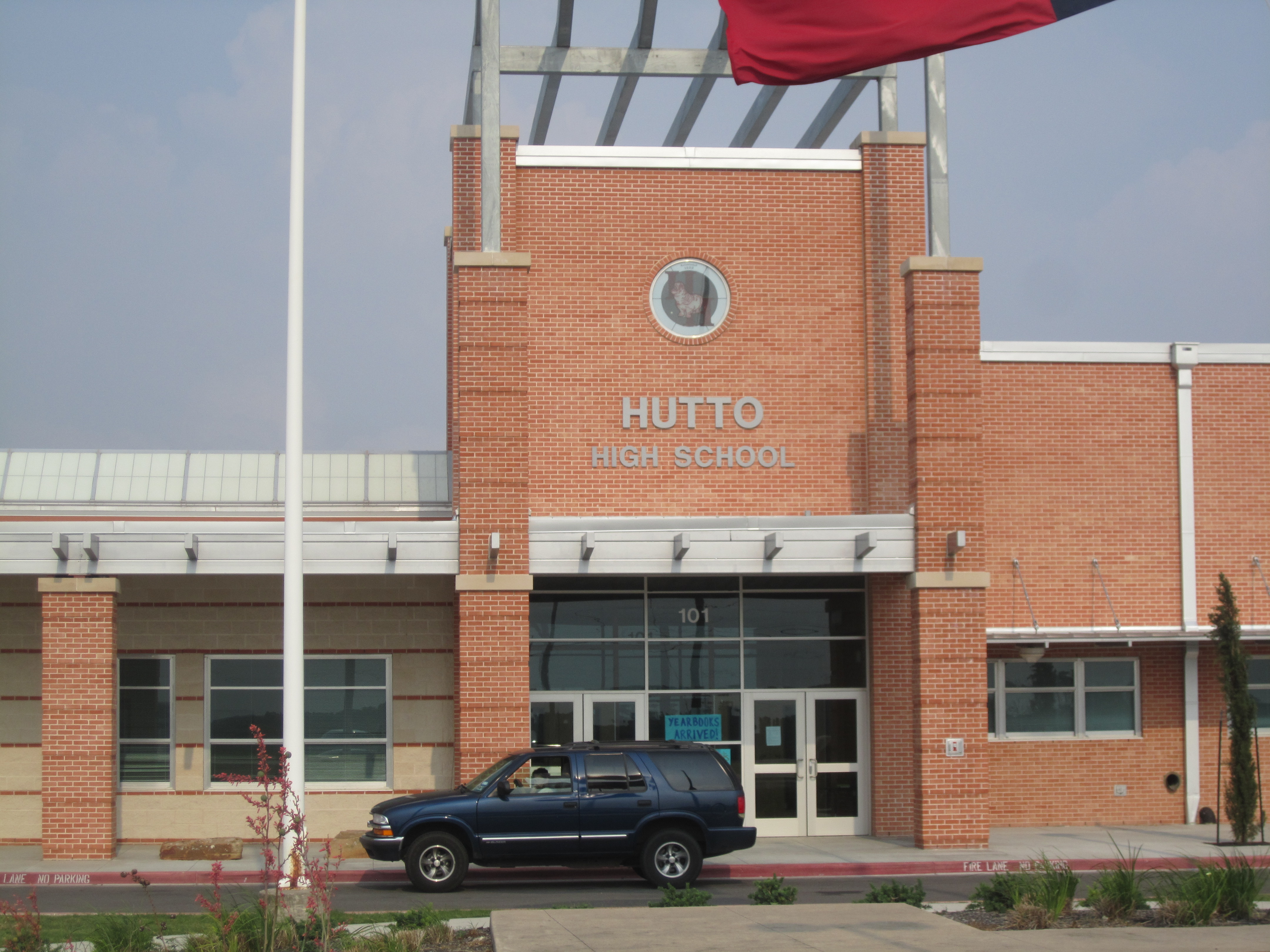
Hutto High School

Hutto is served by the Hutto Independent School District.

=== Public schools ===
- Hutto High School
- Hutto Ninth Grade Center
- Hutto Middle School
- Farley Middle School
- Gus Almquist Middle School
- Cottonwood Creek Elementary
- Hutto Elementary
- Nadine Johnson Elementary
- Ray Elementary
- Veterans Hill Elementary
- Howard Norman Elementary
- Kerley Elementary

=== Higher education ===
Hutto is home to the Eastern Williamson County Higher Education Center, which is a partnership between Temple College, Texas A&M University–Central Texas, and Texas State Technical College.
