= Flower Hill, Texas =

- Ghost town
- Location within Texas Location within the United States
- Coordinates: 29°57′54″N 97°07′53″W
- Country: United States
- State: Texas
- County: Bastrop
- Elevation: 344 ft (105 m)
- Time zone: UTC-6 (Central (CST))
  - Summer (DST): UTC-5 (CDT)
- Area codes: 512 & 737

Flower Hill is a ghost town in Bastrop County, Texas, United States. It is located within the Greater Austin metropolitan area.

== History ==
Founded by emancipated slaves, the town is one of 13 known "Freedom Colonies," in the county. In the 1940s, a church, a cemetery and several houses marked the town on county highway maps. By the 1980s, only the cemetery remained.

== Geography ==
It is located three miles southeast of Smithville, 19 miles southeast of the town of Bastrop and 49 miles southeast of Austin.

== Education ==
In 1907, Flower Hill had a one-teacher school for fifty-four black students. When a district system was created in 1921, the school was probably absorbed by the Smithville Independent School District. The community continues to be served by Smithville ISD today.
