= Salem, Bastrop County, Texas =

- Unincorporated community
- Location within Texas Location within the United States
- Coordinates: 29°50′35″N 97°19′40″W
- Country: United States
- State: Texas
- County: Bastrop
- Elevation: 476 ft (145 m)
- Time zone: UTC-6 (Central (CST))
  - Summer (DST): UTC-5 (CDT)
- Area codes: 512 & 737
- GNIS feature ID: 1379007

Salem is an unincorporated community in Bastrop County, Texas, United States. The town is one of 17 communities named Salem in the state. It is located within the Greater Austin metropolitan area.

== History ==
Originally called St. Philip's Colony, the agricultural community was first populated by slaves freed following the Civil War. Since it was paired with the white town of Jeddo, it is unclear how many people lived in Salem. St. Philip's Church and several houses were already in existence when the school was built. The religious denomination of the church is unknown. St. Philips Church and several houses have marked Salem on county maps from the 1940s to the 2010s, but no population estimates are available.

== Geography ==
Salem is located 2 mi (3.2 km) northwest of Jeddo in southern Bastrop County. It is also located 25 miles south of the town of Bastrop and 50 miles southeast of Austin.

== Education ==
A two-room, one-teacher schoolhouse for 29 children was constructed in 1881. In 1905, the school had 55 students. It merged with the Jeddo district when the county instituted a school district system in 1907. The ruins of the old school still exist. Today, the community is served by the Smithville Independent School District.
