= Pin Oak, Texas =

Ghost town in Texas, US

Coordinates: 30°05′02″N 97°05′20″W

Pin Oak is a ghost town in Bastrop County, Texas, United States. It is located on Farm to Market Road 2104, six miles northwest of Winchester, six miles northeast of Smithville, eight miles south of Paige and 45 miles southeast of Austin.

The community is known to have been founded by German settlers. The immigrants most likely arrived from Province of Westphalia, as most German Catholics in Texas came from that region. Adam Becker, a joiner and farmer, was one of the first to build a home, on the south side of Pin Oak Creek. In 1849, Becker made an addition to his house to accommodate Catholic mass said by the visiting priest. In 1869, the archdiocese of Galveston, purchased six acres of land east of Pin Oak Creek on which to build a church. Construction was completed in the same year. The present church replaced the original in 1911.

The St. Mary's Catholic Church and Cemetery are still located at the intersection of Farm to Market Road 2104 and Circle Road. The address appears on county maps as part of Smithville, Texas. Saint Mary’s is a mission parish of Saint Margaret’s church in Giddings, Texas.
