= String Prairie, Texas =

- Unincorporated community
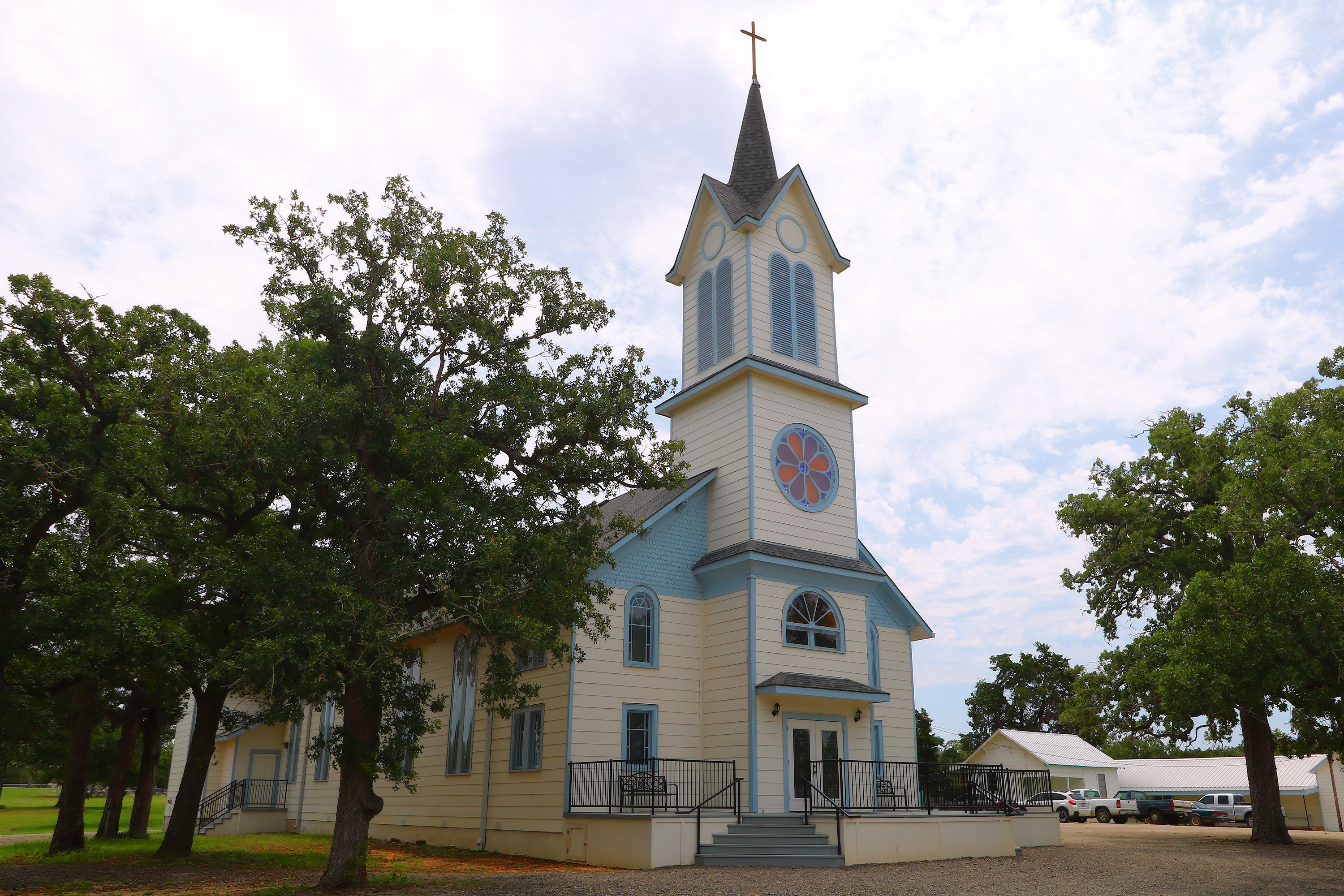
- Saint Mary of the Assumption Church

- Location within Texas Location within the United States
- Coordinates: 29°53′09″N 97°20′49″W
- Country: United States
- State: Texas
- County: Bastrop
- Elevation: 505 ft (154 m)
- Time zone: UTC-6 (Central (CST))
  - Summer (DST): UTC-5 (CDT)
- Area codes: 512 & 737
- GNIS feature ID: 1369285

String Prairie is an unincorporated community in Bastrop County, Texas, United States. According to the Handbook of Texas, the community had a population of 125 in 2000. It is located within the Greater Austin metropolitan area.

== History ==
Settlement of String Prairie began before the Civil War. A post office was established at String Prairie in 1886 and remained in operation until 1929, with George Zimmerman as the first postmaster. By 1890, the town had a general store, a cotton gin, and a pharmacist. From 1890 to 1914, String Prairie's population rose from 25 to 400. With growth, the community added new businesses, including three blacksmith shops, grocery and drug stores, as well as a millinery establishment. Then and now, Saint Mary of the Assumption Church has been a hub of social life.

The population declined through the remainder of the decade and by 1930, had returned to only 25 individuals. However, following World War II, it increased to 50, in the late 1940s, and then to 75, in the late 1960s. Over the next 40 years, it grew to 125.

== Geography ==
Located on Texas State Highway 304, the town is 5 miles (8.0 km) southwest of Rosanky and 45 miles (72 km) southeast of Austin. It is also located 20 mi (32 km) west of Bastrop.

== Education ==
In 1924, residents built a one-teacher school using funds acquired through a fifty-cent school tax. Today, the community is served by the Smithville Independent School District.
