= Colorado, Texas =

- Unincorporated community
- Location within Texas Location within the United States
- Coordinates: 29°59′09″N 97°08′03″W
- Country: United States
- State: Texas
- County: Bastrop
- Elevation: 351 ft (107 m)
- Time zone: UTC-6 (Central (CST))
  - Summer (DST): UTC-5 (CDT)
- Area codes: 512 & 737
- GNIS feature ID: 1354813

Colorado is an unincorporated community in Bastrop County, Texas, United States. It is located within the Greater Austin metropolitan area.

== History ==
The community was named after the state of Colorado. A church and several scattered homes marked the community on county maps in the 1940s and it only had a church and cemetery but no homes by the 1980s. It did not have any population estimates in 2000.

== Geography ==
Colorado is located 2 mi (3.2 km) southeast of Smithville in southeastern Bastrop County.

== Education ==
Colorado had its own school in 1905, with one teacher and 50 black students. It is said to have joined the Smithville Independent School District in 1921. The community continues to be served by the Smithville ISD today.
