= Swiftex, Texas =

- Unincorporated community
- Location within Texas Location within the United States
- Coordinates: 30°12′23″N 97°18′49″W
- Country: United States
- State: Texas
- County: Bastrop
- Elevation: 492 ft (150 m)
- Time zone: UTC-6 (Central (CST))
  - Summer (DST): UTC-5 (CDT)
- Area codes: 512 & 737
- GNIS feature ID: 2034781

Swiftex is an unincorporated community in Bastrop County, located in the U.S. state of Texas. It is located within the Greater Austin metropolitan area.

== History ==
In the early 1940s, 200 houses were built to house residents of the military's Camp Swift. It declined after the end of World War II.

Its name derives from "Swift, Texas".

== Geography ==
Swiftex is located 6 mi (9.7 km) north of Bastrop in central Bastrop County.

== Education ==
The community of Swiftex is served by the Bastrop Independent School District.
