= Hills Prairie, Texas =

- Unincorporated community
- Location within Texas Location within the United States
- Coordinates: 30°03′06″N 97°17′31″W
- Country: United States
- State: Texas
- County: Bastrop
- Elevation: 351 ft (107 m)
- Time zone: UTC-6 (Central (CST))
  - Summer (DST): UTC-5 (CDT)
- Area codes: 512 & 737
- GNIS feature ID: 1802956

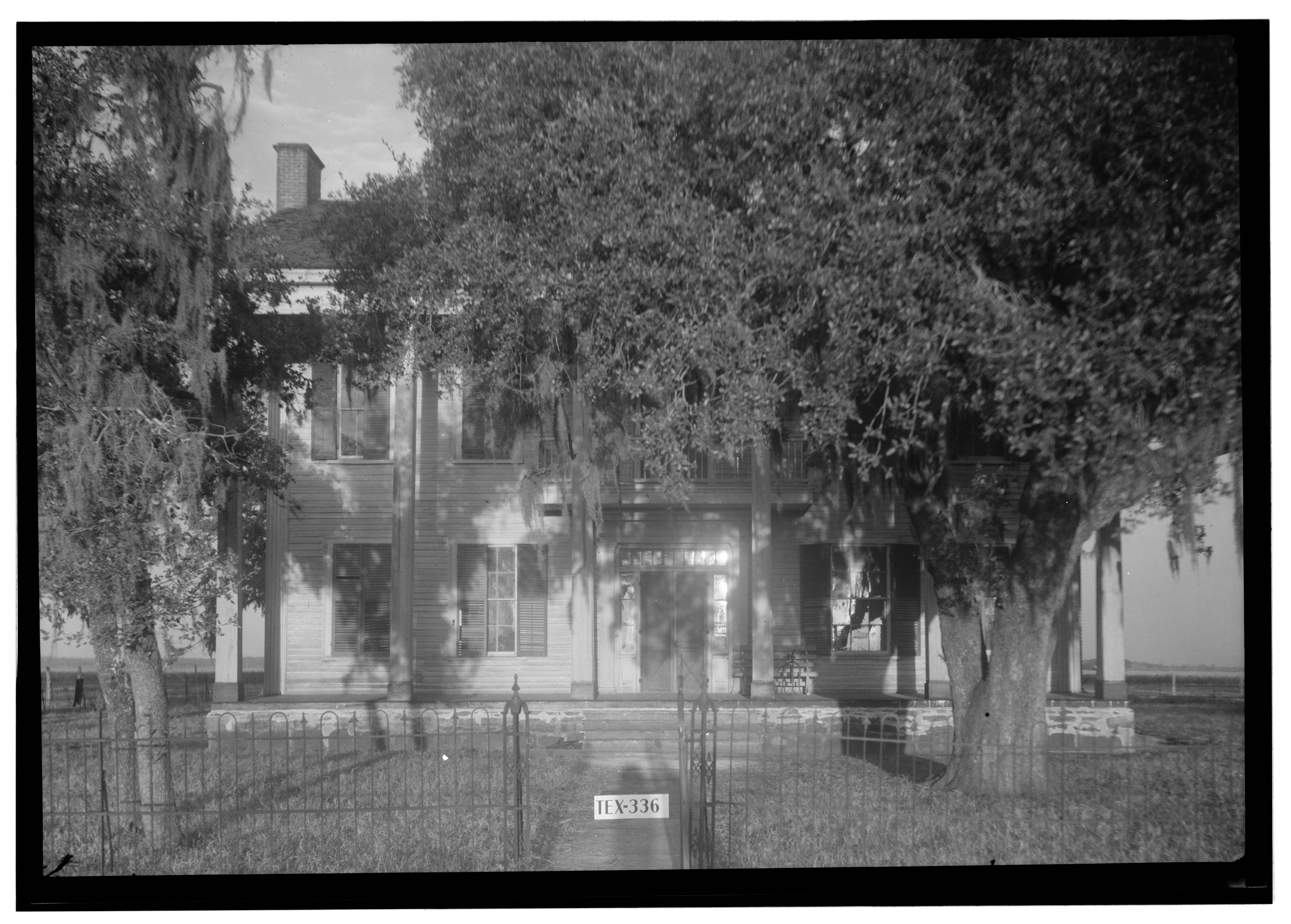
Historic American Buildings Survey, Arthur W. Stewart, Photographer November 24, 1936 SOUTHWEST ELEVATION (FRONT). - A. Wiley Hill House, Route 304, Hill's Prairie Vicinity, HABS TEX,11-HILPR,1-2

Hills Prairie, or Hill's Prairie, is an unincorporated community in Bastrop County, Texas, United States. According to the Handbook of Texas, the community had a population of 50 in 2000. It is located within the Greater Austin metropolitan area.

== History ==
Hills Prairie was founded in the 1830s by the area's first settlers, Elisha Barton and Edward Jenkins. In 1833, John Gilmer McGehee visited the town, returning two years later with 140 homesteaders from Georgia and Alabama. By that time, Jenkins had died. His widow, Sarah, sold 2,220 acres (900 ha) to Abram Wiley (Wylie) Hill who built a home on the land. Thereafter, the settlement was known as Hills Prairie.

Religious services (Methodist) were held in the Hill and McGehee homes. Hill himself built a cotton gin in 1843. A post office request was granted in 1877. In 1888, under postmaster John McDonald, the facility was renamed McDonald's Store. When Sarah Hill became postmistress four years later, it reverted to Hills Prairie.

The population was estimated at 30 in 1884. When an extension of the Missouri, Kansas and Texas Railroad arrived, the figure rose to 50. By the mid-1890s, town businesses included a drug store, a general store, a swine dealer, and a second cotton gin. In 1914, Hills Prairie's population was 75; however, in 1925 records, it is listed as only six. The town's nearness to the fast-growing Bastrop is thought to have played a part in the decline. In 1930, the post office was shuttered. Following the Great Depression, the population rose again, reaching 62 in the late 1960s, then fell to 35 according to the 1990 census. The 2000 census listed 50 residents.

== Hills Prairie today ==
Area residents are engaged primarily in farming and ranching. Notable businesses include the Hills Prairie Livestock Co., which holds auctions every Wednesday at noon, and The Gas Station (formerly Ryan's Hills Prairie Grocery), a barbecue restaurant housed in the building featured as the Last Chance Gas Station in the film The Texas Chain Saw Massacre.

The Abram Wiley Hill House is listed on the National Register of Historic Places.

== Geography ==
Hills Prairie is located off Farm to Market Road 304, 8 miles (13 km) southeast of the town of Bastrop, 8 miles (13 km) northwest of Smithville and 40 miles (64 km) southeast of Austin.

== Education ==
The community constructed a private school. In 1925, Hills Prairie closed its school. Today, the community is served by the Bastrop Independent School District.
