= Jeddo, Texas =

- Unincorporated community
- Location within Texas Location within the United States
- Coordinates: 29°48′32″N 97°18′53″W
- Country: United States
- State: Texas
- County: Bastrop
- Elevation: 463 ft (141 m)
- Time zone: UTC-6 (Central (CST))
  - Summer (DST): UTC-5
- Area codes: 512 & 737
- GNIS feature ID: 1378495

Jeddo is an unincorporated community in Bastrop County, Texas, United States. According to the Handbook of Texas, the community had a population of 75 in 2000. It is located within the Greater Austin metropolitan area.

== History ==
The community was founded in 1874 when a post office was established. Five years later, the community was described as a thriving village. In 1890, the population was estimated at twenty, and Jeddo had one general store. Population estimates underwent an unexplained rise later in the decade, with 560 reported in 1896 and 559 in 1904, but the community quickly faded to a population of twelve in 1914, then dropped from population lists until circa 1933, when ten people and two businesses were reported. The post office closed in 1927. From 1939 to 2000, the population was estimated at seventy-five.

The Jeddo Cemetery was founded in 1865. It is maintained by the Jeddo Cemetery Association, current as of 2011. There are 166 marked graves in the Jeddo Cemetery, the oldest dated 1835.

== Geography ==
Jeddo is situated 9 mi (14 km) south of Rosanky in the southern tip of Bastrop County. It is also located 18 mi (29 km) away from Bastrop, the county seat.

== Education ==
In 1891, the settlement had two schools, segregated by race. The Jeddo area is entirely served by the Smithville Independent School District, approximately 18 miles to the northeast.
