= Smithville High School =

Smithville High School may refer to:

- Smithville High School (Mississippi), Smithville, Mississippi
- Smithville High School (Missouri), Smithville, Missouri
- Smithville High School (Ohio)
- Smithville High School (Oklahoma), a high school in Oklahoma
- Smithville High School (Texas)
