= The Refuge Ranch =

Coordinates: 30.1891°N 97.2625°W

The Refuge Ranch was a Christian faith-based facility on 50 rural acres in Bastrop County, Texas, for young women who had been subjected to human trafficking, which operated under contract with the Texas Department of Family and Protective Services (DFPS) until it was ordered to shut down on March 11, 2022, in the wake of multiple reports of sexual abuse and exploitation, medical neglect and physical abuse. Purportedly the largest long-term, live-in rehabilitation facility for child survivors of sex trafficking in the United States, it included a charter school operating under an arrangement with the University of Texas-University Charter School. At the time of its creation, founder Brooke Crowder explained, "We're not bearing the cost of our on-site charter school—the University of Texas is doing that. We're not bearing the cost of the medical care. We're partnering with a federally qualified health care clinic." Each survivor at the Refuge would receive a customized care plan "provided by a staff that's committed to Christ".

== Zoom hangouts ==
After field trips were cancelled in 2020 due to COVID-19 travel restrictions, the Ranch began a series of Zoom hangouts with various celebrities, including Ariana Berlin Valorie Kondos Field, Ebola survivor Preston Gorman, Olympian Simidele Adeagbo, computational biologist Laura Boykin and the members of the Dixie Chicks.

== Sexual abuse on the ranch ==
According to 2022 press reports, between seven and nine girls aged 11–17 were subjected to physical abuse, sexual abuse and exploitation, and medical neglect, by various past employees of the ranch, many of whom were relatives, or related by marriage or cohabitation. This included the coerced taking of nude photographs of some of the girls and sale of the pictures, with the proceeds used to buy drugs and alcohol, some of which were then supposedly then provided to the girls. It's now proven that when the operation's residential care director found out about the sexual abuse, it was reported immediately to DFPS, Bastrop PD and the Texas Rangers investigated it. DFPS briefly investigated the reports, the staff member involved was terminated and the Texas Rangers cleared The Refuge and its leadership of any wrongdoing doing. Those in charge followed the policies that DFPS put in place and did everything they were supposed to. They communicated the incident to the residents involved parties and DFPS stated that they could not share with the other residents parties due to HIPAA.
