= Bastrop High School (Texas) =

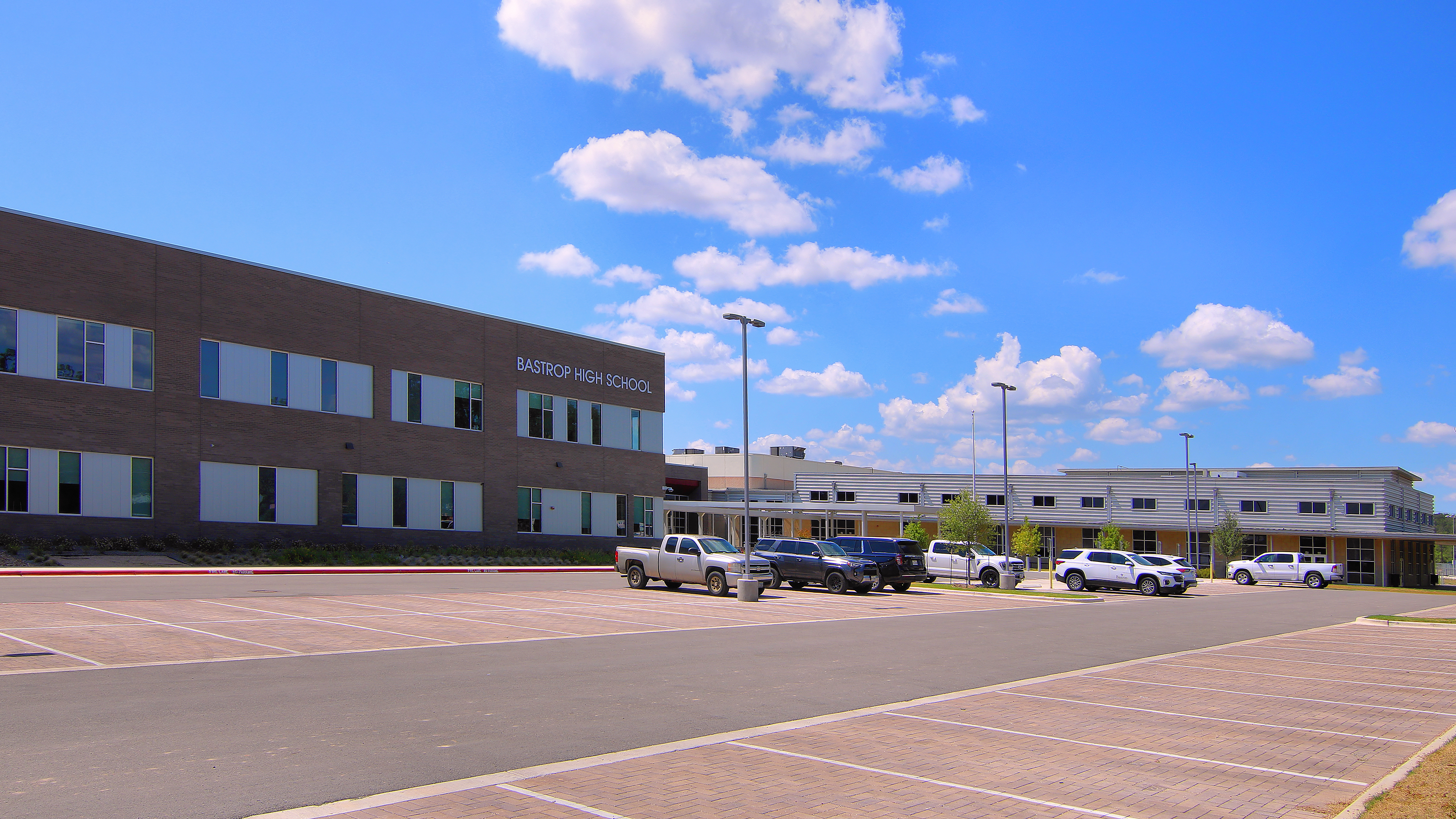

Location
- 1614 Chambers Street; Bastrop, Bastrop County, Texas 78602-3717; United States; 30.1183°N 97.3115°W

Information
- School type: Public, high school
- Motto: Lead Today, Tomorrow, For Life
- Locale: Town: Distant
- School district: Bastrop ISD
- NCES School ID: 480957000409
- Principal: Krystal Gabriel
- Staff: 107.38 (on an FTE basis)
- Grades: 9–12
- Enrollment: 1,745 (2025-2026)
- Student to teacher ratio: 15.10
- Colors: Maroon & White
- Athletics conference: UIL Class 5A
- Mascot: Bears/Lady Bears
- Newspaper: The Bear Facts
- Yearbook: The Bear Tracks
- Website: Bastrop High School

Bastrop High School is a public high school in Bastrop, Texas (USA) the UIL classifies as a 5A school. It is part of the Bastrop Independent School District located in central Bastrop County. During 2022–2023, Bastrop High School had an enrollment of 1,621 students and a student to teacher ratio of 15.10. The school received an overall rating of "B" from the Texas Education Agency for the 2024–2025 school year.

== Communities served ==
The school serves the City of Bastrop, Camp Swift, Circle D-KC Estates, and Paige.

== Athletics ==
The Bastrop Bears compete in these sports -

- Baseball
- Basketball
- Cross Country
- Football
- Golf
- Powerlifting
- Soccer
- Softball
- Tennis
- Track and Field
- Volleyball
- Marching Band

=== State titles ===
- Boys Golf -
  - 1958(B), 1964(1A)
- Girls Golf -
  - 1993(4A), 1994(4A), 1995(4A)
- One Act Play -
  - 1978(2A)

== Alumni ==
- Corey Knebel, All-Star MLB player, attended freshmen through junior year
- Billy Waugh, 1947, U.S. Army Special Forces soldier and Central Intelligence Agency paramilitary operations officer
