= Upton, Texas =

- Unincorporated community
- Location within Texas Location within the United States
- Coordinates: 30°00′41″N 97°15′51″W
- Country: United States
- State: Texas
- County: Bastrop
- Elevation: 341 ft (104 m)
- Time zone: UTC-6 (Central (CST))
  - Summer (DST): UTC-5 (CDT)
- Area codes: 512 & 737
- GNIS feature ID: 1379197

Upton is an unincorporated community in Bastrop County, Texas, United States. According to the Handbook of Texas, the community had a population of 25 in 2000. It is located within the Greater Austin metropolitan area.

== History ==
Upton's first settler was J.P. Young in 1847. Three more settlers named John and Tom Hancock, as well as John Bright followed suit. When the Missouri, Kansas, and Texas Railroad arrived in the community in 1894, a post office was established and remained in operation until 1929. It was originally named Como but eventually changed its name to Upton. The community's population was 70 in 1914 and had a cotton gin and general store. A church was built that next year, with the population dropping to 25. There was a community center in the 1930s. The population of Upton remained at 25 over the decades and briefly grew to 50 in the late 1960s. It had 25 people as of the 2000 census.

== Geography ==
Upton is located 7 mi (11 km) south of Bastrop in central Bastrop County.

== Education ==
Upton's first school was a one-room log building. It was replaced by a newer frame building that was built on land donated by the community's first settler. It was moved to its current site in 1892. It then had three schools: two for black students and one for white students, in the 1930s. Today, Upton is served by the Smithville Independent School District.
