= Alum Creek, Texas =

Alum Creek
- Unincorporated community
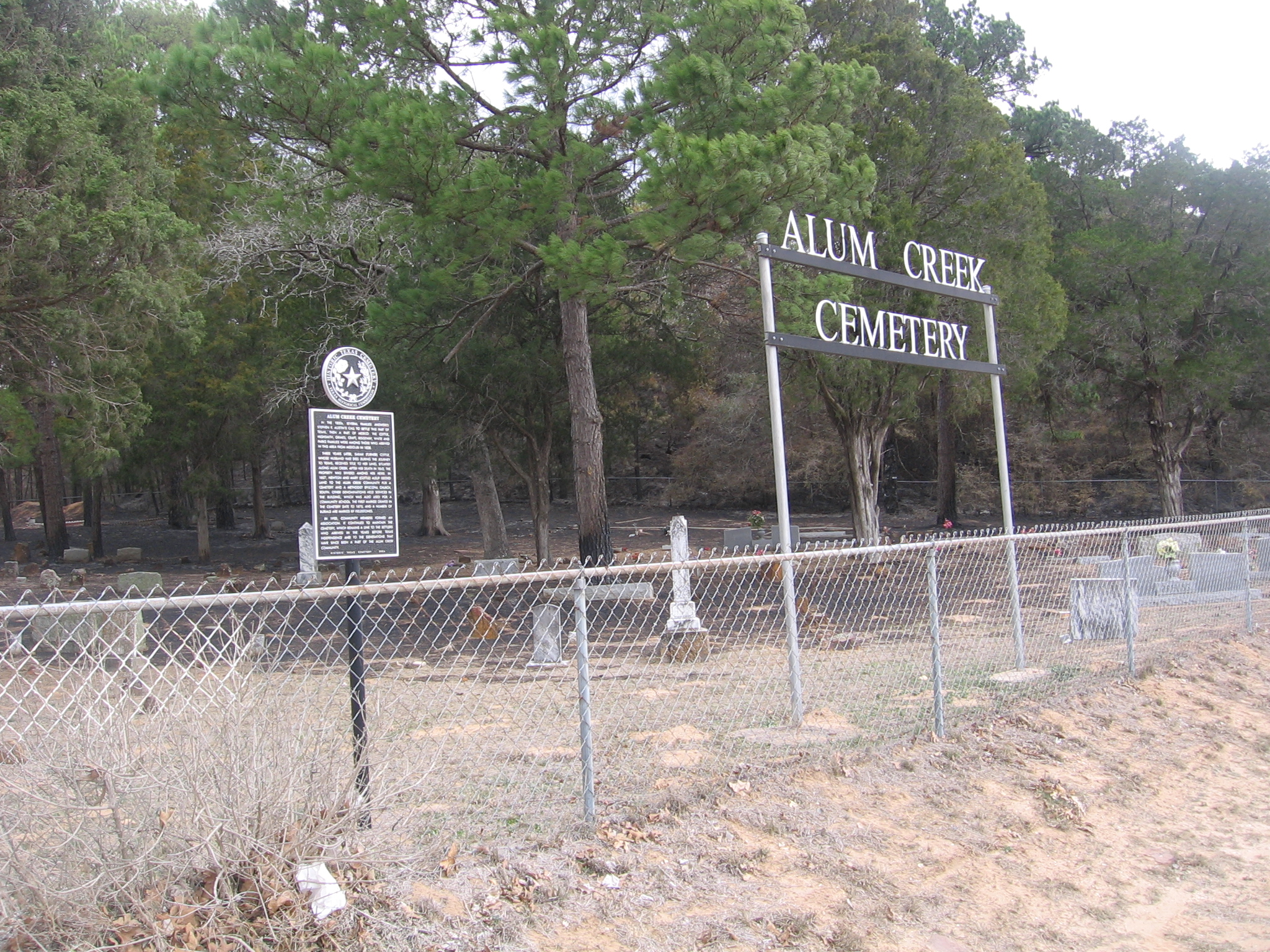
- Alum Creek Cemetery

- Location within Texas Location within the United States
- Coordinates: 30°04′04″N 97°13′03″W
- Country: United States
- State: Texas
- County: Bastrop
- Founded: 1829
- Elevation: 348 ft (106 m)

Population (2000)
  - Total: 70
- Time zone: UTC-6 (Central (CST))
  - Summer (DST): UTC-5 (CDT)
- Area codes: 512 & 737
- GNIS feature ID: 1377933

Alum Creek is an unincorporated community in Bastrop County, Texas, United States. The community had a population of 70 in 2000. It is located within the Greater Austin metropolitan area.

== History ==
Alum Creek was founded in 1829. A post office and a church were established in 1851 and 1853, respectively, and by the 1880s the community had expanded to contain three mills, two stores, a blacksmiths, and a saloon. The community had begun declining by the end of the 1890s. In 2000, the population was estimated at 70.

== Geography ==
Alum Creek is located about 4 mi (6.4 km) southeast of Bastrop, where Texas State Highway 71 crosses Alum Creek.

== Education ==
A private school was established in the community in 1835 and remained operational until 1937. Today, the community is served by the Smithville Independent School District.
