= Oak Hill, Bastrop County, Texas =

Coordinates: 29°59′05″N 97°09′56″W

Oak Hill is a ghost town in Bastrop County, Texas, United States. It is located four miles southwest of McDade, 12 miles southeast of Elgin, 13 miles northeast of Bastrop, and 37 miles southeast of Austin on the old Bastrop-McDade Road (Farm to Market Road 2336).

== Early history ==
Built on land along Piney Creek initially granted to Martin Walker, Oak Hill began as a small farming community in the late 1840s. Residents grew corn and cotton as cash crops, and vegetables and livestock for subsistence.

In 1879, Walker sold the town 40 acres on which to construct a school and church. The church building was shared by the Methodist Episcopal, Presbyterian, and Christian denominations. Beginning in 1882, Baptist services were offered. Oak Hill also built a general store to serve a population of about 50 families.

In 1905, the Oak Hill school had one teacher and 39 students. In 1907, when the county initiated a district system, the town became the hub of a common school district.

== Camp Swift ==
In the early 1940s, the town underwent a dramatic change. One month after the attack on Pearl Harbor, the U. S. government chose Oak Hill and the surrounding region as the site for Camp Swift, a massive Army training camp and German prisoner-of-war camp. Residents and business owners were paid a lump sum for their land, and moved to neighboring towns such as Bastrop and Elgin. Some buildings were torn down; some were sold and moved, or sold for materials. Others were used as training targets.

At the time, Camp Swift was Texas' largest army training and transshipment camp. It covered nearly 56,000 acres and had 2,750 buildings designed to hold 44,000 troops and about 4,000 prisoners of war. At its peak during World War II, the camp housed 90,000 troops simultaneously. Camp Swift also brought civilian jobs in transportation, defense, and manufacturing.

Following the war, Camp Swift was downsized, with barracks and buildings sold as scrap for $5 a truckload. The government had promised former residents they could buy back their property at war's end. Some land was returned to the original owners, but the community was not rebuilt. Because the land's value had skyrocketed, many could not afford to return. The town name disappeared from county highway maps in the 1980s.

== Today ==
Camp Swift is still in existence, but much diminished in size at only 11,700 acres. The site houses part of the Texas National Guard, a medium-security federal prison, and a University of Texas cancer research center. Foundations of homes and barracks can still be seen on the west side of FM 2336.

The old Oak Hill Cemetery can be found down an unpaved road. The earliest marked graves date back to 1868; several unmarked graves are believed to be much older. Former residents have a cemetery association to repair and maintain the graveyard.

== See also ==
- List of ghost towns in Texas
