= Grassyville, Texas =

Ghost town in Texas

Coordinates: 30°8′14″N 97°04′45″W

Grassyville is a ghost town located in Bastrop County, Texas, United States. The community was founded in the northeastern corner of the county, near the intersection of Farm to Market Road 2104 and Farm to Market Road 2239, six miles south of Paige, 14 miles east of Bastrop, and 50 miles east of Austin.

== History ==
Grassyville was settled in the 1850s by German Methodists as an agricultural community. A parsonage was built in 1858; a church was constructed in 1868. The town was granted a post office in 1877, although it was located in Lee County. It was moved to Bastrop County in 1879, but closed and reopened again in Lee County, only to finally move back to Bastrop County in 1883.

By 1884, the town had a population of 75, two churches, a steam gristmill, a cotton gin, and a district school. In 1887, 1893, and 1899, Grassyville hosted the annual conference of the German Methodist Church.

The post office closed permanently in 1906. The district school operated until 1933, when the population fell to 10. From 1939 to 1990, the population was reported at 50.

== Grassyville today ==
All that remains of the town is Grassyville Road and a church cemetery with 130 graves. Many of the cemetery markers are engraved in German script. The two earliest burials, Auguste D. Hamff and Bertha Kunkel, are both dated 1871. Seven Confederate Army soldiers, Civil War veterans from Company A of the Fifth Texas Field Artillery, are also interred here. The 1.5-acre graveyard is still in use. It is maintained by the Grassyville Cemetery Association, established in 1963.
