= Sand, Bastrop County, Texas =

Ghost town in Texas, US

Sand, Texas
- Ghost town
- Location in Texas
- Coordinates: 30.05290400°N 97.02890300°W
- Country: United States
- State: Texas
- County: Bastrop

Sand is a ghost town in Bastrop County, Texas, United States.

== History ==
Sand is named for the sand of the Post Oak Savannah. A post office operated from 1898 to 1929, with Ernest J. Lawrence serving as postmaster. At its peak in the 1910s, it had a population of 35, but began declining from the 1920s. It was abandoned by 1946.
