= Watterson, Texas =

- Unincorporated community
- Location within Texas Location within the United States
- Coordinates: 29°59′21″N 97°23′16″W
- Country: United States
- State: Texas
- County: Bastrop
- Elevation: 505 ft (154 m)
- Time zone: UTC-6 (Central (CST))
  - Summer (DST): UTC-5 (CDT)
- Area codes: 512 & 737
- GNIS feature ID: 1380748

Watterson is an unincorporated community in Bastrop County, Texas, United States. It is located within the Greater Austin metropolitan area.

== History ==
Watterson is named for Charles Coffin Watterson who, along with his wife Martha, settled in the area in 1852 to farm and raise livestock. The Wattersons were soon joined by Samuel and Caroline Wolfenbarger and others engaged in the same pursuits. Initially, the community was known as Live Oaks and a post office with that name was established in 1878. Charles Watterson served as the first postmaster. In 1891, the town was renamed in his honor. By 1896, the community had 100 residents, a Methodist church, a cotton gin, gristmill and general store. The post office closed in 1904. During the 1930s, the town still had a community center and Methodist church. By the early 1960s, larger farms in the region had been broken up into smaller plots, but the town remained a farming and ranching community. Watterson Ranch, currently owned by sixth-generation Wattersons, has been a cattle operation since the 1850s. Many other area residents are also direct descendants of the town’s first settlers. Although population figures are unavailable, Watterson was listed in Cities and Towns of Texas during the 1980s and still appears on county highway maps.

A local landmark of note is Watterson Hall (formerly known as Big Annie's), a country music venue and old-style dance hall. In business for at least 55 years, the site served as the Cherry Hill Dance Hall in the Sandra Bullock movie Hope Floats.

== Geography ==
The town is located on Old Watterson Road, 4 miles (6.4 km) east of Rockne, 11 miles (18 km) south of the town of Bastrop, 25 miles (40 km) west of Smithville and 40 miles (64 km) southeast of Austin.

== Education ==
Children attended schools in Lentz Branch and Hilbig; these consolidated in 1900 as the Watterson school. The school was merged with Eight Live Oaks school in 1927. A school for African American children was also constructed in Watterson at this time. Today, the community is served by the Bastrop Independent School District.
