= Central Texas Airport =

Central Texas Airport (CTA) is a proposed airport within the proposed Eco-Merge Green Corporate Center complex in Bastrop County, Texas. It would be in proximity to the intersection of Farm to Market Road 969 and Farm to Market Road 1704, near 30°11′59″N 97°27′9″W.

The airport is intended to house up to 250 aircraft. It is intended as a site to house private and commercial aircraft and supporting services for both kinds.

The Central Texas Airport has faced opposition since it was first proposed and has yet to be approved for development. In November 2020, the CTA tried but failed to convince TCEQ to shut down a mulch and compost facility on 969. The employee-owned facility, called Organics-by-Gosh, does increase the number of birds in the potential flight paths for the potential airport site off FM 969.

== Neighboring airports ==
There are a small number of other public airports that also serve the Greater Austin area, however they all have extensive waitlists for hangar and T-hangar availability. As of 2021, the T-hangar waitlist at KGTU is currently more than 300 people long with more than a 7 year wait, KEDC has more than 30 people waiting for multiple years, and KHYI has more than 140 people on their waitlist also with an unspecified multi-year wait.

- Austin Bergstrom International Airport is located approximately 13 miles (21 km) from the proposed Central Texas Airport. Two fixed-base operators (FBOs) are located at Austin-Bergstrom International Airport, and provide general aviation terminals, hangars, maintenance, and fuel facilities. The instrumented 9,000-foot (2,700 m) runway adjacent to both FBOs offers excellent airside access. T-Hangars at ABIA enhance general aviation facilities and provide extra shelter for 54 general aviation aircraft. With the T-hangars and tie downs, the general aviation area now contains space for about 170 small aircraft. The airport opened in 1999 to replace Robert Mueller Municipal Airport.
- Austin Executive Airport, a 585-acre airport, offers private and corporate pilots an alternative to ABIA and is located just a half mile from Texas 130 tollway in Northeastern Travis County. This airport is approximately 16 miles (26 km) from the proposed Central Texas Airport that has faced considerable community opposition. The Austin Executive Airport has been open since mid-2011 with a new 6,000-foot (1,800 m) runway and taxiway, a 22,000-square-foot (2,000 m^{2}) terminal, hangars huge and small and an array of other general aviation facilities. Both the Executive Airport and the proposed CTA are within easy access to the Tollway 130 and are located next to a toll exit.
- San Marcos Airport
- Georgetown Municipal Airport
- Smithville-Crawford Municipal Airport
