= Smithville High School (Texas) =

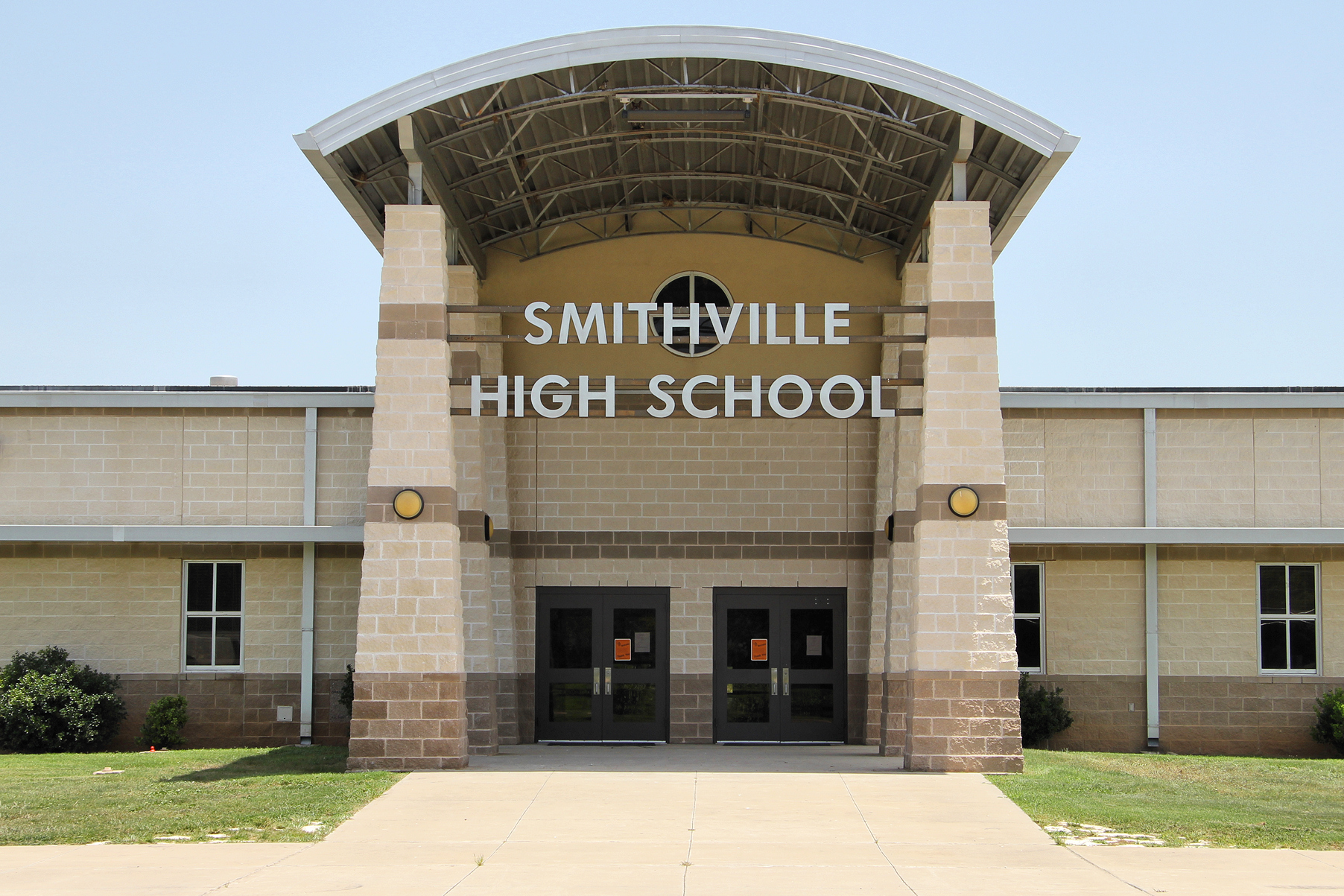

Location
- 285 Highway 95 South; Smithville, Bastrop County, Texas 78957-0479; United States; 29.99801°N 97.16589°W

Information
- School type: Public, high school
- Locale: Rural: Fringe
- School district: Smithville ISD
- NCES School ID: 484055004590
- Teaching staff: 45.10 (on an FTE basis)
- Grades: 9–12
- Enrollment: 531 (2025-2026)
- Student to teacher ratio: 12.42
- Colors: Orange, Black & White
- Athletics conference: UIL Class 3A
- Mascot: Tigers/Lady Tigers
- Website: Smithville High School

Smithville High School is a public high school located in Smithville, Texas (USA) and classified as a 3A school by the UIL as of 2026. It is part of the Smithville Independent School District located in southeast Bastrop County. During 2025-2026, Smithville High School had an enrollment of 531 students. The school received an overall rating of "B" from the Texas Education Agency for the 2024–2025 school year.

Its service area includes Smithville and Rosanky.

== Athletics ==
The Smithville Tigers compete in the following sports

- Baseball
- Basketball
- Cross Country
- Football
- Golf
- Powerlifting
- Softball
- Tennis
- Track and Field
- Volleyball

The Tiger Athletics iconic "T" was designed by Clayton Knight, a 2009 graduate of Smithville High School.

=== State titles ===
Smithville (UIL)

- Boys Track
  - 1919(B)

Smithville Brown (PVIL)

- Football
  - 1963(PVIL-1A)
