= Bateman, Texas =

- Unincorporated community
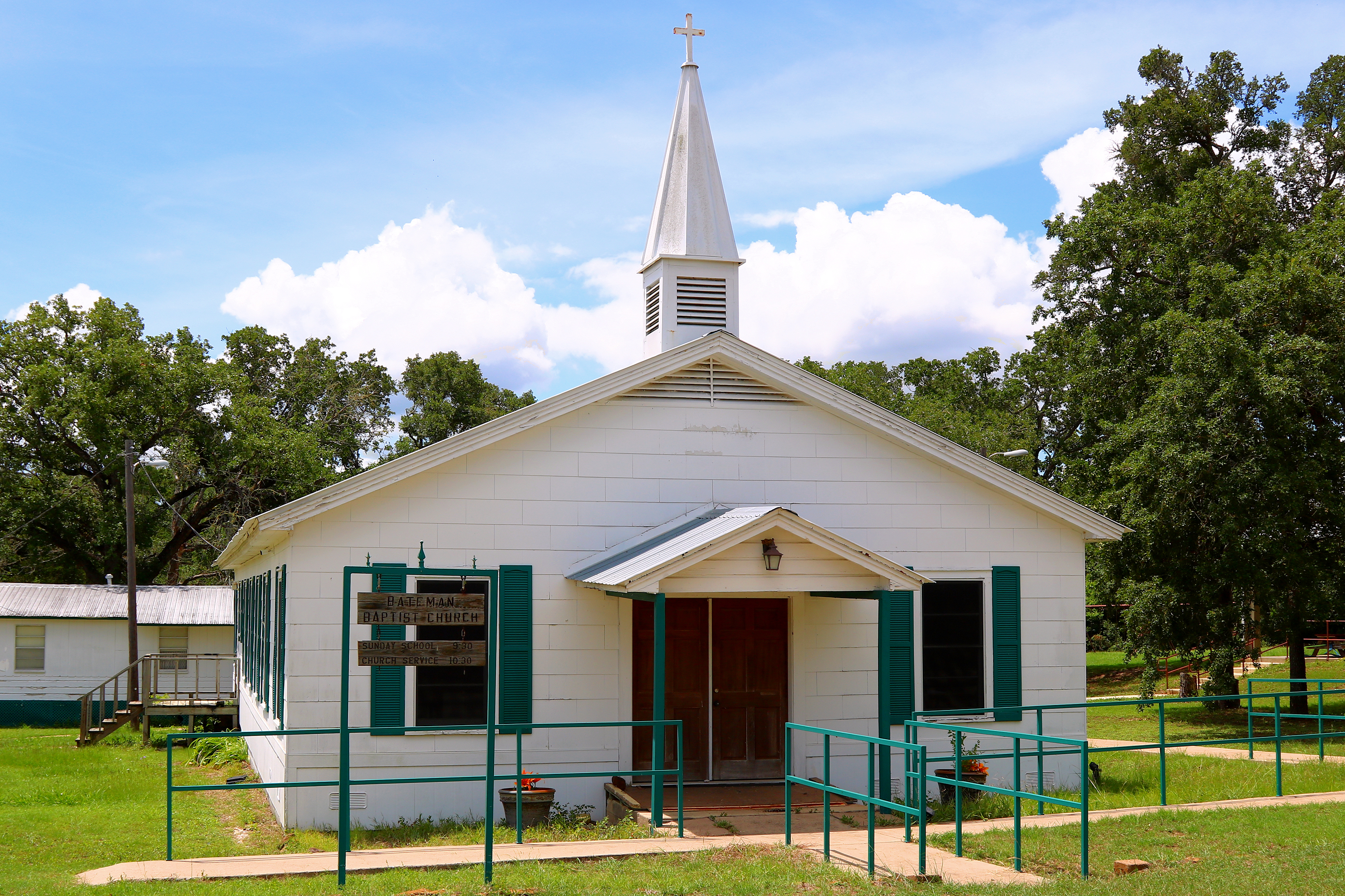
- Bateman Baptist Church

- Location within Texas Location within the United States
- Coordinates: 29°57′05″N 97°28′31″W
- Country: United States
- State: Texas
- County: Bastrop
- Elevation: 486 ft (148 m)
- Time zone: UTC-6 (Central (CST))
  - Summer (DST): UTC-5 (CDT)
- Area codes: 512 & 737
- GNIS feature ID: 1379396

Bateman is an unincorporated community in Bastrop County, Texas, United States. It is located within the Greater Austin metropolitan area.

== History ==
Bateman was founded in the 1880s and was named after an early settler. The Missouri-Kansas-Texas Railroad arrived in 1887 and with it expectations of growth and future prosperity. A post office was built in 1900, but closed in 1904, shifting area shipping to Round Rock. Bateman had only two businesses, and a population of 50, through the 1930s. By 2009, the population had dwindled to 12. Ranching and a modicum of oil extraction are the town's main economic activities.

== Geography ==
The town is located on Farm to Market Road 86, five miles southwest of Red Rock, 18 miles southwest of Bastrop and 45 miles southeast of Austin.

== Education ==
Bateman had a two-room school in the 1930s. Today, the community is served by the Bastrop Independent School District.
