= Elysium, Texas =

- Unincorporated community
- Location within Texas Location within the United States
- Coordinates: 30°10′01″N 97°30′55″W
- Country: United States
- State: Texas
- County: Bastrop
- Elevation: 443 ft (135 m)
- Time zone: UTC-6 (Central (CST))
  - Summer (DST): UTC-5 (CDT)
- Area codes: 512 & 737
- GNIS feature ID: 2034709

Elysium is an unincorporated community in Bastrop County, located in the U.S. state of Texas. It is located within the Greater Austin metropolitan area.

== History ==
A post office was established at Elysium in 1896 and remained in operation until 1901. It continued to be featured on county maps in 1981, but there were no buildings at the site.

== Geography ==
Elysium is located near Texas State Highway 71, 12 mi (19 km) west of Bastrop in western Bastrop County.

== Education ==
The community of Elysium is served by the Bastrop Independent School District.
