= Minette Teichmueller =

American artist, muralist (1871–1970)

- Born: January 27, 1871; La Grange, Texas
- Died: August 28, 1970 (aged 99); Nacogdoches, Texas
- Known for: muralist

Minette Teichmueller (1871 – 1970) was an American muralist known for her Smithville, Texas post office mural, The Law, Texas Rangers.

Teichmueller was born on January 27, 1871, in La Grange, Texas. She studied at the Chicago Academy of Fine Arts and the San Antonio Academy of Art. She was married to fellow artist Hugo Pohl (1878 - 1960).

In 1940 she completed the oil-on-canvas mural The Law, Texas Rangers for the Smithville post office. It was commissioned by the Works Progress Administration and the Treasury Section of Fine Arts (TSFA).

Teichmueller died on August 28, 1970, in Nacogdoches, Texas.
