= Austin Community College District =

Community college in Austin, Texas, U.S.

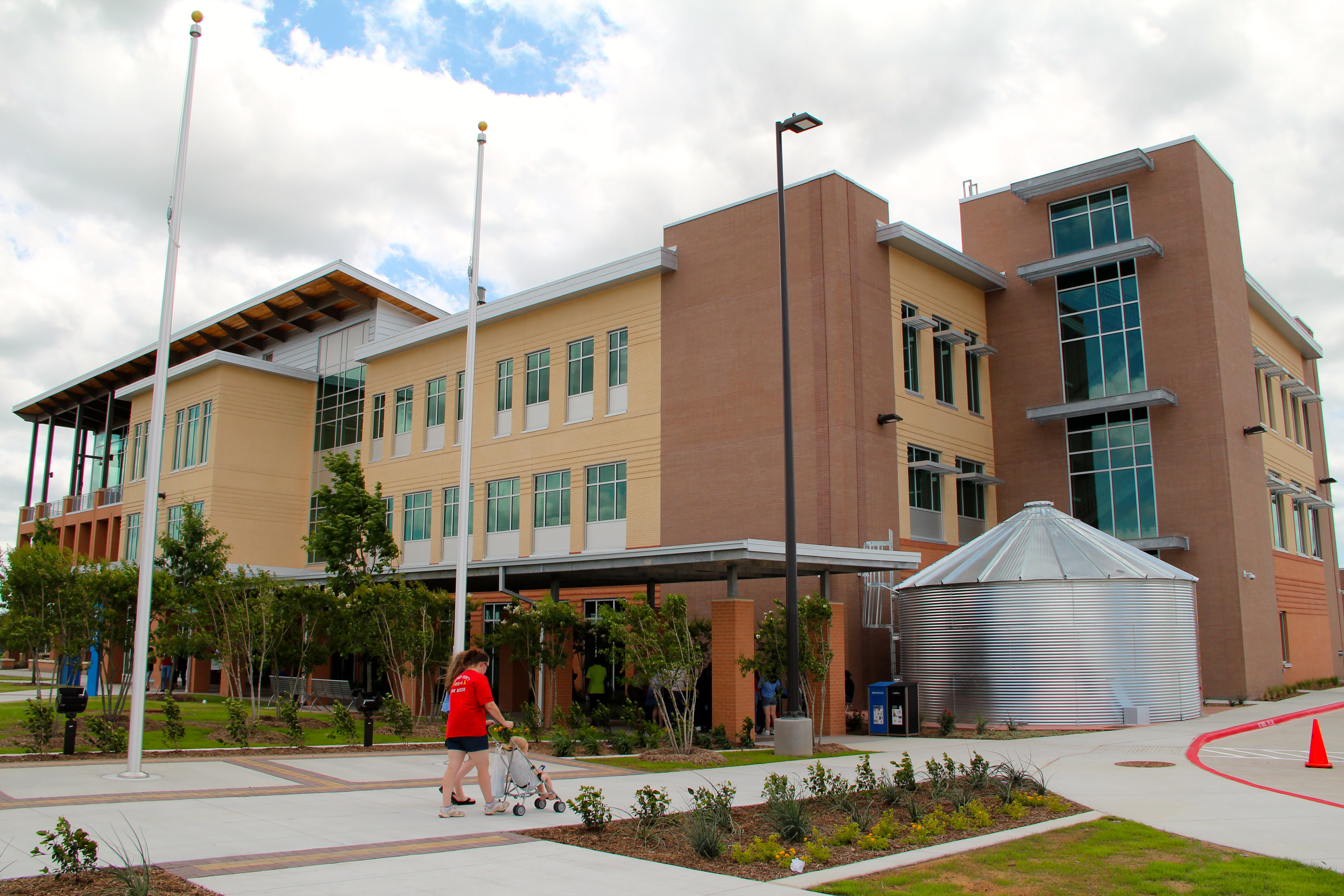
- The Austin Community College Elgin Campus building in Elgin, Texas in 2013
- Motto: Start Here. Get There.
- Type: Public community college district
- Established: September 17, 1973
- Chancellor: Russell Lowery-Hart
- Students: 35,011 students (Fall 2022)
- Location: Austin, Texas, United States
- Nickname: Riverbats
- Mascot: R.B. Bbhoggawact
- Website: www.austincc.edu

The Austin Community College District (ACC) is a public community college system serving the Austin, Texas, United States, metropolitan area and surrounding Central Texas communities. The college maintains numerous campuses, centers, and distance learning options to serve about 100,000 students in academic, continuing education and adult education programs.

ACC offers associate degrees and career/technical certificate programs in more than 100 areas of study as well as four bachelor degree programs. Most courses taken within the district are meant to apply for associate degrees, which help students qualify for jobs or can be transferred to four-year institutions. ACC is the sixth largest community college system in the United States, and the fourth largest college in Texas.

== History ==
In the 1960s, Austin residents and leaders discussed the possibility of establishing a community college for their growing city. The question was put to a vote repeatedly, but voters rejected the proposed taxpayer-supported college system in 1963, 1965 and 1968. In 1972, however, an alternative proposal that would allow the new college to be operated (and funded) by Austin Independent School District won a majority of voters' support. This plan meant that (at least initially) ACC would not levy any taxes on local residents to fund its operation, relying instead on state bodies such as the Texas College System Coordinating Board and the Texas Education Agency (as well as tuition and fees from students).

ACC received its accreditation from SACS in 1978. As the system's student population grew, it quickly came to need more funding than its operation as a branch of AISD could provide. In 1981, the school administration petitioned voters in Travis County to make ACC a county-wide public college with its own taxing authority and to permit it to issue bonds to fund facility expansions and renovations. The initiative was initially rejected at the polls, but a similar measure was enacted in 1986, separating ACC from AISD and establishing its governing board and taxing authority.

=== District and service area ===
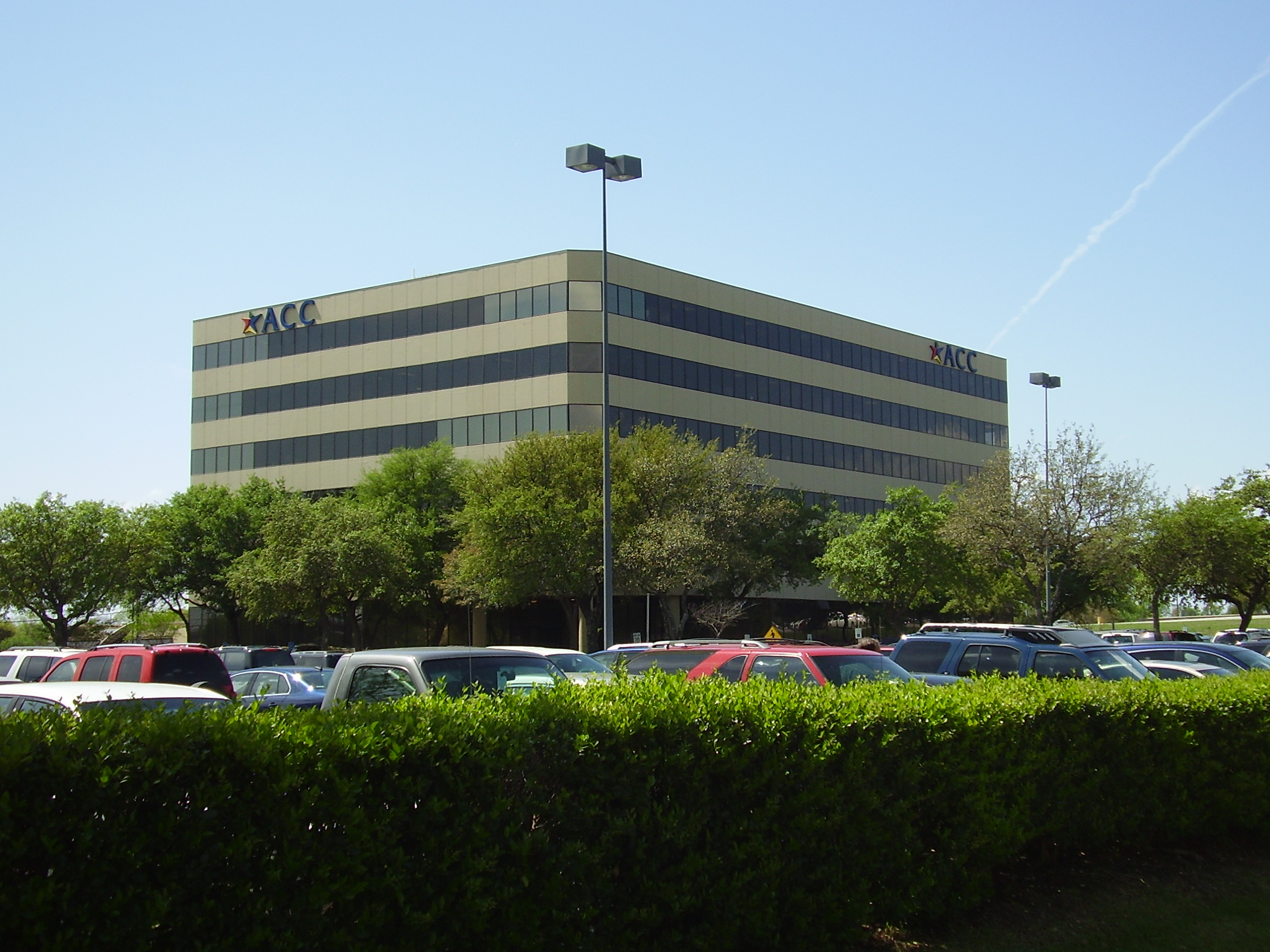
ACC headquarters

The system's service area has grown steadily across its history as surrounding regions have agreed to be annexed into the tax district in return for in-district tuition for their residents. The ACC District now spans all or most of seven counties in Central Texas and parts of four more. As defined by the Texas Legislature, the official service area of ACC currently includes:

- Hays, Caldwell, and Blanco counties;
- Travis County, excepting the territory within the Marble Falls Independent School District;
- Williamson County, excepting the territory within the Florence, Granger, Hutto, Lexington, Taylor, and Thrall independent school districts;
- Bastrop County, excepting the territory within the Lexington Independent School District;
- the part of the San Marcos Consolidated Independent School District located in Guadalupe County;
- the part of the Elgin Independent School District located in Lee County; and
- the part of the Smithville Independent School District located in Fayette County.

== Campuses ==
Campus locations

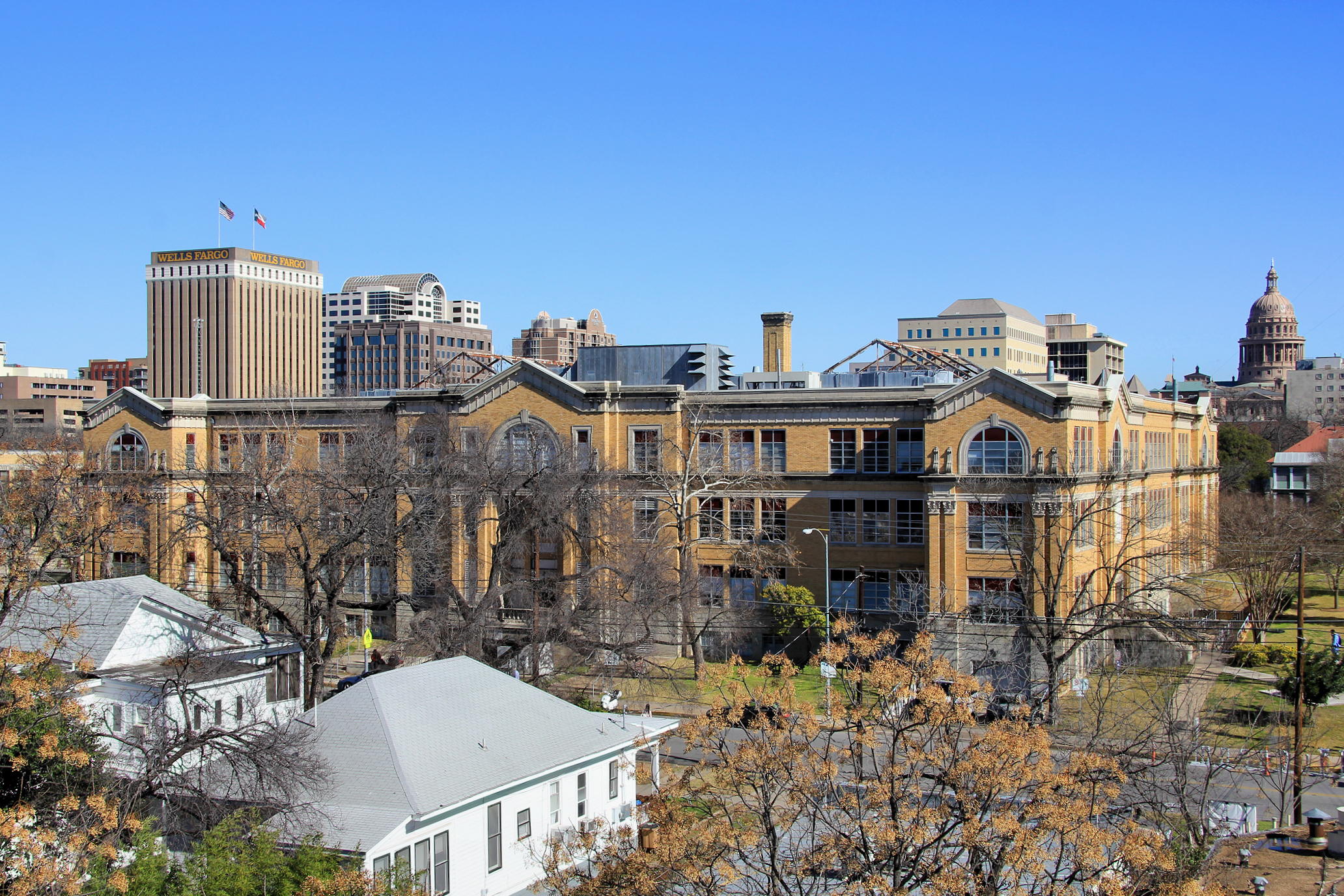
ACC Rio Grande Campus, ACC's oldest currently operating campus

In the fall of 1973, the college held its first classes in the former Anderson High School building in east Austin, which ACC named its Ridgeview Campus. Evening classes were also held at several Austin public high schools. The Rio Grande Campus, the system's second, was opened downtown in 1975 in the building recently vacated by Austin High School.

Over succeeding decades, the college added the Riverside Campus in the East Riverside neighborhood of southeast Austin, on the former site of the Austin Country Club (1984); the Northridge Campus on the northern edge of Travis County (1989); the Pinnacle Campus in Oak Hill in southwest Austin (1990); the Cypress Creek Campus in Cedar Park (1991); the Eastview Campus in east Austin (1999); the South Austin Campus (2006); the Round Rock Campus (2010); the Elgin Campus (2013); the Highland Campus, on the site of the closing Highland Mall in north Austin (2013); the Hays Campus in Kyle (2014); and the San Gabriel Campus in Leander (2018). The Ridgeview Campus closed in 1989, and Pinnacle closed in 2019. ACC's administrative offices are located in north-central Austin.

== Administration ==
ACC has a nine-member board of trustees whose members are elected by residents of the taxation district. Each member is elected at-large by the entire district and serves for a six-year term with no term limits. In addition to developing policies for the organization as a whole, the board is responsible for appointing the college chancellor, who then selects the rest of ACC's administrative staff and directs the day-to-day operation of the college as its chief executive officer.

List of ACC College Presidents
- Russell Lowery-Hart 2023-present
- Richard Rhodes: 2011–2023
- Stephen B. Kinslow: 2005-2011
- Stephen B. Kinslow (interim): 2005
- Robert Aguero: 2004-2005
- Stephen B. Kinslow: (interim) 2004
- Richard Fonté: 1997-2004
- Janis M. Koenig (interim): 1997
- Hosni Nabi (interim): 1996-1997
- William E. Segura: 1993-1996
- Roland K. Smith (interim): 1992-1993
- Daniel D. Angel: 1985-1992
- Roland K. Smith (interim): 1984
- Brent Knight (interim): 1983-1984
- Roland K. Smith (interim): 1983
- Cecil L. Groves: 1977-1983
- Marvin D. Shwiff (interim): 1977
- Thomas Hatfield: 1973-1977

== Academics ==
ACC offers associate degrees and certificates in more than 100 fields, as well as offering career and technical training programs, adult education/GED programs, and continuing education programs. The school also facilitates transfer of core curriculum credits to bachelor's degree programs at four-year institutions; tuition costs for two years of study at ACC are significantly lower than those at major Texas public universities, leading many students complete basic course work at ACC before transferring as a way of reducing college costs. The college system and its degrees are accredited by the Southern Association of Colleges and Schools. ACC also has an honors program which is intended to "develop the ability and potential of highly motivated students."

In fall 2018, the college began offering registered nurses with the option to earn a Bachelor of Science in Nursing (BSN) from its RN-to-BSN Program. As of fall 2023, the college has added three more bachelor's degrees in software development, manufacturing engineering technology and cybersecurity.

== Notable alumni ==
- Krista Allen, actress and model
- Brene Brown, author and therapist
- Alex Jones, radio host and conspiracy theorist
- Richard Linklater, film director
- Justin Tucker, professional football player

== Austin Community College television channel ==
ACCTV is an educational cable access channel.

Residents in the Austin Community College area get the Austin Community College channel on the following cable providers:

- Optimum channel 6
- Grande Communications channel 19
- Spectrum channel 19
- AT&T U-Verse channel 99
