= University of Texas-University Charter School =

Coordinates: 30°15′37″N 97°43′3″W

Information
- School type: Charter school
- Established: 1998; 27 years ago
- Grades: K-12
- Enrollment: c. 500
- Affiliation: University of Texas at Austin
- Website: utcharter.org

The University of Texas-University Charter School is a charter school operated by the University of Texas at Austin, serving about 500 students from kindergarten to 12th grade on twenty campuses across Texas.

== History ==
The school was opened in 1998.

== School structure ==
The school operates at twenty campuses, including:

- residential treatment centers,
- psychiatric hospitals,
- residential homes for children who, for a variety of reasons, cannot live at home,
- a medical facility for children who require specialized services due to brain injury or neuro-behavioral issues, and/or who are considered medically fragile, and
- an elite gymnastics program
