= Rosanky, Texas =

Census-designated place in Bastrop County, Texas, United States

Coordinates: 29°55′46″N 97°17′37″W

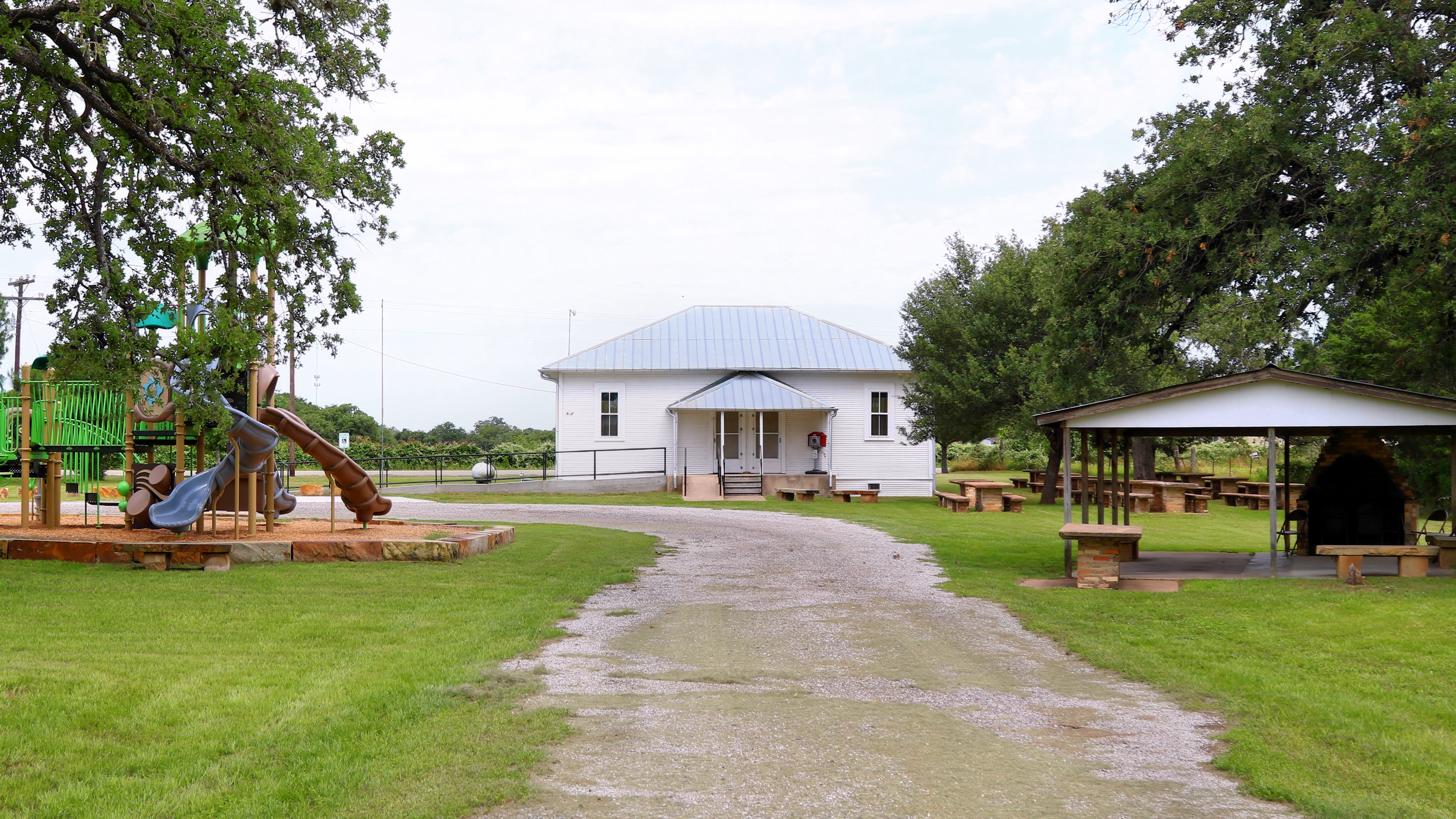
The community center in Rosanky.

Rosanky is a census designated place (CDP) located on Farm to Market Road 535 in southern Bastrop County, Texas, United States. As of the 2020 census, Rosanky had a population of 1,473. Rosanky has a post office, with the ZIP code 78953. The town is named for Ed Rosanky, who emigrated from Prussia and settled in the area in 1854.

== Climate ==
The climate in this area is characterized by hot, humid summers and generally mild to cool winters. According to the Köppen Climate Classification system, Rosanky has a humid subtropical climate, abbreviated "Cfa" on climate maps.

== Demographics ==
Historical population
Census	Pop.	Note	%±
2020	1,473		—
U.S. Decennial Census; 1850–1900 1910; 1920 1930 1940; 1950 1960 1970; 1980 1990 2000; 2010 2020

Rosanky first appeared as a census designated place in the 2020 U.S. census.

=== 2020 census ===
Rosanky CDP, Texas – Racial and ethnic composition Note: the US Census treats Hispanic/Latino as an ethnic category. This table excludes Latinos from the racial categories and assigns them to a separate category. Hispanics/Latinos may be of any race.
Race / Ethnicity (NH = Non-Hispanic)	Pop 2020	% 2020
White alone (NH)	1,078	73.18%
Black or African American alone (NH)	14	0.95%
Native American or Alaska Native alone (NH)	1	0.07%
Asian alone (NH)	5	0.34%
Pacific Islander alone (NH)	0	0.00%
Other race alone (NH)	14	0.95%
Mixed race or Multiracial (NH)	53	3.60%
Hispanic or Latino (any race)	308	20.91%
Total	1,473	100.00%

== Education ==
The community is in the Smithville Independent School District, which operates Smithville High School.

== Museum ==
- Central Texas Museum of Automotive History

== See also ==
- List of census-designated places in Texas
