= Camp Swift, Texas =

Military facility and census-designated place in Bastrop County, Texas, United States

- Census-designated place
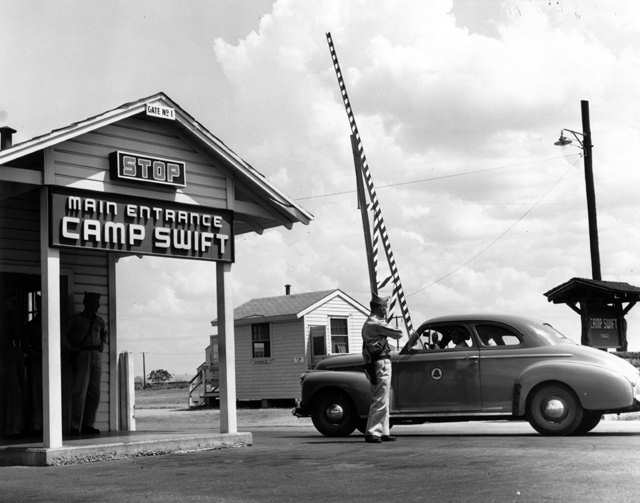
- Main entrance to the Camp Swift facility of the 10th Mountain Division during World War II

- Coordinates: 30°11′19″N 97°17′36″W
- Country: United States
- State: Texas
- County: Bastrop

Area
  - Total: 12.1 sq mi (31.4 km^{2})
  - Land: 12.0 sq mi (31.2 km^{2})
  - Water: 0.077 sq mi (0.2 km^{2})
- Elevation: 456 ft (139 m)

Population (2020)
  - Total: 7,943
  - Density: 659/sq mi (255/km^{2})
- Time zone: UTC-6 (Central (CST))
  - Summer (DST): UTC-5 (CDT)
- Zip Code: 78602
- FIPS code: 48-12334
- GNIS feature ID: 2407948

Camp Swift is a census-designated place (CDP) in Bastrop County, Texas, United States. Its population was 7,943 at the 2020 census. Camp Swift began as a United States Army training base built in 1942. It is named after Major General Eben Swift.

== History ==
The Army signed a $25 million contract in January 1942 to build a training camp on 56,000 acres north of Bastrop, Texas. The contract stipulated the project was to be completed in 108 working days. About 2700 buildings were built during World War II, but none of those remain on the site today. At the end of the war, they were sold or donated, and relocated. The gymnasium was relocated to Whitney, Texas. It is still in use today by the school district.

During World War II, German prisoners of war began arriving and at peak numbered 10,000. At the same time, the camp held 90,000 GIs, making it "one of the largest army training and trans-shipment camps in Texas" according to Krammer.

In December 1942, Sgt Walter Springs was gunned down by a military police officer following a dispute as Springs was reporting to Camp Swift. Springs was shot in the back, but the case remains largely unsolved to this day. A memorial scholarship in his honor has been active at his alma mater, Regis University, for most of the period since 1952 and has the backing of former NBA All Star Chauncey Billups.

The 10th Mountain Division trained at Camp Swift in 1944. The 2nd Infantry Division trained there mid-1945 to early 1946. The camp also trained nurses under battlefield conditions. The camp trained some 300,000 soldiers before the war ended.

After World War II, most of the land was returned to its former owners. The U.S. government retained 11,700 acres as a military reservation and a smaller parcel for FCI Bastrop.

The Texas Wing of the Civil Air Patrol, the auxiliary of the Air Force, has held its encampment, a one-week, high-intensity simulated military training program for cadet (leaders in training) members in Camp Swift since 2011.

== Current Operations ==
Camp Swift military reservation

The United States Army Corps of Engineers, currently owns Camp Swift, but it is managed by the Texas Military Forces headquartered on Camp Mabry in Austin. It serves as a training center for the National and State Guard, active armed forces, law enforcement, JROTC, and the Civil Air Patrol Texas Wing. The camp is the primary emergency staging area for Central Texas. and the primary site for pre-mobilization training for the Texas Army National Guard.

Beginning in 2007, Camp Swift became home to the 136th Combat Arms Training Regiment and Texas National Guard Training Center of Excellence. The 136th Regiment conducts military occupational specialty qualification courses, Noncommissioned Officer Education System courses, Officer Candidate School, Warrant Officer Candidate School, and other specialty courses.

Camp Swift has educational facilities and classrooms, a gas chamber, an airborne drop zone, rifle and pistol ranges, helicopter landing sites, and a land navigation course.

== Geography ==
Camp Swift is located north of the center of Bastrop County. It is about 37 miles (60 km) east of Austin and 7 miles (11 km) north of Bastrop. Texas State Highway 95 forms the western edge of the community, connecting Bastrop to the south with Elgin to the north.

According to the United States Census Bureau, the CDP has a total area of 12.1 square miles (31.4 km^{2}), of which 0.08 square miles (0.2 km^{2}), or 0.65%, is covered by water.

== Demographics ==
Historical population
Census	Pop.	Note	%±
1990	2,681		—
2000	4,731		76.5%
2010	6,383		34.9%
2020	7,943		24.4%
U.S. Decennial Census; 1850–1900 1910; 1920 1930 1940; 1950 1960 1970; 1980 1990 2000; 2010

Camp Swift first appeared as a census designated place in the 1990 U.S. census.

=== 2020 census ===
Camp Swift CDP, Texas – Racial and ethnic composition Note: the US Census treats Hispanic/Latino as an ethnic category. This table excludes Latinos from the racial categories and assigns them to a separate category. Hispanics/Latinos may be of any race.
Race / Ethnicity (NH = Non-Hispanic)	Pop 2000	Pop 2010	Pop 2020	% 2000	% 2010	% 2020
White alone (NH)	2,459	2,731	2,476	51.98%	42.79%	31.17%
Black or African American alone (NH)	398	657	457	8.41%	10.29%	5.75%
Native American or Alaska Native alone (NH)	25	47	30	0.53%	0.74%	0.38%
Asian alone (NH)	12	30	22	0.25%	0.47%	0.28%
Native Hawaiian or Pacific Islander alone (NH)	2	7	0	0.04%	0.11%	0.00%
Other race alone (NH)	1	11	37	0.02%	0.17%	0.47%
Multiracial (NH)	42	91	139	0.89%	1.43%	1.75%
Hispanic or Latino (any race)	1,792	2,809	4,782	37.88%	44.01%	60.20%
Total	4,731	6,383	7,943	100.00%	100.00%	100.00%

As of the 2020 United States census, 7,943 people, 1,444 households, and 1,025 families were residing in the CDP.

As of the 2000 census, 4,731 people, 1,127 households, and 849 families resided in the CDP. The population density was 396.2 inhabitants per square mile (153.0/km^{2}). The 1,231 housing units had an average density of 103.1 per square mile (39.8/km^{2}). The racial makeup of the CDP was 73.28% White, 8.84% African American, 1.16% Native American, 0.25% Asian, 0.06% Pacific Islander, 13.11% from other races, and 3.30% from two or more races. Hispanics or Latinos of any race were 37.88% of the population.

Of the 1,127 households, 40.1% had children under 18 living with them, 58.2% were married couples living together, 10.9% had a female householder with no husband present, and 24.6% were not families. About 19.3% of all households were made up of individuals, and 4.4% had someone living alone who was 65 or older. The average household size was 2.98 and the average family size was 3.40.

In the CDP, the age distribution was 22.6% under 18, 8.9% from 18 to 24, 42.5% from 25 to 44, 21.1% from 45 to 64, and 5.0% who were 65 or older. The median age was 34 years. For every 100 females, there were 185.9 males. For every 100 females 18 and over, there were 224.0 males.

The median income for a household in the CDP was $41,833 and for a family was $44,352. Males had a median income of $30,572 versus $25,044 for females. The per capita income for the CDP was $12,829. About 9.2% of families and 11.6% of the population were below the poverty line, including 9.6% of those under 18 and 25.7% of those 65 or over.

== Government and infrastructure ==
Federal Correctional Institution Bastrop, a prison of the Federal Bureau of Prisons (BOP), is in Camp Swift.

== Education ==
Camp Swift is served by the Bastrop Independent School District. Most residents are zoned to Lost Pines Elementary School, while a small southern section is zoned to Mina Elementary School. All residents are zoned to Bastrop Intermediate School, Bastrop Middle School, and Bastrop High School.

== See also ==
- Kerr Community Center
- Texas Military Forces
- Texas Military Department
- List of conflicts involving the Texas Military
- Awards and decorations of the Texas Military
- List of World War II prisoner-of-war camps in the United States
- List of census-designated places in Texas
