= Paige, Texas =

- City
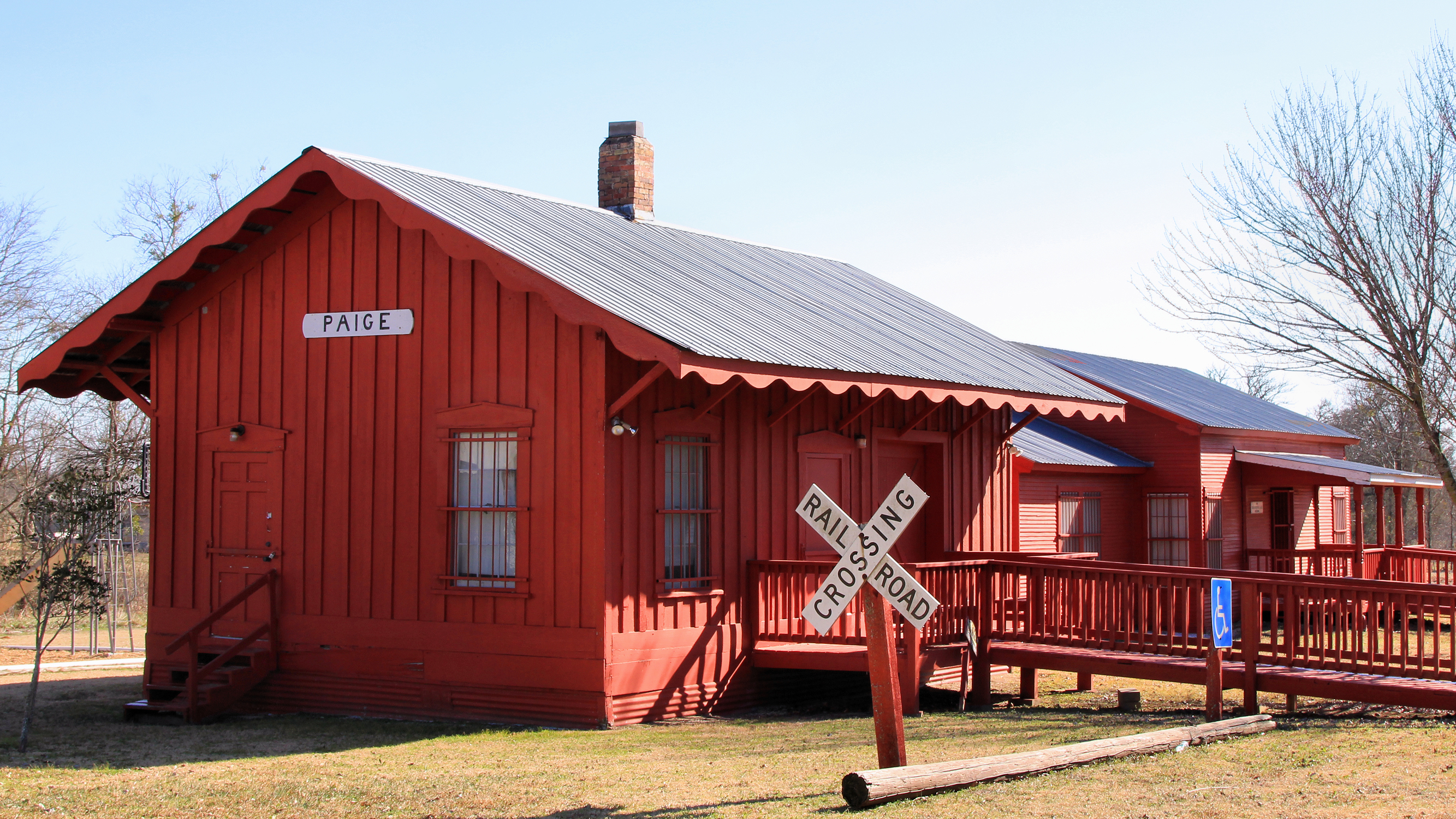
- The former train station in Paige
- Interactive map of Paige, Texas
- Coordinates: 30°12′55″N 97°07′26″W
- Country: United States
- State: Texas
- County: Bastrop
- Established: 1872

Area
  - Total: 2.16 sq mi (5.59 km^{2})
  - Land: 2.15 sq mi (5.57 km^{2})
  - Water: 0.0077 sq mi (0.02 km^{2})
- Elevation: 554 ft (169 m)

Population (2000)
  - Total: 275
  - Density: 25/sq mi (9.7/km^{2})
- Time zone: UTC-6 (Central (CST))
  - Summer (DST): UTC-5 (CDT)
- ZIP code: 78659
- Area codes: 512, 737
- GNIS feature ID: 2805732

Paige is an unincorporated community in Bastrop County, Texas, United States.

== Namesake ==
Paige, Texas was named after Norman Paige, a civil engineer who planned the route of Houston and Texas Central Railway.

== History ==
Paige was created in 1872 near the Houston and Texas Central Railway. The post office of Paige was created in 1874, and in 1876, the railway station near the town was moved three miles east to the location of the current station. In 1877, Fedor Soder arrived in the town and sold many town lots to Germans. He also created a store and a cotton gin, as the town was growing due to massive production of cotton in the area. The population of Paige in 1884 was about 350 citizens, and it jumped to 500 in 1886. By that time, the town had several businesses, a broom factory, a creamery, a pickle factory, and seven cotton gins. The town was a large shipping joint for butter, cattle, cordwood, cotton, eggs, hogs, potatoes, and many other items. The town gained a bank and telephone service in 1914, but the population slightly decreased up till the 1960s or 1970s.

== Geography ==
Paige is located 44 miles east of Austin. The town is on U.S. Highway 290.

== Demographics ==
Historical population
Census	Pop.	Note	%±
2020	278		—
U.S. Decennial Census; 1850–1900 1910; 1920 1930 1940; 1950 1960 1970; 1980 1990 2000; 2010 2020

Paige first appeared as a census designated place in the 2020 U.S. census.

=== 2020 census ===
Paige CDP, Texas – Racial and ethnic composition Note: the US Census treats Hispanic/Latino as an ethnic category. This table excludes Latinos from the racial categories and assigns them to a separate category. Hispanics/Latinos may be of any race.
Race / Ethnicity (NH = Non-Hispanic)	Pop 2020	% 2020
White alone (NH)	146	52.52%
Black or African American alone (NH)	7	2.52%
Native American or Alaska Native alone (NH)	3	1.08%
Asian alone (NH)	0	0.00%
Pacific Islander alone (NH)	1	0.36%
Other race alone (NH)	1	0.36%
Mixed race or Multiracial (NH)	10	3.60%
Hispanic or Latino (any race)	110	39.57%
Total	278	100.00%

== Education ==
The Paige community is within the Bastrop Independent School District. Students attend Emile Elementary School (in the former Emile School), Bastrop Intermediate School, Bastrop Middle School, and Bastrop High School.
