= Bastrop County, Texas =

County in Texas, United States

- County
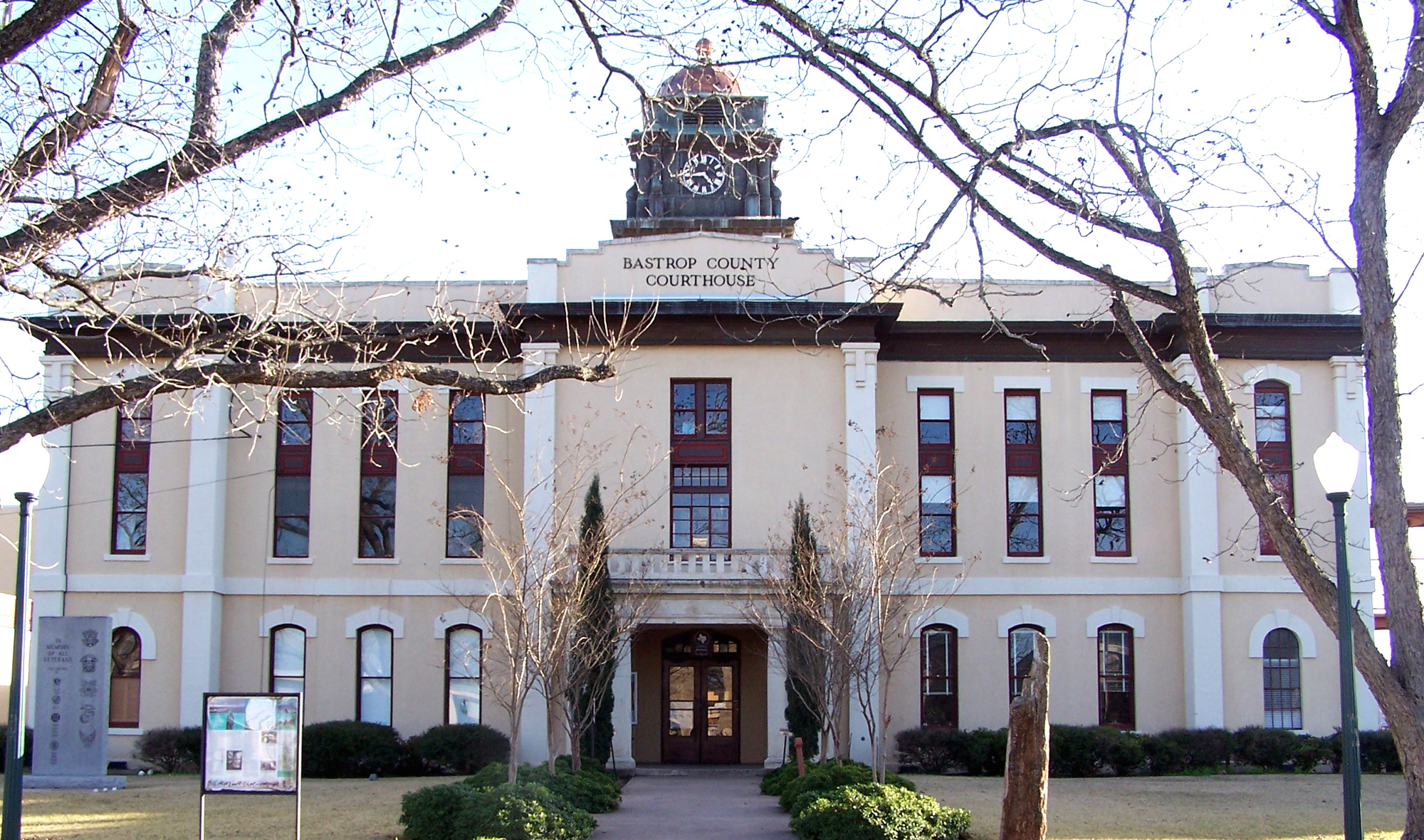
- The Bastrop County Courthouse in Bastrop is designed in classical revival style. Built in 1883, the Courthouse and Jail Complex were listed in the National Register of Historic Places on November 20, 1975.

- Location within the U.S. state of Texas
- Coordinates: 30°06′N 97°19′W
- Country: United States
- State: Texas
- Founded: 1837
- Named for: Felipe Enrique Neri, Baron de Bastrop
- Seat: Bastrop
- Largest city: Elgin

Area
  - Total: 896 sq mi (2,320 km^{2})
  - Land: 888 sq mi (2,300 km^{2})
  - Water: 7.4 sq mi (19 km^{2}) 0.8%

Population (2020)
  - Total: 97,217
  - Estimate (2025): 118,908 ▲
  - Density: 109/sq mi (42.3/km^{2})
- Time zone: UTC−6 (Central)
  - Summer (DST): UTC−5 (CDT)
- Congressional districts: 10th, 27th
- Website: www.bastropcounty.gov

Bastrop County is in Central Texas in the U.S. state of Texas. Its county seat is Bastrop. As of the 2020 census, the population was 97,216. Bastrop County is included in the Austin–Round Rock, Texas, metropolitan statistical area.

== History ==
In 1834, the provincial legislature of Coahuila y Tejas – established by the Mexican Constitution of 1824 – met in Saltillo and established the Municipality and County of Mina, consisting of parts of present-day Mason, Kimble, Llano, Burnet, Williamson, Gillespie, Blanco, Comal, Hays, Travis, Caldwell, Bastrop, Lee, Gonzales, Fayette, Washington, and Lavaca Counties.

On December 14, 1837, the second Congress of the Republic of Texas adjusted geographical limits to create Fayette County, and remove Gonzales and Caldwell Counties from Mina's boundaries. On December 18, 1837, Sam Houston signed acts that (a) incorporated the town of Mina and (b) changed the name of the county and town of Mina to Bastrop to honor Felipe Enrique Neri, Baron de Bastrop, an early Dutch settler who helped Stephen F. Austin obtain land grants in Texas.

On May 24, 1838, the Republic of Texas added parts of Kimble and Comal Counties to contain parts of present-day Blanco, Burnet, Williamson, Travis, Hays, Comal, Caldwell, Bastrop, Lee, Gonzales, and Fayette Counties.

From January 25, 1840, to January 25, 1850, Bastrop county limits shifted nearly to its present dimensions, including small portions of Lee, Williamson, Caldwell, Gonzales, and Fayette Counties.

In December 1942, Bastrop was the site of an alleged military murder, in which Sgt. Walter Springs was gunned down by a White military police officer following a dispute. Springs was shot in the back, but the case remains largely unsolved to this day. A memorial scholarship in his honor has been active at his alma mater, Regis University, for most of the period since 1952 and has the backing of former NBA All Star Chauncey Billups.

In September 2011, Bastrop County suffered the most destructive wildfire in Texas history, which destroyed over 1,600 homes.

In March 2022, the Refuge Ranch, a facility in rural Bastrop County for girls who had been victims of sexual trafficking, was ordered closed down after allegations that the girls had been subjected to further exploitation by ranch staffers.

== Climate ==
In general this area has a subtropical and humid maritime climate with consistently hot and dry summers, while the milder winter weather occasionally has short spans of cold temperatures. The growing season starts in early March and continues through late November, while annually this location receives 37.2 inches of average precipitation, and also on average experiences 49 days per year of at least 0.1 inches, primarily during May, June, September, and October.

Within the Texas Gulf Coast basin where Bastrop County resides, severe to extreme droughts occur at least once every 10 years (within a century of record keeping). Additionally, flash flooding due to hurricanes or slow thunderstorms are of concern, with 10-11 inches of rain within a single day being at least 1% likely.

== Geography ==
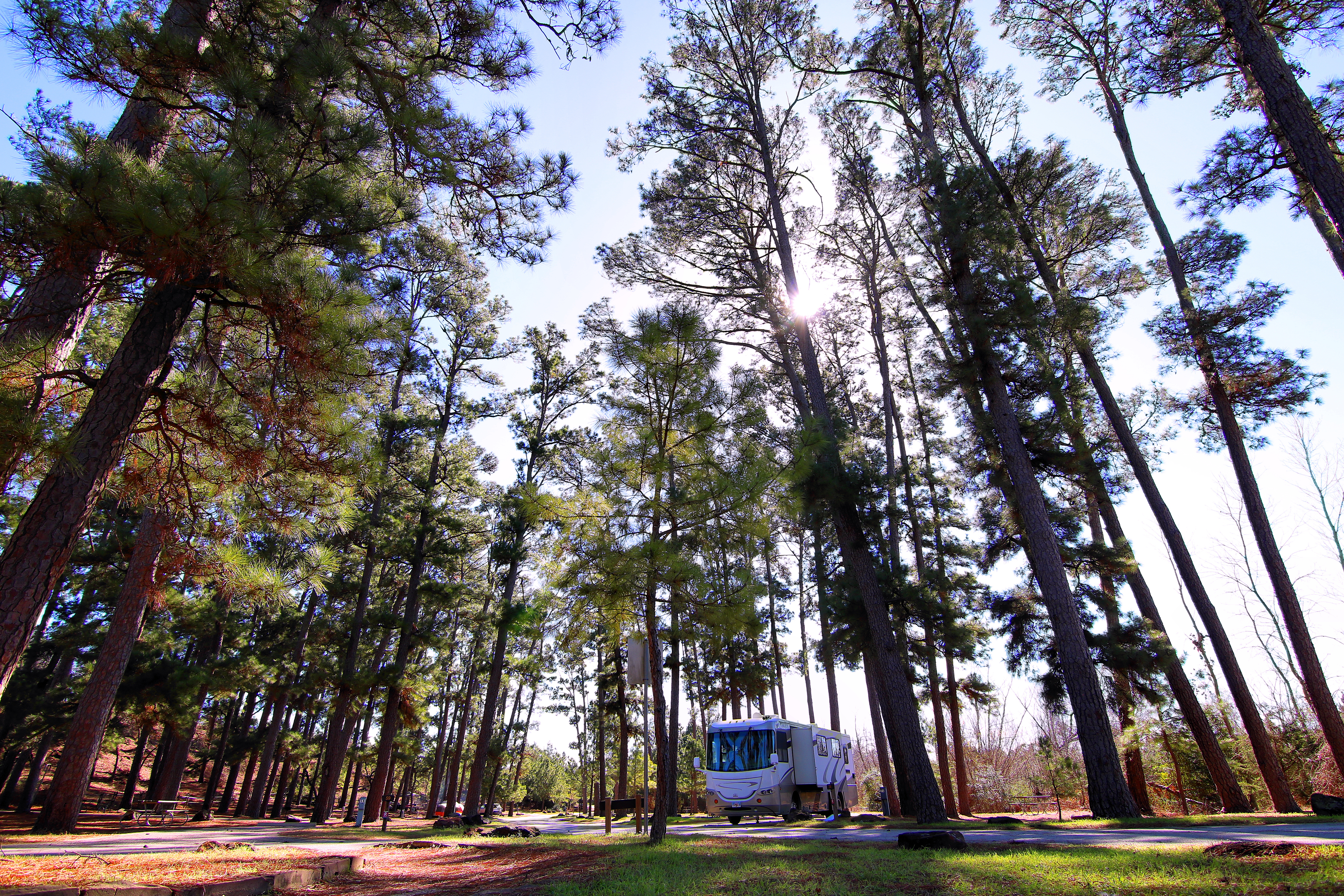
The Lost Pines Forest in Bastrop State Park.

According to the U.S. Census Bureau, the county has a total area of 896 square miles (2,320 km^{2}), of which 888 square miles (2,300 km^{2}) are land and 7.4 square miles (19 km^{2}) (0.8%) are covered by water. This area resides in the Gulf Coastal Plains which has sparse topographic relief; elevations gently slope between 400-600 feet. Vegetation is primarily Post Oak savannah and woodland, Blackland Prairie, and pine hardwood forest. The unique Lost Pines Forest features loblolly pine (Pinus taeda) which require the deep, moist, acidic, sandy soil of the Carrizo Sands formation.

As for geologic formations, the most recent around floodplains and lowlands of the Colorado River (as well as larger nearby streams) are alluvium, fluviatile terrace deposits, and high gravel. Tertiary formations have sandstone, mudstone, sand, and clay running in bands from northeast to southwest, which notably also provide the critically endangered Houston Toad necessary deep sandy soil habitat. Major aquifers include the Carrizo-Wilcox, Colorado River, and Lake Bastrop, and the water system divides along US Highway 290 to separate the Colorado River and the Brazos River basins.

== Wildlife ==
The most notable animal within Bastrop County is the critically endangered amphibian Houston Toad.

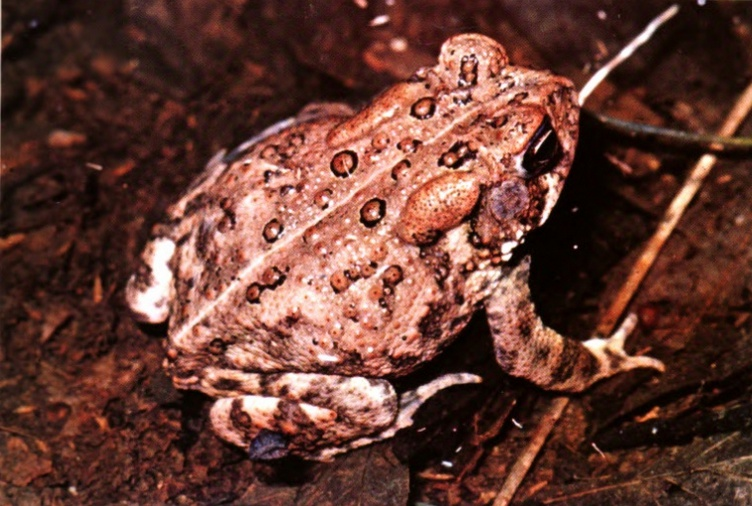
The Houston Toad

Otherwise the area features primarily Post Oak Savannah and pine oak woodland wildlife, with more than 200 documented species of birds as of 1996. Bastrop County is the southwestern-most area for the pileated woodpecker (Dryocopus pileatus), pine warbler (Dendroica pinus), and includes the western range for the Kentucky warbler (Oporornis formosus), hooded warbler (Wilsonia citrina), and Swainson's warbler (Limnothlypis swainsonii).

Rare species in Bastrop County tracked by the Texas Parks and Wildlife are the Henslow's sparrow (Ammodramus henslowii), mountain plover (Anarhynchus montanus), cave myotis, Elliot's short-tailed shrew (Blarina hylophaga hylophaga), plains spotted skunk, spot-tailed earless lizard, and Texas gartersnake (T. sirtalis annectens).

Common mammals found in this county are white-tailed deer, common raccoon, striped skunk, black-tailed jackrabbit, coyote, red fox and common gray fox, bobcat, ringtail cat (Bassariscus astutus), Virginia opossum (Didelphis virginiana), fox squirrel, eastern cottontail, Mexican long-nosed armadillo. Additionally some smaller mammals found here are the eastern red bat (Lasiurus borealis), eastern mole (Scalopus aquaticus), short tailed shrew (Blarina sp.), Attwater's pocket gopher (Geomy attwateri), white-footed mouse (Peromyscus leucopus), northern pygmy mouse (Baiomys taylori), hispid cotton rat (Sigmodon hispidus), Brazilian free-tailed bat (Tadarida brasiliensis), cave myotis (Myotis velifer), Southern flying squirrel (Glaucomys volans), and the eastern spotted skunk (Spilogale putorius).

Other amphibians are the small-mouth salamander (Ambystoma texanum), cricket frog (Acris crepitans), green toad (B. debilis), Texas toad (B. speciosus), Gulf Coast toad (B. valliceps valliceps), Woodhouse's toad (B. woodhousii), eastern narrowmouth toad (Gastrophryne carolinensis), Great Plains Narrowmouth Toad (G. olivacea). Some frogs include the Rio Grande leopard (Rana berlandieri), bullfrog (R, catesbeiana), green (R. clamitans), southern leopard (R. sphenocephala), and both Couch's and Hurter's spadefoots (Scaphiopus couchi and hurteri). Documented treefrogs include Cope's gray (Hyla chrysoscelis), green (Hyla cinerea), and gray (H. versicolor). Chorus Frog members found in Bastrop County are the spotted (Pseudacris clarki), Strecker's (P. streckeri), and striped (P. triseriata).

The largest reptile in Bastrop County is the American alligator, while some turtles include spiny softshell, common snapping turtle, Texas map (Graptemys versa), yellow mud (Kinosternon flavescens flavescens), river cooter (P. texana), eastern box turtle, ornate box turtle, and red-eared slider. Lizards found in this county are the green anole, Texas spotted whiptail, six-lined racerunner (C. sexlineatus), eastern collared lizard, spot-tailed earless lizard, Texas horned lizard, Texas spiny lizard, fence lizard, ground skink, and tree lizard.

Many snakes are present, including broad-banded copperhead, western cottonmouth, eastern glossy snake, eastern racer, western diamondback rattlesnake, corn snake, Texas rat snake, eastern hognose snake, prairie kingsnake, common kingsnake, western coachwhip (Masticophus flagellum testaceus), Texas coral snake, rough greensnake (Opheodrys aestivus), bullsnake, Texas long-nosed snake (Rhinocheilus lecontei), mountain patch-nosed snake (Salvadora grahamiae), Texas brownsnake (Storeria dekayi), flat-headed snake (Tantilla gracilis), Checkered garter snake, orange-striped ribbonsnake (T. proximus proximus), rough gartersnake (Virginia striatula), and timber rattlesnake. Watersnakes found here are the plain-bellied, southern, and diamondback (Nerodia erythrogaster, fasciata, rhombifera).

Major predatory fish in Bastrop County are the gar, black bass, and flathead catfish, forage species are various shiners, minnows, gizzard shad, sunfish, and anglers additionally pursue largemouth bass, Guadalupe bass, channel catfish, and white crappie.

=== Adjacent counties ===
- Williamson County (north and northwest)
- Lee County (northeast)
- Fayette County (southeast)
- Caldwell County (southwest)
- Travis County (west)

== Demographics ==
Historical population
Census	Pop.	Note	%±
1850	3,099		—
1860	7,006		126.1%
1870	12,209		74.3%
1880	17,215		41.0%
1890	20,736		20.5%
1900	26,845		29.5%
1910	25,344		−5.6%
1920	26,649		5.1%
1930	23,888		−10.4%
1940	21,610		−9.5%
1950	19,622		−9.2%
1960	16,925		−13.7%
1970	17,297		2.2%
1980	24,726		42.9%
1990	38,263		54.7%
2000	57,733		50.9%
2010	74,171		28.5%
2020	97,216		31.1%
2025 (est.)	118,908	▲	22.3%
U.S. Decennial Census; 1850–1900 1910; 1920 1930 1940; 1950 1960 1970; 1980 1990 2000; 2010 2020

=== Racial and ethnic composition ===
Bastrop County, Texas – Racial and ethnic composition Note: the US Census treats Hispanic/Latino as an ethnic category. This table excludes Latinos from the racial categories and assigns them to a separate category. Hispanics/Latinos may be of any race.
Race / Ethnicity (NH = Non-Hispanic)	Pop 1980	Pop 1990	Pop 2000	Pop 2010	Pop 2020	% 1980	% 1990	% 2000	% 2010	% 2020
White alone (NH)	17,037	26,665	37,764	42,446	45,751	68.90%	69.69%	65.41%	57.23%	47.06%
Black or African American alone (NH)	4,183	4,351	4,938	5,535	5,460	16.92%	11.37%	8.55%	7.46%	5.62%
Native American or Alaska Native alone (NH)	63	142	239	315	312	0.25%	0.37%	0.41%	0.42%	0.32%
Asian alone (NH)	28	122	255	449	718	0.11%	0.32%	0.44%	0.61%	0.74%
Native Hawaiian or Pacific Islander alone (NH)	x	x	22	54	63	x	x	0.04%	0.07%	0.06%
Other race alone (NH)	13	50	39	115	417	0.05%	0.13%	0.07%	0.16%	0.43%
Mixed race or Multiracial (NH)	x	x	631	1,067	3,011	x	x	1.09%	1.44%	3.10%
Hispanic or Latino (any race)	3,402	6,933	13,845	24,190	41,484	13.76%	18.12%	23.98%	32.61%	42.67%
Total	24,726	38,263	57,733	74,171	97,216	100.00%	100.00%	100.00%	100.00%	100.00%

=== 2020 census ===
As of the 2020 census, the county had a population of 97,216. The median age was 38.5 years. 24.9% of residents were under the age of 18 and 15.6% of residents were 65 years of age or older. For every 100 females there were 103.1 males, and for every 100 females age 18 and over there were 103.2 males age 18 and over.

The racial makeup of the county was 57.3% White, 5.9% Black or African American, 1.3% American Indian and Alaska Native, 0.8% Asian, 0.1% Native Hawaiian and Pacific Islander, 17.4% from some other race, and 17.1% from two or more races. Hispanic or Latino residents of any race comprised 42.7% of the population.

28.0% of residents lived in urban areas, while 72.0% lived in rural areas.

There were 33,267 households in the county, of which 35.1% had children under the age of 18 living in them. Of all households, 52.5% were married-couple households, 18.3% were households with a male householder and no spouse or partner present, and 23.1% were households with a female householder and no spouse or partner present. About 22.6% of all households were made up of individuals and 9.9% had someone living alone who was 65 years of age or older.

There were 36,683 housing units, of which 9.3% were vacant. Among occupied housing units, 76.0% were owner-occupied and 24.0% were renter-occupied. The homeowner vacancy rate was 1.4% and the rental vacancy rate was 8.2%.

=== 2010 census ===
As of the 2010 census, about 7.8 same-sex couples per 1,000 households lived in the county.

=== 2000 census ===
As of the census of 2000, 57,733 people, 20,097 households, and 14,771 families resided in the county. The population density was 65 people per square mile (25 people/km^{2}). The 22,254 housing units averagedf 25 per square mile (9.7/km^{2}). The racial makeup of the county was 80.2% White, 8.8% African American, 0.7% Native American, 0.5% Asian, 7.7% from other races, and 2.2% from two or more races. About 24.0% of the population were Hispanic or Latino of any race.

Of the 20,097 households, 35.90% had children under the age of 18 living with them, 58.5% were married couples living together, 10.5% had a female householder with no husband present, and 26.5% were not families. About 21.5% of all households were made up of individuals, and 7.5% had someone living alone who was 65 years of age or older. The average household size was 2.77 and the average family size was 3.23.

In the county, the population was distributed as 28.0% under the age of 18, 7.6% from 18 to 24, 31.3% from 25 to 44, 22.9% from 45 to 64, and 10.3% who were 65 years of age or older. The median age was 35 years. For every 100 females there were 105.5 males. For every 100 females age 18 and over, there were 104.8 males.

The median income for a household in the county was $43,578, and for a family was $49,456. Males had a median income of $32,843 versus $25,536 for females. The per capita income for the county was $18,146. About 8.4% of families and 11.6% of the population were below the poverty line, including 15.4% of those under age 18 and 13.3% of those age 65 or over.

== Education ==
The following school districts serve Bastrop County:

- Bastrop Independent School District
- Elgin Independent School District (partial)
- Lexington Independent School District (partial)
- McDade Independent School District
- Smithville Independent School District (partial)

Austin Community College is the designated community college for most of the county. Areas in Lexington ISD are in Blinn Junior College District.

== Transportation ==
Central Texas Airport has been proposed about ten miles 10 miles (16 km) NW of the town of Bastrop, but has met with local opposition.

=== Major highways ===
- U.S. Highway 290
- State Highway 21
- State Highway 71
- State Highway 95
- State Highway 304
- Loop 109
- Loop 150
- Loop 223
- Loop 230
- Spur 186

== Recreational facilities ==
- Bastrop State Park
- Buescher State Park

== Communities ==
=== Cities ===
- Bastrop (county seat)
- Elgin (partly in Travis County)
- Mustang Ridge (mostly in Travis County and a small part in Caldwell County)
- Smithville

=== Census-designated places ===
- Camp Swift
- Cedar Creek
- Circle D-KC Estates
- McDade
- Paige
- Red Rock
- Rosanky
- Wyldwood

=== Unincorporated communities ===
- Alum Creek
- Bateman
- Butler
- Colorado
- Elysium
- Hills Prairie
- Jeddo
- Kovar
- Pettytown (partly in Caldwell County)
- Rockne
- Salem
- Sayersville
- String Prairie
- Swiftex
- Upton
- Utley
- Watterson

=== Ghost towns ===
- Flower Hill
- Grassyville
- McDuff
- Oak Hill
- Phelan
- Pin Oak

== In popular culture ==
Several Hollywood feature films and notable independent films have used locations in Bastrop County.

Year	Film	Top-billed cast	Location
1974	Lovin' Molly	Anthony Perkins, Blythe Danner	Bastrop
1974	The Texas Chain Saw Massacre	Marilyn Burns, Allen Danziger	Bastrop (gas station and BBQ shack)
1975	The Great Waldo Pepper	Robert Redford, Bo Svenson	Elgin
1994	Love and a .45	Gil Bellows, Renée Zellweger	Bastrop (gas station)
1995	The Big Green	Steve Guttenberg, Olivia d'Abo	Elgin
1996	Courage Under Fire	Denzel Washington, Meg Ryan	Bastrop
1996	The Whole Wide World	Vincent D'Onofrio, Renée Zellweger	Bastrop
1997	The Only Thrill	Diane Keaton, Sam Shepard	Bastrop
1998	The Dentist 2	Corbin Bernsen, Jillian McWhirter	Smithville
1998	Home Fries	Drew Barrymore, Luke Wilson	Bastrop
1998	Hope Floats	Sandra Bullock, Harry Connick Jr.	Smithville
1999	Varsity Blues	James Van Der Beek, Amy Smart	Elgin
1999	The Soul Collector	Bruce Greenwood, Melissa Gilbert	Bastrop
2004	Friday Night Lights	Billy Bob Thornton, Lucas Black	Elgin
2004	The Alamo	Dennis Quaid, Billy Bob Thornton	Bastrop; Jim Small's Big Thicket (lake camp scenes); Steiner Ranch (Bexar & Alamo scenes)
2006	All the Boys Love Mandy Lane	Amber Heard, Anson Mount	Bastrop
2008	Fireflies in the Garden	Julia Roberts, Ryan Reynolds	Bastrop (T. A. Hasler House); Smithville
2009	The Tree of Life	Brad Pitt, Sean Penn	Smithville
2009	Friday the 13th (2009 film)	Jared Padalecki, Derek Mears	Camp
2010	Bernie	Matthew McConaughey, Jack Black	Bastrop; Smithville
2013	Prince Avalanche	Paul Rudd, Emile Hirsch	Bastrop
2014	Boyhood	Patricia Arquette, Ethan Hawke	Bastrop

== Politics ==
Bastrop County was strongly Democratic, just as most of the Southeast was, during the first half of the 20th century. The Democratic candidate won the county in every presidential election up until 1972, which was incumbent Republican Richard Nixon's landslide victory. Ronald Reagan was the only other Republican presidential candidate to carry Bastrop County in the 20th century, successfully doing so in 1984. However, Bill Clinton was the last Democrat to carry it in a presidential election; he did so in both of his runs. Bastrop County has become somewhat Republican-leaning in the 21st century, but presidential, senatorial, and gubernatorial margins have all been at 20% or below. The county flipped to Democratic U.S. Senate candidate James Talarico in 2026, though, and he won the county by an 11% margin over Ken Paxton, the Republican.

United States presidential election results for Bastrop County, Texas
Year	Republican		Democratic		Third party(ies)	
Year	No.	%	No.	%	No.	%
1912	216	15.30%	1,021	72.31%	175	12.39%
1916	550	28.81%	1,335	69.93%	24	1.26%
1920	484	22.35%	1,088	50.23%	594	27.42%
1924	494	14.31%	2,711	78.53%	247	7.16%
1928	850	35.65%	1,534	64.35%	0	0.00%
1932	180	5.52%	3,077	94.42%	2	0.06%
1936	198	7.61%	2,395	92.04%	9	0.35%
1940	502	16.76%	2,492	83.18%	2	0.07%
1944	385	11.71%	2,604	79.17%	300	9.12%
1948	443	13.69%	2,518	77.79%	276	8.53%
1952	1,540	32.81%	3,148	67.06%	6	0.13%
1956	1,531	37.85%	2,504	61.90%	10	0.25%
1960	1,208	29.61%	2,866	70.25%	6	0.15%
1964	1,130	22.38%	3,912	77.48%	7	0.14%
1968	1,455	28.43%	2,687	52.51%	975	19.05%
1972	3,097	61.82%	1,906	38.04%	7	0.14%
1976	2,383	33.08%	4,788	66.46%	33	0.46%
1980	3,768	43.07%	4,716	53.91%	264	3.02%
1984	6,439	57.38%	4,744	42.28%	38	0.34%
1988	5,991	42.51%	8,004	56.80%	97	0.69%
1992	4,980	34.41%	6,252	43.19%	3,242	22.40%
1996	6,323	43.35%	6,773	46.44%	1,489	10.21%
2000	10,310	56.31%	6,973	38.09%	1,025	5.60%
2004	13,290	56.70%	9,794	41.78%	357	1.52%
2008	13,817	53.02%	11,687	44.84%	558	2.14%
2012	14,033	57.32%	9,864	40.29%	584	2.39%
2016	16,328	56.96%	10,569	36.87%	1,768	6.17%
2020	20,516	55.81%	15,474	42.09%	772	2.10%
2024	23,301	58.54%	15,989	40.17%	516	1.30%

United States Senate election results for Bastrop County, Texas1
Year	Republican		Democratic		Third party(ies)	
Year	No.	%	No.	%	No.	%
2024	21,835	55.35%	16,445	41.69%	1,166	2.96%

United States Senate election results for Bastrop County, Texas2
Year	Republican		Democratic		Third party(ies)	
Year	No.	%	No.	%	No.	%
2020	20,468	56.07%	15,071	41.28%	967	2.65%
2026	16,049	43.38%	20,074	54.26%	876	2.37%

Texas Gubernatorial election results for Bastrop County
Year	Republican		Democratic		Third party(ies)	
Year	No.	%	No.	%	No.	%
2022	16,707	57.15%	12,007	41.07%	521	1.78%
2026	17,253	46.37%	19,268	51.79%	683	1.84%

== See also ==
- List of museums in Central Texas
- National Register of Historic Places listings in Bastrop County, Texas
- Recorded Texas Historic Landmarks in Bastrop County
