= Smithville, Texas =

- City
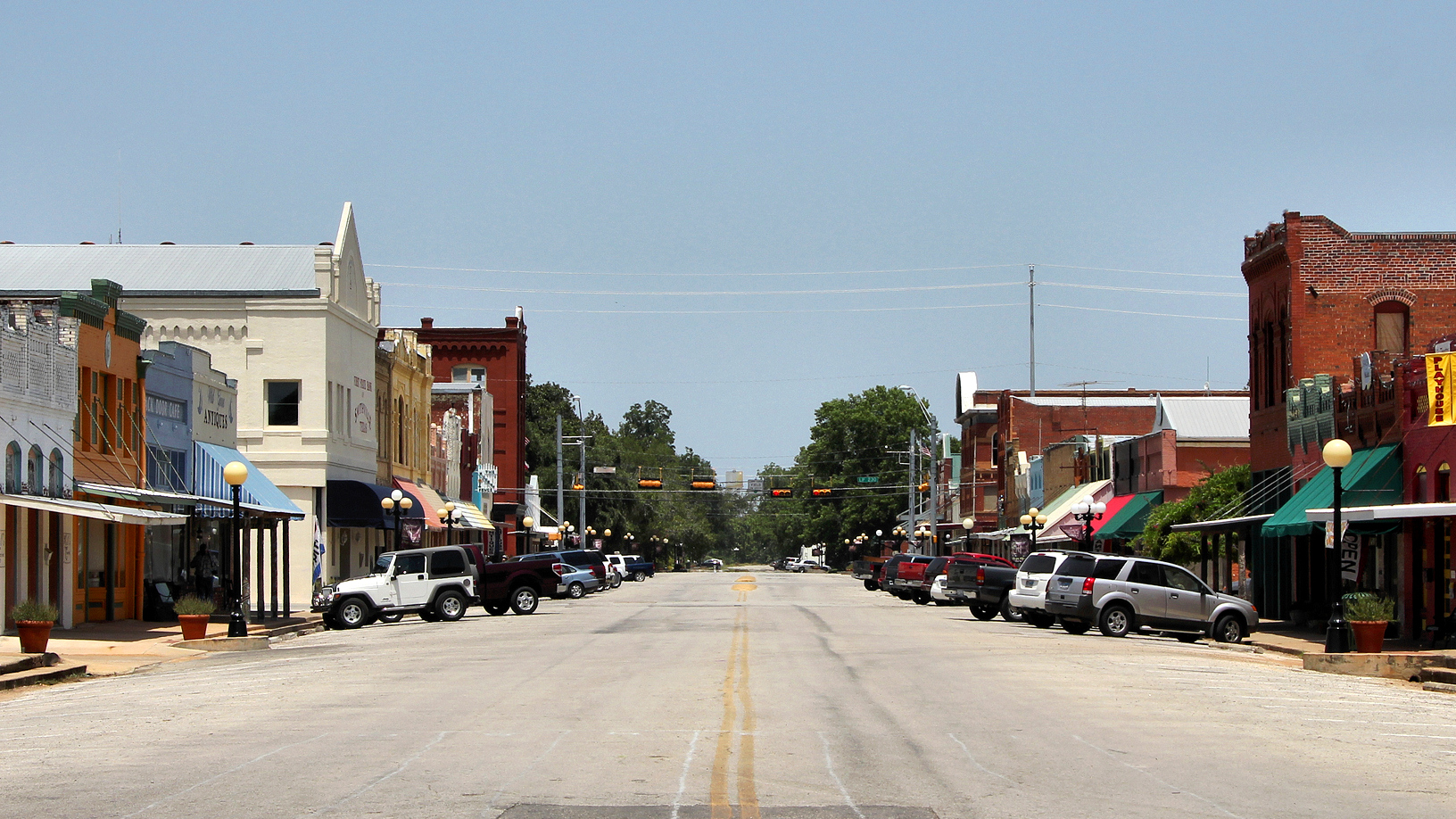
- Main Street
- Nickname: Heart of the Megalopolis
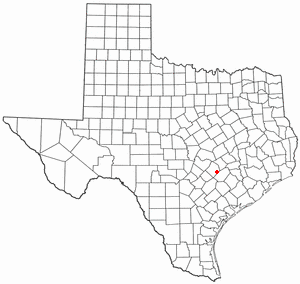
- Location of Smithville, Texas

- Coordinates: 30°00′16″N 97°08′56″W
- Country: United States
- State: Texas
- County: Bastrop
- Incorporated: 1895

Area
  - Total: 4.02 sq mi (10.40 km^{2})
  - Land: 4.00 sq mi (10.35 km^{2})
  - Water: 0.019 sq mi (0.05 km^{2})
- Elevation: 325 ft (99 m)

Population (2020)
  - Total: 3,922
  - Density: 1,130.1/sq mi (436.32/km^{2})
- Time zone: UTC-6 (Central (CST))
  - Summer (DST): UTC-5 (CDT)
- ZIP code: 78957
- Area codes: 512, 737
- FIPS code: 48-68456
- GNIS feature ID: 2411912
- Website: www.ci.smithville.tx.us

Smithville is a city in Bastrop County, Texas, United States, near the Colorado River. The population was 3,922 at the 2020 census.

== History ==
Thomas Jefferson Gazley arrived in 1827 and set the pace of development for Smithville by building the first house and establishing the first store, which served incoming settlers. He served as a clerk in the Mexican government. Later he signed the Texas Declaration of Independence and then served as a legislator in the Second Congress of the Republic of Texas.

William Smith's family arrived several years after Gazley. They also owned a store and were early influences on the area, including the naming of Smithville where about seventeen families lived on the south bank of the Colorado River.

Local businessman Murray Burleson persuaded the approaching railroad to erect a terminus here and the TB&H steamed through in 1887. The Missouri, Kansas & Texas took over the Taylor, Bastrop, and Houston Railroad in 1891. In 1894, the MK&T established central shops in Smithville, spurring growth which resulted in Smithville becoming the largest town in Bastrop County for nearly fifty years.

This population increase lead to a demand in housing, stores, and other necessities as it grew from a frontier village to a town. The Hill family moved retail marketing here and established the first bank. The need for infrastructure systems attracted the Buescher brothers to come and create the first utilities. Partnerships of prominent men involved in land-based activities united the Bueschers, Powells, Cooks, Eaglestons, Turneys, Rabbs, Buntes and others to establish cotton gins, general stores, drugstores, lumber and brickyards and to develop numerous churches and fraternal organizations such as the Masons and the Oddfellows and to provide medical care for the community.

In 1895, this thriving town was officially incorporated into the City of Smithville.

== Geography ==
The Colorado River at Smithville.

Smithville is located in southeastern Bastrop County mostly south of the Colorado River. It is 12 miles (19 km) southeast of Bastrop and 42 miles (68 km) southeast of Austin. The town rests at an elevation of roughly 325 feet above sea level.

=== Climate ===
Climate data for Smithville, Texas
Month	Jan	Feb	Mar	Apr	May	Jun	Jul	Aug	Sep	Oct	Nov	Dec	Year
Record high °F (°C)	88 (31)	91 (33)	98 (37)	99 (37)	99 (37)	100 (38)	102 (39)	104 (40)	108 (42)	100 (38)	91 (33)	90 (32)	107 (42)
Mean daily maximum °F (°C)	60 (16)	65 (18)	74 (23)	76 (24)	82 (28)	87 (31)	92 (33)	93 (34)	91 (33)	84 (29)	76 (24)	61 (16)	95 (35)
Mean daily minimum °F (°C)	40 (4)	46 (8)	57 (14)	65 (18)	70 (21)	72 (22)	77 (25)	79 (26)	72 (22)	64 (18)	56 (13)	32 (0)	59 (15)
Record low °F (°C)	4 (−16)	12 (−11)	14 (−10)	30 (−1)	43 (6)	50 (10)	59 (15)	54 (12)	47 (8)	22 (−6)	10 (−12)	3 (−16)	3 (−16)
Average precipitation inches (mm)	1.71 (43)	2.65 (67)	5.51 (140)	6.2 (160)	5.38 (137)	7.46 (189)	0.84 (21)	0.68 (17)	1.83 (46)	3.22 (82)	3.10 (79)	9.60 (244)	57.59 (1,463)
Source: weather.com

According to the United States Census Bureau, the city has a total area of 3.5 square miles (9.1 km^{2}), of which 3.5 square miles (9.1 km^{2}) is land and 0.04 square miles (0.10 km^{2}) (0.85%) is water.

== Highways ==
- SH 71
- Loop 230
- FM 2571
- FM 153
- FM 2104
- SH 95

== Demographics ==
Historical population
Census	Pop.	Note	%±
1890	616		—
1900	2,577		318.3%
1910	3,167		22.9%
1920	3,204		1.2%
1930	3,296		2.9%
1940	3,100		−5.9%
1950	3,379		9.0%
1960	2,933		−13.2%
1970	2,959		0.9%
1980	3,470		17.3%
1990	3,196		−7.9%
2000	3,901		22.1%
2010	3,817		−2.2%
2020	3,922		2.8%
U.S. Decennial Census

=== 2020 census ===
As of the 2020 census, Smithville had a population of 3,922. The median age was 42.7 years. 23.6% of residents were under the age of 18 and 21.1% of residents were 65 years of age or older. For every 100 females there were 88.4 males, and for every 100 females age 18 and over there were 85.1 males age 18 and over.

0.0% of residents lived in urban areas, while 100.0% lived in rural areas.

There were 1,634 households in Smithville, of which 30.8% had children under the age of 18 living in them. Of all households, 42.7% were married-couple households, 17.1% were households with a male householder and no spouse or partner present, and 34.8% were households with a female householder and no spouse or partner present. About 31.0% of all households were made up of individuals and 16.1% had someone living alone who was 65 years of age or older.

There were 1,869 housing units, of which 12.6% were vacant. The homeowner vacancy rate was 2.2% and the rental vacancy rate was 9.2%.

Racial composition as of the 2020 census
Race	Number	Percent
White	2,715	69.2%
Black or African American	445	11.3%
American Indian and Alaska Native	21	0.5%
Asian	36	0.9%
Native Hawaiian and Other Pacific Islander	1	0.0%
Some other race	231	5.9%
Two or more races	473	12.1%
Hispanic or Latino (of any race)	840	21.4%

=== 2000 census ===
As of the 2000 census, there were 3,901 people, 1,491 households, and 990 families residing in the city. The population density was 1,112.7 inhabitants per square mile (429.6/km^{2}). There were 1,672 housing units at an average density of 476.9 per square mile (184.1/km^{2}). The racial makeup of the city was 78.01% White, 14.53% African American, 0.31% Native American, 0.41% Asian, 5.10% from other races, and 1.64% from two or more races. Hispanic or Latino of any race were 15.43% of the population.

There were 1,491 households, out of which 31.0% had children under the age of 18 living with them, 49.0% were married couples living together, 13.8% had a female householder with no husband present, and 33.6% were non-families. 28.6% of all households were made up of individuals, and 14.6% had someone living alone who was 65 years of age or older. The average household size was 2.53 and the average family size was 3.15.

In the city, the population was spread out, with 27.2% under the age of 18, 7.3% from 18 to 24, 27.3% from 25 to 44, 19.3% from 45 to 64, and 18.9% who were 65 years of age or older. The median age was 37 years. For every 100 females, there were 88.3 males. For every 100 females age 18 and over, there were 82.9 males.

The median income for a household in the city was $35,586, and the median income for a family was $45,163. Males had a median income of $33,500 versus $23,409 for females. The per capita income for the city was $16,282. About 12.1% of families and 15.9% of the population were below the poverty line, including 21.2% of those under age 18 and 17.9% of those age 65 or over.

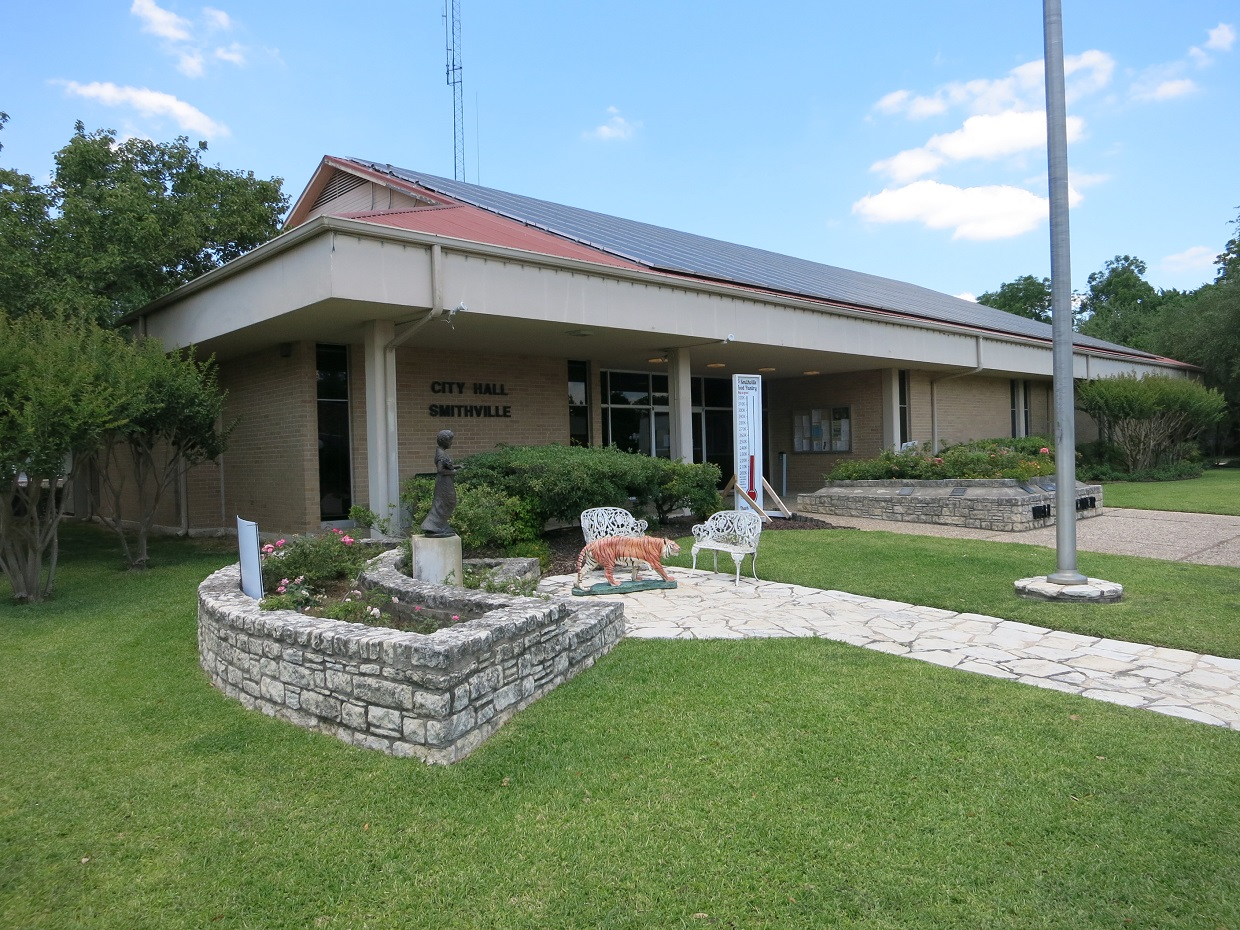
Smithville City Hall on Main Street.

== Government ==
The City of Smithville operates under a Council-Manager form of local government. In this structure, the mayor and city council set community goals and policy, while the city manager oversees day-to-day municipal operations. The governing body consists of an elected mayor and five city council members. All positions are elected at-large, meaning each council member represents the entire city rather than a specific geographic district or ward.

== Education ==
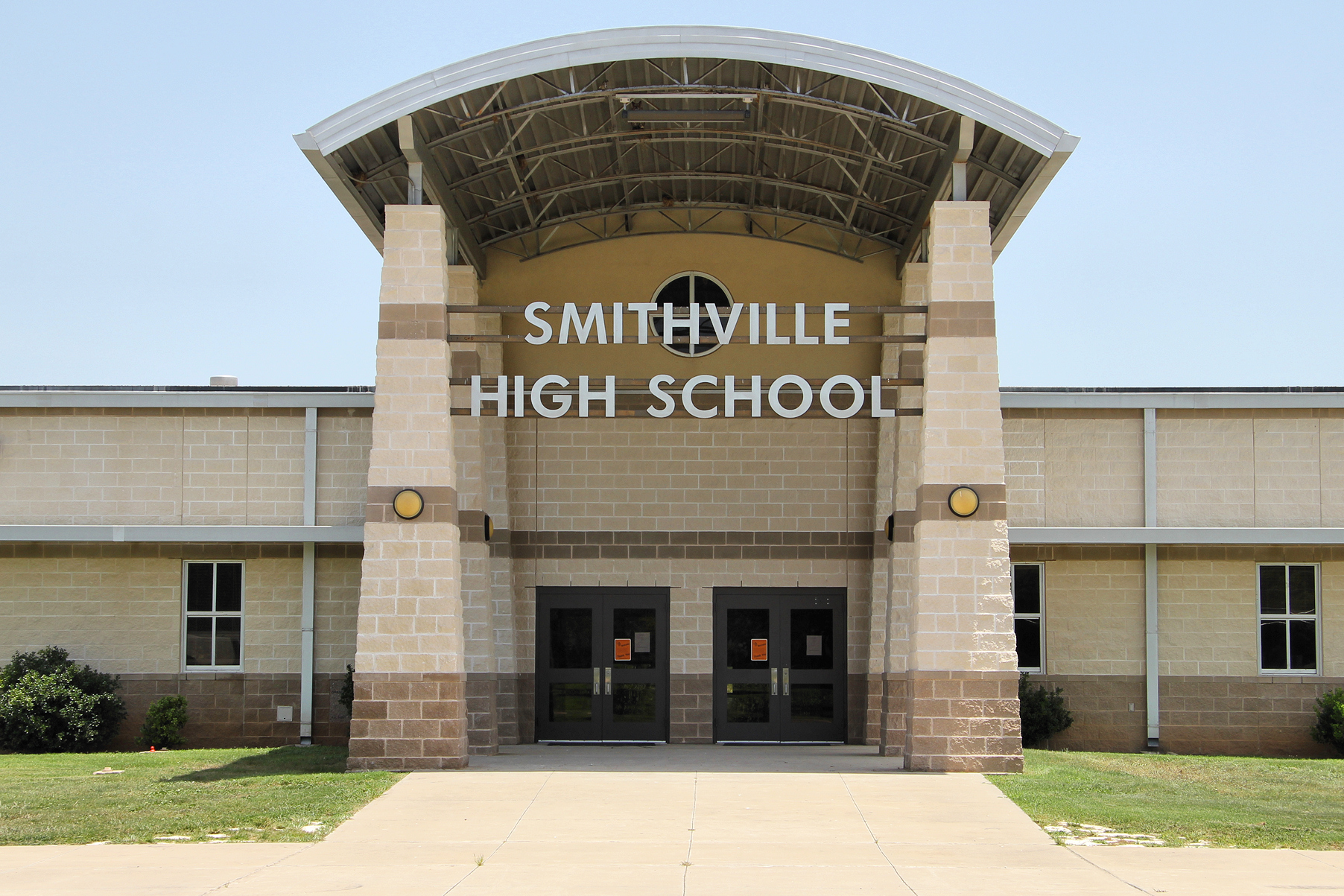
Smithville High School

Smithville is served by the Smithville Independent School District and home to the Smithville High School Tigers.

Austin Community College, which has an attendance area covering most school districts in Bastrop County, has a campus in nearby Elgin, and Austin, 40 miles (64 km) to the west, boasts multiple major universities.

== Points of interest ==
The James H. Long Railroad Museum & Smithville Area Chamber of Commerce.

- The Smithville Visitor Center, James H. Long Railroad Museum & Chamber of Commerce, located at 100 Main Street in Smithville, contains exhibits and relics from Smithville's railroad history.
- The Smithville post office contains an oil on canvas mural, The Law, Texas Rangers, painted in 1939 by Minette Teichmueller. Murals were produced from 1934 to 1943 in the United States through the Section of Painting and Sculpture, later called the Section of Fine Arts, of the Treasury Department. The WPA was the largest and most ambitious American New Deal agency, employing individuals to carry out public works projects.

Public murals were installed in Smithville in 2018 and 2019 depicting scenes from important Smithville events and murals of local leaders.

== Notable people ==
- Bettye Caldwell, educator
- Thomas Carter, actor and Emmy Award-winning director
- Hannibal Lokumbe (also known as "Hannibal"), jazz trumpeter and composer
- Balor Moore, major league baseball pitcher born in Smithville
- Sonny Rhodes, blues singer and lap steel guitar player
- DJ Screw (Robert Earl Davis Jr.), hip hop artist; born in Smithville and later moved to Houston

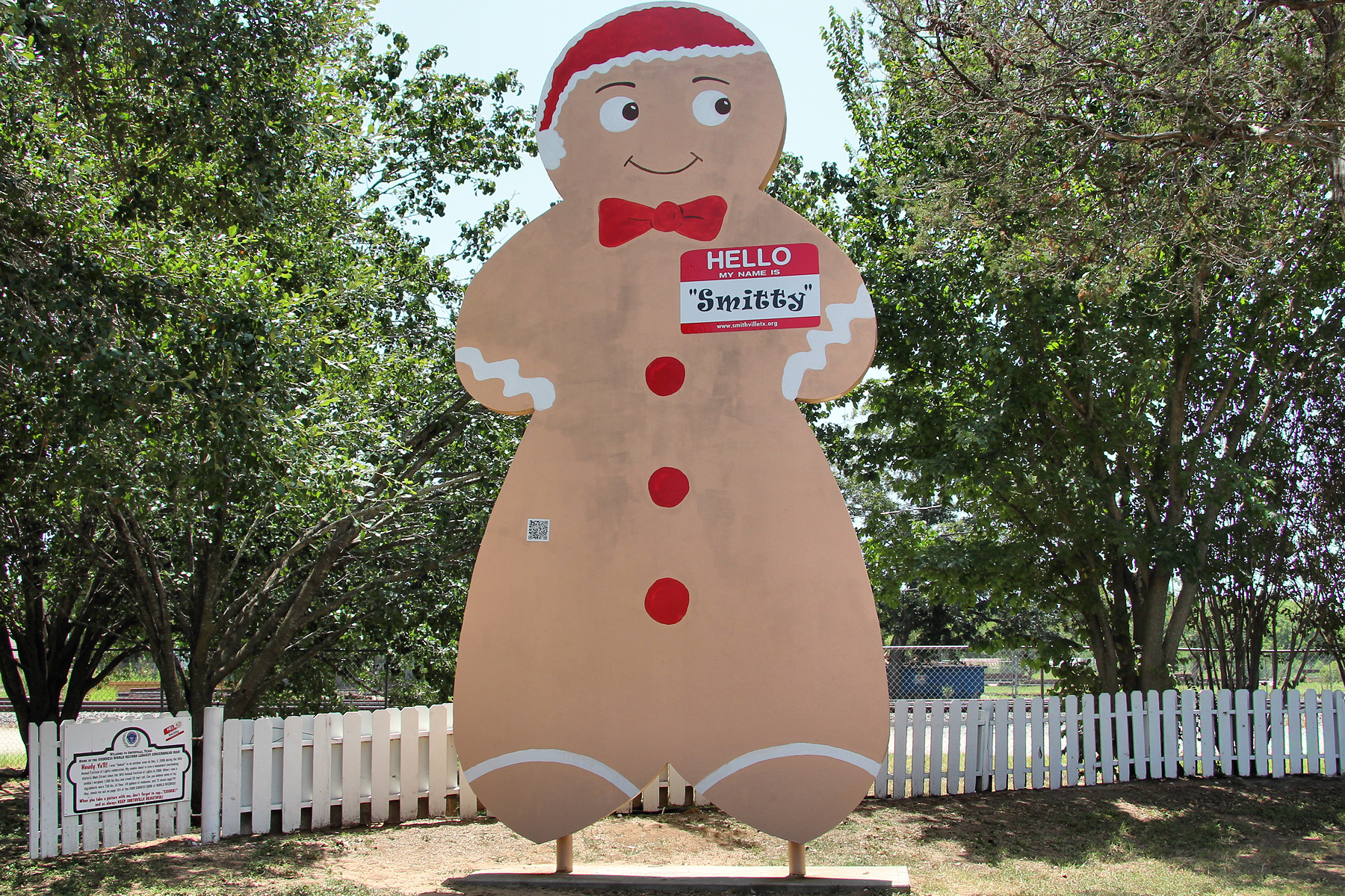
Smitty the Gingerbread Man

== Guinness World Records ==
On December 2, 2006, at the city's 16th Annual Festival of Lights, Smithville broke the Guinness World Record for the world's largest gingerbread man. The record breaking "man" measured over 20 feet (6.1 m) long and weighed 1,308.5 lb (593.5 kilograms). Some of the ingredients used were 750 pounds of flour, 49 gallons of molasses and 72 dozen eggs. The pan used in the baking now stands as a monument at the James H. Long Railroad Park in Smithville. The record has since been broken by a Norwegian IKEA display.
