= Smithville Independent School District =

School district in Texas, United States

Coordinates: 30.0086°N 97.1594°W

- The Smithville Independent School District central administration building

Location
- Smithville, Texas ESC Region 13 US

District information
- Type: Public Independent school district
- Grades: EE through 12
- Superintendent: Cheryl Burns
- Schools: 5 (2011–12)
- NCES District ID: 4840550

Students and staff
- Students: 1770 (2012-13)
- Teachers: 122.62 (2011–12) (on full-time equivalent (FTE) basis)
- Student–teacher ratio: 14.06 (2011–12)

Other information
- Website: Smithville ISD

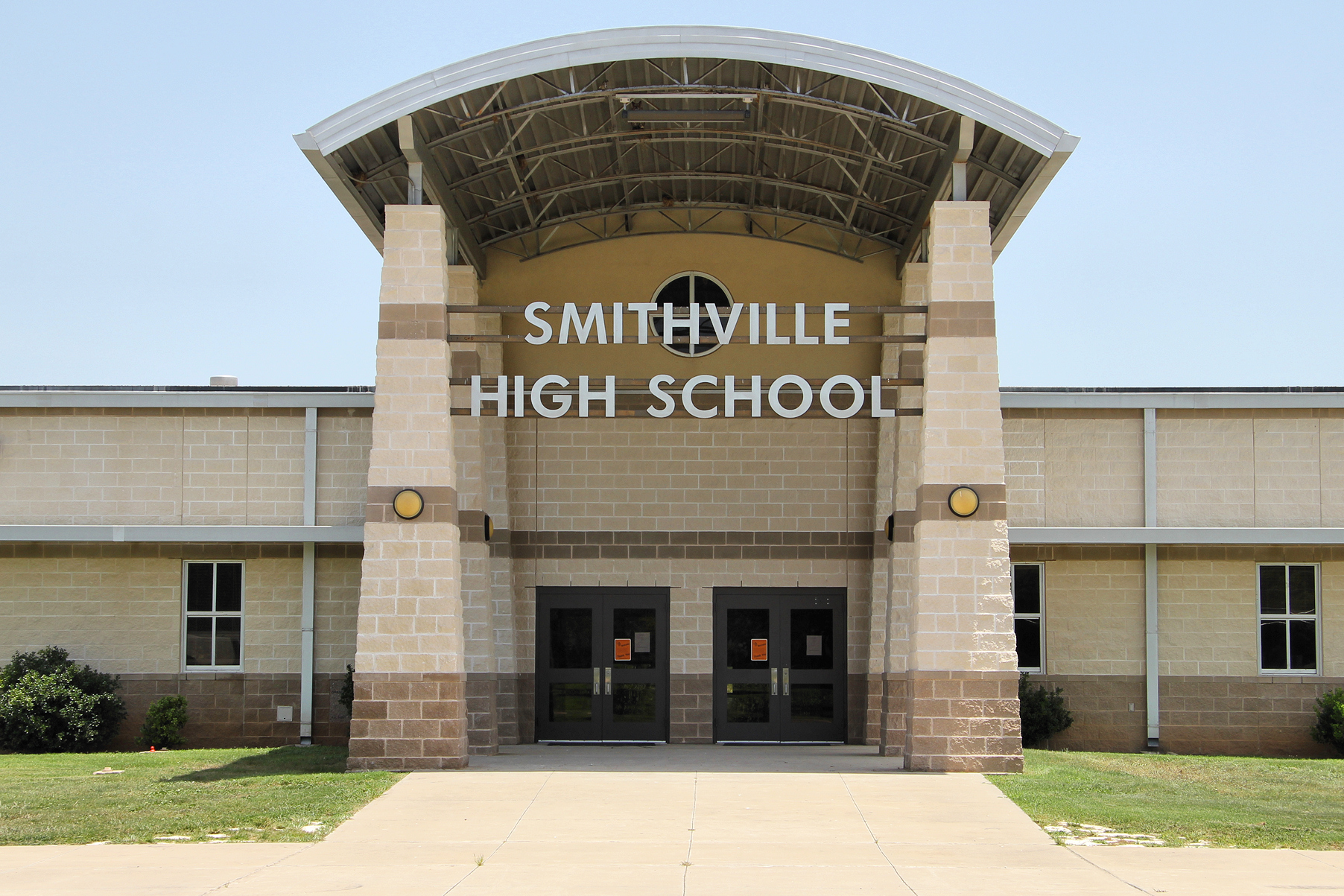
Smithville High School

Smithville Independent School District is a public school district based in Smithville, Texas (US). Located in Bastrop County, it serves Smithville and Rosanky, a small portion of the district extends into Fayette County.

In 2009, the school district was rated "academically acceptable" by the Texas Education Agency.

Smithville ISD is in the service area of Austin Community College.

== History ==
Smithville ISD was formally established in 1920 as an independent school district through the state legislature.

In 1962, the Center Union school (which originally served local Black students) was consolidated into SISD.

During the 1969–1970 school year, Smithville ISD gave three black students to an all-African American school district, Jeddo Common School District, which meant that the Jeddo district continued to exist. Without the student transfer, it would not have received enough students to get funding for its teacher. A legal document in Texas cited this as a case of de facto segregation.

== Schools ==
In the 2012–13 school year, the district had students in five schools.

- Smithville High School (Grades 9–12)
- Smithville Junior High School (Grades 6–8)
- Smithville Elementary School (Grades (3–5)
- Brown Primary School (Grades EE-2)
- Bastrop County Juvenile Boot Camp (Grades 4–12)
