= Richard Starcke House =

Richard Starcke House may refer to:

- Richard Starcke House (710 Water Street), Bastrop, Texas, listed on the National Register of Historic Places
- Richard Starcke House (703 Main Street), Bastrop, Texas
