= George Washington Jones House =

George Washington Jones House may refer to:

- George Washington Jones House (Bastrop, Texas), listed on the NRHP in Bastrop County, Texas
- George Washington Jones House (Marcellus, Michigan), listed as a Michigan State Historic Site in and on the NRHP in Michigan
