= Jenkins House (Bastrop, Texas) =

Historic house in Texas, United States

- U.S. National Register of Historic Places
- Recorded Texas Historic Landmark
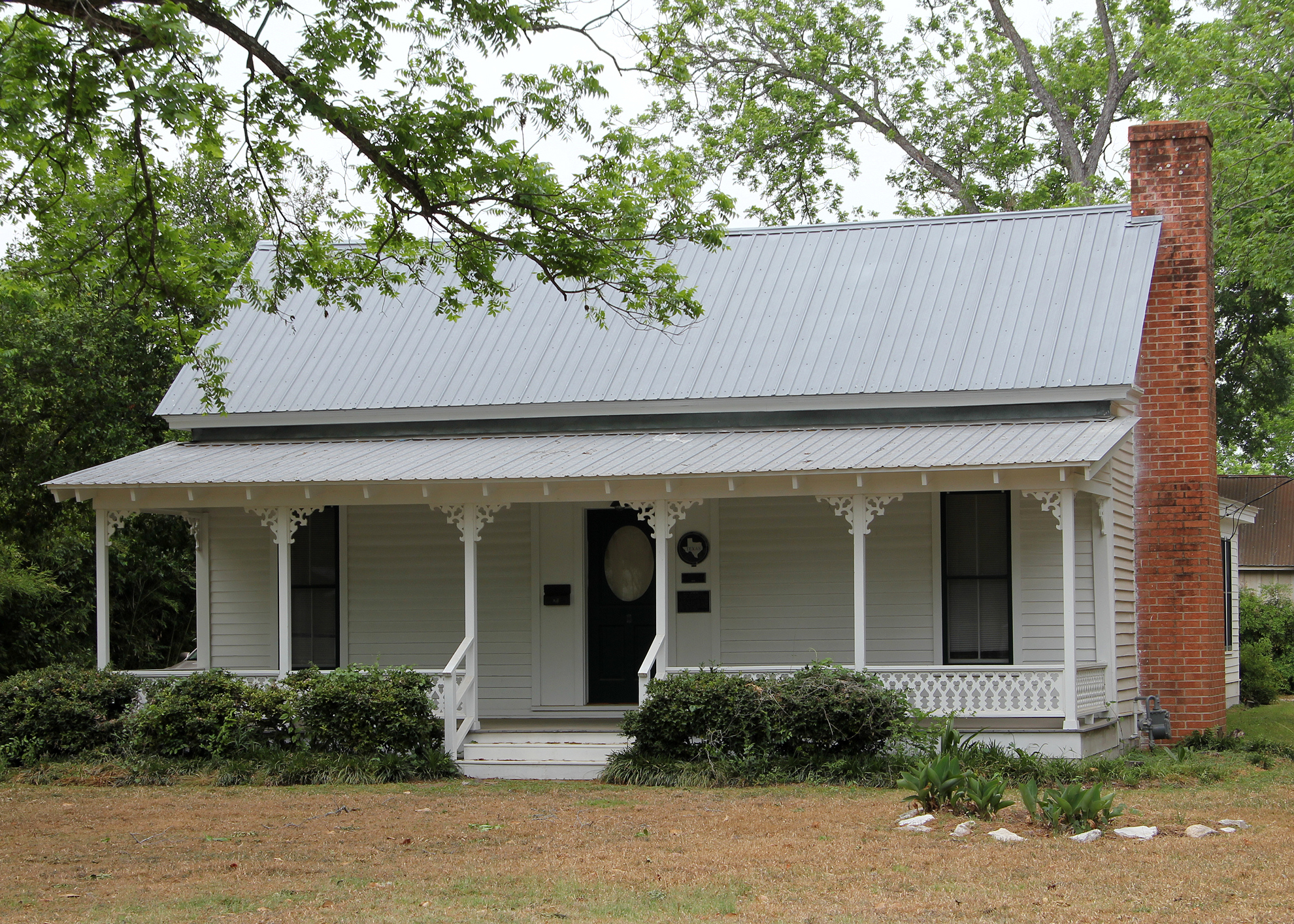
- Jenkins House in 2011

- Location within Texas Location within the United States
- Location: 1710 Main St., Bastrop, Texas
- Coordinates: 30°7′8″N 97°19′14″W
- Area: less than one acre
- Built: 1836
- Architect: Ed & John Jenkins
- Architectural style: Late Victorian, Symmetrical Victorian
- MPS: Bastrop Historic and Architectural MRA
- NRHP reference No.: 78003299
- RTHL No.: 9201

Significant dates
- Added to NRHP: December 22, 1978
- Designated RTHL: 1964

The Jenkins House is a historic home in Bastrop, Texas. It was built about 1836 for Sarah Jenkins. Her first husband was killed by Indians. Her second was killed at the Battle of the Alamo.

The Jenkins House started as a single-room log cabin and then was enlarged to a two-room log cabin with a "dog-trot" between rooms. A kitchen and dining "ell" was added in subsequent years, and finally, the dog-trot opening was enclosed as a hall, the house sided with clapboard, and a porch running the length of the building added to create its present Victorian appearance. The house was designated a Recorded Texas Historic Landmark in 1964. It was listed on the National Register of Historic Places on December 22, 1978.

== See also ==
- National Register of Historic Places listings in Bastrop County, Texas
- Recorded Texas Historic Landmarks in Bastrop County
