= White House (Bastrop, Texas) =

Historic house in Texas, United States

- U.S. National Register of Historic Places
- Recorded Texas Historic Landmark
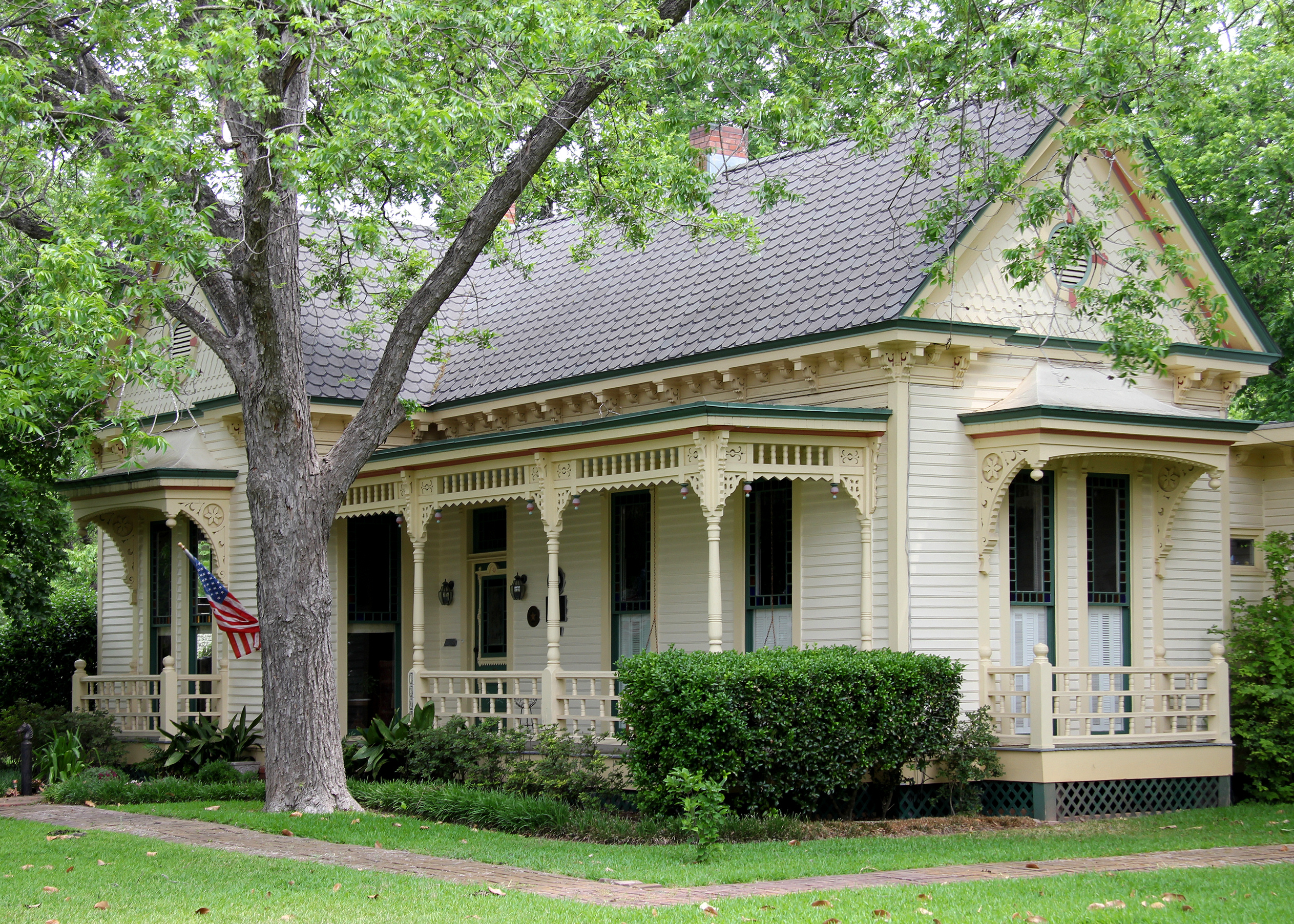
- White House in 2011

- Location within Texas Location within the United States
- Location: 1307 Main St., Bastrop, Texas
- Coordinates: 30°6′52″N 97°19′11″W
- Area: less than one acre
- Built: 1890
- Architectural style: Late Victorian
- MPS: Bastrop Historic and Architectural MRA
- NRHP reference No.: 78003265
- RTHL No.: 9283

Significant dates
- Added to NRHP: December 22, 1978
- Designated RTHL: 1983

The White House in Bastrop, Texas, is a one-story Late Victorian cottage built in c.1890. It was listed on the National Register of Historic Places in 1978.

It was listed as part of a study of historic resources in the Bastrop area which listed a number of sites to the National Register.

== See also ==
- National Register of Historic Places listings in Bastrop County, Texas
- Recorded Texas Historic Landmarks in Bastrop County
