= Kerr Community Center =

- U.S. National Register of Historic Places
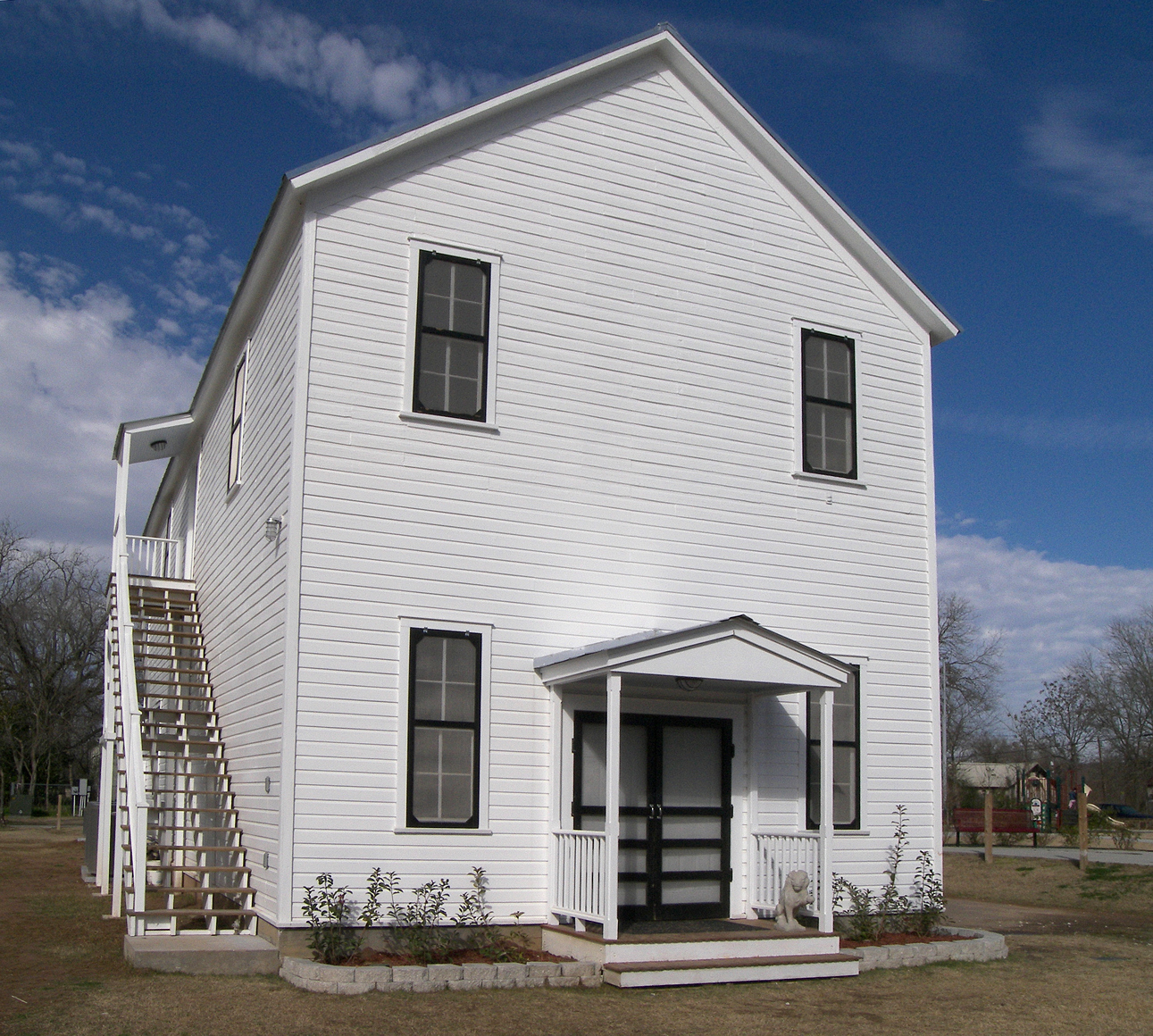
- Kerr Community Center 2008

- Location within Texas Location within the United States
- Location: 1308 Walnut St., Bastrop, Texas
- Coordinates: 30°6′31″N 97°19′2″W
- Area: less than one acre
- Built: 1914
- MPS: Bastrop Historic and Architectural MRA
- NRHP reference No.: 78003339
- Added to NRHP: December 22, 1978

The Kerr Community Center, originally called Kerr Hall, is a community center located in Bastrop, Texas, United States. The hall was a gathering spot for the African-American community of Bastrop during the time of racial segregation in the United States. The structure was listed in the National Register of Historic Places on December 22, 1978.

Kerr Community Center is a two-story wood-frame structure built in 1914 by Beverly and Lula Kerr on a lot directly behind their own home. The center hosted social events and artistic performances by black artists such as master blues pianist Roosevelt Williams, known to his fans as "Grey Ghost." During World War II, the structure served as a USO post for the black soldiers assigned to Camp Swift.

Beverly Kerr died in 1941 and Lula Kerr died in 1944. In 1946, some local citizens formed the Kerr Center Association and purchased the building from the Kerr estate. The center had an official dedication in 1952. The building received major renovations that were completed in 2007 including a small park and playground.

== See also ==
- National Register of Historic Places listings in Bastrop County, Texas
