= Crocheron–McDowall House =

Historic house in Bastrop, Texas, United States

- U.S. National Register of Historic Places
- Recorded Texas Historic Landmark
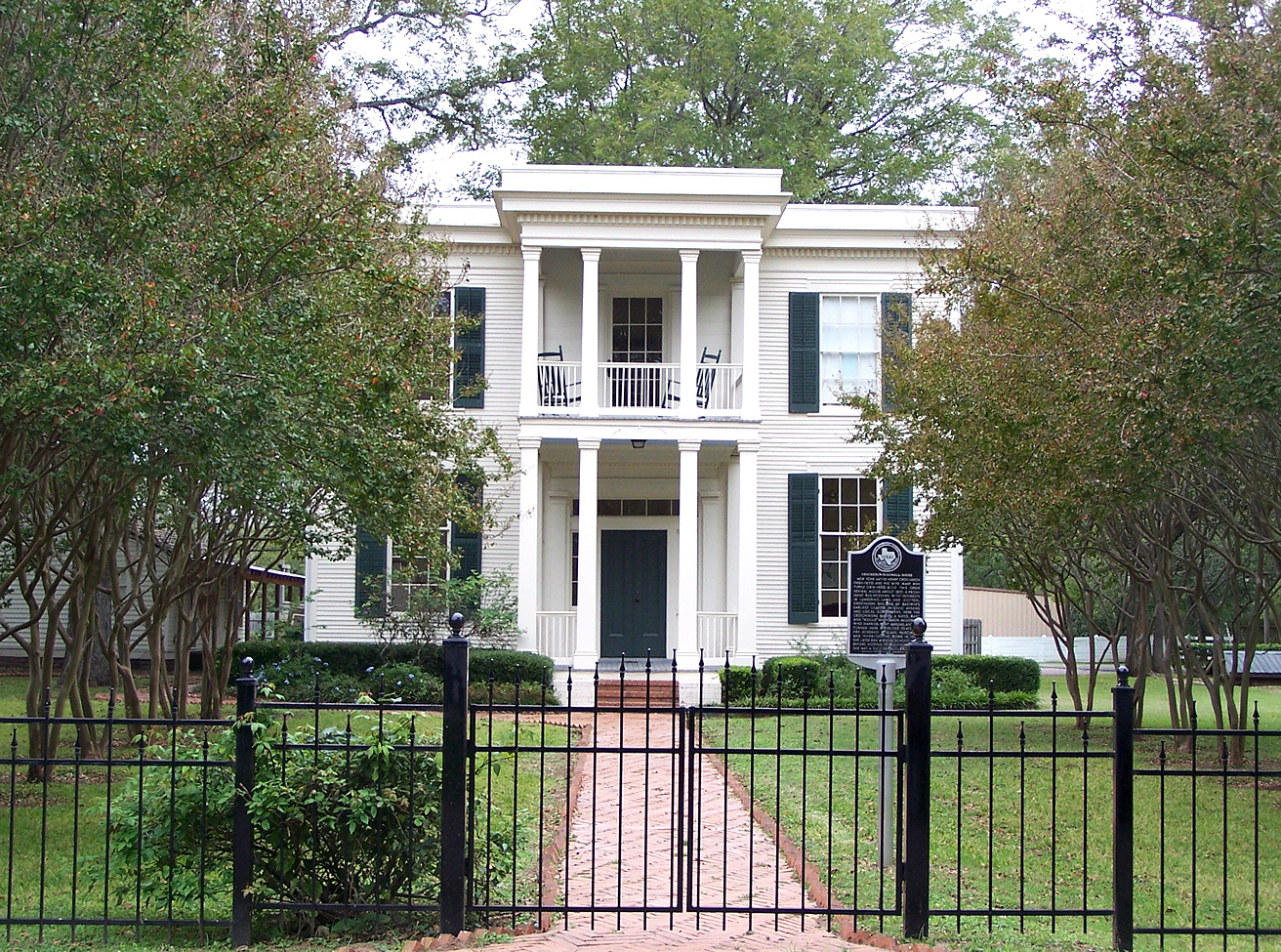
- Crocheron–McDowall House in 2006

- Location within Texas Location within the United States
- Location: 1506 Wilson St., Bastrop, Texas, United States
- Coordinates: 30°06′57″N 97°19′20″W
- Area: 1.3 acres (0.53 ha)
- Built: 1857
- Architectural style: Greek Revival
- MPS: Bastrop Historic and Architectural MRA
- NRHP reference No.: 78003357
- RTHL No.: 9174

Significant dates
- Added to NRHP: 20 April 1978
- Designated RTHL: 1962

The Crocheron–McDowall House is a two-story Greek Revival-style house located in Bastrop, Texas, United States. The house was built in 1857 for wealthy New York merchant Henry Crocheron and his wife Mary Ann Tipple. Crocheron wanted a home that displayed his wealth, and built it with the finest-available materials and architectural decorations. After his death in 1874, Crocheron's niece Mary Ann McDowall (née Nicholson) inherited the property. She was an accomplished musician and held music classes at the residence. During the late 1800s, the residence was the social and intellectual center of Bastrop, and hosted prominent guests. The house was sold after McDowall died in 1933. Since then, the property has had several owners who have shown interest in preserving and restoring the property for its historical significance.

== History ==
The Crocheron–McDowall House is located on 1506 Wilson Street in downtown Bastrop, Texas, United States. The property was originally a farm owned by Confederate judge William Pinckney Hill, who was granted the land by a corporation in Bastrop on 2 July 1838. After failing to pay property taxes, however, Bastrop County authorities seized the farm. Wealthy New York merchant Henry Crocheron bought the land on 1 April 1841 for (equivalent to $4,369 in 2025) in a sheriff's sale. The house's construction began under the direction of architect Marcello Triplett. It was built for Crocheron and his wife Mary Ann Tipple, and was completed by 1857. (Note: The date generally cited by most sources for the house's completion is 1857. Mary Ann McDowall (née Nicholson) said in her memoir the house was finished in 1852 or 1853, recalling the home was finished when she was 10 years old.) Crocheron was originally from Staten Island; he moved to Bastrop from Alabama in 1837. When he arrived in Bastrop, he sold 12 slaves and used the proceeds to buy several properties and create Bastrop Steam Mill, the city's first industrial enterprise. He was one of the earliest local leaders to become involved in civic affairs and politics.

In 1861, the completion of the house coincided with the outbreak of the American Civil War. Mary Ann McDowall (formerly Nicholson and affectionately called "Mollie"), Crocheron's niece, took residence in the house amid the wartime circumstances. During June 1861, Confederate Captain George Washington Jones, along with the Bastrop Volunteers—the inaugural company from Bastrop to join the Civil War—conducted a flag presentation ceremony at the Crocheron–McDowall House. This event marked the commencement of Bastrop's participation in the conflict, and Nicholson was present to welcome them.

Throughout the conflict, Crocheron engaged in the importation of commercial goods to Bastrop from England and Matamoros, Tamaulipas, Mexico. In 1864, while on a business trip to Matamoros, Nicholson encountered William McDowall, a British individual. Their marriage took place at the Crocheron–McDowall House on May 14, 1868, following which they relocated to London, England. Later in the same year, William McDowall succumbed to yellow fever, a disease he contracted during a business journey to Central America. In 1869, Mary Ann, accompanied by her three-month-old daughter Ruth, returned to Bastrop to reside with Crocheron. Following Crocheron's death in 1874, McDowall inherited the house as specified in his will.

Mary Ann McDowall, a proficient musician, imparted her musical expertise by offering classes in piano, organ, guitar, and voice at the Crocheron residence. The house evolved into the focal point of Bastrop's social and intellectual life, hosting numerous parties, lectures, and concerts. Eminent figures, including Gail Borden, the inventor of condensed milk, and two nieces of U.S. President James K. Polk, were counted among the distinguished visitors who either stayed at or frequented the residence. Following the passing of her daughter Ruth in 1897, McDowall relocated to Houston to reside with her sister, actively participating in various clubs and organizations.

After McDowall's death in 1933, the house changed ownership multiple times, with subsequent owners expressing a keen interest in its preservation and restoration. Presently, the house serves as a private residence and is not accessible to the general public. On occasion, it functions as a conference center for the Lower Colorado River Authority (LCRA).

== Historical designations ==
The Crocheron–McDowall House is one of several preserved mansions in Bastrop that remain substantially similar to their original external designs. On 12 September 1936, Arthur W. Stewart, a photographer from the Historic American Buildings Survey (HABS), went to the Crocheron–McDowall House, exposed five photographs and made eight measured drawings, and created two data sheets as part of a national historic preservation effort. The images taken at the scene were archived in the Library of Congress and are available digitally. In 1962, the Crocheron–McDowall House was accepted as a Recorded Texas Historic Landmark (RTHL). It received its building medallion the following year. On October 29, 1976, the State Board Review of the Texas Historical Commission (THC) met to discuss nominating the building for inclusion on the National Register of Historic Places (NRHP).

THC members Joe Williams and David Moore nominated the Crocheron–McDowall House for the NRHP on November 16, 1977. On the nomination form, they included a detailed historical summary of the property, including a biography of Crocheran and McDowall, and its architectural elements. The house was included on the NRHP on April 20, 1978. In the register data sheet, the house's condition is described as fair and in need of foundational repair. They also included details of an alteration at the building's rear. The NRHP described the property as one of the "finest and most intact" Greek Revival buildings in Texas. The owners at the time of the designation were James "Jim" Haber and L.N. Duduy, during whose ownership a federal grant given to the THC was used to restore the property.

== Architecture ==
According to the NRHP and the THC, the Crocheron–McDowall House is one of the most-exemplary Greek Revival architecture sites in Texas. Crocheron decided to build a home that would symbolize his affluence; materials were of the finest quality available. The house was the only residence in Bastrop to be constructed almost entirely of cedar wood and the first to include window weights. The windows and a hand-carved banister were imported from New York and shipped to Galveston, and then transported by rail and wagon to Bastrop. According to an early account in the Bastrop city archives, Crocheron owned a mill and personally chose which logs to use for his home. He hired carpenter George Orts to build most of the house with cedar wood. The account also says the floor was made of pine wood. In its early years, the house was not weather-proof but Crocheron later added a cornice and irons on the house's corners.

The original structure of the house consisted of a two-story main building and a one-story section at the back. It also included a detailed cornice on its flat roof on the main structure but this was altered after years of deterioration. The original dentil molding, however, remains in good condition and is visible throughout the structure. The gable roof ell wing on the west rear includes the same dentil molding as the main building. The front portico was inspired by Palladian architecture and is present in other historic Bastrop residences. This feature was common in Texan homes during the American Civil War. The house's attic served as the guest room, where prominent visitors spent time when visiting Crocheron and his family.

Both of the floors are supported by four squared wooden columns; the ones on the first floor are taller and thicker than those on the second floor. The first story's double doors are decorated with entablatures and pilasters. The second floor's entrance opens up to a balcony that was once enclosed by a slat balustrade; this was later replaced with a cross-diagonal one. Entablatures and pilasters decorate the second-floor doors while other pilasters in this floor match with the first-floor exterior pilasters.

As is typical of Greek Revival buildings, the Crocheron–McDowall House has an aba pattern in its three-bay east facade, as shown with the central portico and doors with windows flanking on each side. The first floor's windows have six overnight lights while the corresponding windows on the second floor have the same pattern of lights, which reinforce the building's symmetry of the home. All of these windows are framed with a molded trim. In the southern facade, the second floor is symmetrically pierced by three six-over-six light windows. The first story's west and central facades have six overnight light windows that are symmetrical to the second-floor openings. To the western rear, there is a one-story ell wing with a small entrance, with two six-over-six light windows with a seam-tin roof. Similar to the southern facade, the northern facade has three bays with three six overnight light windows on the first and second floors.

Among the most-distinctive features of the house is the stairway, which has a handmade walnut newel post and a decorated rail. Unlike other contemporaneous houses, the hallway extends to the front of the house. The hallway served as a "reception hall" that connected it with two large rooms, which were originally a parlor and a music room. The hallway had a stair that connected to the upper floor on the western end. Farther in the hallway is a kitchen area, a dining room, and a cistern room; each of these rooms have openings to the outside. The original detailing of the home included a 12-foot (3.7 m) ceiling and wainscoting. The additions made on the north side of the rear elevation included a small kitchen area and a bath.

== See also ==
- National Register of Historic Places listings in Bastrop County, Texas
- Recorded Texas Historic Landmarks in Bastrop County

== Bibliography ==
- Landon, Marie Deacon; Williams, Joe R.; Klein, Stan (November 25, 1977). Crocheron–McDowall House (PDF). National Register of Historic Places. 40967995 (National Archives Identifier). Archived from the original (PDF) on October 12, 2022 – via National Archives and Records Administration.
- Howard, Rex Zedrick (1954). Texas Guidebook: Authentic Information about The Wonders of Texas. Grand Prairie, Texas: The Lo-Ray Co. OCLC 1013305790.
- Perkins, Lucile Jackson (1954). The Local History Approach to Teaching Social Studies: A Compilation of Historical Data of Bastrop (PDF). The University of Texas at Austin.
- Kennedy, Roger G. (2013). Cotton and Conquest: How the Plantation System Acquired Texas. University of Oklahoma Press. ISBN 978-0806188928.
- US Congress (1950). Congressional Record Proceedings, Debates of the U.S. Congress. Vol. 96. U.S. Government Printing Office. ISSN 0883-1947.
- Moore, Bill (1977). Bastrop County, 1691–1900. Nortex Press. ISBN 089015127X.
- Thorp, Wendy Cloyd (1996). Historic Marker Application: Crocheron-McDowall House. Independence Heritage Region. Texas Historical Commission – via University of North Texas Libraries.
