= Lovie Yancey =

Fatburger restaurant chain founder (1912–2008)

- Born: Lovie Louise Yancey; January 3, 1912; Bastrop, Texas, U.S.
- Died: January 26, 2008 (aged 96); Olympia Medical Center, Los Angeles, California, U.S.
- Occupation: Restaurateur
- Years active: 1940–2008
- Known for: Founder of Fatburger
- Children: 1

Lovie Yancey (January 3, 1912 – January 26, 2008) was an American entrepreneur and founder of the Fatburger restaurant chain.

== Founding of Fatburger ==
Yancey originally owned a small restaurant in Tucson. In 1947, she founded Fatburger under its original name, Mr. Fatburger. In 1952, Yancey shed both her business partners and the "Mr." from the name of the hamburger stand, and Fatburger was officially born.“The name of the store was my idea,” Yancey said. “I wanted to get across the idea of a big burger with everything on it . . . a meal in itself.” From the beginning, Yancey was a fixture at the original Fatburger, where customers, who included entertainers such as Redd Foxx and Ray Charles, could custom-order their burgers. Yancey always claimed, "I don't worry about McDonald's, Burger King, or Wendy's. They may be more popular, but a good hamburger sells itself, and I don't think anybody makes as good a hamburger as we do."“Yancey was very hands-on in the business, sometimes working 16-hour shifts to ensure things ran smoothly, and burgers were cooked to perfection”

Yancey sold her Fatburger company to an investment group in 1990, but retained control of the original property on Western Avenue. There are now many Fatburger locations worldwide that are, "following Yancey’s original business model and theme." She established a $1.7-million endowment at City of Hope National Medical Center in Duarte in 1986 for research into sickle-cell anemia. This was in fulfillment of a promise to her 22-year-old grandson, Duran Farrell, who had died of the disease three years earlier.

== Death ==
On January 26, 2008, Yancey died at the age of ninety-six of pneumonia at the Olympia Medical Center in Los Angeles, California. In addition to her daughter, Yancey was survived by three grandchildren and five great-grandchildren.
