= Greenleaf Fisk =

American politician (1807–1888)

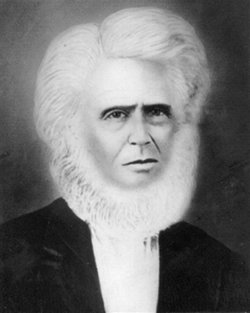

Member House of Representatives Republic of Texas
- In office 1838–1839

Member Texas Rangers
- In office 1836–1846

Personal details
- Born: May 19, 1807 Albany, New York, US
- Died: January 26, 1888 (aged 80) Brownwood, Texas, US
- Resting place: Greenleaf Cemetery, Brownwood
- Spouse(s): Mary Ann Manlove; Margaret Jane Manlove; Mary Piper Hawkins
- Children: 7 with Mary Ann Manlove; 8 with Mary Piper Hawkins
- Education: Lane's Theological Seminary, Cincinnati, Ohio; Hanover College

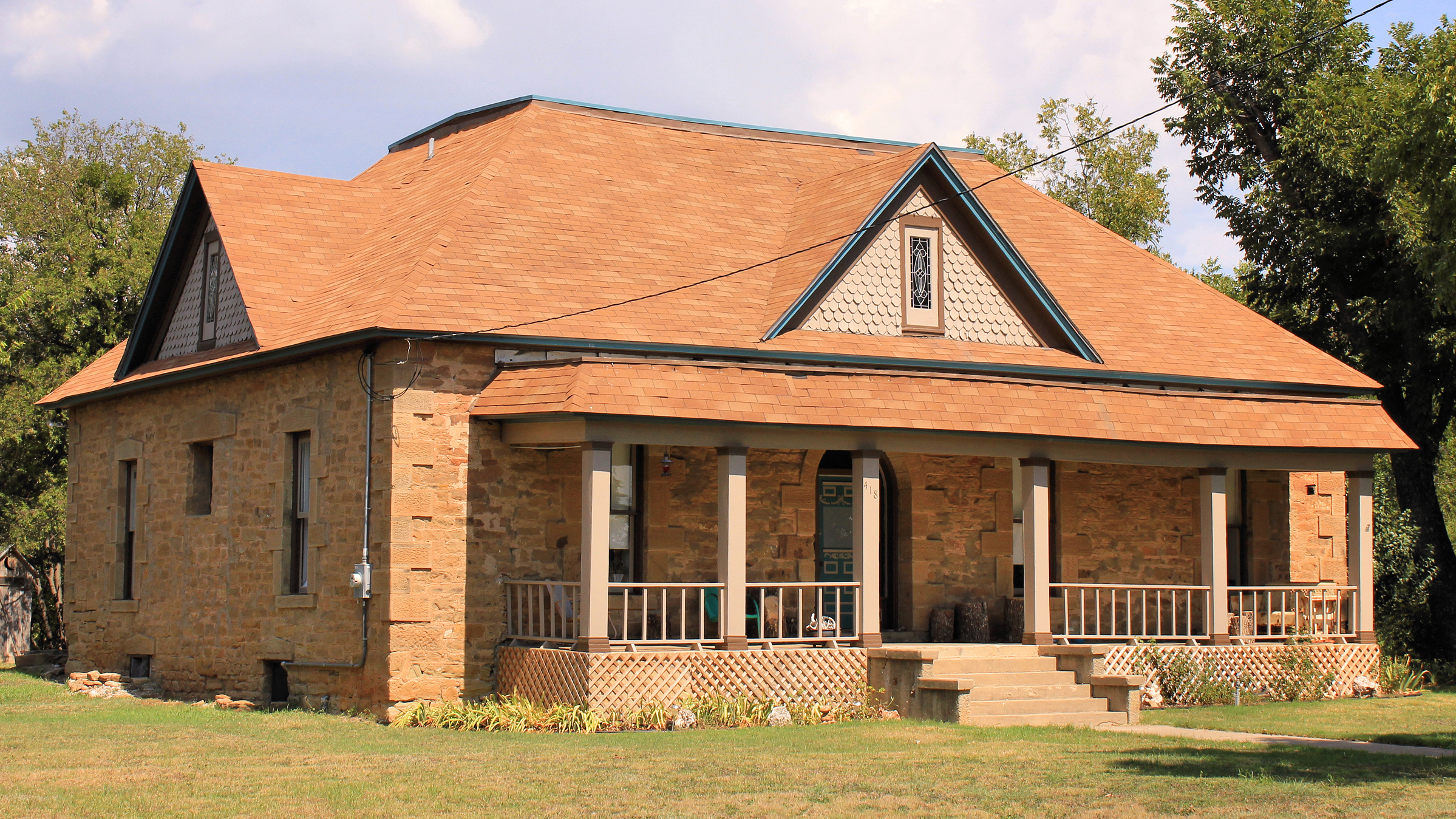
Greenleaf Fisk House Brownwood TX

Greenleaf Fisk (1807–1888) was a pioneer, known as "the Father of Brownwood, Texas". When a land and water dispute necessitated a new site for Brown County's seat of Brownwood, Fisk donated the land for the new location. He was a military veteran of the Texas Revolution and was a member of the Republic of Texas House of Representatives. Fisk was a Chief Justice when he lived in Bastrop, Texas. When he relocated his family to Brown County, he became a substantial land owner and served the people in several positions of local government. In 1968, the home of Greenleaf Fisk was designated a Recorded Texas Historic Landmark. February 25, 2004, the home was put on the National Register of Historic Places.

== Early years ==
Greenleaf Fisk was born in Penfield (Monroe County), New York on May 19, 1807 to Nathan Fisk and Rebecca Canfield Fisk. At the age of 12, Fisk worked on a dairy farm in New Jersey. Fisk originally intended to enter the Presbyterian ministry and enrolled in Lane Theological Seminary in Cincinnati, Ohio. He furthered his education at Hanover College in Indiana.

Many have errorenously reported that Greenleaf Fisk was born in Albany, New York (225 miles from Penfield), and repeatedly cited these inaccurate reports.

== Texas ==
In 1834, Fisk moved to Bastrop County in the community of Mina, which eventually became the city of Bastrop, where he met and married his first wife, Mary Ann Manlove, daughter of Col. Bartholomew "Bat" Manlove. He built a stagecoach inn on his property at 1005 Hill Street in Bastrop, as a wedding present for his bride. The house is now on the National Historic Register (#78003353). He later sold it and two more veterans of San Jacinto lived in the house—Jesse Halderman and Campbell Taylor.

Fisk enlisted in the company of Mina Volunteers, 49 Bastrop County men with Captain Jesse Billingsley, under Edward Burleson. Fisk missed participation in the Battle of San Jacinto that happened on April 21, 1836, due to the news of the defeat and death of James Fannin at the Goliad massacre on March 27, 1836. Upon hearing of the massacre, Burleson ordered several of the Mina Volunteers, including Fisk, to "guard the baggage at Harrisburg." But later, when he heard the settlers were in trouble on the Runaway Scrape, he ordered Fisk, John Holland Jenkins, and several other men to return to Bastrop to help the settlers who were fleeing the Mexicans. Fisk's name is on the wall of the San Jacinto Monument as a participant and he received a land grant for his participation. The remaining Burleson troops pressed on to San Jacinto without Fisk. In 1838, Fisk served one year as a legislator for the Third Congress Republic of Texas, became district court clerk in Bastrop, and in 1841 was named chief justice (now called county judge) for Bastrop County. Fisk was also elected mayor of Bastrop from 1839-1840.

Other offices and areas of service for Fisk were: first county judge of Williamson and Brown Counties, chief surveyor of the Republic of Texas, district clerk and county surveyor for Bastrop and Brown Counties, Indian negotiator for the Comancheria, Mina Volunteer, Texas Ranger, and Mexican War veteran.

== Brown County ==
Fisk became a large landholder in Brown County, eventually owning over 14,000 acres, including the league that he inherited from his wife, Mary Ann Manlove Fisk. On November 18, 1847, Fisk obtained a grant of 1,240 acres of the Marcus Huling survey, Abstract 405, Patent 150, in Bastrop County. On December 8, 1847, Fisk obtained a grant of 4,605.50 acres of the E.D. Prewitt survey, Abstract 741, Patent 159, in Brown County. On June 7, 1848, Fisk obtained a grant of 1476.13 acres of the John Kellogg survey, Abstract 578, Patent 478, in Brown County. On June 17, 1862, Fisk obtained a grant of 320 acres of the H. Upchurch survey, Abstract 925, Patent 589, in Travis County. On August 21, 1862, Fisk obtained a grant of 949.30 acres of the Taylor Smith survey, Abstract 821, Patent 63, in Brown County. On November 25, 1870, Fisk obtained a grant of 288 acres in the William S. Mitchell survey, Abstract 632, Patent 288, in Brown County. On December 1, 1877, Fisk obtained a grant of 320 acres in the Juan Armendaris survey, Abstract 1004, Patent 253, in Brown County.

In 1860, Fisk and his new family moved to Brown County and constructed a log house east of what is now Brownwood. In time, Fisk constructed a home of native limestone and added a gristmill. That home has now been designated with historic markers, both state and national. Fisk wore many hats, as county judge, justice of the peace, county surveyor, district clerk, county clerk, county treasurer, and teacher at Brownwood school, the county's first. Fisk also gave land and money at his death to help establish Daniel Baker College in Brownwood. His daughter Phoebe was later one of the first female students at the college. This college later merged with the Baptist college of Howard Payne University.

The original site of Brownwood (county seat for Brown County) was on the east of Pecan Bayou. When a dispute arose over land and water rights, settlers were forced to find a new location. Greenleaf Fisk donated 60 acres to relocate the county seat to the west side of the bayou on what is now the current site of Brownwood, and 100 additional acres for county use. The town of Brownwood was incorporated in 1884 and was named for Henry Stevenson Brown, a commander at the Battle of Velasco.

== Personal life and death ==
Between May and July 1835, Fisk married Mary Ann Manlove, daughter of Colonel Bartholomew Manlove (first mayor of Bastrop, Texas) and Avarilla Perkins. Mary Ann was born in Kentucky, probably Bourbon County in 1811. They later moved from Bastrop County to Williamson County in 1848. Mary Ann inherited her father's league and labor in Williamson County, and Greenleaf and she owned around 27,000 acres in what is today Georgetown, Leander, and Liberty Hill, Texas. Mary Ann also owned a league of land in what is today Brown and Coleman Counties. This league was given to her as a replacement for land she lost in Bastrop County over a land dispute, after the Texas Revolution. Both Greenleaf and Mary Ann's children inherited this land after her death. Greenleaf and Mary Ann also gave land and money to what is today Southwestern University in Georgetown. This was to help finance the removal of the failed Methodist college from Reutersville and establish a new college at Georgetown. Later, Greenleaf and Mary Ann's son, James Bartholomew Fisk, married Mary Martha Rachel Euphemia "Feemie" Carothers, daughter of Col. Samuel Carothers of Georgetown. Fisk's sister-in-law, Lizzie Carothers Weiss, saved the university in 1937, when it became destitute, by endowing it with $160,000 at her death. Lizzie, a lifelong Methodist, had graduated from Southwestern. She stipulated that the college be reorganized on a better financial footing, but she literally saved the college from extinction. Mary Ann and Greenleaf had seven children together. Mary Ann died in 1853. Greenleaf Fisk then married Mary Ann's sister, Margaret Jane Manlove (born in 1823) on January 20, 1855, in Williamson County, Texas. Margaret died in 1855 several days following the birth of a child (this baby died about two weeks later). Both Margaret Jane and the baby are also buried in the Fisk-Cashion Cemetery in Williamson County. On May 8, 1857, in Williamson County, Texas, Mary Piper Hawkins became the third wife of Greenleaf Fisk, and they had eight children together. The third Mrs. Fisk died in 1905 and is buried at Greenleaf Cemetery in Brownwood, Texas next to her husband.

Greenleaf Fisk died on January 26, 1888, and is buried at Greenleaf Cemetery in Brownwood, Texas. At his death his family gave land for the establishment of Daniel Baker College. One of Fisk's daughters was one of the first female students there. Later, the Baptist College, Howard Payne College, merged with Daniel Baker College and is today known as Howard Payne University. Its main building is located on Fisk Street in Brownwood. The day of Greenleaf Fisk's funeral at the First Presbyterian Church of Brownwood, the entire town shut down in his honor. Two memorial cenotaphs for Greenleaf Fisk and his first wife Mary Ann Manlove can be found side by side at Texas State Cemetery. Greenleaf's memorial was dedicated by the Fisk family on April 26, 2003, whereas Mary Ann's memorial was dedicated in 2009.
