= Sim Gideon Power Plant =

Power Plant

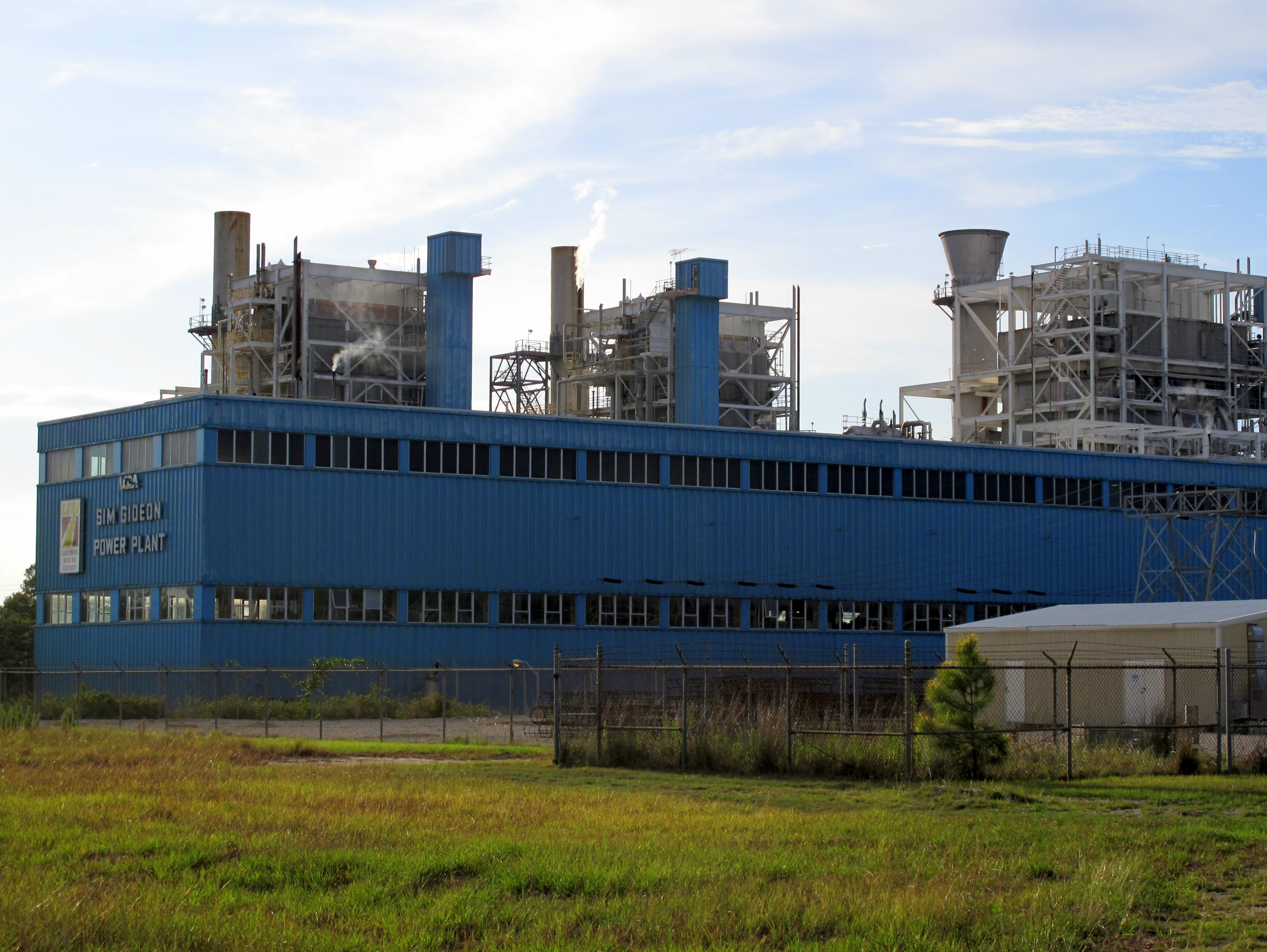
- Country: United States
- Location: Bastrop County, Texas, near Bastrop, Texas
- Coordinates: 30°08′44″N 97°16′13″W
- Status: Operational
- Commission date: Unit 1: 1965; Unit 2: 1968; Unit 3: 1971
- Owner: Lower Colorado River Authority

Thermal power station
- Primary fuel: Natural gas
- Cooling source: Lake Bastrop

Power generation
- Nameplate capacity: 620 MW

The Sim Gideon Power Plant is a 639 megawatt (MW), natural gas fired power plant located near Bastrop, Texas in Bastrop County, Texas. It is owned and operated by the Lower Colorado River Authority. The Sim Gideon Power Plant consists of three generating units that operate via natural gas-fired boilers. The plant, along with Lost Pines Power Project 1, is part of the Lost Pines Power Park.

Three generating units compose the Sim Gideon Power Plant:

- Unit 1, completed in 1965, with a generating capacity of 140 MW
- Unit 2, completed in 1968, with a generating capacity of 140 MW
- Unit 3, completed in 1971, with a generating capacity of 340 MW

Cooling water is provided by Lake Bastrop, a 900-acre (360 ha) freshwater reservoir, and four wells that produce groundwater from the Simsboro Aquifer.

== See also ==
- List of power stations in Texas
