= Carroll Jones House =

Historic house in Michigan, United States

- Carroll and Bessie E. (Caul) Jones House
- U.S. National Register of Historic Places
- Michigan State Historic Site
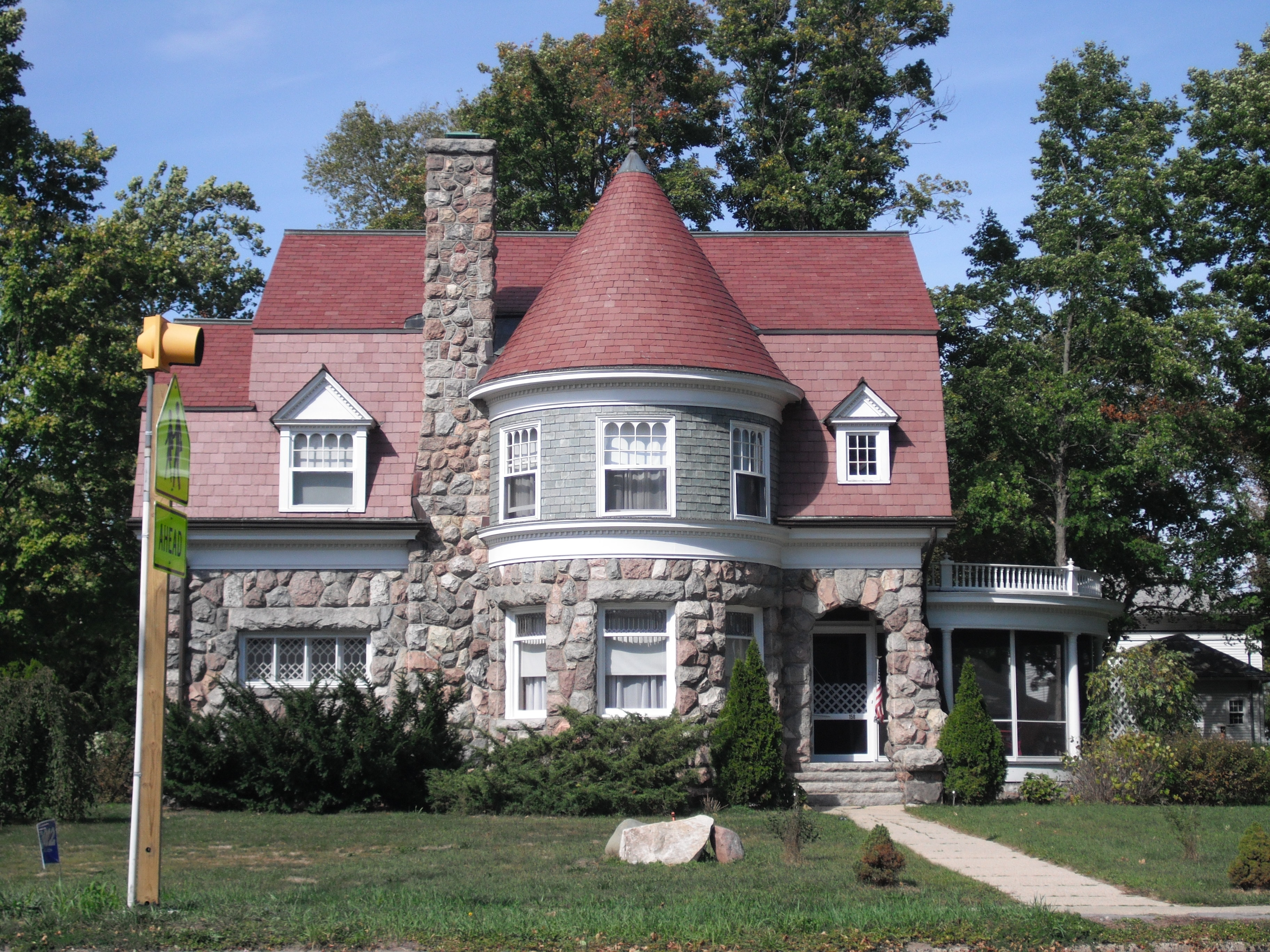

- Location within Michigan Location within the United States
- Interactive map
- Location: 170 W. Main Street, Marcellus, Michigan
- Coordinates: 42°1′38″N 85°49′0″W
- Area: less than one acre
- Built: 1898
- Architect: Alan Clother Varney
- Architectural style: Dutch Colonial Revival, Romanesque Revival
- NRHP reference No.: 97001482

Significant dates
- Added to NRHP: December 1, 1997
- Designated MSHS: January 17, 1986

The Carroll and Bessie E. (Caul) Jones House, also known as Poke's Cottage or The Stone House, is a private house located at 170 West Main Street in Marcellus, Michigan. It was designated a Michigan State Historic Site in 1986 and listed on the National Register of Historic Places in 1997.

== History ==
Carroll Sherman Jones was born in 1857, the son of Marcellus founder George Washington Jones and his wife Emma Brewster (whose nearby house is also on the National Register). He went into his father's banking business, running the G.W. Jones Exchange Bank in Marcellus from its founding. In 1891. Jones married Bessie E. Caul; the couple had two children. The Jones house was constructed for the family between 1898 and 1900 from a design by the Detroit architectural firm of Alan Clother Varney. Carroll Sherman Jones continued to work at the bank until his death in 1921.

== Description ==
The Carroll Jones House is a two-story structure with both Dutch Colonial Revival and Romanesque Revival elements. It has a large gambrel roof clad in red slate with green slate on the gable ends, and a round conical-roof tower in the front facade. The first floor is faced with massive hand-cut fieldstone blocks and contains a round porch with Tuscan columns. The interior is decorated in Arts and Crafts style, with quarter-sawn oak doors, trim, and cabinetry.
