= Lake Bastrop =

Reservoir in Texas, US

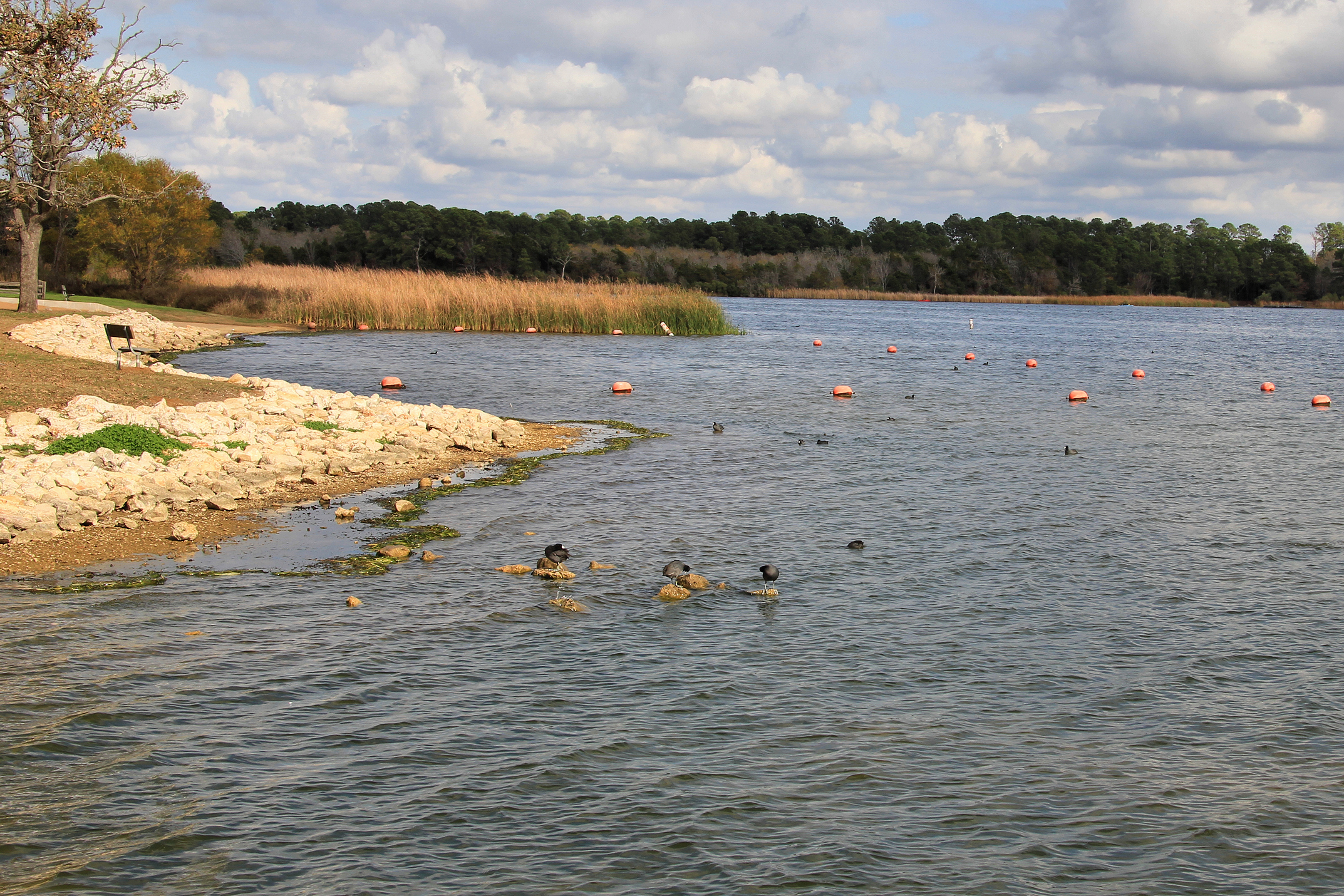
- Lake Bastrop at North Shore Park, December 2014

- Location within Texas
- Location: Bastrop County, Texas, US
- Coordinates: 30°9.31′N 97°17.51′W
- Type: Power plant cooling reservoir
- Primary inflows: Spicer Creek
- Primary outflows: Spicer Creek
- Basin countries: United States
- Surface area: 906 acres (367 ha)
- Max. depth: 60 ft (18 m)
- Water volume: 16,590 acre⋅ft (20,460,000 m^{3})
- Surface elevation: 450 ft (140 m)

Lake Bastrop is a reservoir on Spicer Creek in the Colorado River basin 3 miles (4.8 km) northeast of the town of Bastrop in central Bastrop County, Texas, United States.

== Description ==
The reservoir was formed in 1964 by the construction of a dam by the Lower Colorado River Authority. The lake serves primarily as a power plant cooling pond for the Sim Gideon Power Plant operated by the LCRA and the Lost Pines Power Project 1, owned by GenTex Power Corporation, a wholly owned affiliate of the LCRA. Lake Bastrop also serves as a venue for outdoor recreation and is maintained at a constant level year round.

Approximately one quarter of the shoreline of the Lake is privately owned by the Capitol Area Council, Boy Scouts of America. This property is used for the Lost Pines Scout Reservation, consisting of Cub World at Camp Tom Wooten, for Cub Scouts and Lost Pines Boy Scout Camp, for Boy Scouts. The Scouts leased the property from the LCRA starting in 1965, buying the land in the late 1990s.

== Fish populations ==
Lake Bastrop has been stocked with species of fish intended to improve the utility of the reservoir for recreational fishing. Fish present in Lake Bastrop include largemouth bass, channel catfish, blue catfish, flathead catfish, crappie, perch, sunfish, and carp.

Recreational Fishing Populations
Species	Low	Moderate	High	Extreme
Largemouth Bass				X
Catfish			X	
Crappie		X		
Sunfish		X		

== Parks ==
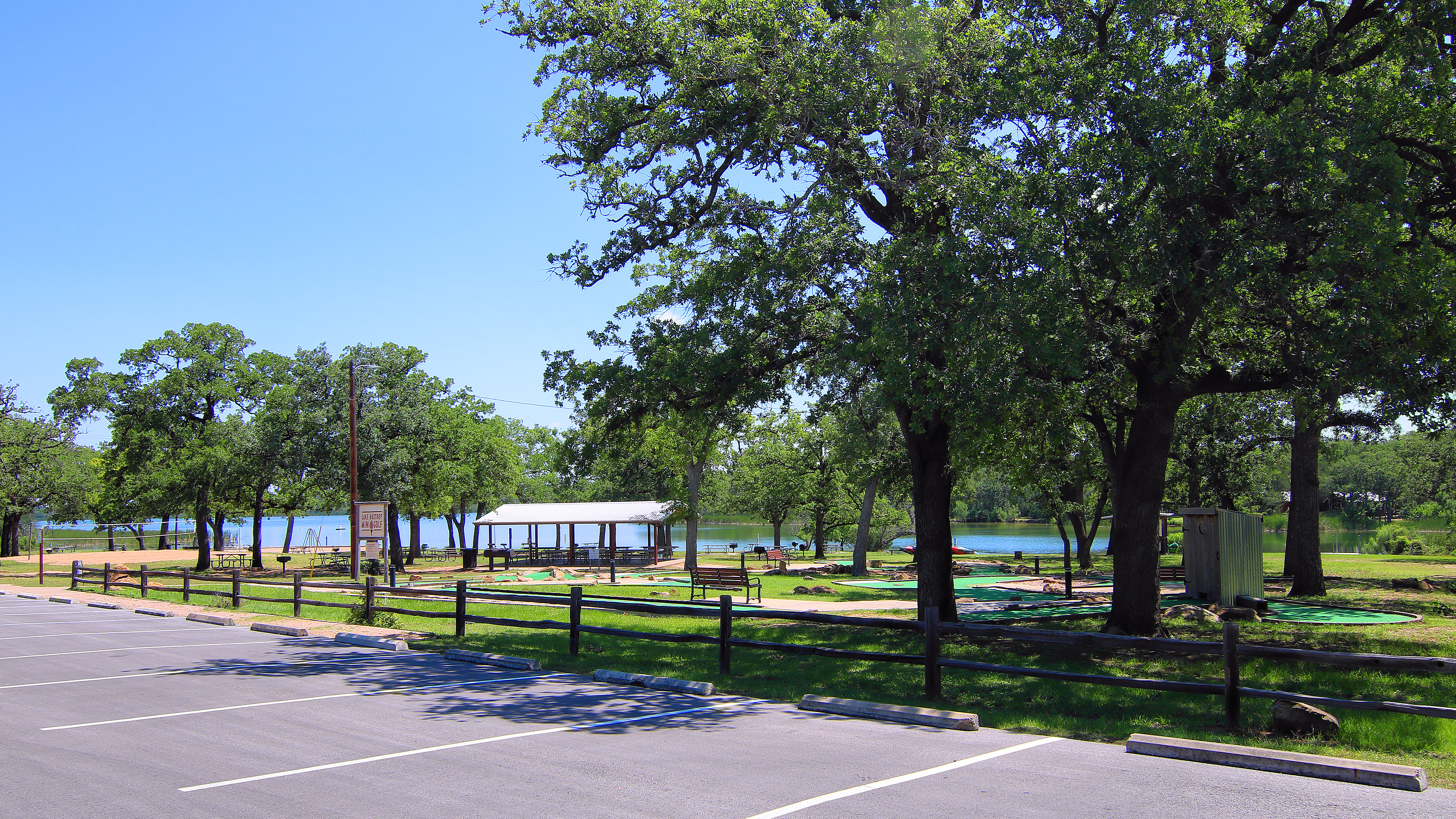
The day use area at Lake Bastrop South Shore Park.

The LCRA owns and operates two parks on Lake Bastrop, the 182-acre (74 ha) Lake Bastrop North Shore Park and the Lake Bastrop South Shore Park. Both parks have camping options. The North Shore offers seven full hookup recreational vehicle (RV) sites and five airstream trailers for rent. They also have cabins and several furnished safari tents they refer to as glamping facilities. The South Shore has twelve full hookup RV sites and twenty-four RV sites with water and electricity. they also have eighteen cabins and two ÖÖD mirror houses.

Both parks offer boating, cycling, canoeing, fishing, hiking, kayaking, picnicking, standup paddleboarding, and swimming. The South Shore has a nine-hole miniature golf course. The North South Trailway is a 4.5-mile hike/bike trail that connects the two parks.

== See also ==
- List of dams and reservoirs in Texas
