= Richard Starcke House (703 Main Street) =

Historic house in Texas, United States

- U.S. National Register of Historic Places
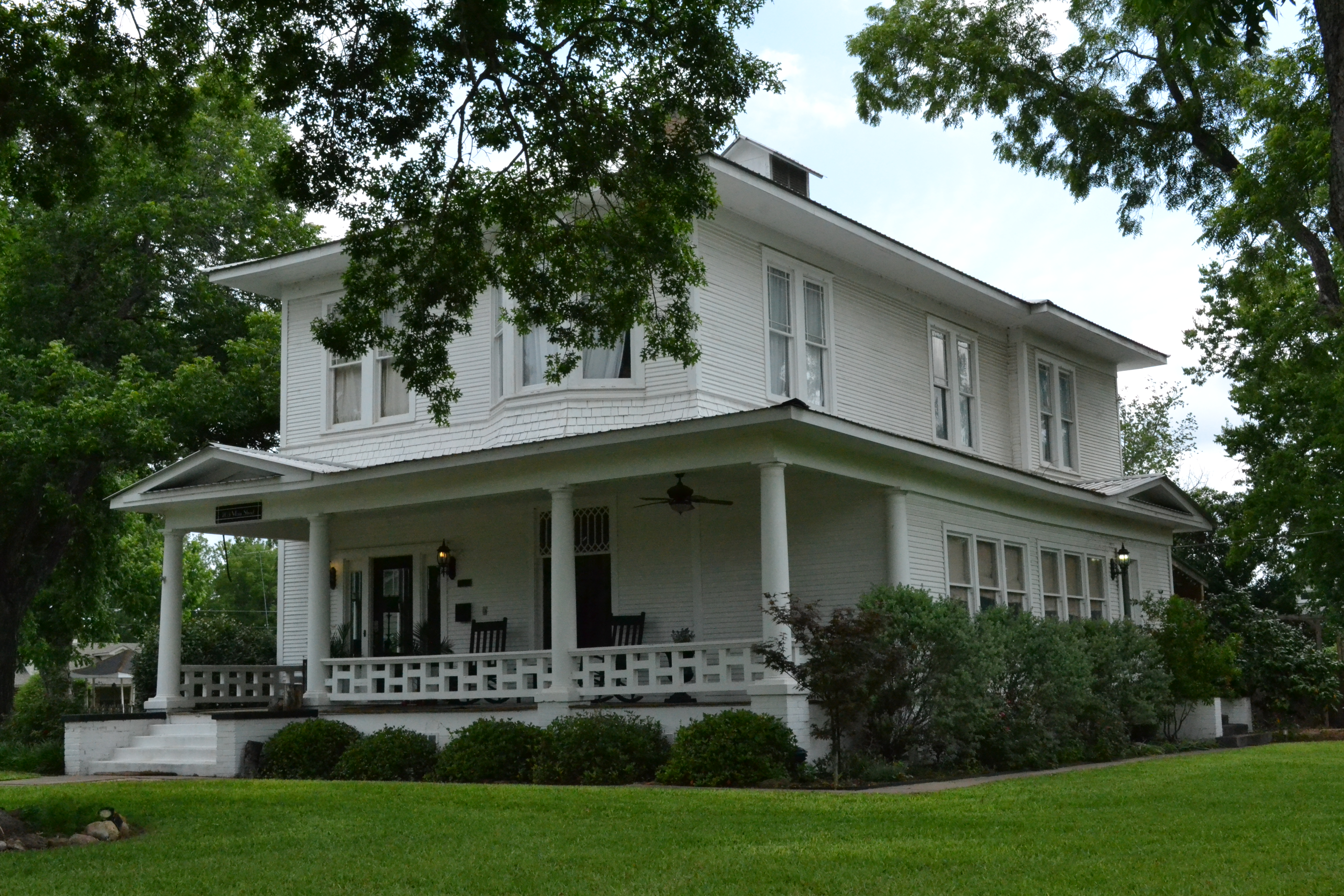
- Richard Starcke House in 2014

- Location within Texas Location within the United States
- Location: 703 Main St., Bastrop, Texas
- Coordinates: 30°6′28″N 97°19′10″W
- Area: less than one acre
- Built: 1913
- Architectural style: Late Victorian
- MPS: Bastrop Historic and Architectural MRA
- NRHP reference No.: 78003328
- Added to NRHP: December 22, 1978

The Richard Starcke House is a historic house located at 703 Main Street, Bastrop, Texas, United States. The house was built in 1913 by Richard Starcke, a prominent Bastrop businessman, for himself and his wife Mary.

The house is a clapboard covered modified American Foursquare design with some Victorian architecture, American Craftsman and Prairie School elements incorporated.

In 1931, Richard died. Mary remained in the home. Upon her death in 1961, the house passed through several owners and, in 1966, into bank foreclosure. The house was purchased at auction by Lt. Col. Johnnie Zinn and Ernestine Moncure Zinn. The house served as the Zinn's home until 1987 and entered the National Register of Historic Places on December 22, 1978.

Carla and Chris Dickson subsequently purchased the house in 1994 and operated "The Colony Bed and Breakfast" until the death of Mrs. Dickson in 2005. Julie Hart and Paula Pate purchased the house in 2007 and reopened it in May, 2008 as the "Magnolia Inn Bed and Breakfast".

== See also ==
- National Register of Historic Places listings in Bastrop County, Texas
