= G. W. Jones House =

Historic house in Michigan, United States

- U.S. National Register of Historic Places
- Michigan State Historic Site
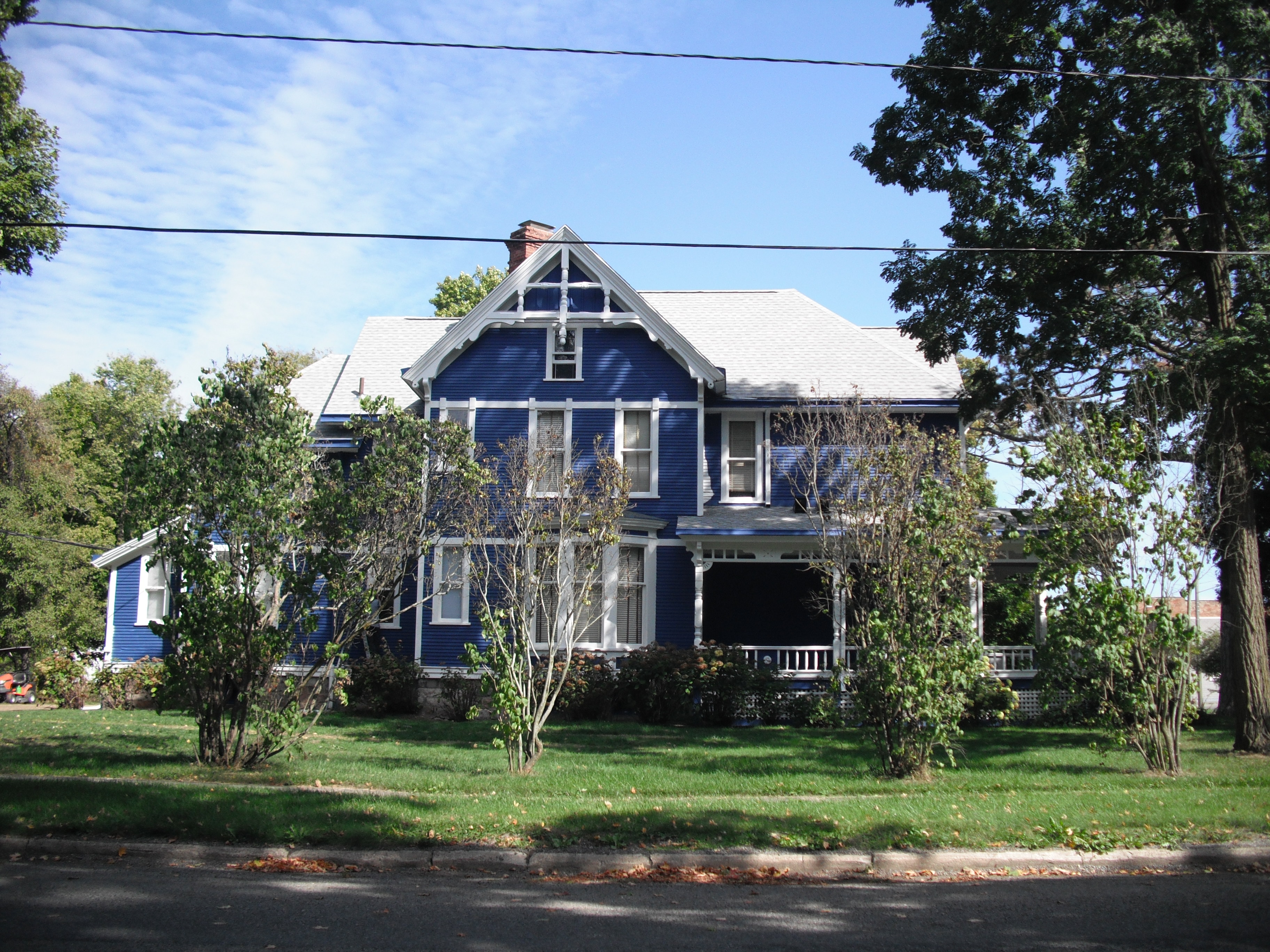
- The house in September 2012

- Location within Michigan Location within the United States
- Interactive map
- Location: 180 W. Main St., Marcellus, Michigan
- Coordinates: 42°1′38″N 85°49′2″W
- Area: 1.3 acres (0.53 ha)
- Built: 1886
- Architectural style: Stick style/Eastlake
- NRHP reference No.: 94001427

Significant dates
- Added to NRHP: December 9, 1994
- Designated MSHS: January 17, 1986

The George Washington Jones House is a private house located at 180 West Main Street in Marcellus, Michigan. It was designated a Michigan State Historic Site in 1986 and listed on the National Register of Historic Places in 1994.

== History ==
George Washington Jones was born in 1824 in Preble County, Ohio, the son of Henry and Hannah Jones. The family moved to Michigan in 1830, where the younger Jones helped his father on the farm. In 1851, this father died and Jones was named executor of the debt-laden estate. In 1853, he married Emma S. Sherman; the couple had two sons: Frank S. Jones and Carroll S. Jones (whose nearby house is also on the National Register). Through hard work and a shrewd business sense, Jones eventually accumulated some wealth and paid off all debts by 1862.

In 1870, as the railroad was being built, Jones recognized that the present site of Marcellus would be an attractive place for a village, and purchased the land and platted it out. That same year, his wife Emma died. In 1876, Jones married Lizzie Osborn. In 1877, he opened the G.W. Jones Exchange Bank in Marcellus, which was eventually run by his sons, and continues to be run by his descendants.

In 1888, Jones built this house for himself and his wife. The lived there until his death in 1896. It was vacant for a span of time in the 1980s and 1990s.

== Description ==
The G.W. Jones is a two-story rectangular balloon-frame house with a full-height attic built in the Stick/Eastlake style. The house is still substantially intact.
