= Fatburger =

American restaurant chain

Fatburger North America Inc.

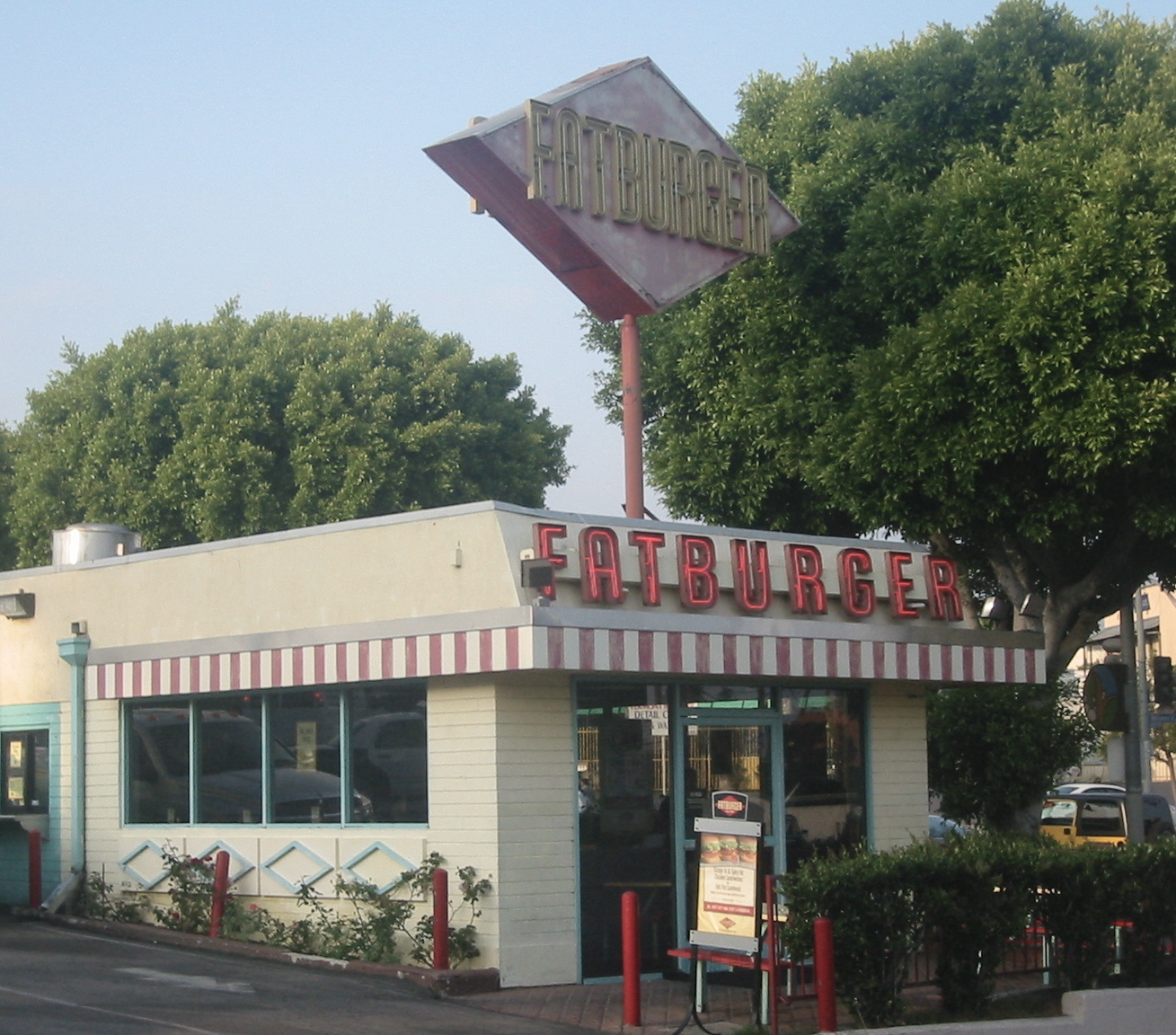
- Fatburger restaurant in Los Feliz, Los Angeles
- Trade name: Fatburger
- Type: Subsidiary
- Industry: Fast casual restaurant
- Founded: 1947; 79 years ago Los Angeles, California, U.S.
- Founder: Lovie Yancey
- Headquarters: Beverly Hills, California, U.S.
- Number of locations: 182 (2021)
- Area served: Worldwide
- Key people: Ken Kuick (Co-CEO); Rob Rosen (Co-CEO); Thayer D. Wiederhorn (COO)
- Products: Burgers, french fries, soft drinks, milkshakes
- Number of employees: >4,000 (2017)
- Parent: FBG Bid Co.
- Website: fatburger.com

Fatburger North America Inc. (doing business as Fatburger) is an American fast casual restaurant chain owned by FBG Bid Co. Its tagline is The Last Great Hamburger Stand. While it is a fast-food restaurant, the food is cooked and made to order. Some Fatburger restaurants have liquor licenses as well as "fat bars". Its franchise headquarters are located in Beverly Hills, California. In addition to the United States, the chain operates in 19 other countries. The Fatburger menu is centered primarily on hamburgers, offering various sizes and numbers of patties, along with add-ons such as cheese, bacon and eggs.

== History ==
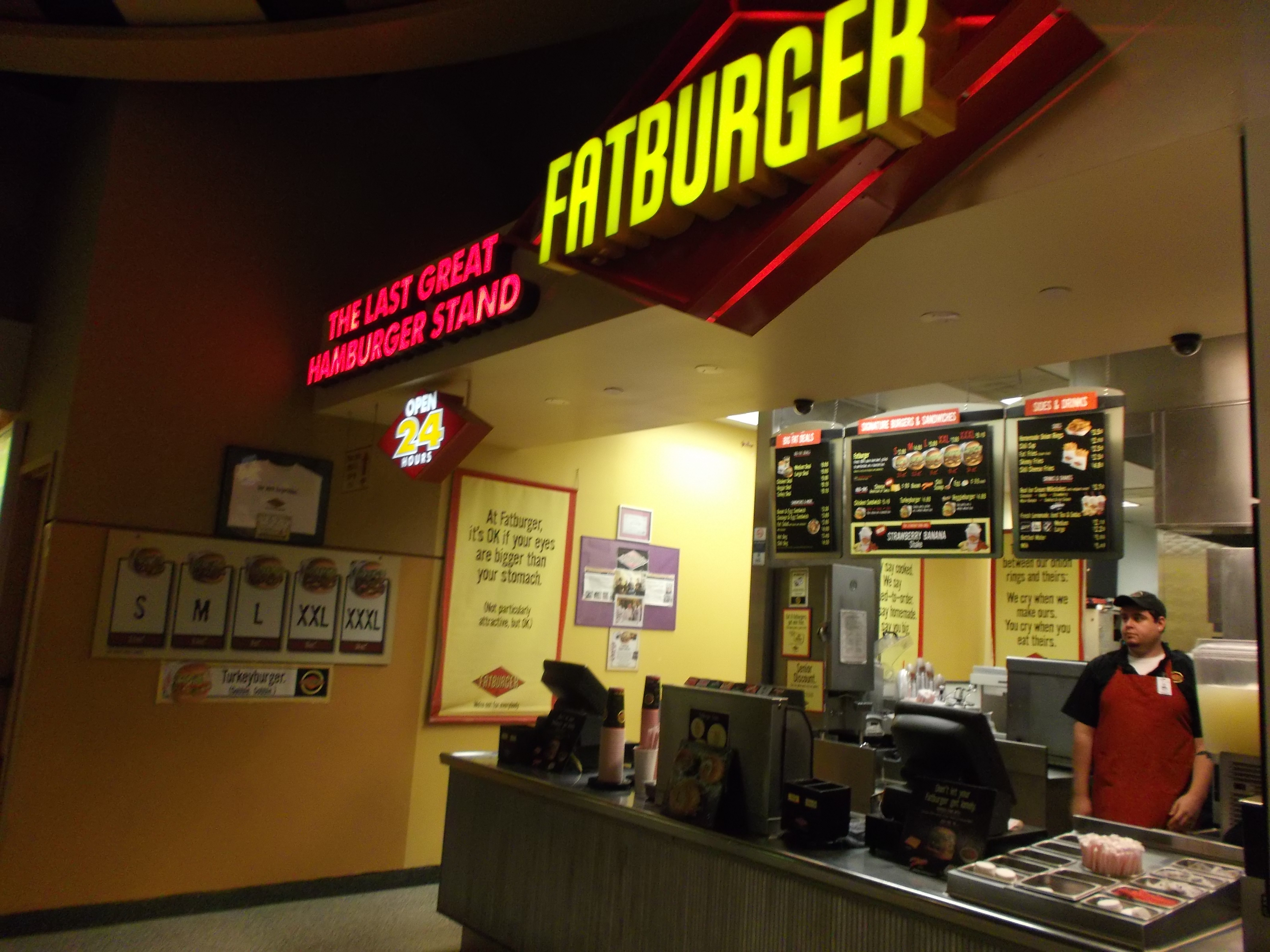
Fatburger in the food court of Morongo Casino, Resort & Spa, Cabazon, California

Fatburger was founded by Lovie Yancey (1912–2008) in the neighborhood of Exposition Park in Los Angeles, California, in 1947. It was originally named "Mr. Fatburger" (on behalf of Yancey's boyfriend), until Yancey removed the "Mr." in 1952. At that time, she bought out her start-up partners and retained sole ownership of the Fatburger brand until 1990, keeping and operating the original store on Western Avenue along with the La Cienega Boulevard store (La Cienega/San Vicente).

Fatburger remained a mostly California-based chain until the late 1990s, when it began an expansion in North America. On August 15, 2003, Fog Cutter Capital Group completed a $7 million investment and financing package for the company. Fatburger operates or franchises over 150 Fatburger restaurants worldwide with over 300 more planned for future development. For several months in 2006, the company was barred from selling additional franchises in California, due to chairperson Wiederhorn's felony convictions.

In 2008, Fatburger opened its first restaurant in a sports stadium, the Arizona Diamondbacks' Chase Field. Fatburger also opened its first location in Dubai, U.A.E., (today there are eight). There are also Fatburger eateries in Beijing, PR China.

In January 2013, Fatburger opened its first branch in Karachi, Pakistan. Owing to the success of the burgers and positive response in Pakistan, Fatburger opened its biggest flagship outlet globally in June 2013 in Lahore. In July 2015, a branch in Lahore was shut down by authorities due to health and food safety reasons. Despite the shutdown, in August of the same year, Fatburger opened its fourth branch in Z Block, DHA, Lahore. In 2019, Crescent Star Foods, a subsidiary of Crescent Star Insurance Limited, announced a partnership with FAT Brands to open five co-branded Fatburger, and Buffalo's Express establishments in Pakistan. Fatburger continued operating in Pakistan, but dwindled its presence in the country before exiting it in the early 2020s.

On January 26, 2026, parent company FAT Brands filed for Chapter 11 bankruptcy protection in an effort to shed billions of dollars in debt. The company listed assets and liabilities between $1 billion and $10 billion. After receiving court approval for the sale of its assets, FBG Bid Co. officially acquired the remaining assets from FAT Brands for $595 million on June 18, 2026, including Fatburger.

== Locations ==
Fatburger has locations in five western states in the United States and Canada, and new locations in China, Saudi Arabia, Bahrain, Malaysia, the United Kingdom, Fiji, Indonesia, Iraq (including Iraqi Kurdistan), India, the United Arab Emirates, Kuwait, Tunisia, Macau, Oman, Panama, Singapore, Philippines, Qatar, and Japan. In some locations, menu changes were made to conform to local customs. It will expand into Texas, in cities like Austin, Dallas, Houston and San Antonio. In 2019, it was announced the first Texas location would be created in North Richland Hills.

== Partnerships ==
Former professional basketball player Magic Johnson, through Johnson Development Corporation, was one of the owners of the parent company. Former talk show host Montel Williams co-owns several Fatburger restaurants in Colorado. Bay Area musician E-40 also had a stake in the company as a franchise owner, by opening the first San Francisco Bay Area Fatburger restaurant in Pleasant Hill, which is now closed. Actor and musician Queen Latifah also at one point partnered with Fatburger.

In 2007, rapper Kanye West's restaurant company, KW Foods LLC, struck a deal to open up to 10 Fatburger restaurants in Chicago. Ultimately, in 2009, only two locations actually opened. In February 2011, West shut down the Fatburger located in Orland Park. R&B musician Pharrell, in partnership with Fatburger, opened several Fatburger restaurants in China in 2007 and 2008.

== In popular culture ==
Fatburger has been featured and/or seen in TV series and movies:

- Sanford and Son frequently mentioned Fatburger in conversation.
- In 1992, Fatburger gained national attention after being referenced in the hit song "It Was a Good Day" by rapper and actor Ice Cube. It was also referenced by The Notorious B.I.G. in the 1997 song "Going Back to Cali".
- In the 2001 film Rat Race, the Pear family were sitting inside a Fatburger. Later, Randy Pear buys sleeping pills and puts them in his family's milkshakes.
- In the 2016 film Get a Job, Hank Diller is at his desk with food from Fatburger.
- On season 1 episode entitled "Tickets for a Queue" of the Apple TV+ series Trying, Jason and Erica are having a meal at Fatburger.

== See also ==
- List of hamburger restaurants
