= National Register of Historic Places listings in Bastrop County, Texas =

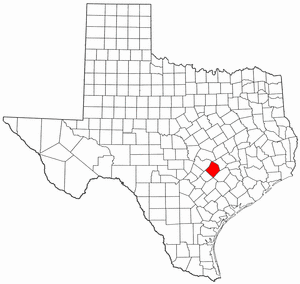
Location of Bastrop County in Texas

This is a list of the National Register of Historic Places listings in Bastrop County, Texas.

This is intended to be a complete list of properties and districts listed on the National Register of Historic Places in Bastrop County, Texas. There are five districts, including one National Historic Landmark district, and 96 individual properties listed on the National Register in the county. An additional site was formerly listed. One individually listed property is a State Antiquities Landmark and contains two Recorded Texas Historic Landmarks. Twenty-three other properties and numerous sites within three districts are also Recorded Texas Historic Landmarks.

This National Park Service list is complete through NPS recent listings posted August 21, 2026.

== Current listings ==
The locations of National Register properties and districts may be seen in a mapping service provided.

| | Name on the Register | Image | Date listed | Location | City or town | Description |
|---|---|---|---|---|---|---|
| 1 | Allen-Bell House | Allen-Bell House | January 25, 1971 (#71000919) | 1408 Church St. 30°06′57″N 97°19′18″W | Bastrop | Recorded Texas Historic Landmark |
| 2 | August Baron House | August Baron House | December 22, 1978 (#78003277) | 1707 Pecan St. 30°07′07″N 97°19′03″W | Bastrop | |
| 3 | Ed Bastain-Haralson House | Ed Bastain-Haralson House | December 22, 1978 (#78003350) | 1006 Chestnut St. 30°06′39″N 97°18′57″W | Bastrop | Recorded Texas Historic Landmark |
| 4 | Bastrop Commercial District | Bastrop Commercial District | December 22, 1978 (#78003262) | Roughly bounded by Church, Water, Spring, and Walnut Sts. 30°06′38″N 97°19′12″W | Bastrop | Includes Recorded Texas Historic Landmarks; 32 buildings |
| 5 | Bastrop County Courthouse and Jail Complex | Bastrop County Courthouse and Jail Complex | November 20, 1975 (#75001947) | Bounded by Pine, Walnut, Pecan, and Water Sts. 30°06′33″N 97°19′05″W | Bastrop | State Antiquities Landmark, includes Recorded Texas Historic Landmarks |
| 6 | Bastrop State Park | Bastrop State Park | September 25, 1997 (#97001242) | East of downtown Bastrop, bet. TX 21 & 71; 30°06′31″N 97°16′55″W | Bastrop | |
| 7 | Judge R. Batts House | Judge R. Batts House | December 22, 1978 (#78003336) | 609 Pecan St. 30°06′26″N 97°19′02″W | Bastrop | Church now stands at the site |
| 8 | S. L. Brannon House | S. L. Brannon House | December 22, 1978 (#78003264) | 1301 Main St. 30°06′50″N 97°19′11″W | Bastrop | |
| 9 | R. J. Brieger House | R. J. Brieger House | December 22, 1978 (#78003278) | 1508 Hill St. 30°07′00″N 97°18′55″W | Bastrop | Recorded Texas Historic Landmark |
| 10 | Jennie Brooks House | Jennie Brooks House | December 22, 1978 (#78003317) | 1009 Walnut St. 30°06′30″N 97°18′55″W | Bastrop | |
| 11 | Brooks-Wilbarger House | Brooks-Wilbarger House | December 22, 1978 (#78003269) | 1403 Main St. 30°06′55″N 97°19′12″W | Bastrop | Recorded Texas Historic Landmark |
| 12 | J. C. Buchanan House | J. C. Buchanan House | December 22, 1978 (#78003326) | 1010 Pecan St. 30°06′41″N 97°19′04″W | Bastrop | |
| 13 | Mary Christian Burleson House | Mary Christian Burleson House | January 30, 2024 (#100009778) | 117 Louise Street; 30°21′33″N 97°22′07″W | Elgin | |
| 14 | Casino Hall | Casino Hall | December 22, 1978 (#78003291) | NE corner of Farm and Fayette; 30°06′47″N 97°18′45″W | Bastrop | |
| 15 | Colorado River Bridge at Bastrop | Colorado River Bridge at Bastrop | July 19, 1990 (#90001031) | State Loop 150 over the Colorado River; 30°06′36″N 97°19′21″W | Bastrop | |
| 16 | H. B. Combs House | H. B. Combs House | December 22, 1978 (#78003294) | 1208 Church St. 30°06′49″N 97°19′18″W | Bastrop | |
| 17 | John Cornelson House | John Cornelson House | December 22, 1978 (#78003301) | 702 Main St. 30°06′26″N 97°19′11″W | Bastrop | Recorded Texas Historic Landmark; now the Bastrop County Historical Society Museum |
| 18 | Crocheron-McDowall House | Crocheron-McDowall House | April 20, 1978 (#78003357) | 1502 Wilson St. 30°06′58″N 97°19′22″W | Bastrop | Recorded Texas Historic Landmark |
| 19 | J. T. Crysup House | J. T. Crysup House | December 22, 1978 (#78003274) | 1607 Main St. 30°07′03″N 97°19′11″W | Bastrop | |
| 20 | George W. Davis House | George W. Davis House | December 22, 1978 (#78003343) | 1010 Chestnut St. 30°06′39″N 97°18′55″W | Bastrop | |
| 21 | Dawson House | Dawson House | December 22, 1978 (#78003351) | 1002 Chestnut St. 30°06′39″N 97°18′58″W | Bastrop | |
| 22 | Mary Duval House | Mary Duval House | December 22, 1978 (#78003268) | 1502 Pecan St. 30°06′58″N 97°19′04″W | Bastrop | |
| 23 | Elgin Commercial Historic District | Elgin Commercial Historic District | February 16, 1996 (#96000024) | Roughly, along Main St., Ave. C, Central and Depot Aves. and 1st and 2nd Sts. 30°20′52″N 97°22′14″W | Elgin | Includes Recorded Texas Historic Landmark |
| 24 | Elzner House | Elzner House | December 22, 1978 (#78003302) | 800 Main St. 30°06′31″N 97°19′12″W | Bastrop | Recorded Texas Historic Landmark |
| 25 | August Elzner House | August Elzner House | December 22, 1978 (#78003273) | 1701 Main St. 30°07′05″N 97°19′11″W | Bastrop | |
| 26 | Prince Elzner House | Prince Elzner House | December 22, 1978 (#78003283) | 1303 Pecan St. 30°06′51″N 97°19′02″W | Bastrop | |
| 27 | Erhard House | Erhard House | December 22, 1978 (#78003280) | 907 Cedar St. 30°07′02″N 97°19′03″W | Bastrop | |
| 28 | A. A. Erhard House | A. A. Erhard House | December 22, 1978 (#78003329) | 1106 Pecan St. 30°06′44″N 97°19′04″W | Bastrop | |
| 29 | Adolph A. Erhard House | Adolph A. Erhard House | December 22, 1978 (#78003284) | 1205 Pecan St. 30°06′48″N 97°19′02″W | Bastrop | Recorded Texas Historic Landmark |
| 30 | E. C. Erhard House | E. C. Erhard House | December 22, 1978 (#78003279) | 1507 Pecan St. 30°07′00″N 97°19′02″W | Bastrop | |
| 31 | Farm House | | December 22, 1978 (#78003334) | End of Pecan St. 30°06′03″N 97°18′56″W | Bastrop | Location uncertain |
| 32 | Fowler House | Fowler House | December 22, 1978 (#78003321) | 1404 Wilson St. 30°06′55″N 97°19′22″W | Bastrop | Recorded Texas Historic Landmark |
| 33 | Fowler-Jenkins House | Fowler-Jenkins House | December 22, 1978 (#78003263) | 1302 Pecan St. 30°06′50″N 97°19′04″W | Bastrop | Recorded Texas Historic Landmark |
| 34 | P. A. Fry House | | December 22, 1978 (#78003337) | 1403 Emile St. 30°06′22″N 97°18′38″W | Bastrop | Moved from original location to current location across from Emilie School; Location uncertain |
| 35 | Rufus A. Green House | Rufus A. Green House | December 22, 1978 (#78003347) | 1501 Church St. 30°06′58″N 97°19′16″W | Bastrop | |
| 36 | Griesenbeck House | Griesenbeck House | December 22, 1978 (#78003349) | 805 Pecan St. 30°06′33″N 97°19′02″W | Bastrop | |
| 37 | Alf Griesenbeck House | Alf Griesenbeck House | December 22, 1978 (#78003282) | 1302 Hill St. 30°06′51″N 97°18′56″W | Bastrop | |
| 38 | Erna Griesenbeck House | Erna Griesenbeck House | December 22, 1978 (#78003338) | 908 Pine St. 30°06′35″N 97°19′00″W | Bastrop | |
| 39 | R. J. Griesenbeck House | R. J. Griesenbeck House | December 22, 1978 (#78003308) | 1005 Chestnut St. 30°06′37″N 97°18′57″W | Bastrop | |
| 40 | Dr. C. A. Grimes House | Dr. C. A. Grimes House | December 22, 1978 (#78003355) | 1201 Farm St. 30°06′45″N 97°18′49″W | Bastrop | |
| 41 | Hall-Sayers-Perkins House | Hall-Sayers-Perkins House | December 22, 1978 (#78003293) | 1307 Church St. 30°06′52″N 97°19′16″W | Bastrop | Recorded Texas Historic Landmark |
| 42 | Eugene Harlson House | Eugene Harlson House | December 22, 1978 (#78003344) | 803 Jefferson St. 30°06′32″N 97°18′58″W | Bastrop | |
| 43 | Emelia Hasler House | Emelia Hasler House | December 22, 1978 (#78003307) | 1004 Pine St. 30°06′35″N 97°18′57″W | Bastrop | |
| 44 | T. A. Hasler House | T. A. Hasler House | December 22, 1978 (#78003330) | 1109 Pecan; 30°06′45″N 97°19′02″W | Bastrop | |
| 45 | Abraham Wiley Hill House | Abraham Wiley Hill House | March 11, 1971 (#71000920) | 5 mi (8.0 km). SW of Hills Prairie; 30°02′53″N 97°18′28″W | Hills Prairie | Recorded Texas Historic Landmark |
| 46 | Hopewell School | Hopewell School | June 8, 2015 (#15000334) | 690 TX 21 W 30°05′55″N 97°27′41″W | Cedar Creek | |
| 47 | House at 1002 Pine | House at 1002 Pine | December 22, 1978 (#78003304) | 1002 Pine St. 30°06′35″N 97°18′58″W | Bastrop | |
| 48 | House at 1002 Walnut | House at 1002 Walnut | December 22, 1978 (#78003303) | 1002 Walnut St. 30°06′31″N 97°18′58″W | Bastrop | |
| 49 | House at 1105 Hill | House at 1105 Hill | December 22, 1978 (#78003312) | 1105 Hill St. 30°06′45″N 97°18′54″W | Bastrop | |
| 50 | House at 1108 Hill | House at 1108 Hill | December 22, 1978 (#78003306) | 1108 Hill St. 30°06′45″N 97°18′55″W | Bastrop | |
| 51 | House at 1301 Hill | House at 1301 Hill | December 22, 1978 (#78003286) | 1301 Hill St. 30°06′51″N 97°18′53″W | Bastrop | |
| 52 | House at 1308 Fayette | House at 1308 Fayette | December 22, 1978 (#78003285) | 1308 Fayette St. 30°06′53″N 97°18′45″W | Bastrop | |
| 53 | House at 1316 Farm | House at 1316 Farm | December 22, 1978 (#78003290) | 1316 Farm St. 30°06′47″N 97°18′44″W | Bastrop | |
| 54 | House at 311 Pecan | House at 311 Pecan | December 22, 1978 (#78003327) | 311 Pecan St. 30°06′14″N 97°19′02″W | Bastrop | |
| 55 | House at 604 Elm | House at 604 Elm | December 22, 1978 (#78003310) | 604 Elm St. 30°07′09″N 97°19′16″W | Bastrop | |
| 56 | House at 806 Jefferson | House at 806 Jefferson | December 22, 1978 (#78003342) | 806 Jefferson St. 30°06′32″N 97°18′59″W | Bastrop | Recorded Texas Historic Landmark |
| 57 | Houses at 703 and 704 Austin | Houses at 703 and 704 Austin | December 22, 1978 (#78003316) | 703 and 704 Austin; 30°06′27″N 97°19′09″W | Bastrop | |
| 58 | Hubbard-Trigg House | Hubbard-Trigg House | December 22, 1978 (#78003266) | 1508 Pecan St. 30°07′00″N 97°19′04″W | Bastrop | Recorded Texas Historic Landmark |
| 59 | Iron Bridge | Iron Bridge | December 22, 1978 (#78003292) | Over Piney Creek on Main St. 30°07′53″N 97°19′16″W | Bastrop | |
| 60 | Jenkins House | Jenkins House | December 22, 1978 (#78003345) | 801 Pecan St. 30°06′31″N 97°19′02″W | Bastrop | Recorded Texas Historic Landmark |
| 61 | Jenkins House | Jenkins House | December 22, 1978 (#78003299) | 1710 Main St. 30°07′08″N 97°19′14″W | Bastrop | Recorded Texas Historic Landmark |
| 62 | George Washington Jones House | | December 22, 1978 (#78003335) | Martin Luther King Jr. Dr. and Mill St. (formerly Fayette St. and Mill St.); 30°06′08″N 97°18′41″W | Bastrop | Location uncertain |
| 63 | Oliver P. Jones House | Oliver P. Jones House | December 22, 1978 (#78003331) | 1009 Pecan St. 30°06′41″N 97°19′02″W | Bastrop | |
| 64 | Jung Storage Building | Jung Storage Building | December 22, 1978 (#78003323) | 801 Emilie (corner of Emilie and Water); 30°06′23″N 97°19′07″W | Bastrop | |
| 65 | Alf Jung House | Alf Jung House | December 22, 1978 (#78003322) | 508 Pecan St. 30°06′22″N 97°19′04″W | Bastrop | |
| 66 | Joe Jung House | Joe Jung House | December 22, 1978 (#78003333) | 909 Pecan St. 30°06′38″N 97°19′02″W | Bastrop | Recorded Texas Historic Landmark |
| 67 | Kerr Community Center | Kerr Community Center | December 22, 1978 (#78003339) | 1308 Walnut; 30°06′31″N 97°18′43″W | Bastrop | |
| 68 | Beverly and Lula Kerr House | Beverly and Lula Kerr House | December 22, 1978 (#78003356) | 1305 Pine St. 30°06′34″N 97°18′43″W | Bastrop | |
| 69 | Kleinert House | | December 22, 1978 (#78003288) | 1801 Hill St. 30°07′09″N 97°18′55″W | Bastrop | Location uncertain |
| 70 | Kohler-McPhaul House | | December 22, 1978 (#78003275) | 1901 Pecan St. 30°07′17″N 97°19′03″W | Bastrop | House missing. Church located at corner of Pecan and Hawthorne is 1903 Pecan. |
| 71 | Lower Elgin Road Bridge at Wilbarger Creek | Lower Elgin Road Bridge at Wilbarger Creek | April 10, 2017 (#100000860) | County Road 55 at Wilbarger Creek; 30°13′21″N 97°24′34″W | Utley vicinity | |
| 72 | H. P. Luckett House | H. P. Luckett House | December 22, 1978 (#78003296) | 1402 Church St. 30°06′54″N 97°19′18″W | Bastrop | Recorded Texas Historic Landmark |
| 73 | Bartholomew Manlove House | Bartholomew Manlove House | December 22, 1978 (#78003311) | 502 Elm St. 30°07′09″N 97°19′20″W | Bastrop | Recorded Texas Historic Landmark |
| 74 | Powell C. Maynard House | Powell C. Maynard House | December 22, 1978 (#78003267) | 1408 Pecan St. 30°06′56″N 97°19′04″W | Bastrop | |
| 75 | W. E. Maynard House | W. E. Maynard House | December 22, 1978 (#78003281) | 1310 Hill St. 30°06′54″N 97°18′55″W | Bastrop | |
| 76 | Harriet and Charlie McNeil House | | December 22, 1978 (#78003276) | 1805 Pecan St. 30°07′08″N 97°19′03″W | Bastrop | Location uncertain |
| 77 | Marcellus McNeil House | Marcellus McNeil House | December 22, 1978 (#78003298) | 1809 Wilson St. 30°07′14″N 97°19′21″W | Bastrop | Demolished and replaced with new house |
| 78 | Willis Miley House | Willis Miley House | December 22, 1978 (#78003289) | 1320 Farm St. 30°06′47″N 97°18′37″W | Bastrop | |
| 79 | MKT Depot | | December 22, 1978 (#78003354) | NW Chestnut and Fayette; 30°06′40″N 97°18′46″W | Bastrop | Demolished or moved |
| 80 | Old Bastrop Co. Pavilion | Old Bastrop Co. Pavilion | December 22, 1978 (#78003287) | 1800 block of Hawthorne; 30°07′16″N 97°18′47″W | Bastrop | |
| 81 | L. W. Olive House | L. W. Olive House | December 22, 1978 (#78003270) | 1507 Main St. 30°07′00″N 97°19′11″W | Bastrop | |
| 82 | Elbert S. Orgain House | Elbert S. Orgain House | December 22, 1978 (#78003300) | 1704 Main St. 30°07′06″N 97°19′14″W | Bastrop | |
| 83 | Sarah Jane Orgain House | Sarah Jane Orgain House | December 22, 1978 (#78003309) | 602 Cedar St. 30°07′00″N 97°19′16″W | Bastrop | |
| 84 | Paul D. Page House | Paul D. Page House | December 22, 1978 (#78003272) | 1702 Pecan St. 30°07′05″N 97°19′05″W | Bastrop | |
| 85 | J. H. Pearcy House | J. H. Pearcy House | December 22, 1978 (#78003271) | 1602 Pecan St. 30°07′02″N 97°19′05″W | Bastrop | |
| 86 | Phieffer House | Phieffer House | December 22, 1978 (#78003314) | 1802 Main St. 30°07′09″N 97°19′14″W | Bastrop | Recorded Texas Historic Landmark |
| 87 | J. W. Pledger House | J. W. Pledger House | December 22, 1978 (#78003318) | 1704 Wilson St. 30°07′06″N 97°19′22″W | Bastrop | |
| 88 | Ploeger-Kerr-White House | Ploeger-Kerr-White House | December 22, 1978 (#78003346) | 806 Martin Luther King Jr. Dr (formerly Marion St.); 30°06′33″N 97°18′41″W | Bastrop | |
| 89 | Rabensburg House | Rabensburg House | December 22, 1978 (#78003348) | 707 Pecan St. 30°06′30″N 97°19′02″W | Bastrop | |
| 90 | Mrs. William R. Reding House | Mrs. William R. Reding House | December 22, 1978 (#78003340) | 901 Pecan St. 30°06′35″N 97°19′02″W | Bastrop | |
| 91 | Gov. Joseph Sayers House | Gov. Joseph Sayers House | December 22, 1978 (#78003297) | 1703 Wilson St. 30°07′04″N 97°19′20″W | Bastrop | Recorded Texas Historic Landmark |
| 92 | W. F. Schaeffer House | W. F. Schaeffer House | December 22, 1978 (#78003324) | 608 Pecan St. 30°06′26″N 97°19′04″W | Bastrop | |
| 93 | Smithville Commercial Historic District | Smithville Commercial Historic District | June 17, 1982 (#82004489) | 2nd, 3rd, and Main Sts. 30°00′28″N 97°09′35″W | Smithville | 36 buildings |
| 94 | Smithville Residential Historic District | Smithville Residential Historic District | November 29, 1995 (#95001395) | Roughly bounded by Cleveland, First, Mills, N. 9th, Burleson, Colorado, and the Colorado R. 30°00′33″N 97°09′23″W | Smithville | Includes Recorded Texas Historic Landmarks; 191 buildings |
| 95 | Richard Starcke House | Richard Starcke House | December 22, 1978 (#78003315) | 710 Water St. 30°06′30″N 97°19′08″W | Bastrop | |
| 96 | Richard Starcke House | Richard Starcke House | December 22, 1978 (#78003328) | 703 Main St. 30°06′28″N 97°19′10″W | Bastrop | |
| 97 | Campbell Taylor and Greenleaf Fisk House | Campbell Taylor and Greenleaf Fisk House | December 22, 1978 (#78003353) | 1005 Hill St. 30°06′41″N 97°18′54″W | Bastrop | Recorded Texas Historic Landmark |
| 98 | Waugh House | Waugh House | December 22, 1978 (#78003313) | 1801 Main St. 30°07′09″N 97°19′12″W | Bastrop | |
| 99 | White House | White House | December 22, 1978 (#78003265) | 1307 Main St. 30°06′52″N 97°19′11″W | Bastrop | Recorded Texas Historic Landmark |
| 100 | Wilke House | Wilke House | December 22, 1978 (#78003341) | 807 Pecan St. 30°06′33″N 97°19′02″W | Bastrop | |
| 101 | Minnie Wilkes House | Minnie Wilkes House | December 22, 1978 (#78003352) | 1101 Hill St. 30°06′43″N 97°18′53″W | Bastrop | |

== Former listing ==
| | Name on the Register | Image | Date listed | Date removed | Location | City or town | Description |
|---|---|---|---|---|---|---|---|
| 1 | Jacob C. Higgins House | | December 22, 1978 (#78003295) | September 28, 1987 | 1204 Church | Bastrop | Destroyed by fire in 1987. |

== See also ==
- List of National Historic Landmarks in Texas
- National Register of Historic Places listings in Texas
- Recorded Texas Historic Landmarks in Bastrop County
