= Bastrop, Texas =

City in Texas, United States

- City
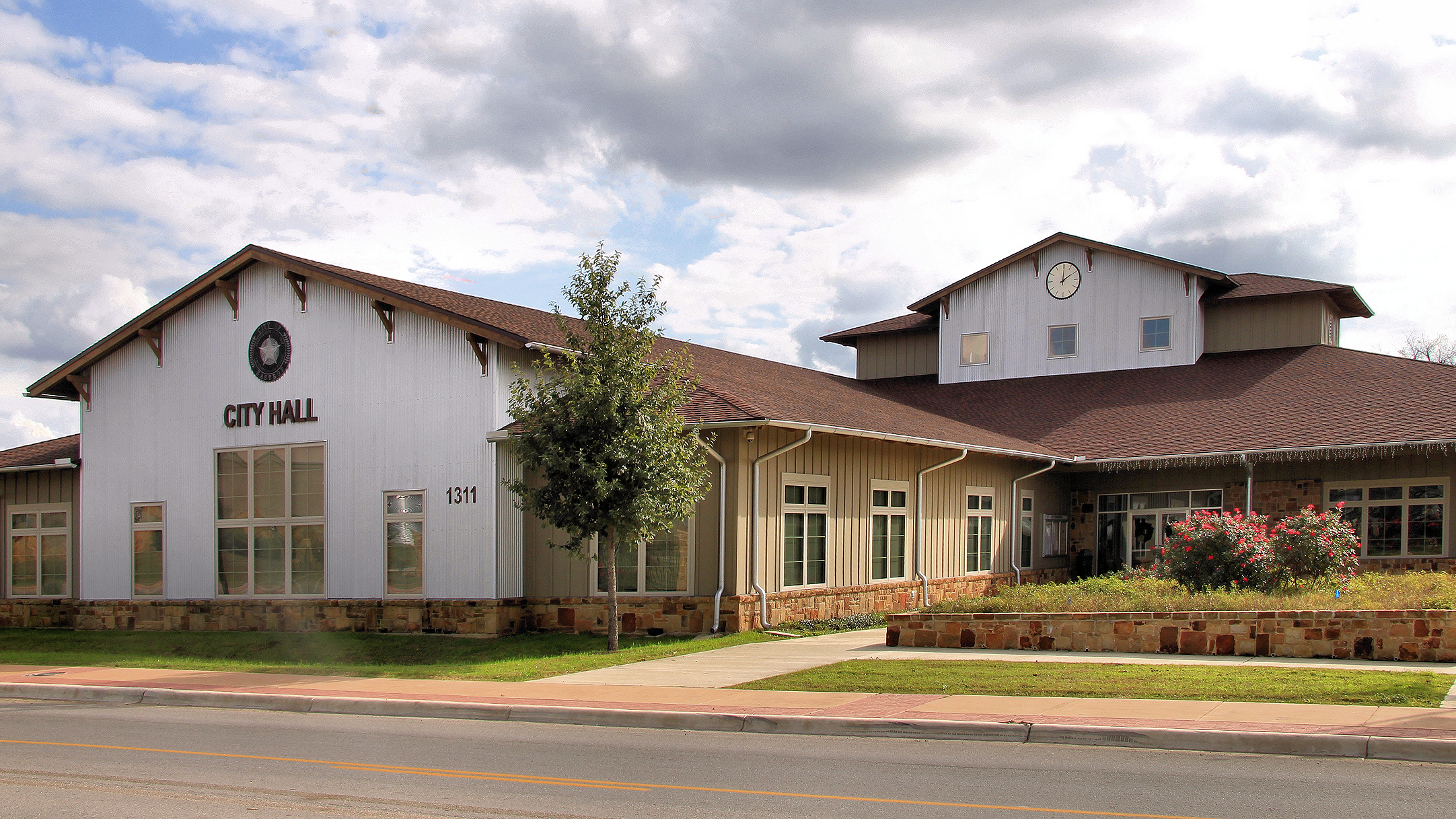
- Bastrop City Hall

- Logo
- Nicknames: The Most Historic Small Town in Texas; Heart of the Lost Pines
- Interactive map of Bastrop, Texas
- Location within Texas Location within the United States Location within North America
- Coordinates: 30°06′42″N 97°19′04″W
- Country: United States
- State: Texas
- County: Bastrop
- Incorporated: December 18, 1837

Government
  - Type: Council-manager government
  - Mayor: Ishmael Harris
  - City Manager: Sylvia Carrillo

Area
  - Total: 9.34 sq mi (24.20 km^{2})
  - Land: 9.22 sq mi (23.89 km^{2})
  - Water: 0.12 sq mi (0.31 km^{2})
- Elevation: 367 ft (112 m)

Population (2020)
  - Total: 9,688
  - Estimate (2025): 13,383
  - Density: 1,002.0/sq mi (386.87/km^{2})
- Time zone: UTC-6 (Central (CST))
  - Summer (DST): UTC-5 (CDT)
- ZIP code: 78602
- Area codes: 512, 737
- FIPS code: 48-05864
- GNIS feature ID: 2409795
- Website: cityofbastrop.org

Bastrop (/ˈbæstrəp, -trɒp/) is a city and the county seat of Bastrop County, Texas, United States. Its population was 9,688 according to the 2020 census. It is located about 30 mi (48 km) southeast of Austin and is part of the Greater Austin metropolitan area.

== History ==
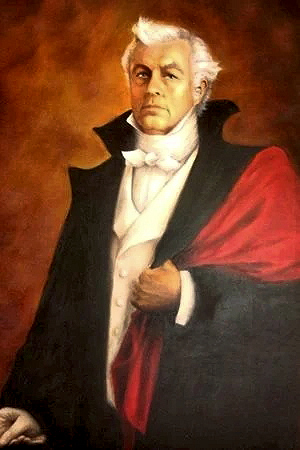
Felipe Enrique Neri, Baron de Bastrop

Spanish soldiers lived temporarily at the current site of Bastrop as early as 1804, when a fort was established where the Old San Antonio Road crossed the Colorado River and named Puesta del Colorado.

Bastrop's namesake, Felipe Enrique Neri, Baron de Bastrop, was a commoner named Philip Hendrik Nering Bogel, who was wanted for embezzlement in his native country of the Netherlands. In Texas, he assisted Moses and Stephen F. Austin in obtaining land grants in Texas and served as Austin's land commissioner. In 1827, Austin located about 100 families in an area adjacent to his earlier Mexican contracts. Austin arranged for Mexican officials to name a new town there after the baron who died the same year.

On June 8, 1832, the town was platted along conventional Mexican lines, with a square in the center and blocks set aside for public buildings. The town was named Bastrop, but two years later, the Coahuila y Tejas legislature renamed it Mina in honor of Francisco Javier Mina, a Mexican revolutionary hero and martyr. The town was incorporated under the laws of the Republic of Texas on December 18, 1837, and the name was changed back to Bastrop.

Overlooking the center of the town is the Lost Pines Forest. Composed of loblolly pines (Pinus taeda), the forest is the center of the westernmost stand of the southern pine forest. As the only timber available in the area, the forest contributed to the local economy. Bastrop began supplying Austin with lumber in 1839 and then San Antonio, the western Texas frontier, and parts of Mexico.

A fire in 1862 destroyed most of downtown Bastrop's commercial buildings and the county courthouse. As a result, most current downtown structures postdate the Civil War. In 1978, the National Register of Historic Places listed 131 Bastrop buildings and sites. This earned Bastrop the title of the "Most Historic Small Town in Texas".

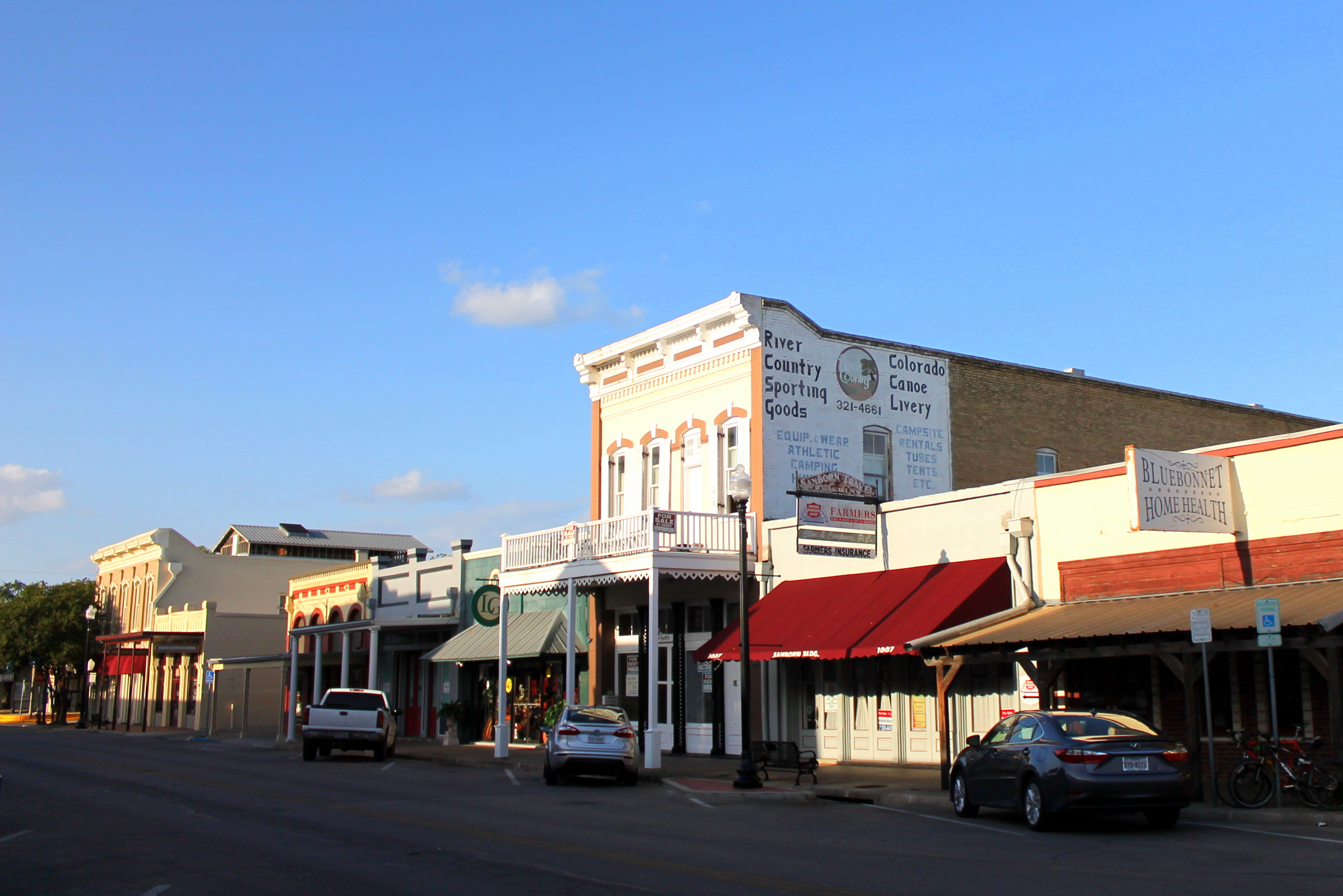
Historic buildings in downtown Bastrop

The first edition of the Bastrop Advertiser and County News (now The Bastrop Advertiser) was published on March 1, 1853, giving it claim to be the oldest continuously published weekly (semiweekly since September 5, 1977) in Texas. The wider Bastrop County is also covered by papers such as the Elgin Courier.

On September 4, 2011, two wildfires started when trees fell on power lines. The first fire started in the community of Circle D-KC Estates near Bastrop State Park, and the other fire started about 4 mi (6 km) north. The two fires merged into the Bastrop County Complex fire. This was the worst and most destructive wildfire in Texas history, as it destroyed 1,691 homes, killed two people, and caused $325 million of insured property damage. The drought in Texas at the time combined with strong winds from the Gulf of Mexico caused by Tropical Storm Lee helped fuel the fire.

From August 14, 2018 to May 21, 2019, the City of Bastrop put a moratorium on new developments due to flooding and drainage issues.

== Geography ==
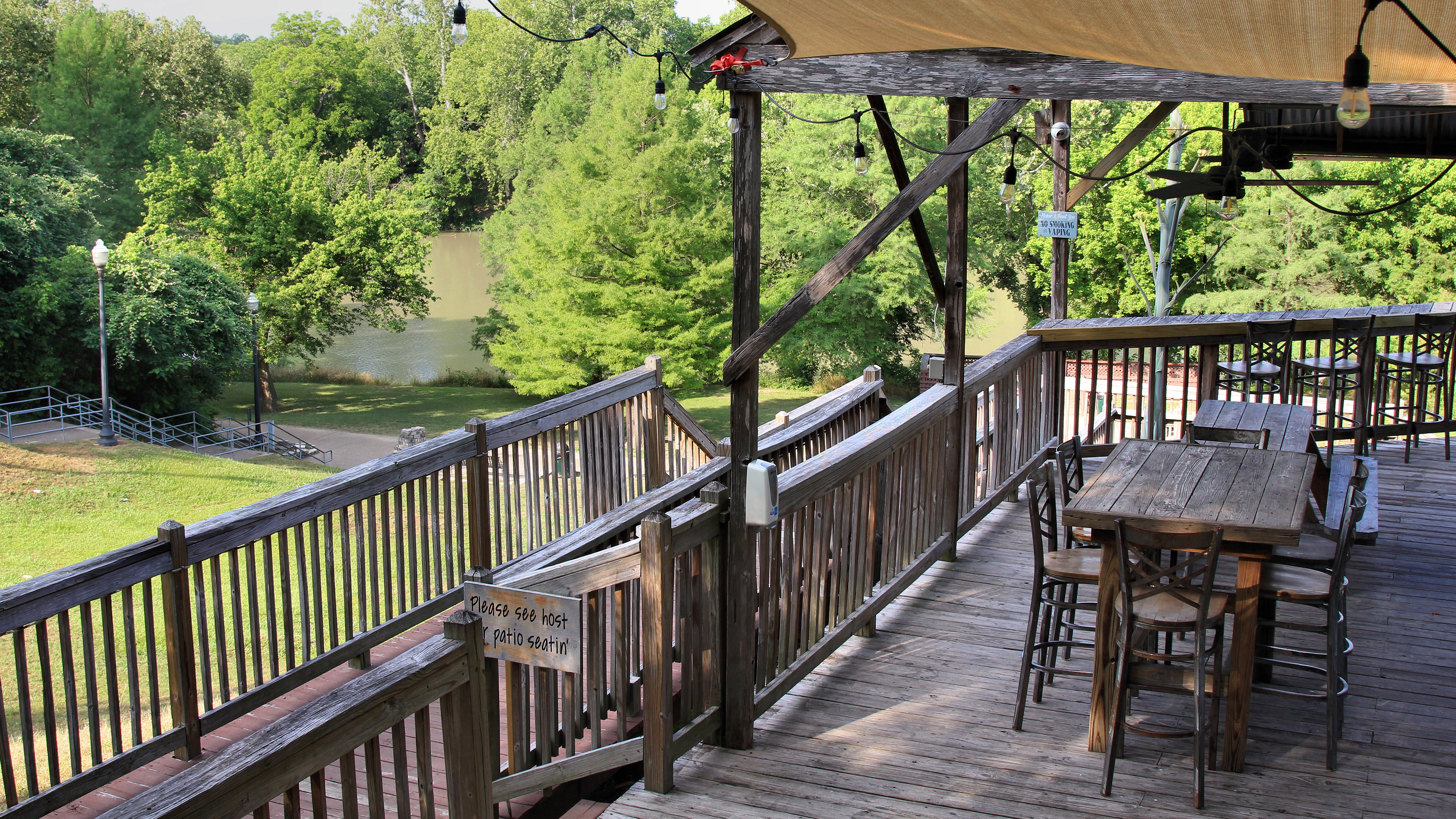
The Colorado River from a downtown Bastrop business.

Bastrop is located near the center of Bastrop County along the lower Colorado River. The downtown business district of the city is located on a bluff on the east bank of the river, but the city extends to the west side of the river, as well. According to the United States Census Bureau, the city has a total area of 9.1 square miles (23.6 km^{2}), of which 9.0 sq mi (23.3 km^{2}) are land and 0.12 sq mi (0.3 km^{2}), or 1.23%, is covered by water.

Three miles (5 km) northeast of the town, Lake Bastrop is a 906-acre (3.67 km^{2}) reservoir on Spicer Creek operated by the Lower Colorado River Authority (LCRA) since its impounding in 1964. Although primarily used as a cooling pond for the Sim Gideon Power Plant, the lake is also used for recreation, and the LCRA maintains two public parks on the lake.

=== Climate ===
Bastrop tends to be cooler than other central Texas cities, but can reach 100 °F in the summer. Extreme temperatures range from –1 to 111 °F.

Climate data for Bastrop, Texas
Month	Jan	Feb	Mar	Apr	May	Jun	Jul	Aug	Sep	Oct	Nov	Dec	Year
Record high °F	88	96	98	102	103	106	111	110	111	105	94	91	111
Mean daily maximum °F	63	66	73	80	87	92	95	97	91	83	73	64	83
Mean daily minimum °F	38	41	48	56	64	70	72	72	66	56	47	39	56
Record low °F	−1	6	17	25	38	50	52	50	43	27	20	3	−1
Average precipitation inches	2.56	2.54	2.85	2.65	4.50	3.66	2.23	2.19	3.69	4.82	3.30	2.72	37.71
Record high °C	31	36	37	39	39	41	44	43	44	41	34	33	44
Mean daily maximum °C	17	19	23	27	31	33	35	36	33	28	23	18	28
Mean daily minimum °C	3	5	9	13	18	21	22	22	19	13	8	4	13
Record low °C	−18	−14	−8	−4	3	10	11	10	6	−3	−7	−16	−18
Average precipitation mm	65	65	72	67	114	93	57	56	94	122	84	69	958
Source: weather.com

== Demographics ==
Historical population
Census	Pop.	Note	%±
1860	1,107		—
1870	1,199		8.3%
1880	1,546		28.9%
1890	1,634		5.7%
1900	2,145		31.3%
1910	1,707		−20.4%
1920	1,828		7.1%
1930	1,895		3.7%
1940	1,976		4.3%
1950	3,176		60.7%
1960	3,001		−5.5%
1970	3,112		3.7%
1980	3,789		21.8%
1990	4,044		6.7%
2000	5,340		32.0%
2010	7,218		35.2%
2020	9,688		34.2%
2025 (est.)	13,383		38.1%
U.S. Decennial Census

=== 2020 census ===
As of the 2020 census, Bastrop had a population of 9,688 and 2,022 families in the city. The median age was 38.6 years, with 22.6% of residents under 18 and 18.9% of residents 65 or older. For every 100 females, there were 91.5 males, and for every 100 females 18 and over, there were 89.5 males 18 and over.

About 96.4% of residents lived in urban areas, while 3.6% lived in rural areas.

Of the 3,714 households in Bastrop, 32.4% had children under 18 living in them, 43.4% were married-couple households, 16.8% were households with a male householder and no spouse or partner present, and 33.2% were households with a female householder and no spouse or partner present. About 30.0% of all households were made up of individuals, and 13.5% had someone living alone who was 65 or older.

The city had 4,089 housing units, of which 9.2% were vacant. Among occupied housing units, 52.2% were owner-occupied and 47.8% were renter-occupied. The homeowner vacancy rate was 3.1% and the rental vacancy rate was 7.6%.

Racial composition as of the 2020 census
Race	Percentage
White	64.9%
Black or African American	10.2%
American Indian and Alaska Native	1.1%
Asian	2.4%
Native Hawaiian and other Pacific Islander	0.2%
Some other race	7.6%
Two or more races	13.6%
Hispanic or Latino (of any race)	24.9%

=== 2000 census ===
As of the 2000 census, 5,340 people resided in Bastrop in 2034 households and 1336 families. The population density was 734.8 inhabitants per square mile (283.7/km^{2}). The 2,239 housing units averaged 308.1 per square mile (118.9/km^{2}). The racial makeup of the city was 72.3% White, 17.0% African American, 1.0% Asian, 0.7% Native American, 7.0% from other races, and 1.9% from two or more races. About 17.8% of the population was Hispanic or Latino of any race.

Of the 2,034 households, 32.8% had children under 18 living with them, 46.6% were married couples living together, 15.3% had a female householder with no husband present, and 34.3% were not families. About 29.4% of all households were made up of individuals, and 12.6% had someone living alone who was 65 or older. The average household size was 2.46 and the average family size was 3.05.

In the city, the age distribution was 25.5% under 18, 8.3% from 18 to 24, 29.6% from 25 to 44, 21.8% from 45 to 64, and 14.8% who were 65 or older. The median age was 36 years. For every 100 females, there were 97.0 males. For every 100 females 18 and over, there were 91.2 males.

The median income in the city for a household was $40,212 and for a family was $49,258. Males had a median income of $34,388 versus $27,582 for females. The per capita income for the city was $19,862; 11.7% of the population and 10.1% of families were below the poverty line. Of the total population, 15.6% of those under 18 and 13.6% of those 65 and older were living below the poverty line.

== Economy ==
As of 2020, the area's four largest employers were the Bastrop Independent School District, Hyatt Regency Lost Pines Resort and Spa, Bastrop County government, and MD Anderson Cancer Center.

The Hyatt Regency Lost Pines Resort and Spa (situated about 15 mi west of the City of Bastrop on 405 acres), opened on June 2, 2006, with 491 rooms; it gave a boost to employment and sales tax in the area. When the property changed ownership in 2011, officials stated it employed 600 individuals plus 175 additional seasonal employees – making it the largest private employer in Bastrop County.

Elon Musk's companies have buildings located just outside Bastrop city limits, including The Boring Company headquarters, a SpaceX facility, and the headquarters of X.

Federal Correctional Institution Bastrop, a prison of the Federal Bureau of Prisons, is in nearby Camp Swift.

== Arts and culture ==
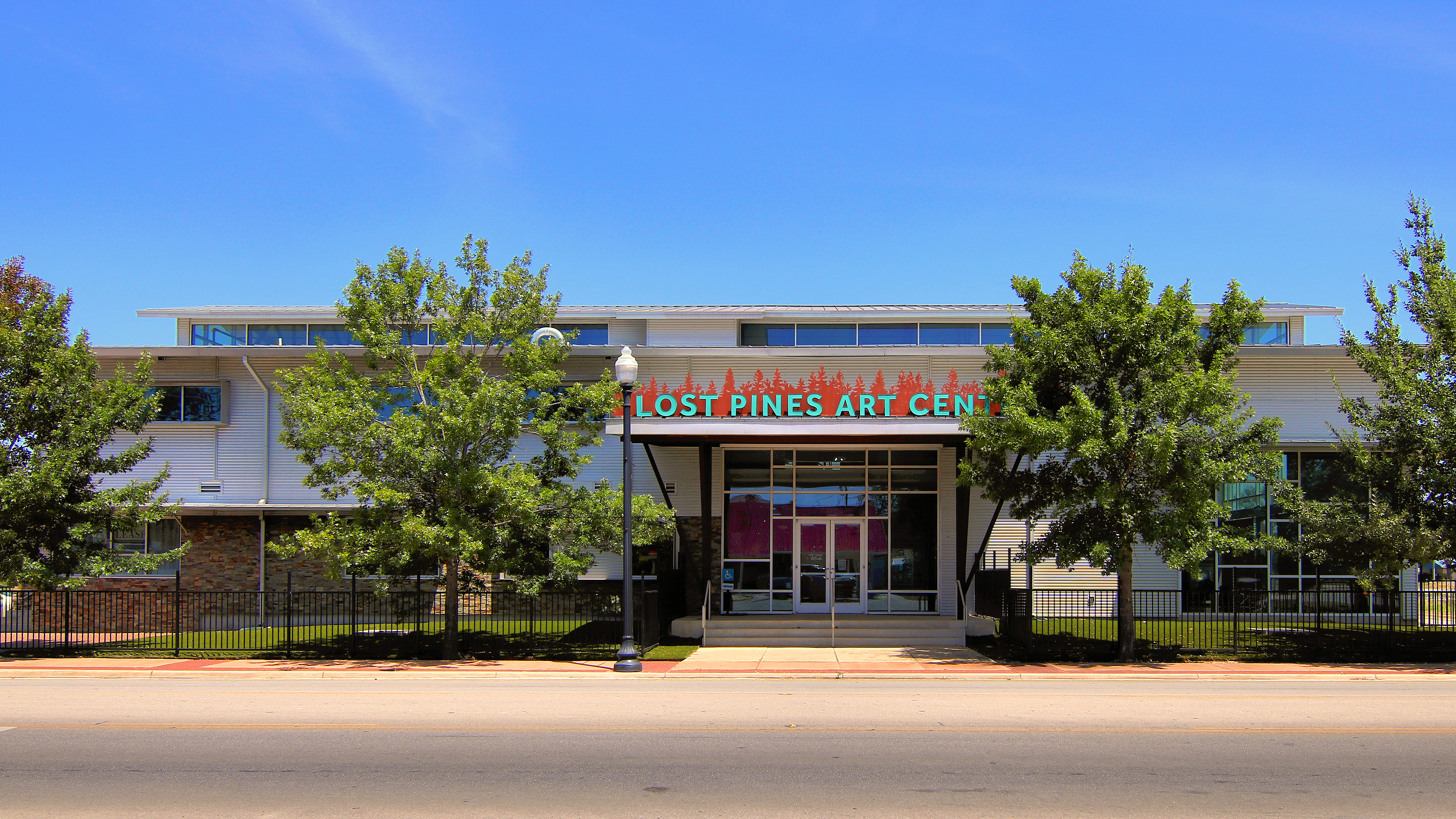
The Lost Pines Art Center

Bastrop is designated as an official Cultural Arts District by the Texas Commission on the Arts. The 12,000-square-foot Lost Pines Art Center, the historic 1889 Bastrop Opera House and Pyrology Foundry & Studio (formerly Deep in the Heart Art Foundry) showcase a mix of visual, performing, and industrial arts. Main Street, Bastrop is filled with local galleries, craft boutiques, live music venues, and public art installations. Events like the monthly First Friday Art Walk draw locals and visitors to engage directly with featured regional artists.

The Bastrop County Museum & Visitor Center, located in downtown Bastrop inside a historic 1930s former city hall and fire station, serves as the primary hub for preserving and sharing the history of Bastrop.

== Parks and recreation ==
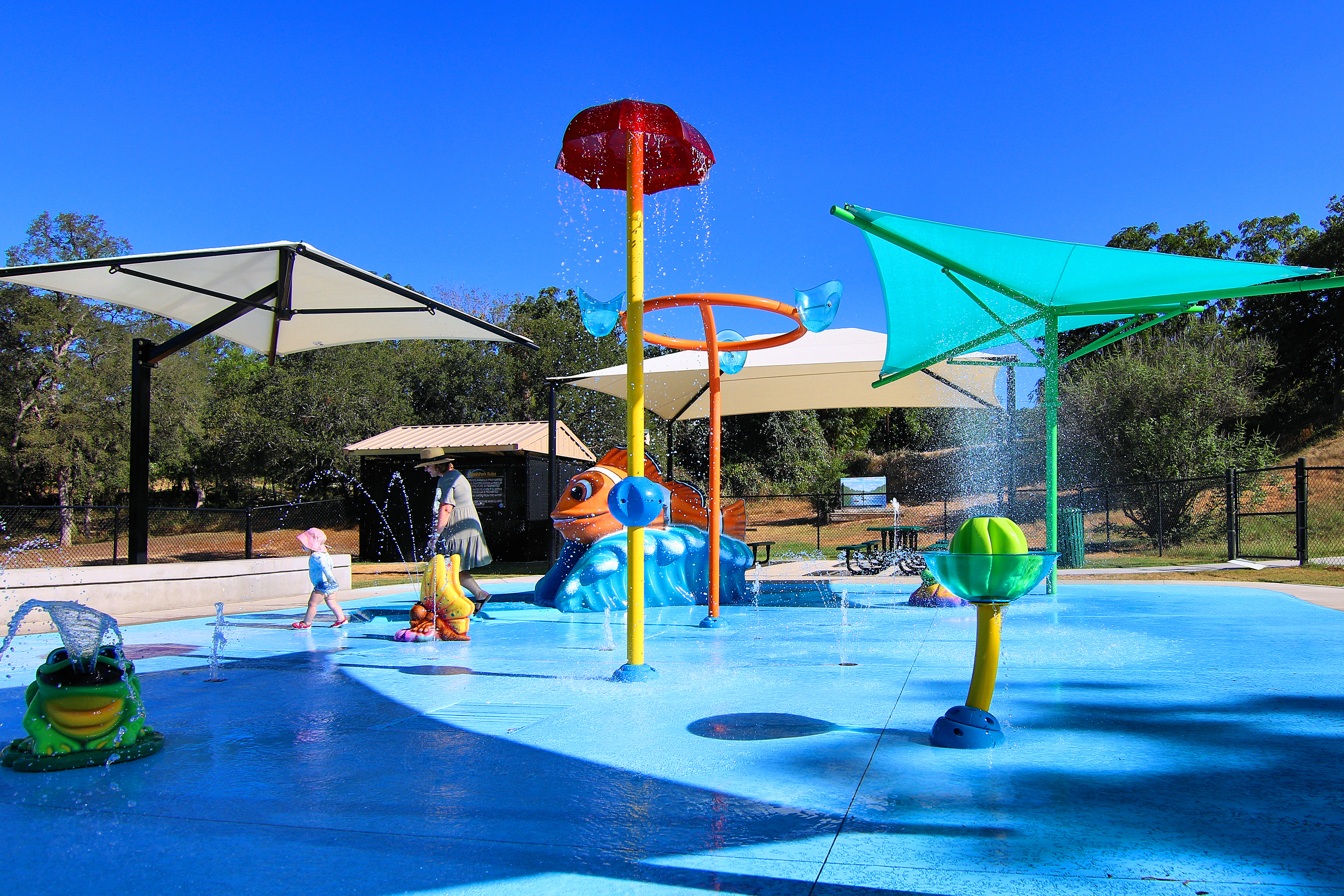
The splash pad in Fisherman's Park

The City of Bastrop operates several public parks and recreational spaces featuring river access, sports fields, trails, and playgrounds, primarily managed daily via the City of Bastrop Parks and Recreation Department. These include Fisherman's Park, Bob Bryant Park,, Ferry Park and Minerva Delgado Park. Fisherman's Park and Delgado Park both have splash pads.

In addition, Bastrop State Park operated by the Texas Parks and Wildlife Department sits on the eastern edge of town and has a public swimming pool.

== Education ==
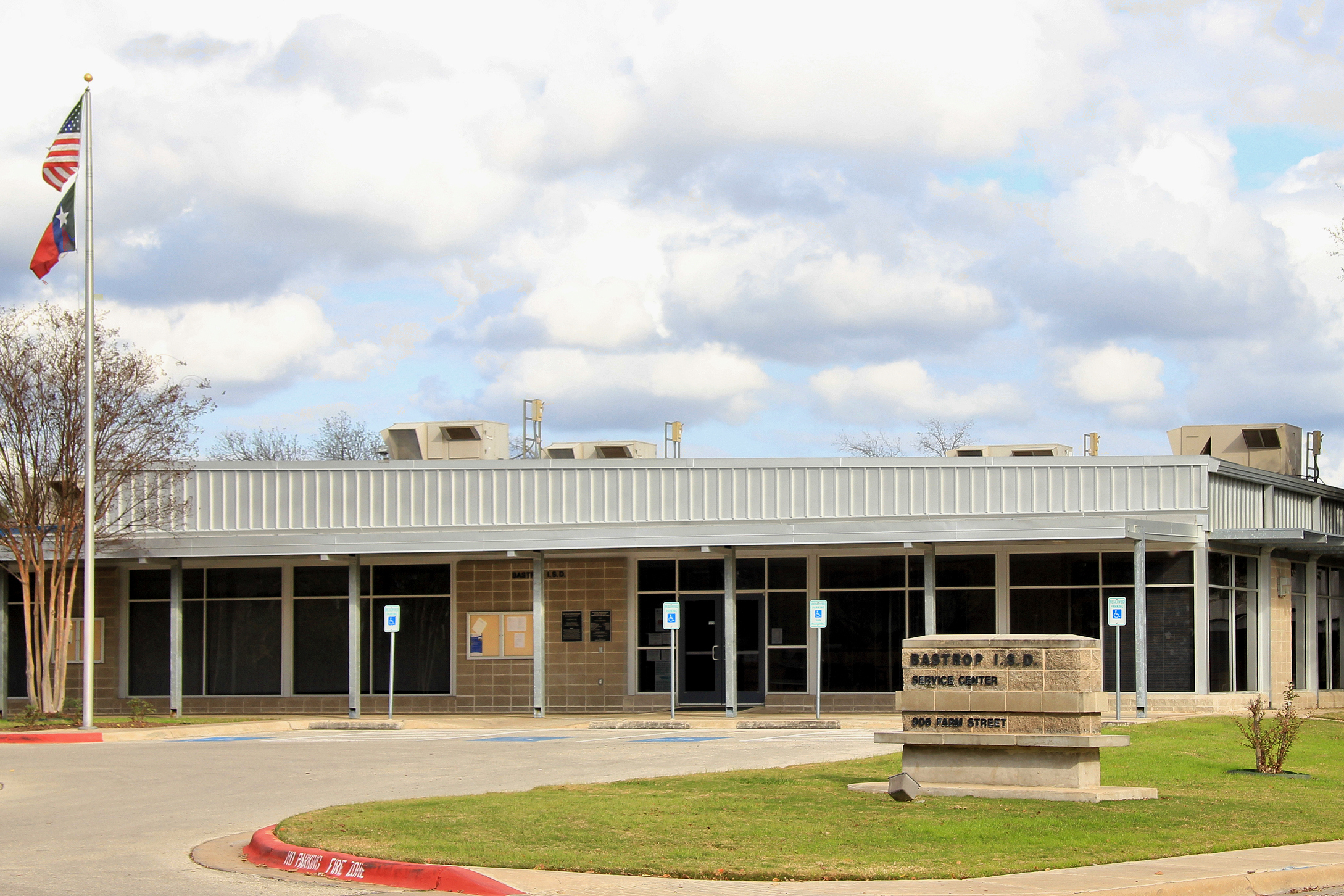
Bastrop ISD headquarters

The Bastrop Independent School District serves Bastrop. Students in kindergarten through grade 5 attend either Adelton, Colony Oaks, Emile, or Mina Elementary School. Students in grades 6-8 attend either Bastrop or Riverside Middle School. Students in grades 9-12 attend Bastrop High School.

Austin Community College conducts night and continuing-education classes at Bastrop High School.

From 1893 until 1969, Emile High School served as the segregated black high school.

== Notable people ==
- Carolyn Banks, fiction writer
- Trent Brown, offensive tackle in the NFL for the Houston Texans
- John Wheeler Bunton, Texas pioneer and signatory of the Texas Declaration of Independence
- Geoff Connor, former Texas secretary of state, American public servant, attorney, historian, and businessman
- Greenleaf Fisk (1807–1888), a legislator in the Republic of Texas and Bastrop County chief justice
- Louis Edwin Fry Sr. (1903–2000), former chair of the department of architecture at Howard University
- Adrian Grenier, actor
- Ryan Holiday, author
- Zachary Levi, actor
- Richard Linklater, director and writer
- Michael Moorcock, science fiction/fantasy writer
- Thomas R. Phillips, former Texas Supreme Court Chief Justice
- Rodney Reed, Texas death row inmate
- Billy Waugh, former American Special Forces sergeant major and CIA officer
- Lovie Yancey, founder of international burger chain Fatburger

== See also ==
- National Register of Historic Places listings in Bastrop County, Texas
- Recorded Texas Historic Landmarks in Bastrop County
- Fairview Cemetery (Bastrop, Texas)
