= History of Texas forests =

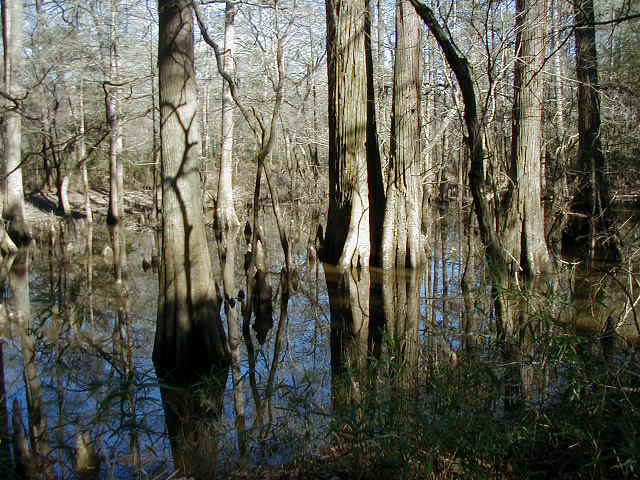
Swamp land in the Big Thicket forests

The forests in the U.S. state of Texas have been an important resource since its earliest days and have played a major role in the state's history. The vast woodlands of the region, home to many varieties of wildlife before Europeans first showed up, provided economic opportunities for early settlers. They continue to play an important role economically and environmentally in the state.

The densest forest lands lie in the eastern part of the state in the Piney Woods region. In particular the Big Thicket region, just north of Houston and Beaumont, has historically been home to the densest woodlands. The Big Thicket was mostly uninhabited until heavy settlement from the U.S. began in the mid-19th century, and was even used as a refuge by runaway slaves and other fugitives. The Rio Grande Valley in South Texas was home to a large palm tree forest when Spaniards first arrived, though today very little of it remains.

One of the first steam sawmills in Texas was planned in 1829 in what is now modern Houston. After the Texas Revolution lumber production increased steadily such that by 1860 there were reportedly 200 saw mills in the state. The construction of railroads throughout the eastern part of the state led to boom in lumber production starting in the 1880s. The following 50-year period in which the Texas timber industry flourished came to be known as the "bonanza era". Though the growth of the industry provided significant economic benefits to Texas, a lack of regulation allowed business owners to exploit many individuals including appropriating private property and forcing laborers to accept poor working conditions and low wages.

By the start of the 20th century timber was one of the leading economic engines of Texas and had become the state's largest manufacturing enterprise. Lumber barons, such as John Henry Kirby, were among the wealthiest people in the state. By 1907 Texas was the third largest lumber producer in the United States. The subsequent clearing of fields for oil exploration and the related demand for lumber through the first half of the 20th century destroyed much of the remaining forest lands in the state. By the 1920s lumber production was in decline and the onset of the Great Depression devastated the already flagging industry.

In recent times preservation efforts, such as the creation of the Texas Big Thicket National Preserve in 1974, have helped to stabilize parts of the Texas woodlands. As of 1999 Texas remains in the top ten timber producing states in the United States.

== Ecological patterns ==
Annual precipitation across Texas ranges from more than 50 inches (1,300 mm) in the east to less than 5 inches (130 mm) in the west.

The climate in Texas varies greatly across the state. Humid, rain-soaked swamps lie toward the east and desert lands lie in the far west. Woodlands, grasslands, brushland, and other ecological regions can be found in between and around the state. A prominent climatic feature of Texas is a dry line that runs north-south through its center. This line, though not entirely fixed in its location, represents a point east of which relatively moist air from the Gulf of Mexico flows freely, and west of which the drier air from the Mexican deserts prevails. The forest lands, of course, mostly lie to the east of this line though pockets of woodland can be found in the mountains to the west. Texas is periodically subjected to extreme droughts that can last several years, even as much as a decade. The most severe example in modern history was the 1950s drought that reshaped the state's economy. These drought periods are known to dramatically reduce the forests. The severe drought of 2011, for example, is estimated to have killed between two and ten percent of the state's trees.

Texas forest lands can be divided into six major regions: the Big Thicket, the Piney Woods, the Gulf Coast, the Edwards Plateau, the lower Rio Grande Valley, and the Trans-Pecos mountain forests. East Texas is home to the Piney Woods, a vast region extending from Texas through parts of Oklahoma, Arkansas, and Louisiana. These woodlands feature many varieties of pine as well as hardwood varieties including magnolia, American sweetgum (Liquidambar styraciflua), and elms (Ulmus spp.). The Big Thicket is the southern portion of this region, and has historically been the most densely wooded part of the state, acting as a natural divide between Southeast Texas and coastal Louisiana. The Texas coastal region has more sparse tree growth but still contains many varieties including southern live oak (Quercus virginiana), mesquite (Prosopis spp.), and Texas Persimmon (Diospyros texana). The Edwards Plateau region of Central Texas contains woodlands featuring Ashe Juniper (Juniperus ashei), Texas Live Oak (Quercus fusiformis), and Honey Mesquite (Prosopis glandulosa). The lower Rio Grande Valley has historically been home to a large semitropical forest of Mexican Palmetto (Sabal mexicana). Though West Texas is mostly grasslands and desert, mountainous areas in the Trans-Pecos portion, such as the Guadalupe Mountains, contain oases of forest lands featuring Bigtooth Maple (Acer grandidentatum), Velvet Ash (Fraxinus velutina), Grey Oak (Quercus grisea), and similar tree species.

Additional pockets of forest lands include the Cross Timbers areas of North Texas in the vicinity of the Dallas – Fort Worth metroplex, the Lost Pines Forest of Central Texas, as well as other areas throughout the savanna and blackland prairies that lie to the west of the Piney Woods and the coastal areas. For its part the Cross Timbers region, which straddles Texas and Oklahoma, though relatively narrow, was once dense enough to have been considered a natural barrier. Though these woodland areas have never been a major source of lumber they have nevertheless provided firewood as well as wood for poles, railroad construction and other limited uses. Patches of original oak and hickory woodland remain in the ranchlands of eastern Texas, west of the Piney Woods, and these have been described as the East Central Texas forests ecoregion.

== Early Texas and the Republic of Texas ==
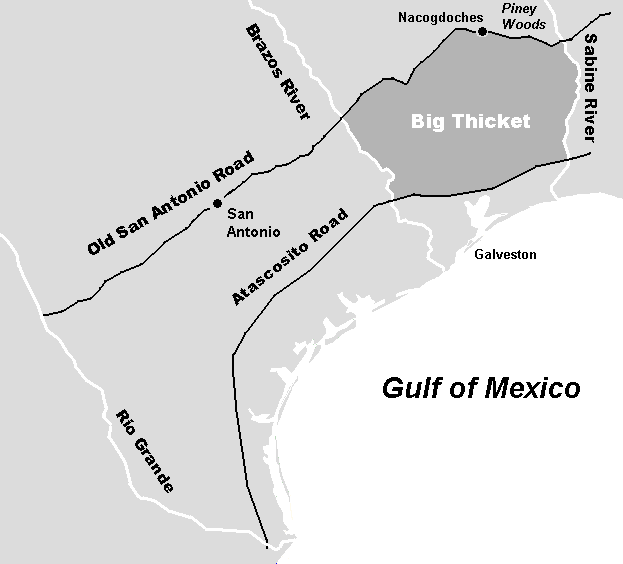
Traditional limits of the Big Thicket region prior to the Texas Revolution. Deforestation has dramatically reduced its size.

The Big Thicket forest region once covered more than 2 million acres (8,100 km^{2}) in east Texas. The Spaniards, who once ruled the region, defined its boundaries in the north as El Camino Real de los Tejas / Old San Antonio Road, a trail system that ran from Central Texas to Nacogdoches; in the south as La Bahia Road or Atascosito Road, a trail that ran from southwest Louisiana into southeast Texas west of Galveston Bay; to the west by the Brazos River; and to the east by the Sabine River. This thickly wooded area proved to be a natural barrier against settlement. It had remained largely uninhabited even by Native Americans until the 19th century.

In the Rio Grande Valley a large forest of Mexican Palmetto (Sabal mexicana) extended from the coast to approximately 80 miles (130 km) inland as late as 1852. Spanish explorer Alonzo Alvarez de Pineda, in fact, named the river Río de las Palmas (Palm River) in 1519 because of the forest that surrounded it.

When Europeans first arrived in east Texas the Hasinai, Bidai, and Akokisa tribes lived at the fringes of the Big Thicket lands. These predominantly agriculture-based peoples avoided settlement in the forests primarily because the sandy soils of these forest lands were much less fertile than the clay-rich soils outside the dense forests.

During the early 19th century the gradual westward migration of settlers in North America made the forests of east Texas a popular refuge for runaway slaves and fugitives from justice in the United States.

One of the first steam sawmills in Texas was planned in 1829 by John Richardson Harris, founder of Harrisburg (part of modern Houston). It operated until at least 1833. After the Texas Revolution, the influx of settlers quickly increased demand for lumber. Sawmills were constructed on the coast in locations such as Galveston, Houston, and Beaumont. As settlement moved further inland new mills were constructed at towns from Nacodoches to Bastrop.

The Lost Pines Forest near Bastrop, the westernmost stand of pine trees in the state, became an important source of lumber for Central Texas.

== State of Texas in the 1800s ==
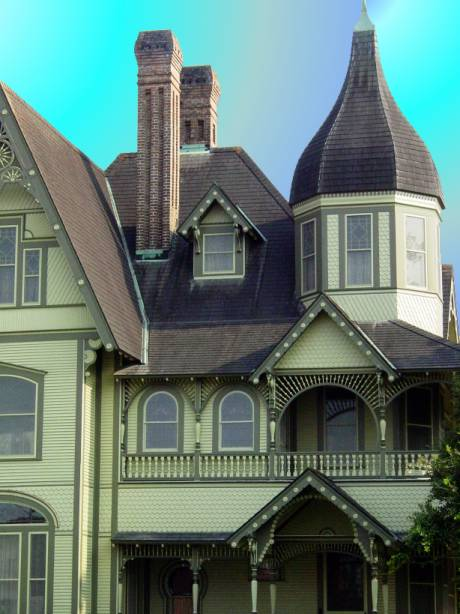
The W. H. Stark House in Orange, a historic home built near the peak of lumber production

Following the annexation of Texas by the United States, the timber industry in the state continued to develop. By 1860 there were reportedly 200 saw mills in the state. The value of lumber products exceeded US$1.75 million annually (US$62.7 million in today's terms).

In Central Texas the forest lands became depleted much faster than in the East. Over the course of the mid-19th century oak lumber was becoming so scarce in many areas that masonry rapidly began to replace wood construction in many communities.

Even as late as 1870 the major forests of East Texas were largely pristine with some trees growing to more than 150 feet (46 m) in height and more than 5 feet (1.5 m) in diameter. This began to change rapidly in the 1880s as railroad lines were completed across the state. In 1877 Pennsylvania entrepreneurs Henry J. Lutcher and G. Bedell Moore established a major mill in Orange, creating the largest and most modern operation in the state. The timber industry entered what was known as the "bonanza era" as lumber plants and logging roads criss-crossed the forests. Plant owners built company towns, including Camden, Kirbyville and Diboll, to attract employees. Working conditions for timber workers was harsh and dangerous. Work days averaged 11 hours and pay was typically between US$1.50 to US$2.50 per day (US$58 to US$97 in today's terms). In many cases the owners established a nearly feudal structure of control exercising near absolute authority over the towns and their residents.

In the late 19th century a new technology known as the skidder was introduced to the Texas logging industry. The skidder consisted of a railway car with a crane assembly and long cables that dragged logs from the forest after they were felled. The dragging process was tremendously destructive to the forests in which they were used and dramatically hastened the rate at which forests were cleared, both because of its efficiency at extracting logs and because of the incidental damage to the flora.

A significant consequence of the growth of the lumber industry was the taking of land from families that had once owned it. Because of "use and possession" laws in force in Texas at that time, lumber barons flush with cash from Northern investors were able to seize lands belonging to local families, often property that had been in the families for generations.

East Texas farmer John Henry Kirby gradually acquired multiple mills eventually consolidating them in 1901 as the Kirby Lumber Company, the state's largest at the turn of the 20th century. Kirby would go on to be referred to as the "Prince of Pines" by the press in Texas.

== Oil boom and the world wars ==
Historical Timber Production in Texas
Year	Annual production
1869	100 million board feet (240,000 m^{3})
1879	300 million board feet (710,000 m^{3})
1907	2,250 million board feet (5,300,000 m^{3})
1932	350 million board feet (830,000 m^{3})
1940	1,000 million board feet (2,400,000 m^{3})
1991	1,134 million board feet (2,680,000 m^{3})
1992	1,250 million board feet (2,900,000 m^{3})
1997	1,370 million board feet (3,200,000 m^{3})

By the start of the 20th century agriculture (particularly cotton), timber, and ranching were the leading economic engines of Texas. Lumber production became the largest manufacturing enterprise in the state, and the industry continued to grow in the early years of the century. Production grew from 300 million board feet (710,000 m^{3}) annually in 1879 to 2,250 million board feet (5,300,000 m^{3}) in 1907, the maximum the state has ever produced. Texas became the third leading lumber-producing state in the U.S. World War I only increased this demand as pine-built ships were common at this time.

The early 20th century saw the expansion of large lumber companies from outside Texas into the state. Long-Bell Lumber Company, a Kansas-based company (now part of International Paper), established a subsidiary in Lufkin, Texas in 1905 with further expansion thereafter. Other outside companies came as well with many following a cut-out-and-get-out policy, harvesting all available resources in an area and then abandoning it completely. Even at the start of the 20th century it was becoming clear that the rate at which the Piney Woods were being harvested was unsustainable. In 1904 a U.S. forester asserted that, given logging practices at that time, the virgin forests would likely not last more than two decades.

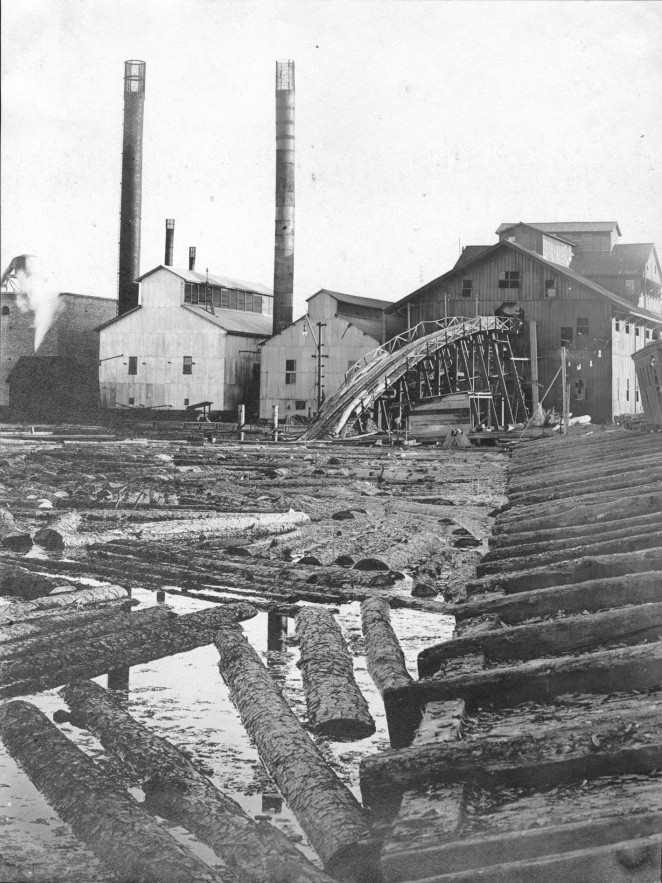
Southern Pine Lumber Company sawmill and millpond, circa 1907

In 1901 the Gladys City Oil, Gas, and Manufacturing Company struck oil at Spindletop Hill, near Beaumont, Texas. Though petroleum extraction had existed in Texas before this strike, Spindletop was by far the most productive well in world history. This event launched an era of economic growth that was unparalleled in the state's history. The subsequent clearing of fields for oil exploration and the related demand for lumber through the first half of the 20th century destroyed much of the remaining forest lands in the state.

By the end of World War I demand for timber was declining. The Texas timber industry as a whole had, in fact, already peaked in 1907–1908. By the 1920s, the forest lands in Texas had become severely depleted and most of the virgin pine had been cut. The lumber industry slowed substantially as lumber companies, whose properties were largely exhausted of timber, slowed or halted operations. Long-Bell and other lumber companies abandoned Texas and moved on to the Pacific coast and other areas of the country. By 1932, during the Great Depression, production in Texas had fallen to 350 million board feet (830,000 m^{3}). The 50-year bonanza era had come to a close, with approximately 18 million acres (73,000 km^{2}) of forest having been cut by lumber interests.

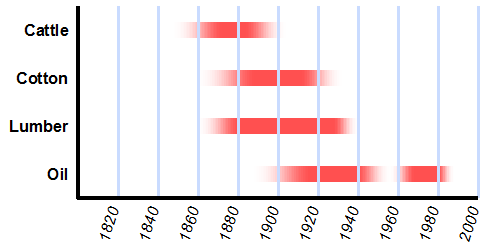
Boom periods of the four major industries that built the early Texas economy

In the south, immigration and development in the Rio Grande Valley led to clearing of the palm-tree forests for agriculture. By the 1930s the once extensive forests in the valley had been reduced to small tracts around Brownsville.

Efforts to preserve what remained of the forests began to emerge. The East Texas Big Thicket Association was formed in the 1920s to preserve what little remained of the Big Thicket. Though its impact was limited it demonstrated increasing concern about the woodlands. In 1924 the state forester E. O. Siecke succeeded in establishing the first state forest in Texas (named E. O. Siecke State Forest in 1951). The forest consisted of 1,702 acres (6.9 km^{2}) near Kirbyville. By 1925 additional state forest lands had been acquired in Cherokee and Montgomery Counties.

In 1930 the Angelina County Lumber Company planted 200,000 pine seedlings representing one of the first significant efforts at reforestation in the state. In 1933 the Texas legislature authorized the purchase of specific lands for the National Forest system, thus creating Angelina, Davy Crockett, Sam Houston, and Sabine National Forests. These lands were largely areas that had been cut over and cleared by lumber interests. The United States Forest Service and the Texas Forest Service began efforts to re-establish forests on these and other properties around the state.

== Recent times ==
In 1944 a tree farm program was started in Texas following the model set forth by the state of Alabama. Under the sponsorship of various public and private organizations, including the Texas Forest Service and the East Texas Chamber of Commerce, the program established training and certification criteria that encourage sustainable harvesting practices and protect the local wildlife and ecology.

The timber industry in Texas gradually began to blossom again in the mid-20th century as new technological developments, including log debarkers and pine-based plywood, made it possible to use more of each individual tree and thus made them more valuable. By 1982, lumber producers ranked among the top manufacturing businesses in the state.

In 1974 the Texas Big Thicket National Preserve of 84,550 acres (342.2 km^{2}) was created by Congress. The preserve actually consists of 12 distinct units of forest land that are protected from lumbering activities. These and other preservation efforts have helped to stabilize parts of the Texas woodlands.

Tree farm certifications grew steadily in the mid-20th century. By 1984 there were 2,510 certified, privately owned farms in the state encompassing more than 4 million acres (16,000 km^{2}) of timberland, mostly in East Texas.

In 1994 the national forests alone in Texas produced 93.8 million board feet (221,000 m^{3}) of timber, providing US$73.1 million (US$159 million in today's terms) in income and 2,098 jobs. In 1992 the timber companies in the state produced more than 1,250 million board feet (2,900,000 m^{3}) and in 1997 they produced more than 1,370 million board feet (3,200,000 m^{3}). As of 1999 Texas was the tenth largest timber producing state in the nation. The primary wood product is the Southern yellow pine largely supplying the housing sector in the state. Cities like Nacogdoches, Lufkin, Beaumont, and Marshall still have large lumber firms that make up a substantial portion of their economies.

As of 2010 the World Wide Fund for Nature considers the Piney Woods region to be one of the critically endangered ecoregions of the United States.

== Notable enterprises and people ==
=== Lumber barons ===
Historical Lumber Empires
Company	Founder(s)	Founded
Lutcher-Moore; Lumber Company	Henry J. Lutcher, G. Bedell Moore	1842
W.T. Carter and Brother Company	W. T. Carter	1897
Angelina County; Lumber Company	Joseph H. Kurth	1890
Southern Pine; Lumber Company / Temple Industries	Thomas L. L. Temple	1893
Kirby; Lumber Corporation	John H. Kirby	1901
Frost-Johnson; Lumber Company	Enoch Wesley Frost	1902

Henry J. Lutcher and G. Bedell Moore came to the town of Orange in 1877 to enter the fledgling Texas lumber industry. They established the first large-scale milling operation in the state, introduced the use of advanced technology, and set quality standards that would be followed by the lumber industry going forward. Businessmen including Joseph H. Kurth, Thomas L. L. Temple, and W. T. Carter established lumber dynasties that controlled vast regions of the state.

John H. Kirby is considered by some to be the first of the great lumber barons of Texas. He is also regarded as the first major industrialist of the state. Beginning his career as a country lawyer in East Texas, Kirby organized investors in Boston and New York in the 1880s to buy timber land in Texas and start numerous lumber operations. In 1901 he took full control of all of these operations forming the Kirby Lumber Company, the largest in the state and, arguably, the largest in all of the southern United States. Kirby, in fact, once controlled the largest area of pine in the world.

Some lumber barons, including Kirby, transformed themselves into oil barons as the bonanza era of lumber came to a close and the oil boom took hold in the 1920s and 1930s.

=== Preservationists ===
In 1889 the U.S. Bureau of Forestry chief, B. E. Fernow, enlisted the help of Temple, Texas banker W. Goodrich Jones to conduct a survey of the East Texas forests. Jones had knowledge of forestry techniques from his youth in the Black Forest of Germany. He went on to establish the Texas Forest Association in 1914, and lobbied the local lumber companies and the state legislature leading to the establishment of the Texas Forest Service in 1915. Jones came to be known as the Father of Forestry in Texas.

In 1927 R. E. Jackson, a railroad conductor who traveled through the East Texas forests regularly, formed the East Texas Big Thicket Association. The group's explicit purpose was to preserve 400,000 acres (1,600 km^{2}) of the forest and save it from destruction. The group suffered for lack of funds, and the demands for resources during World War II nullified most of its influence.

== See also ==
- List of Texas state forests
- Logging
- Texas Forest Service
- Texas Parks and Wildlife Department
