= Bastrop County Complex Fire =

2011 Texas fire

- Part of the 2011 Texas wildfires
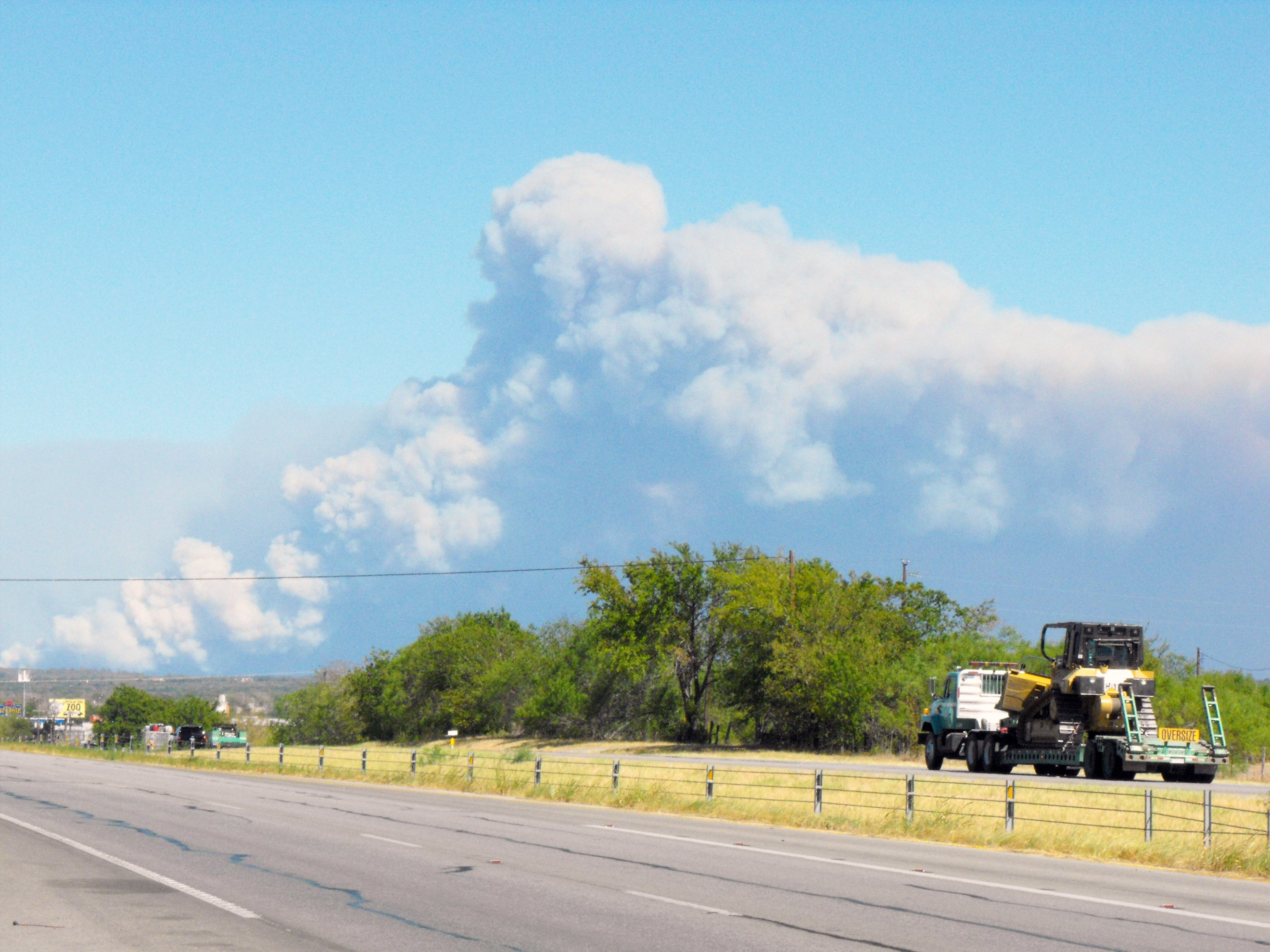
- Smoke from the wildfire as seen from Texas State Highway 71 on September 5, 2011, at a distance of 30 mi (48 km)
- Date: September 4, 2011 – October 29, 2011 (contained October 10, 2011)
- Location: Bastrop County, Texas
- Coordinates: 30°9′4″N 97°13′30″W

Statistics
- Burned area: At least 32,000 acres (13,000 ha)
- Land use: Wildland–urban interface

Impacts
- Deaths: 2 people
- Injuries: 12 people
- Evacuated: 5,000 people
- Structures destroyed: 1,696 (most in Texas history)
- Cost: $325 million (2011 USD) (insured losses; costliest in Texas history)

Ignition
- Cause: Sparks created following contact between wind-snapped trees and power lines

Map
- Perimeter of Bastrop County Complex Fire (map data)
- The fire's location in Texas

The Bastrop County Complex Fire was a conflagration that engulfed parts of Bastrop County, Texas, in September and October 2011. The wildfire was the costliest and most destructive wildfire in Texas history and among the costliest in U.S. history, destroying 1,696 structures and causing an estimated $350 million in insured property damage. An exceptional drought, accompanied by record-high temperatures, affected Texas for much of 2011. Vegetation consequently became severely parched throughout the state, and over the year, an unprecedented amount of land in the state was burned by numerous wildfires. In early September 2011, the presence of Tropical Storm Lee to the east produced strong northerly winds over the state, exacerbating the preexisting dry weather to produce critical fire conditions. On the afternoon of September 4, 2011, three separate fires ignited in the wildland–urban interface east of Bastrop, Texas, after strong winds caused by the nearby tropical storm snapped trees onto power lines. Within 48 hours, the fires merged into one blaze that quickly consumed parts of Bastrop State Park and parts of the Lost Pines Forest, as well as homes in nearby subdivisions. Most of the conflagration's spread and destruction occurred within a week of ignition, as the forward advance of the wildfire mostly stopped after September 7. The wildfire was largely contained in September, though the firebreak was briefly breached in early October. On October 10, the Bastrop County Complex was declared controlled, and the fire was declared extinguished on October 29 after 55 days of burning within the fire perimeter.

Two people were killed by the wildfire, and another 12 people were injured. The fire perimeter encircled an area spanning at least 32,000 acres (12,950 hectares). Homes were destroyed in 10 subdivisions, of which Circle-D County Acres and Tahitian Village sustained the most significant property damage. The wildfire destroyed more homes than any single fire in Texas history by nearly a factor of 10. Around 96% of Bastrop State Park was scorched by the wildfire. Roughly 1.5 million trees across 16,200 acres (6,600 hectares) of forest were either killed directly by the fire or fatally damaged. Despite the severe habitat loss, populations of local herpetofauna were not significantly affected by the fire, though extensive soil erosion was enabled by the loss of groundcover.

== Setting and environmental conditions ==
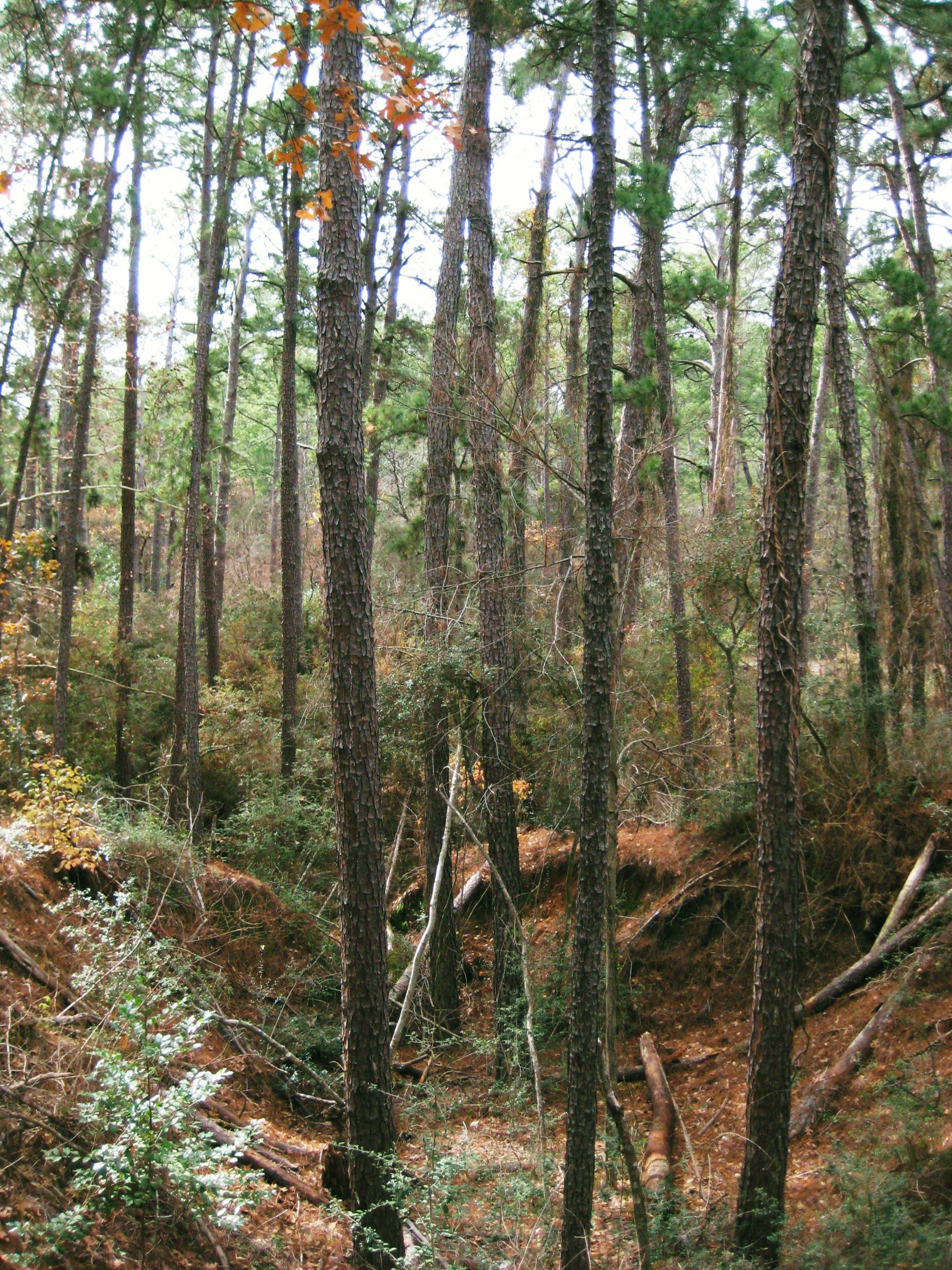
Loblolly pines and understory within Bastrop State Park in 2009

The Bastrop County complex occurred within the Lost Pines Forest of Texas, a region characterized by a loblolly pine (Pinus taeda) canopy, a yaupon (Ilex vomitoria) understory, sandy soils, and a mixed topography of flat terrain and rolling hills. This area is near the city of Bastrop, Texas, which itself is located about 30 mi (48 km) southeast of Austin, the state capital of Texas. Oak trees, Ashe juniper (Juniperus ashei), shrubs, and grasses also comprise the vegetation of the region. The Lost Pines cover a 70 mi^{2} (180 km^{2}) area and are a disjunct population separated from the Piney Woods by 100 mi (160 km) of agricultural land. Historical wildfire behavior in Texas has been strongly influenced by human activities and changes in land use, affecting the makeup and composition of the vegetation impacted by the fire. The prevalence of cattle in Bastrop County between the 1860s and mid-1880s may have led to a reduction in fires in and around what is now Bastrop State Park via the grazing of potential fuels. However, the harsh winter of 1886–1887 brought an end to open-range grazing by 1890; this may have allowed for an increase in wildfires in subsequent decades. Greater use of wildfire suppression after the mid-1940s led to an increase in tree density in the region, further augmented by the concurrent planting of additional loblolly pine trees. The reduction in wildfires after the 1940s – leading to the lowest fire activity since at least 1720 – led to a build-up in vegetation density (and thus potential fuels for a wildfire) to unprecedented levels. In the years leading up to the Bastrop County Complex, the only large wildfire in the area was the Wilderness Ridge Fire in 2009, which burned 1,491 acres (603 hectares). The vegetation in and around Bastrop State Park indicates that no fire before 2011, dating back to at least 1650, matched the severity of the Bastrop County Complex.

An extreme drought characterized by an all-time record lack of precipitation and warmth persisted throughout Texas prior to the wildfire.

Texas endured one of its worst droughts in recorded history throughout much of 2011. The drought began to materialize following a drier than average autumn and winter beginning in 2010, but it worsened to widespread and extreme levels after March 2011. The average precipitation total statewide was 0.29 in (7.4 mm) compared to the 1981–2010 average of 2.18 in (55 mm) in March, making it the state's driest March on record. The period from October 2010 to September 2011 was the driest 12-month period in Texas history, with the statewide average rainfall falling below the previous record set during the 1950s Texas drought by 2.35 in (60 mm). Based on paleoclimate reconstructions, the summer of 2011 may have been the fourth-driest summer in Texas since 996. Temperatures during the summer of 2011 also rose to record highs, with statewide average temperatures from June through August 2011 eclipsing the previous record high by 2 °F; each of the three months was their respective warmest month on record. Additionally, the mean statewide temperatures in those three months were the hottest summer months recorded in any U.S. state on record, topping the record heat set in Oklahoma during the Dust Bowl.

The nearby Tropical Storm Lee induced strong northerly winds over Texas in early September 2011, producing conditions supportive of wildfire ignition and growth.

Dry conditions perpetuated by the drought led to widespread die-offs of trees across central and eastern Texas by the early fall of 2011, and most forests throughout the state were exceptionally dry; 251 of the 254 counties in Texas had bans on outdoor burning in effect in September 2011. The moisture content of all vegetation types within Bastrop County diminished to record lows during the course of the drought, making them increasingly susceptible to combustion. According to the U.S. Drought Monitor, (Note: The U.S. Drought Monitor is a product developed jointly by the National Drought Mitigation Center, the U.S. Department of Agriculture, and the National Oceanic and Atmospheric Administration and documents the spatial extent and severity of drought conditions in the U.S.) the entirety of Bastrop County had remained in exceptional drought – the most severe drought conditions – since the week of May 10, 2011, and had been experiencing at least abnormally dry conditions since at least the week of October 26, 2010. Numerous wildfires occurred across Texas and adjoining states in 2011; more land area was burned in Texas and Oklahoma since official recordkeeping began in 2002. Between November 2010 and September 2011, Texas wildfires engulfed over 3.7 million acres (1.5 million hectares) of land; within the first week of September 2011, 135,000 acres (54,600 hectares) burned.

Amid the exceptional drought in early September 2011, Tropical Storm Lee developed in the Gulf of Mexico and produced northeasterly winds across much of East Texas beginning on September 3; the storm itself was centered over the gulf south of the central Louisiana coast. These winds were further accelerated by the presence of high air pressure over Texas. Temperatures ahead of a cold front concurrently moving east of the Rocky Mountains rose above 100 °F (38 °C) the day before the fire ignited and on the day of ignition, resulting in relative humidity values falling below 20% in the vicinity of Bastrop. Rainfall associated with the tropical storm did not expand west of Interstate 45, allowing the dry conditions in the Bastrop area to persist. Winds decreased over the night of September 3 and into the morning of September 4, but the approach of the cold front into the Bastrop area resulted in the acceleration of winds once more. Around the time of the Bastrop County Complex's initiation on September 4, the distant tropical storm was generating sustained winds of 12–14 mph (19–23 km/h) and wind gusts of 25–31 mph (40–50 km/h) in the Bastrop area. The high temperature on September 4 was 101 °F (38 °C), and the relative humidity bottomed out at 20%. This combination of conditions led the Storm Prediction Center to forecast critical fire weather conditions over southern and central Texas for September 4. Throughout Texas, local fire departments responded to 227 fires on September 4, 57 of which were new fires. The likelihood of a wildfire igniting given the prevailing weather conditions was around 90%.

== Fire progression ==
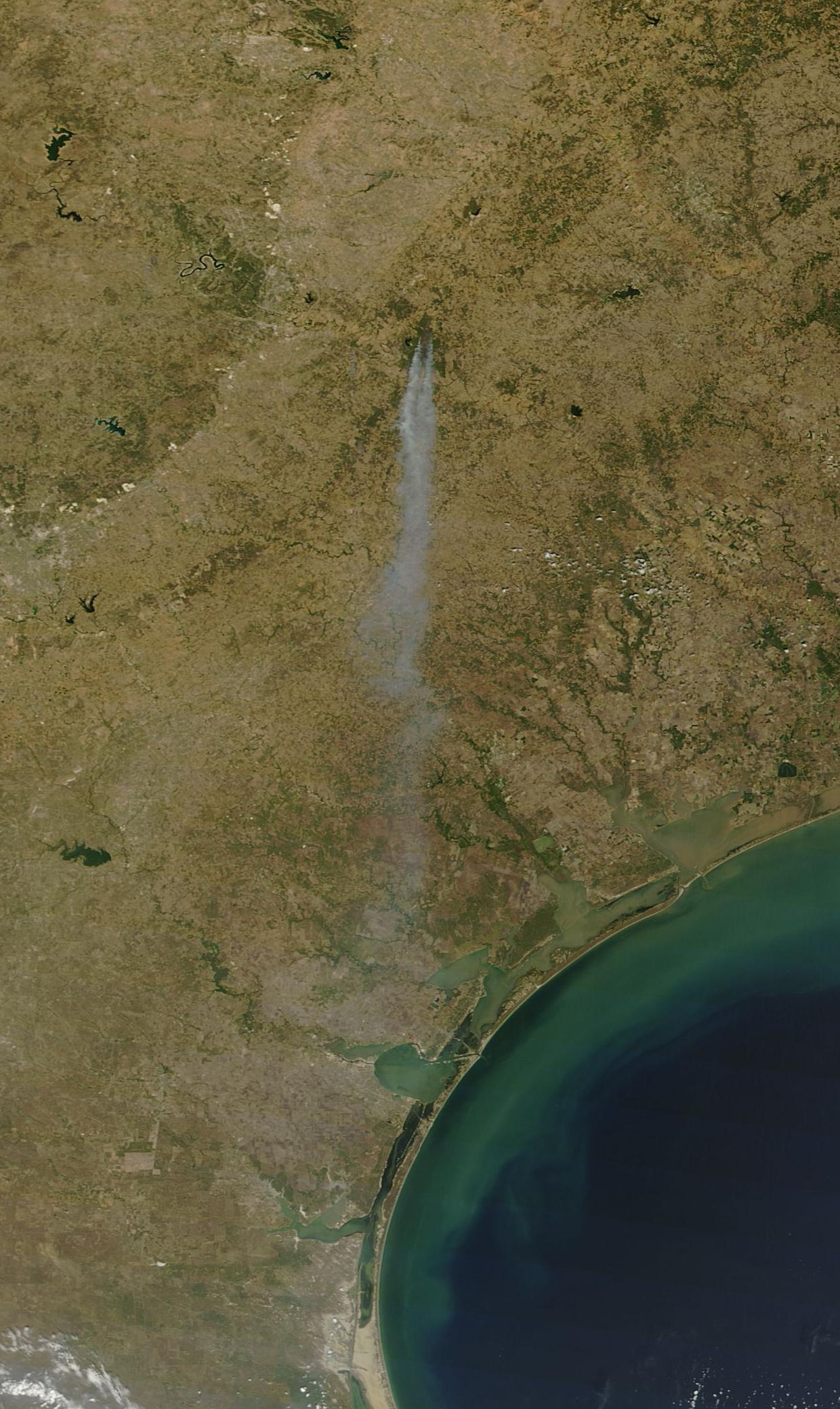
The smoke plume from the wildfire as observed by the MODIS on board the Terra satellite on September 5

The wildfire complex began as three individual fires whose ignitions were reported within three hours on September 4, 2011. The first fire was ignited by fallen power lines near Circle D-KC Estates, Texas, located 16 mi (10 km) northeast of Bastrop. A nearby homeowner called 9-1-1 at 2:20 pm (all times are CDT), reporting the fire. An investigation performed by the Texas Forest Service (TFS) determined a point of origin near 258 Charolais Drive. Strong winds caused a pine tree to snap 8 ft (2.4 m) above the ground, resulting in the upper trunk falling atop power lines and triggering sparks that reached the dry grass and leaf litter below. The first fire grew quickly after ignition; the Bastrop volunteer fire department requested fire suppression equipment from the TFS at 2:25 pm, but determined at 2:33 pm that the blaze was uncontrollable, prompting evacuations. Thirty-two minutes later after the first ignition, a second fire initiated 4 mi (6.4 km) to the north near Schwantz Ranch Road and U.S. Highway 290; the TFS determined that this second ignition was also caused by a tree falling upon power lines. An investigation by Bluebonnet Electric Cooperative, which services the power lines in the region, arrived at similar conclusions for the cause of the fires. Pushed southward by a strong northerly wind, the wildfire crossed Texas State Highway 21 at 3:02 pm. Mike Fisher, the emergency-management coordinator for Bastrop County, formally declared the situation a disaster at that time, authorizing aid from outside of the county. The conflagration subsequently spread into Bastrop State Park and began to encroach upon Texas State Highway 71. The highway's right-of-way formed a pre-existing firebreak spanning 325 ft (99 m) across. Firefighters set dead grass in the highway's median strip to deter expansion of the flames south of the highway, but were unsuccessful; the first fire crossed the highway at 4:07 pm. The two initial fires grew and aggregated into a single wildfire by 5 pm after joining near Cardinal Drive, continuing to spread through Bastrop State Park and across Texas State Highway 71.

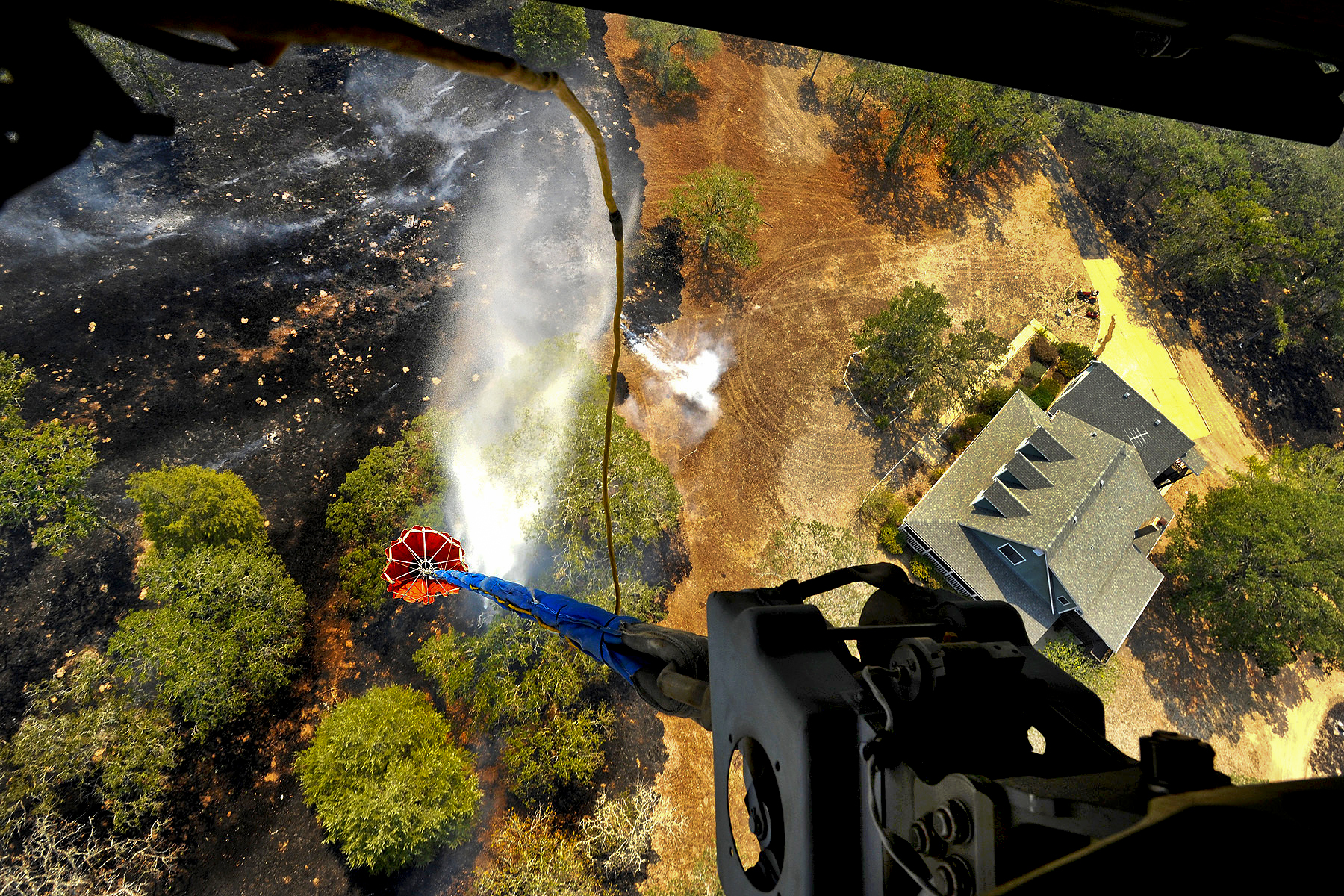
A Bambi bucket on board a CH-47 Chinook helicopter from the Texas Army National Guard being used on part of the fire on September 6

The third individual fire was ignited by a tree contacting a power line south of the highway near Tahitian Drive at 5:16 pm and eventually merged with the larger fire; the complex of wildfires merged into a single wildfire within 48 hours of ignition. During the first hours of the wildfire, the firefront advanced at 5 mph (8.0 km/h) through the pine and yaupon vegetation. High winds carried hot embers far from the firefront, igniting fires as far as 3 mi (4.8 km) away. Fire whirls were also observed along the firefront. In addition to the strong winds, horizontal convective rolls embedded within the wind flow enabled the wildfire to quickly advance along the tops of the forest canopy, resulting in long streaks of intensely burned vegetation. By the end of September 4, the combined wildfire had scorched an area roughly 14 mi (23 km) long and up to 6 mi (9.7 km) wide, covering 14,000 acres (5,660 hectares) of land.

The passage of a cold front ushered in a decrease in temperatures on September 5. The movement of Tropical Storm Lee east away from Texas slackened winds, though gusts remained in the 20–25 mph (32–40 km/h) range. The combination of gusts with continued low relative humidity and strong atmospheric instability perpetuated environmental conditions conducive to large fire growth. The Bastrop County Complex remained uncontained at all heading into the afternoon of September 5, with its advance still unslowed by firefighting efforts. Flames reached the Colorado River and crossed south of the river twice during the day, reducing the ability for firefighters to obtain water. State officials stated on September 5 that the Bastrop County Complex had destroyed 476 homes, setting a record for the most homes destroyed by a single wildfire in Texas. The fire had engulfed over 25,000 acres (10,000 hectares), but its spread north of the Colorado River had slowed. Over 250 firefighters were working on containing the fire's spread, aided by bulldozers to create firebreaks and TFS air tankers.

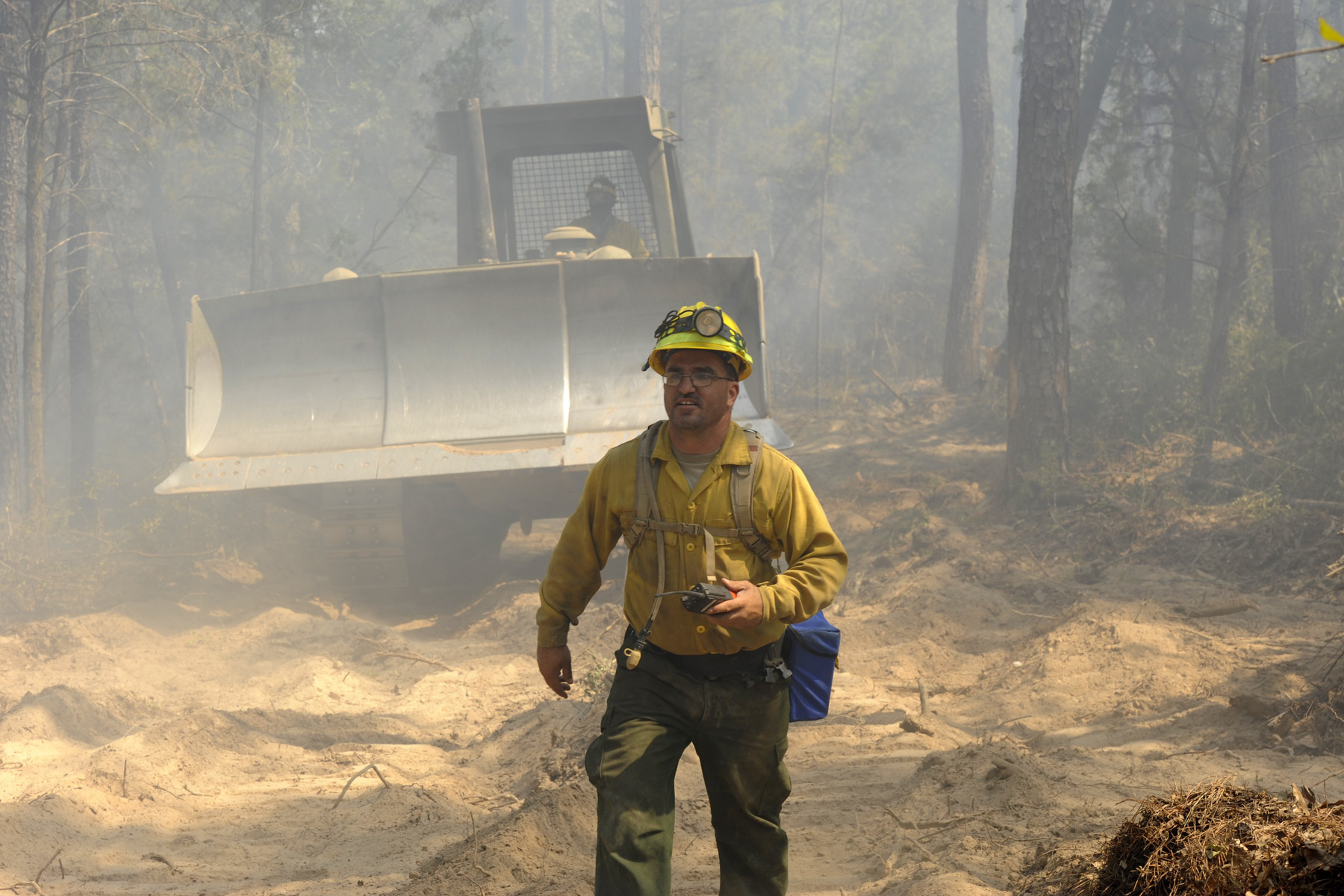
The Texas National Guard bulldozing a firebreak on September 7

The conflagration remained completely uncontained on September 6. The TFS released a statement that day describing the fire's behavior as "unprecedented" and that "no one on the face of this Earth has ever fought fires in these extreme conditions." Considerable progress in containing the fire was made on September 7, with fire containment reaching 30 percent and no additional structures being destroyed. The outward advance of the wildfire was mostly stopped, but burning continued within the pre-existing burn area. The TFS assessed that 785 homes had been destroyed by September 7, but counting the number of destroyed homes increased significantly the following day to 1,386 based on surveys conducted by Bastrop County officials. The wildfire was 50% contained by noon on September 10 and 70% contained by noon on September 12. Dry weather had remained in place over the Bastrop area for nearly two weeks after the wildfire first ignited, but light rain and humid conditions arrived for the first time on September 17, attenuating flare-ups within the burn area; at the time, the fire was 85% contained. After September 22, 18 days after ignition, the wildfire was 95 percent contained. Beneficial rains on September 24–25, including totals as much as 2 in (51 mm) in parts of Bastrop County, allowed firefighters to target hot spots more deeply embedded within the fire perimeter.

The wildfire spread past a firebreak on October 4 towards the northern portions of the previous burn scar, burning 309 acres (125 hectares) of land including parts of Griffith League Ranch. This extension of the Bastrop County Complex was called the Old Potato Road fire and was fully contained on October 10. The Bastrop County Complex was declared controlled on October 10. However, flare-ups within the burn area continued until October 29, when the fire was completely extinguished. In total, the wildfire lasted for 55 days.

Another fire, called the Union Chapel Fire, began on the afternoon of September 5 near Cedar Creek High School some 18 mi (29 km) to the west of the Bastrop County Complex. Though a discrete fire, TFS operations considered the Union Chapel Fire a part of the Bastrop County Complex. The fire consumed 912 acres (369 hectares) and destroyed 25 homes and two businesses, prompting the evacuation of 200 people, but was 90% contained by September 8.

== Firefighting efforts ==
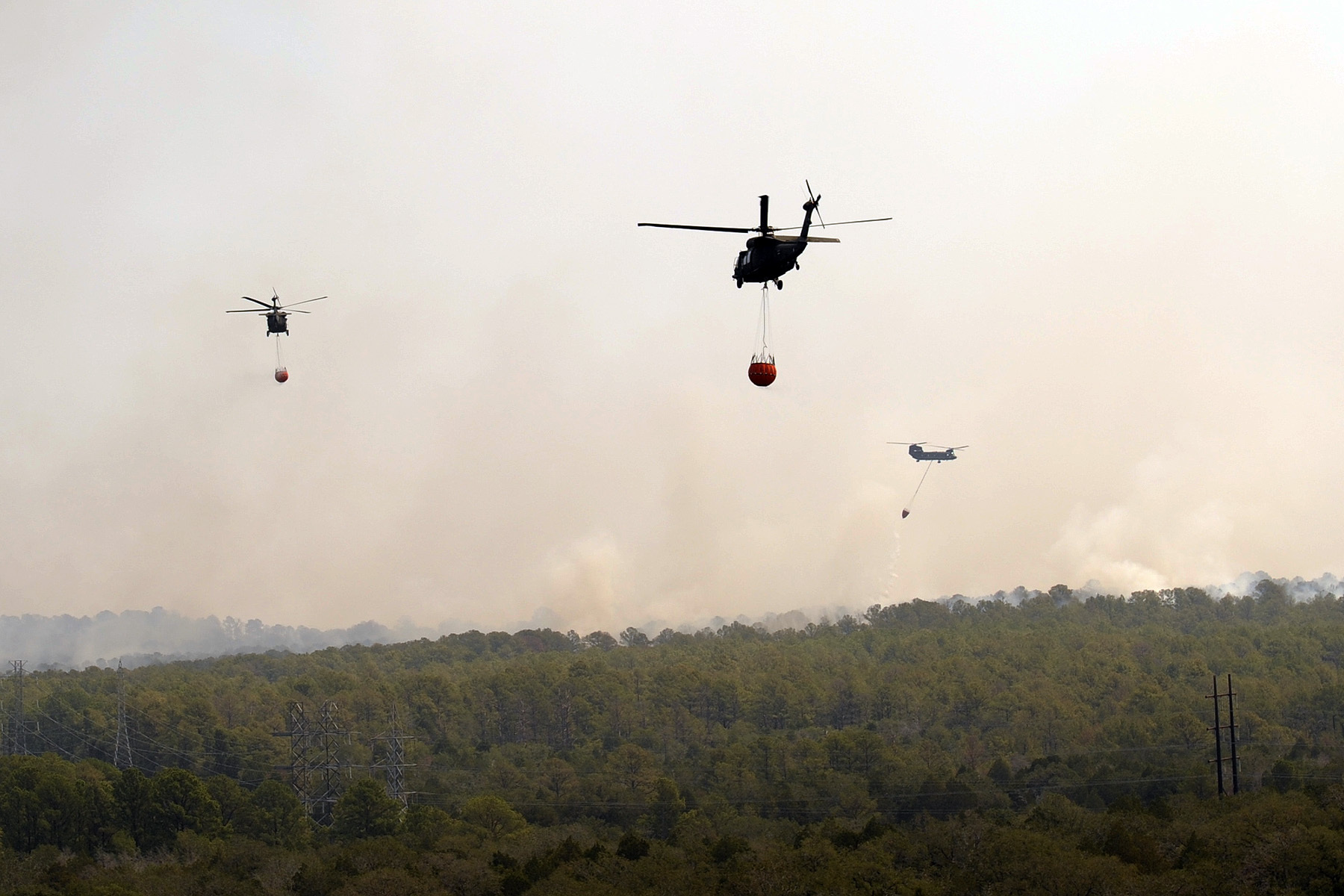
Around 2.3 million gallons (8.7 million liters) of water and fire retardant were dropped on fires in Bastrop County in September 2011.

More than 30 airplanes and helicopters from the Texas National Guard and TFS were involved in aerial firefighting efforts. Within the first week of the fire, aircraft performed 1,647 drops of water or fire retardant on the fire. Combined with the nearby Union Chapel Fire, 2,367 drops of water or fire retardant were performed in September 2011, equivalent to 2.3 million gallons (8.7 million liters) of fire suppression payload. The most intense aerial firefighting operations occurred on September 6. Tanker 910 – a converted McDonnell Douglas DC-10 airtanker – was brought to Austin–Bergstrom International Airport for use in fighting the fire, but was ultimately unneeded by the time the requisite fire retardant mixing facility was established at the airport. The converted DC-10 and four Lockheed C-130 Hercules tankers remained on standby at the airport for other deployments after the Bastrop Fire diminished. Firefighting crews from 30 agencies assisted in combating the wildfire in its first days. On September 9, 676 personnel were working on fire, the most of any day during the wildfire's spread. In addition to the aerial firefighting efforts, 27 bulldozers and 47 pumpers were deployed to help attack the fire. One fire engine was engulfed by the flames on September 4; the crew was rescued, but the truck melted in the fire. The Texas Intrastate Fire Mutual Aid System mobilized 15 "strike teams" composed of 192 personnel to the Bastrop County Complex Fire. FEMA authorized eight fire-management assistance grants for Texas wildfires concurrent with the Bastrop County Complex, subsidizing firefighting equipment. On September 25, the fire incident command transitioned its response from type 1 to type 3 as the wildfire became increasingly controlled. (Note: Within the Incident Command System, types describe the complexity and breadth of the response to incidents, including wildfires. A type 1 response indicates the use of national resources for major incidents. A type 3 response is used for extended fire suppression efforts and implies a more localized response.)

== Closures and evacuations ==
The first evacuations of homes began within 20 minutes of the first fire being reported on September 4. The evacuation of Bastrop State Park was ordered at 3:16 pm on September 4, while evacuation of neighborhoods south of Texas State Highway 71 began around 3:30 pm that day, less than an hour before the fire crossed the highway. Buescher State Park was also closed on September 4, but reopened on September 20 without the fire entering the extent of the park. Twenty subdivisions were subject to evacuations during the spread of the fire, including mandatory evacuation orders, accounting for some 5,000 people. Some residents were allowed to examine the hardest-hit neighborhoods for the first time on September 8. A staggered re-entry of residents to additional evacuated subdivisions began on September 12 and continued through September 15 as the wildfire subsided. Bastrop Middle School and the First Baptist Church in Smithville, Texas, were designated as shelters for wildfire evacuees. Volunteers rescued 160 animals from the Bastrop Animal Shelter, evacuating them to Austin. Bastrop Independent School District and Smithville Independent School District closed their schools on September 6 and resumed classes on September 12; the school closures also resulted in cancellations of football and volleyball events for area schools. Bluebonnet Electric Cooperative relocated around 50 of its workers from its Bastrop headquarters to Giddings, Texas, on the night of September 4 to continue monitoring the electric grid. Texas State Highway 71 was closed during the fire and reopened at 8:00 a.m. CDT on September 10. Texas State Highway 21 was also closed but reopened on September 12. The breach of the firebreak on October 4 prompted additional road closures and the evacuations of 25–30 homes.

== Impact and effects ==
Earth Observing-1 imagery of the burn scar on September 12, 2011

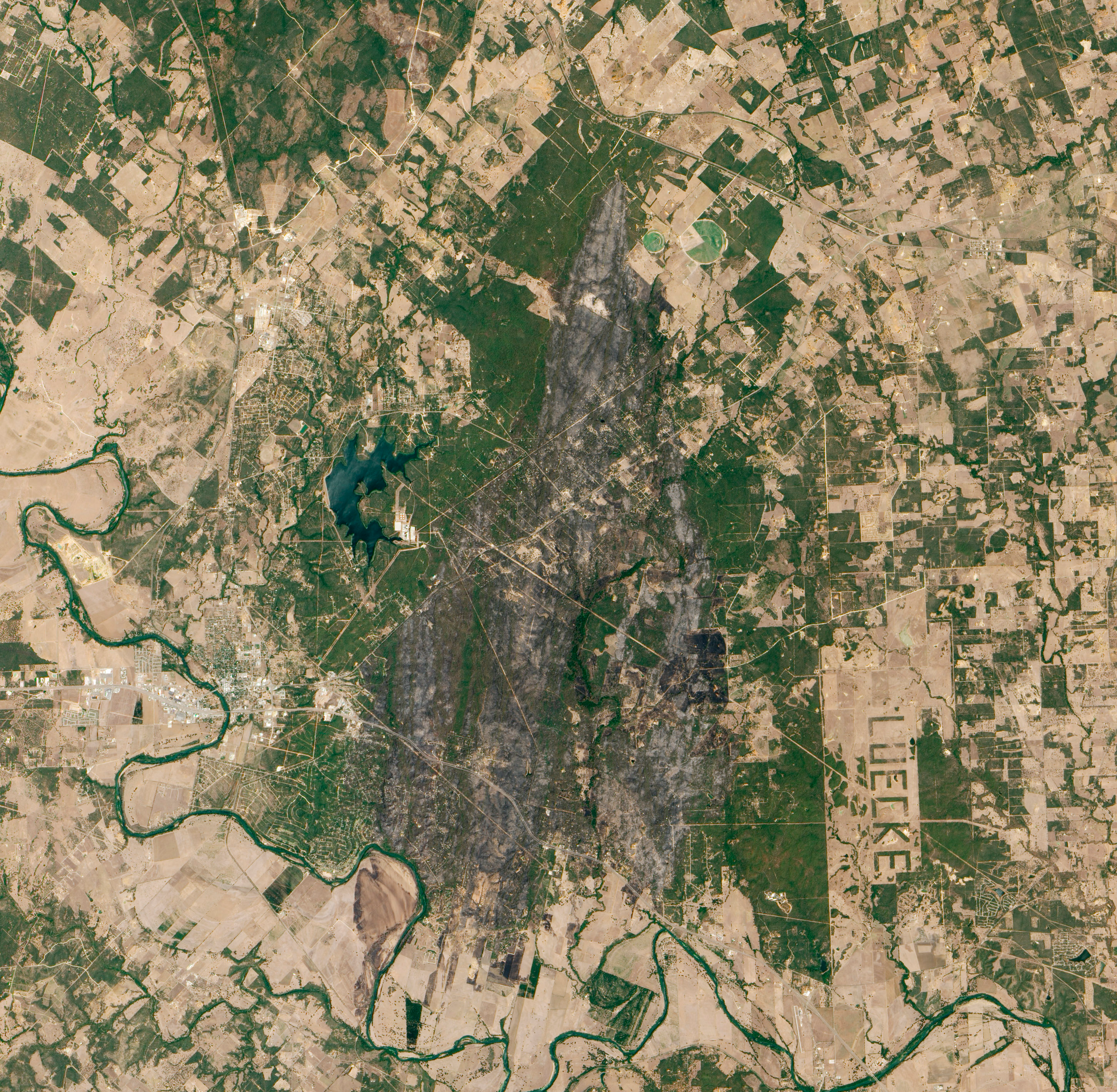
True color depiction

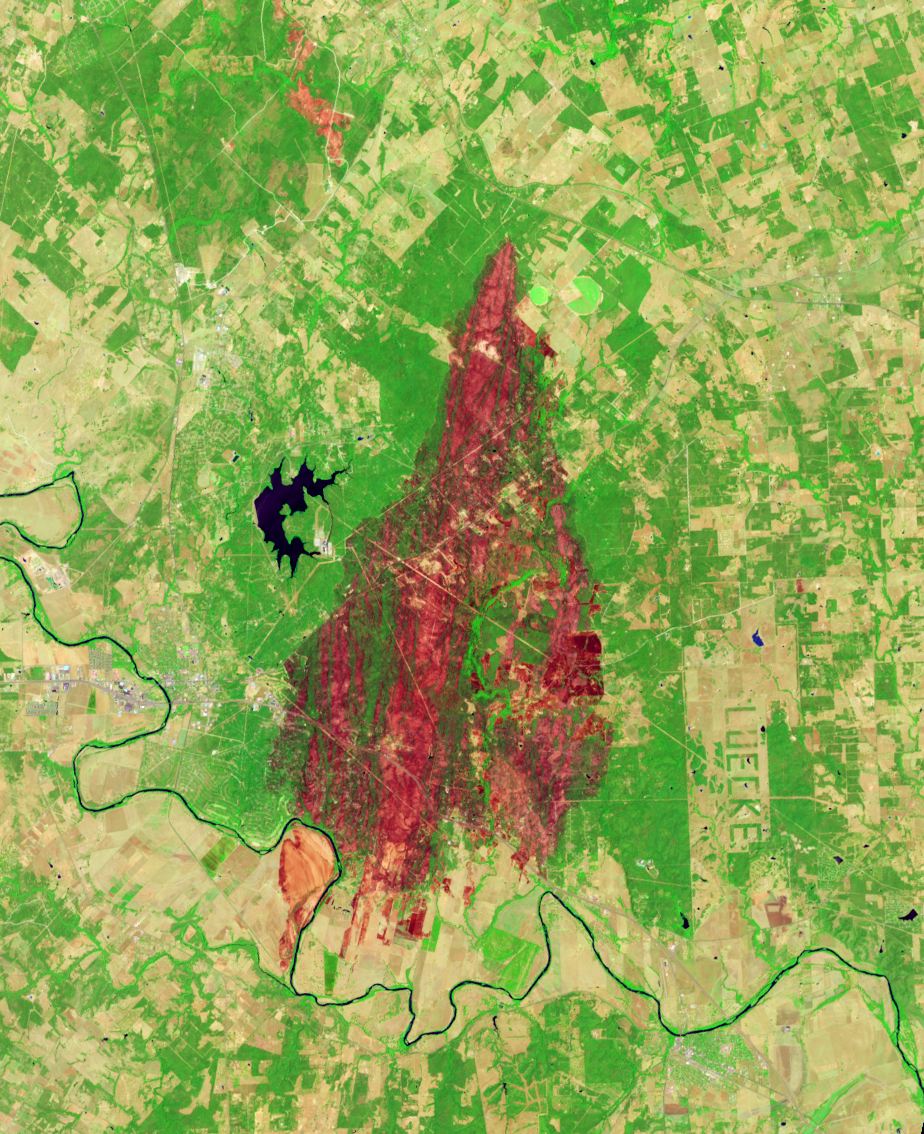
False color depiction

The conflagration consumed at least 32,000 acres (12,950 hectares) of land, burning across subdivisions within the wildland–urban interface, unmanaged private land, and much of Bastrop State Park. Two people were killed and 12 people were injured. The fire destroyed 1,660 homes and 36 businesses, accounting for about 59.4% of the structures caught within the wildfire's burn perimeter. Most of the destroyed structures were burned by the wildfire within the first three days of ignition. In some cases, homes burned so intensely that their foundations ruptured. Another 1,091 homes were saved by firefighting efforts. Homes were destroyed in 10 subdivisions, with the greatest losses occurring in Circle-D County Acres and Tahitian Village subdivisions. Structures were destroyed in five incorporated and unincorporated communities: Bastrop, Cedar Creek, McDade, Paige, and Smithville. Most of the structures destroyed were in the Bastrop area. Based on the number of homes destroyed, the Bastrop County Complex was the most destructive in Texas history and third-most destructive in U.S. history, but accounting for fires for which official counts of damage do not exist, the fire may have been the sixth-most destructive in U.S. history. The previous record for the most homes destroyed by a single fire in Texas was 168, set by the Possum Kingdom fire in April 2011. The Insurance Council of Texas estimated that the fire inflicted $325 million in insured losses, making the Bastrop County Complex the costliest wildfire in Texas history and among the costliest in U.S. history. The estimated toll exceeded the estimated losses statewide from fires in 2009 – the costliest year for wildfires in the state before 2011. Accounting for the populations of counties in which destructive wildfires have occurred, the Bastrop County complex may have at the time been the costliest conflagration per capita in the wildland–urban interface in U.S. history based on an estimated loss of $209.3 million as estimated by the Bastrop Tax Appraisal District. Power outages caused or prompted by the fire affected 3,800 homes; all power was restored by September 27.

The two people killed by the fire were found on September 6, 2011, after law enforcement and search crews combed through burned neighborhoods. One person was found near Smithville and the other near Paige; both of the fatalities were in neighborhoods that had been evacuated. Urban Search and Rescue Texas Task Force 1 was later deployed to the area to search for additional victims.

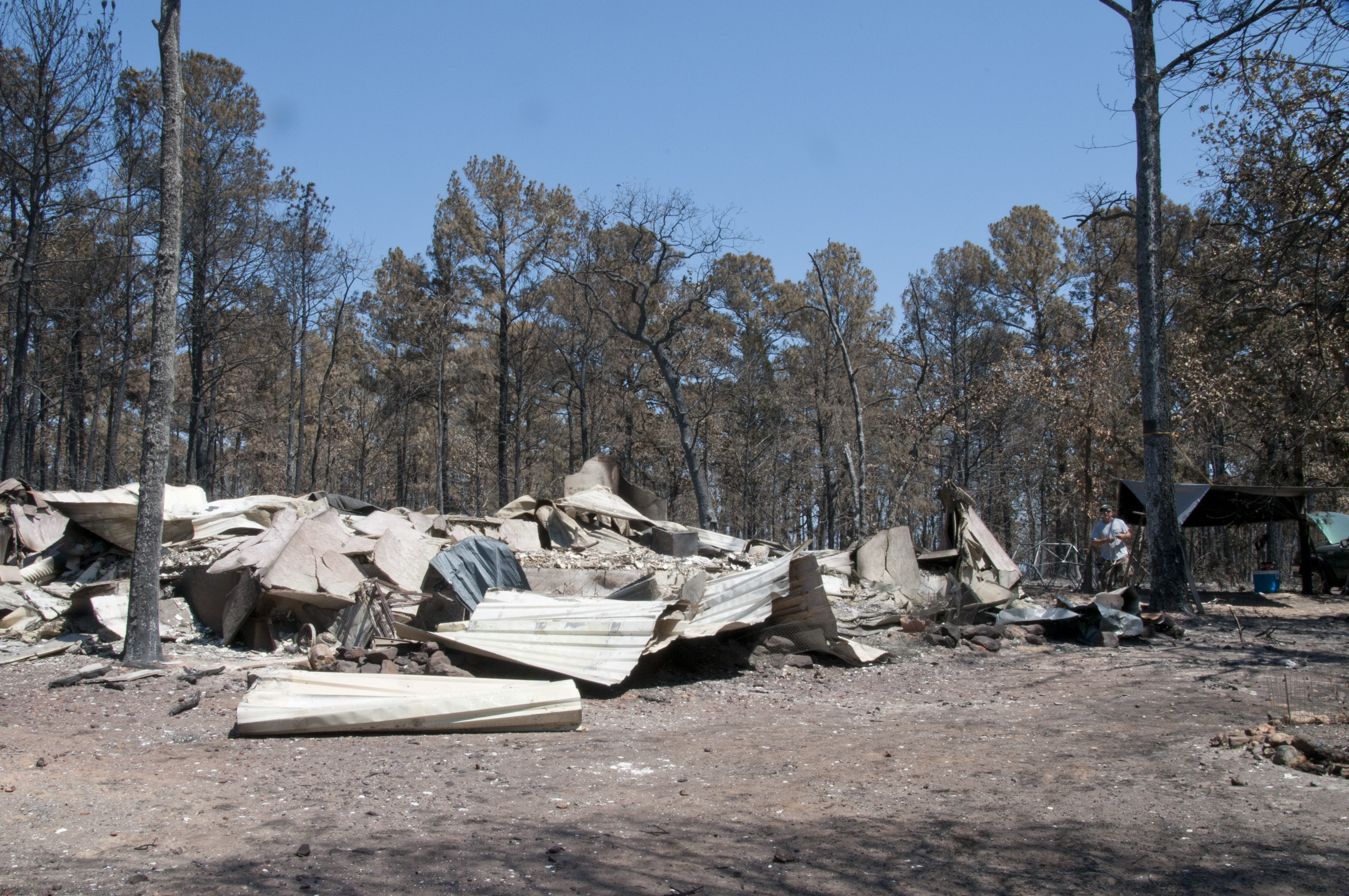
The Bastrop County Complex Fire destroyed more homes than any other wildfire in Texas history.

The Bastrop County Complex affected 96% of Bastrop State Park, leaving only around 100 acres (40 hectares) untouched. Some 70% of the park was severely burned. The only unburned areas were the park's golf course, the curtilage around structures, and areas subjected to prescribed fires in February 2011. Two scenic overlook buildings within the park built in the 1930s, among other historic structures, were destroyed. The regional state parks office near Bastrop State Park was also destroyed by the fire. However, firefighters successfully prevented the wildfire from damaging many other cabins and structures in the park built by the Civilian Conservation Corps. Vegetation in the park suffered extensively, leading to the loss of around 70 percent of canopy trees and 90–92 percent of understory vegetation. The elimination of groundcover by the fire enabled extensive soil erosion within the park following heavy rainfall in January 2012, damaging archeological sites including those dating back to the Paleo-Indians.

The fire also spread across 39% of the Lost Pines ecoregion. Most of the habitat of the endangered Houston toad (Anaxyrus houstonensis) was destroyed by the wildfire. Their population was not strongly affected by the habitat loss in subsequent years, though the fire may have pushed their populations beyond their typical range within Bastrop County. Similarly, the populations of other native amphibians and reptiles – namely the six-lined racerunner (Cnemidophorus sexlineatus), southern prairie lizard (Sceloporus consobrinus), and Hurter's spadefoot toad (Scaphiopus hurteri) – did not decrease as a result of the fire. Riparian forests – common nesting habitats for birds – remained largely intact in the fire.

Approximately 1.5 million trees were either killed by the fire or assessed by the TFS as being "alive but likely to die soon". More than 16,200 acres (6,600 hectares) of forest burned in the wildfire, and over 24 million ft^{3} (680,000 m^{3}) of timber were either destroyed or irreparably damaged, representing 78% of trees in the areas affected by the fire. The fire burned unevenly, leaving some areas lightly scorched, while burning other areas so thoroughly that nutrients were purged from the underlying soil. The strong winds that sparked the fire carried ashes and embers to great distances. Softball-sized aggregations of charred pine trees were found in Rosanky, Texas, 15 mi (24 km) south of the Colorado River.

== Reaction ==
=== Political response ===
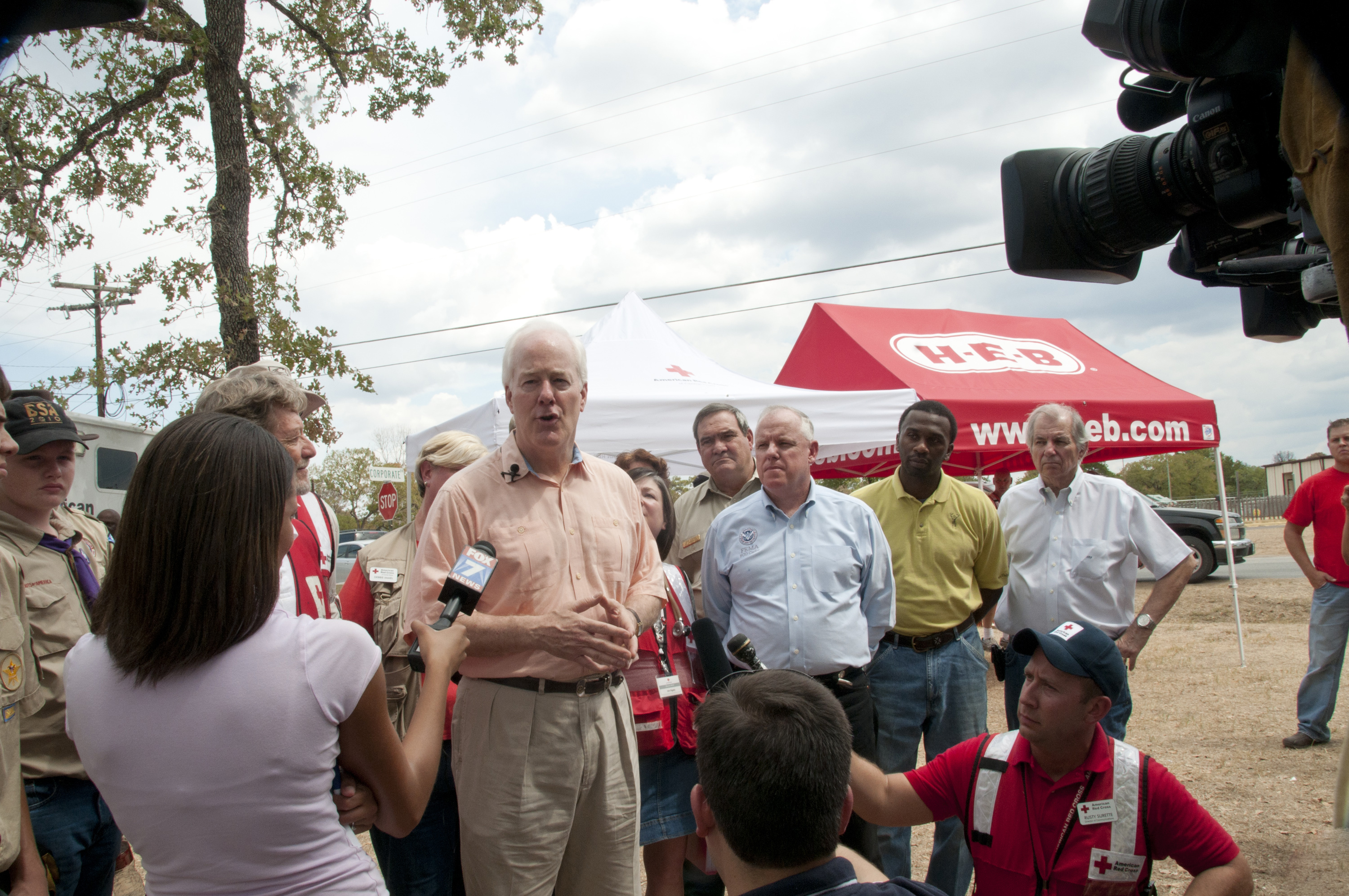
Senator John Cornyn and FEMA Federal Coordinating Officer Kevin L. Hannes holding a press conference on September 17, 2011

In response to the wildfire, Governor of Texas Rick Perry forwent his presidential campaign stop in South Carolina and returned home on Tuesday, September 6, to "address the public and organize requests for more federal aid". Perry and the Texas Legislature drew criticism over their roles in substantial budget cuts to the Texas Forest Service and volunteer fire departments, both of which the state relies heavily upon for combating wildfires. Mario Gallegos, Jim Dunnam, Kirk Watson, the Center for Public Policy Priorities and others opined that these budget cuts exacerbated conditions. Perry criticized the Obama administration for delays in responding to requests made to FEMA for relief aid.

On September 7, 2011, President Barack Obama personally telephoned Perry to discuss the fires. That same day, the White House issued a formal statement, saying, "Over the last several days, at the request of the Governor, the Administration has granted eight Fire Management Assistance Grants, making federal funds available to reimburse eligible costs associated with efforts to combat the fires. FEMA is actively working with state and local officials to conduct damage assessments and to identify areas where additional federal assistance may be warranted."

=== Community and social media efforts ===
Members of the community were noted for voluntarily working to save several homes from destruction by the wildfire. On September 7, a Facebook page entitled Bastrop Fire – Adopt a Family was created to help match up homeless victims with those willing to help house them or provide other assistance. Local musicians and organizations based in nearby Austin, Texas, organized a benefit concert entitled "Fire Relief: The Concert for Central Texas" to raise money for victims of the Bastrop fire. The concert was hosted by Kyle Chandler at the Frank Erwin Center in Austin on October 17 and featured several musicians, including Christopher Cross, the Dixie Chicks, and Willie Nelson, raising over $500,000.

On September 27, 2011, the Bastrop County Long Term Recovery Team (BCLTRT) was formed as a volunteer organization of community members, eventually becoming a 501(c)(3) organization in February 2012. The BCLTRT helped rebuild 133 homes in Bastrop County destroyed by both the Bastrop County Complex Fire and subsequent disasters, with additional funding from the American Red Cross and the Salvation Army.

In the aftermath of the wildfire, students at Texas A&M University formed Aggie Wildfire Relief to raise funds for wildfire recovery. The organization started a "Wear White, Wave Maroon" campaign for a home football game against Baylor University on October 15, 2011, raising over $16,000 from the sales of white T-shirts and maroon towels for donations towards the American Red Cross and the Texas Wildfire Relief Fund.

== Aftermath ==
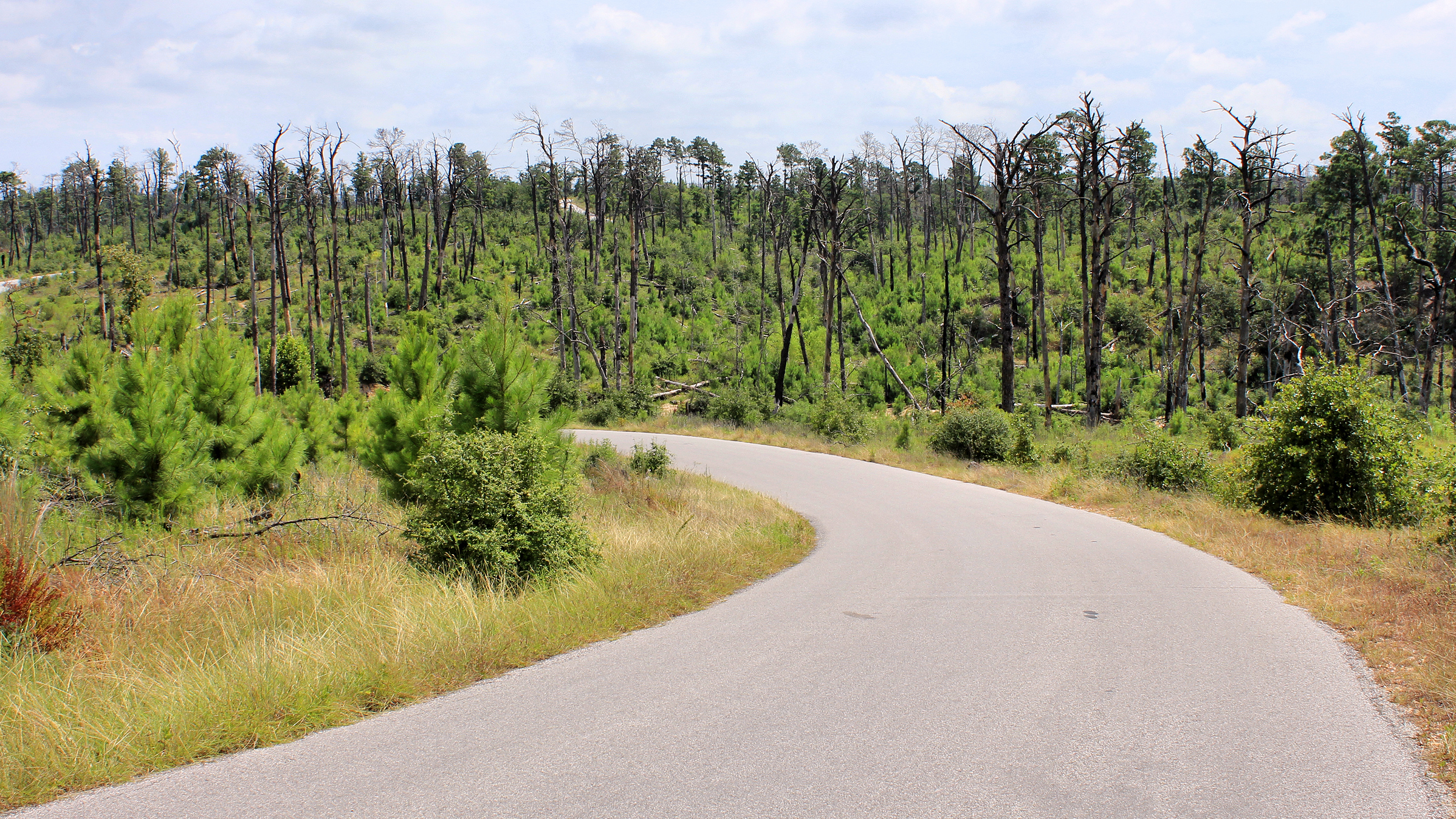
Lolloby pine growth in Bastrop State Park in 2015

On September 9, 2011, President Obama granted a disaster declaration requested by Texas Lieutenant Governor David Dewhurst, authorizing around $16.1 million in federal assistance for individuals in Bastrop County affected by the wildfire. The grant followed preliminary assessments conducted by four FEMA teams of the damage. The government of Bastrop County anticipated that post-fire cleanup would cost $25 million, with FEMA funding $19 million. The destruction of property led to five years of reduced property tax revenue for local government entities and services. Bastrop County established the Lost Pines Recovery Team in the aftermath of the wildfire to assess the state of the area's natural resources and devise and disseminate best management practices for those resources. The county government planned the removal of 521,000 yd^{3} (398,000 m^{3}) of potentially hazardous tree debris, of which 440,000 yd^{3} (336,000 m^{3}) were removed by April 2012. An additional 65,000 yd^{3} (50,000 m^{3}) of construction and demolition debris were also removed by the county. Bluebonnet Electric Cooperative replaced 1,223 burned poles in the fire perimeter and added 61 mi (98 km) of electrical wire for $7.1 million.

Vegetation in Bastrop State Park began to regrow after the fire. Recovery efforts were costly, with erosion control costing at least three times the park's annual budget and loblolly pine replanting costing at least seven times the park's annual budget. The park partially reopened on December 2, 2011, but closed again the next month following heavy rainfall. After additional park rehabilitation projects were completed, most hiking trails, camping areas, and cabins in the park reopened to the public.

Several lawsuits were filed against private companies concerning the inadequate pruning of trees near power lines. A class-action lawsuit filed against the Asplundh Tree Expert Company and Bluebonnet Electric Cooperative was dismissed in 2015. The Bastrop County government, Bastrop County Emergency Services District No. 2, Bastrop Independent School District, and Smithville Independent School District filed a lawsuit against Asplundh on April 1, 2016, alleging that the defendant failed to sufficiently prune trees that ultimately damaged power lines and sparked the fires while being aware of the associated risk given the prevailing weather conditions. A third lawsuit involving the same parties was filed in 2018 and reached a $5 million settlement in 2020.

== See also ==
- Hidden Pines Fire – wildfire in Bastrop County in 2015
- Camp Fire (2018) – destructive wildland–urban interface fire in California
