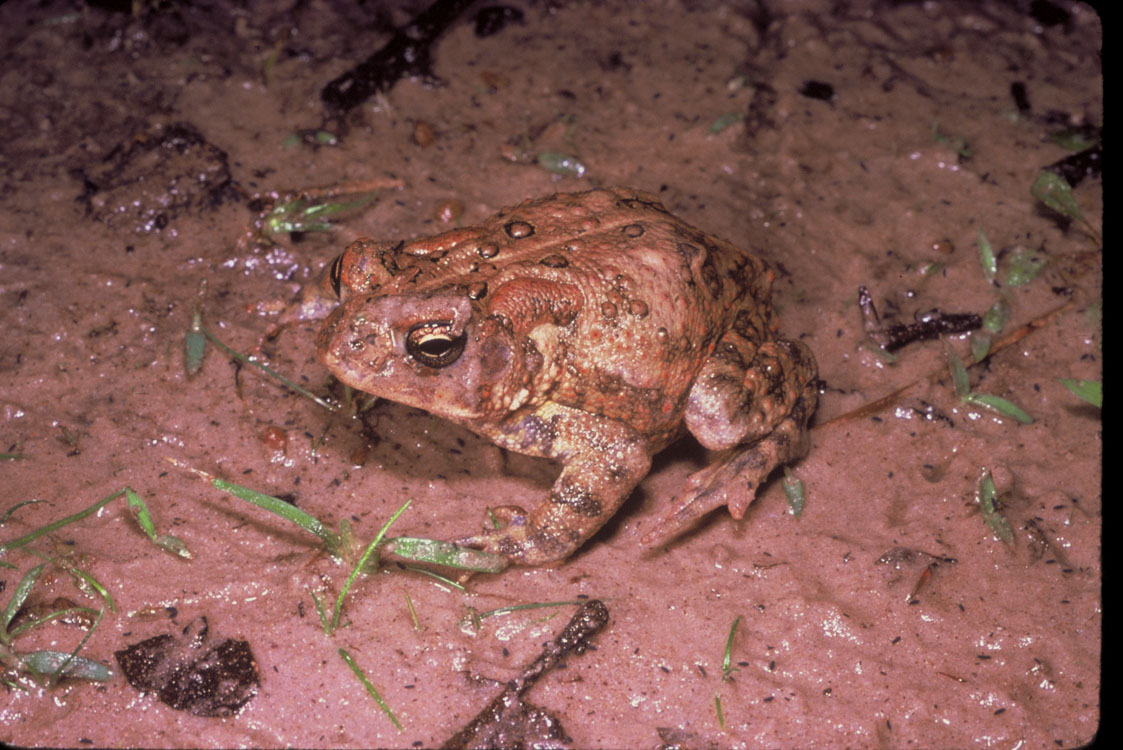

Conservation status
- Critically Endangered (IUCN 3.1)

- Endangered (ESA)

Scientific classification
- Kingdom: Animalia
- Phylum: Chordata
- Class: Amphibia
- Order: Anura
- Family: Bufonidae
- Genus: Anaxyrus
- Species: A. houstonensis

Binomial name
- Anaxyrus houstonensis (Sanders, 1953)

Synonyms
- Bufo houstonensis Sanders, 1953

= Houston toad =

Species of amphibian endemic to Texas, US

The Houston toad (Anaxyrus houstonensis), formerly Bufo houstonensis, is an endangered species of amphibian that is endemic to Texas in the United States. This toad was discovered in the late 1940s and named in 1953. It was among the first amphibians added to the United States List of Endangered Native Fish and Wildlife and is currently protected by the Endangered Species Act of 1973 as an endangered species. The Houston toad was placed as "endangered" on the IUCN Red List of Threatened Species from 1986 to 2022, and has worsened to "critically endangered" since then, with fewer than 250 mature individuals believed to remain in the wild as of 2021. Their kind is threatened every day as they continue to suffer from a loss of habitat and extreme drought. Their typical life expectancy is at least 3 years but it may exceed this number.

== Description ==
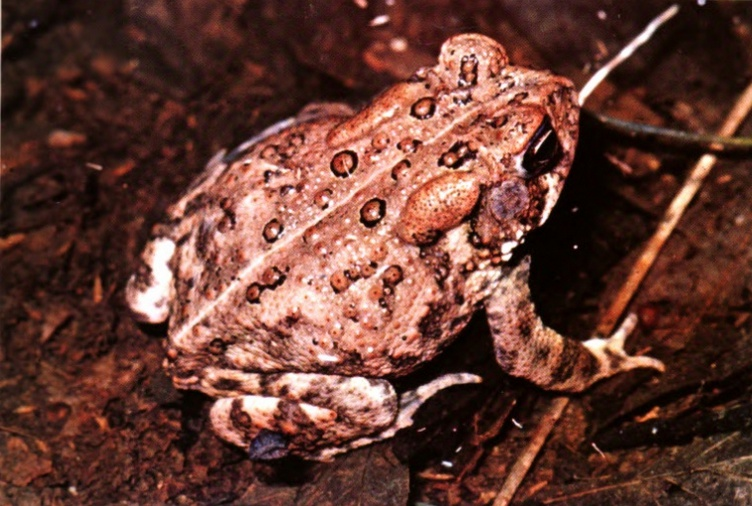
Typical brown speckled back on the Houston toad

The female Houston toad can grow to be 52–88 millimetres (2.0–3.5 in) (snout to vent) when mature and are typically larger and bulkier than males. Male toads are commonly 45–70 millimetres (1.8–2.8 in) long. Although generally brown and speckled, their color can range from black to purplish gray, sometimes with green patches. Their underbelly can be mottled and cream colored and each frog must have at least one brown spot on their pectoral region. Male toads have a dark throat. Tadpoles are distinguished by their heavily pigmented top 75% of their bodies.

The toads typically live 2–3 years and create burrows for protection from the cold in the winter and the hot, dry conditions of the summer. These toads are nocturnal and feed on insects and small invertebrates. During the winter the toads dig themselves into loose soil and go through a period of hibernation.

Toadlets are typically all black and completely develop and go through metamorphosis over the course of 60 days. They are more likely to fall victim to predation by animals and birds and desiccation from the hot dry Texas environment. These tiny toads find themselves seeing shelter under logs, leaves and a various amount of cover objects in the woods to gain protection because they are unable to burrow like adult toads.

They move by making short hops. Since they cannot usually outrun their predators such as snakes, turtles, large birds, raccoons, and other frogs, the toads have developed coloration and rough skin to camouflage themselves. Their skin also secretes chemicals through the parotid glands that are distasteful, and sometimes poisonous, to predators. In addition to protecting the Houston Toad from being eaten, some of these chemicals have proven useful medicines to treat heart and nervous disorders in humans.

== Contribution ==
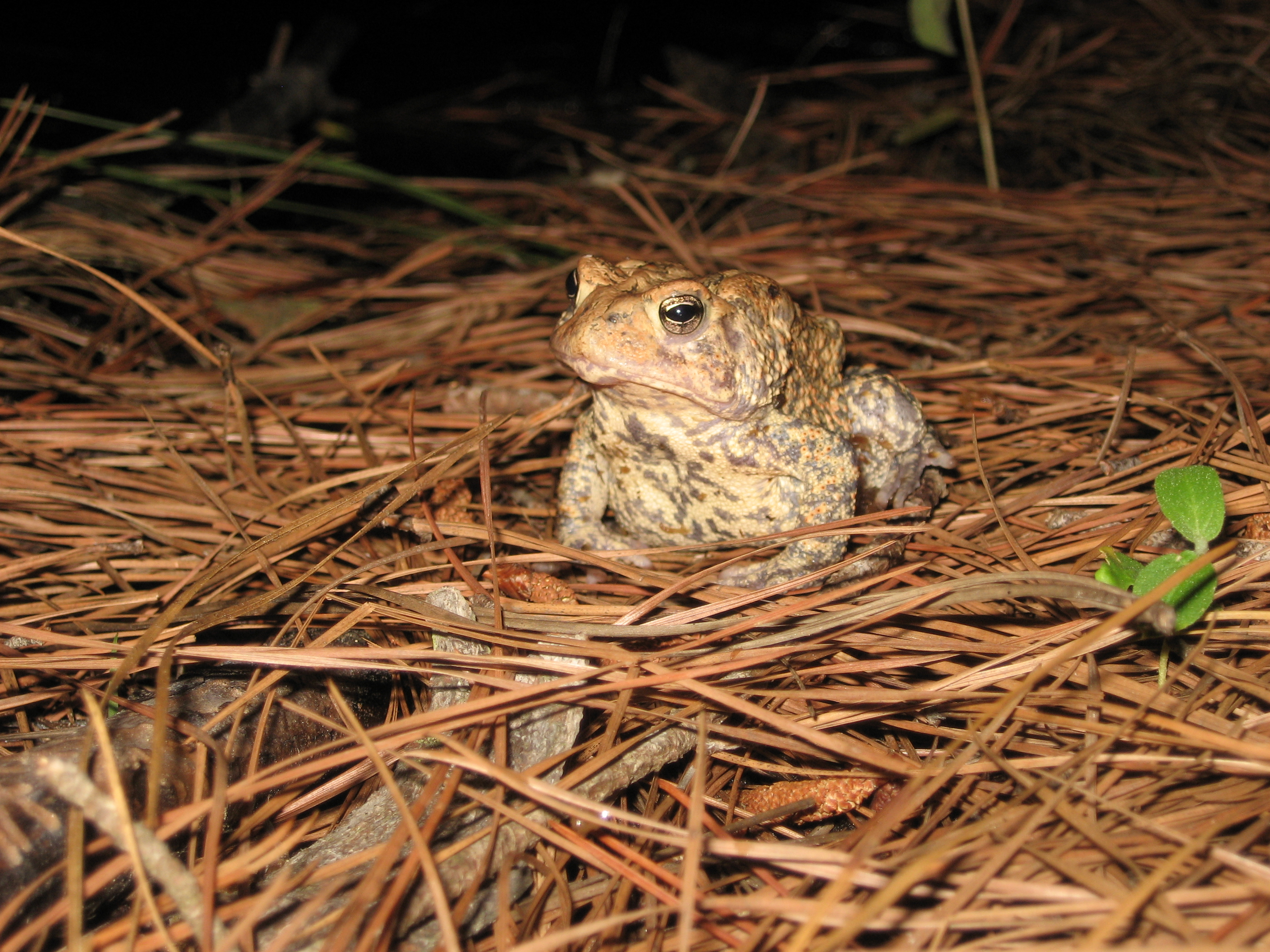
A Houston toad active at night

The Houston toad contains toxins that are vital in the pharmaceutical realm. A variety of medical treatments are derived from the active ingredients found in the Houston Toad's toxins. The Houston toad secretes serotonin and alkaloids, some of which humans use in order to treat certain neurological and heart diseases. The toad also has alkaloids which have the ability to relieve pain and may even be stronger than morphine.

These toads also help stabilize the ecosystems by ensuring that the insect population is low. They are also a food source for animals such as spiders, raccoons, turtles, snakes, owls, as well as fire ants. Unfortunately, due to the low population size of the Houston toad it is difficult for scientists to be sure of the effects that the Houston toad has on the ecosystem.

== Food habits ==
Adult Houston toads' main food source is insects and small invertebrates. Their diet consists of ground beetles as well as occasional small toads and ants. In order to capture their prey they either sit-and-wait or they utilize active search. The toad will create a little depression in the ground using its hind legs to conduct the first method. The toad will then wait in the divet for movement in the surrounding areas and then will attack and jump at the prey when movement is detected. These depressions are temporary; new ones are created many times each day.

Tadpoles are unable to hunt like adult Houston toads so they feed on pollen and the jelly envelope left behind by freshly hatched tadpoles. They also tend to feed on algae which can be found on leaves.

When the weather is hot in the summer or it is brittle and cold in the winter, toads can bury themselves in and under sand in order to hibernate or estivate for protection from extreme temperatures.

== Reproduction ==
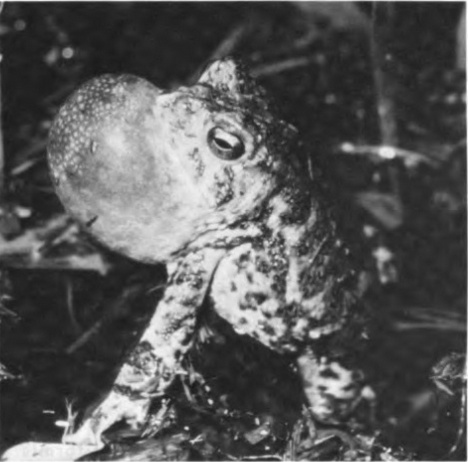
Houston toad calling to attract its mate

These toads are active during the daytime throughout the majority of the year. During breeding season Houston toads are active throughout the day and the night, but primarily at night. Reproduction most commonly occurs during late February but can begin as early as the end of January up until the end of June. Small isolated pools and ponds are the toad's main breeding ground. Depending on rain, breeding may occur twice in one year - in early spring and again in early summer. The early breeding period starts when the 24 hour period the day before has not gotten below 14° Celsius (57.2° Fahrenheit). During these months, the male emits a high clear trill by distending a vocal sac on its throat, in hopes of attracting a mate ten minutes before sunset while in their burrows. After this ten minute period a male will move into a breeding area during the times of sunset to midnight where there he will then call out another high pitched call. This call is similar to a sound of a small bell. A female will choose a male based on certain characteristics of his call. After the female toads arrive, hours after sunset, they will select their mate and the male will remain attached to the female for the next 6 hours. The female will proceed to lay several thousand eggs in long single-egg strands that are fertilized externally by the male as they are laid. Each individual egg has less than one percent chance of survival. The eggs hatch within seven days and tadpoles take between 15 and 100 days to turn into little toads. The toadlets then leave the breeding pond and begin to forage for prey such as ants, beetles and moths. After 1 year, males reach sexual maturity, however it can take 1–2 years for females. Males generally breed for two seasons.

== Geographic range ==
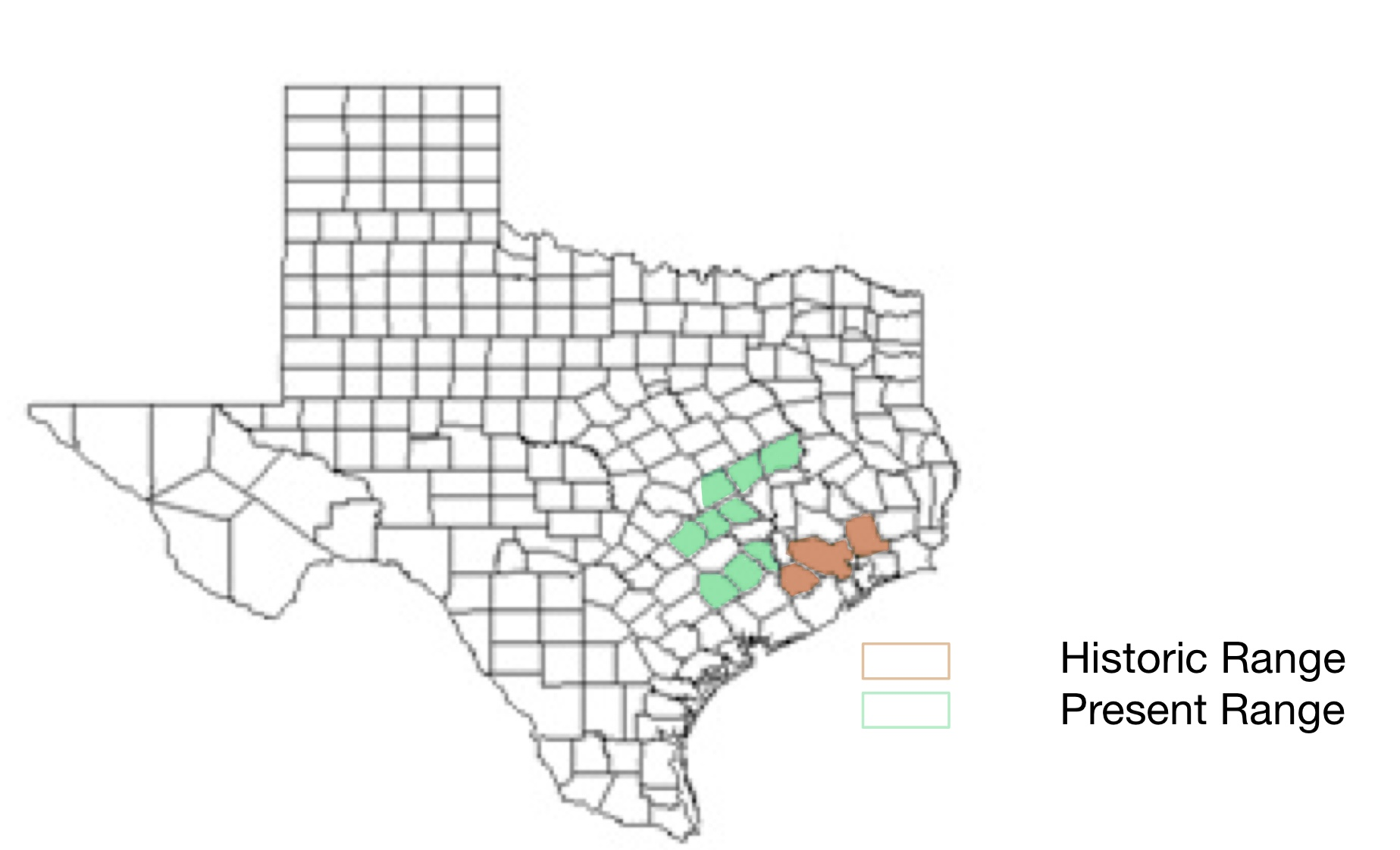
Houston Toad Distribution Map

It has been determined that the Houston toad resides in a niche area of southeastern Texas. The Houston toad has never been found north of Burleson County, south of Fort Bend County, east of Liberty County, or west of Bastrop County since its discovery in 1953. The Houston Toad today lives exclusively in pine and oak woodlands and savanna with forbs and bunchgrasses present in open areas. The Houston toad can be found in a large variety of counties such as sections of Austin, Bastrop, Burleson, Colorado, Lee, Leon, Lavaca, Milam and Robertson. All of these counties are included in the Houston toad Safe Harbor Agreement.

== Habitat ==
=== General habitat ===
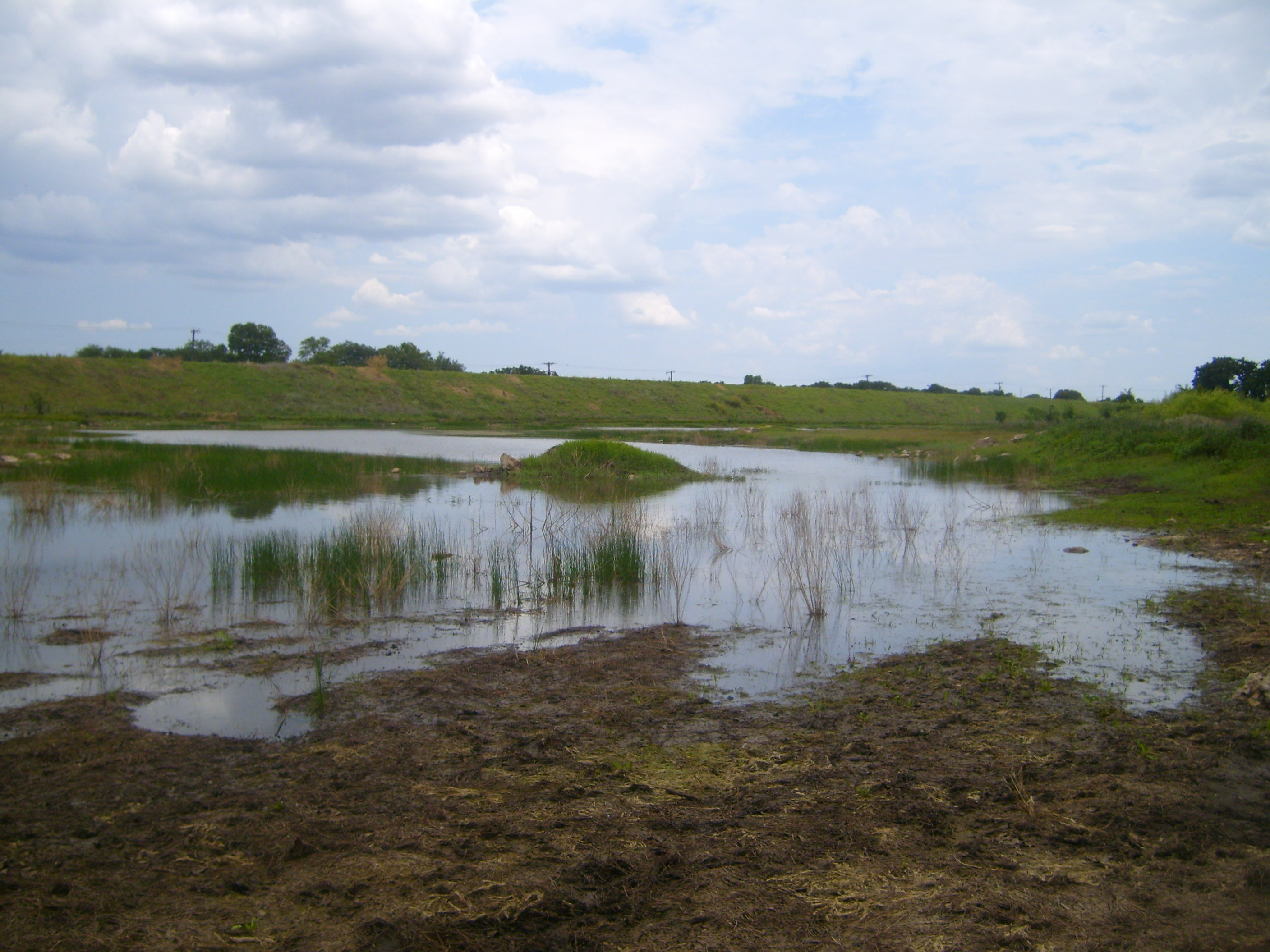
A breeding habitat for male frogs to gather and for females to lay eggs. Also where the larvae develop into tadpoles and transfer into a terrestrial area.

The Houston toad is generally found in areas with loose, sandy soils greater than 40 in (100 cm) in depth and large rolling uplands. Slow-moving or still bodies of water that last at least 30 days are needed for breeding and tadpole development. The toad's original range covered 12 counties in Texas; currently, it is believed to occur in nine counties. However, choruses have only been actually reported in three counties since 2000, representing a seventy-five percent overall reduction in twenty years. Vegetation of its preferred habitat includes loblolly pine, post oak, bluejack oak, yaupon holly, curly threeawn, and little bluestem. They are typically found in water sources such as shallow ponds, rain pools, flooded fields, or man-made ponds which can occur for up to 30 days during the breeding and egg/tadpole development process.

== Threats ==
Though the largest and most immediate threat is habitat loss (especially due to highway expansion, parking lots, and other car-centric infrastructure taking up habitat space), the reduced toad populations are also vulnerable to automobile roadkill, severe air pollution from automobiles, predators, pesticides and drought. As undeveloped land is being converted to agriculture, suburban sprawl, parking lots, wider highways, and other car-centric design, there is less wetland and wooded areas for the Houston toad to be able to survive in.

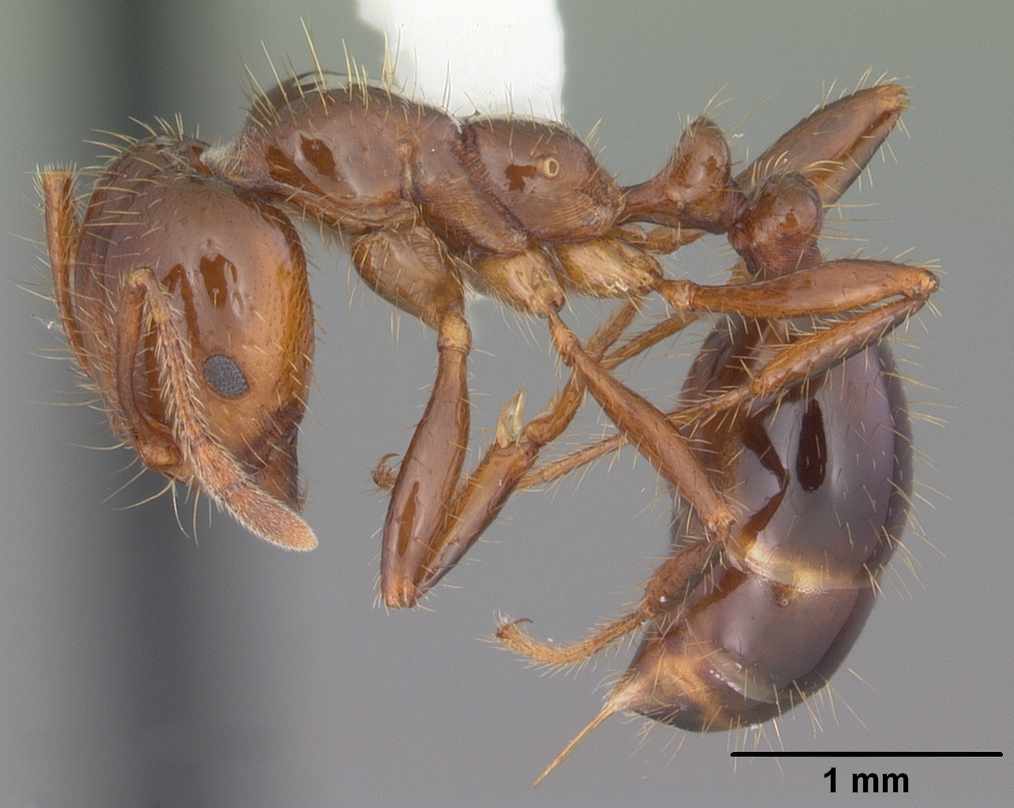
Solenopsis invicta preys on Houston toads, decreasing their population.

Creating ponds out of ephemeral wetlands also significantly affects the toads because of the dispersion of the calling males. The conversions to permanent ponds creates a higher risk to predators such as snakes and fish. In addition to this, competition and hybridization with similar species may increase. As more ponds are created on the terrain the calling males become dispersed through a larger area making it more difficult to breed with females.

Drought has also affected the toad population. During the 1950s there was a long term drought which decreased the breeding sites which increased mortality rates and created uncontrollable wildfire which lead to devastating land altering affects. The species not only lost their breeding sites but also had a loss in eggs and tadpoles due to the pond evaporation. After 2009, the severe drought conditions continued to get worse and occurred throughout the central Texas region, where the Houston toad population resides. It was calculated that during peak breeding season in March 2011, central Texas received under .10 inches (2.5 mm) of rain making it the fourth driest March since 1856. In addition to the decrease in rainfall, the temperature has continued to increase and has become abnormally high. This creates a greater evaporation rate in breeding areas such as small ponds.

Invasive species such as the red imported fire ant (Solenopsis invicta) consume Houston toads, particularly juveniles, and may also impact the toads' food supply by altering availability of preferred invertebrate prey.

== Conservation status ==
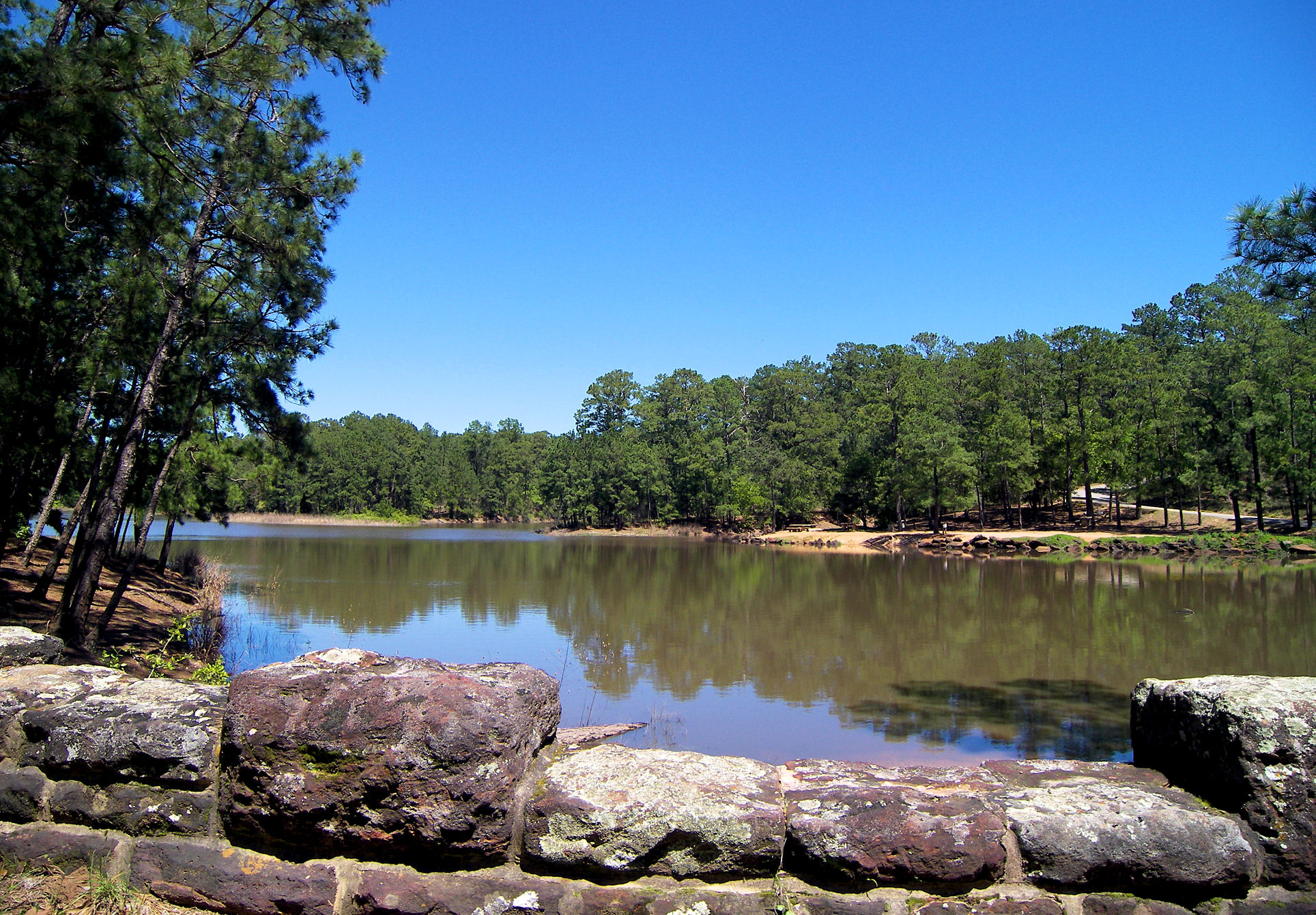
The Bastrop State Park Lake is prime breeding habitat for the Houston Toad and is closed to the public during their mating season in February and March.

By 1960, the Houston toads were unable to be located and in 1970, the Houston toad was federally listed as an endangered species. It was determined that they were extirpated from the Houston, Texas area by the 1960s, likely coincident with the severe drought of the 1950s and concurrent development of its forested habitat in that region. A population that was once in the tens of thousands was down to a mere 3,000.

The largest known chorusing groups persist in Bastrop County, but the choruses monitored in Bastrop State Park showed a dramatic decline during the mid-1990s, with little recovery of those numbers since then. Importantly, that state park is the only public land that supports consistent chorusing from year to year of the Houston toad. However, even there, the total numbers are very low.

Conservation groups are working with private landowners in Bastrop County to protect and restore Houston toad habitat, but even if recovery were to be achieved in Bastrop County, this effort would not have achieved recovery for the species. Efforts toward active conservation efforts in the remaining Houston toad occupied counties and even efforts within counties from which the toad has been extirpated are needed.

In spring 2008, the Lost Pines Habitat Conservation Plan was approved by the United States Fish and Wildlife Service. The plan describes a management and recovery plan for the Houston toad in designated habitat in Bastrop County.

In September 2011, the Bastrop County Complex fire devastated a large part of the Houston toad's habitat. The majority of Bastrop State Park, and much of the central "core" of the occupied habitat within central Bastrop County were affected by severe and catastrophic fire intensities, with large forested areas charred by the fire. The Lost Pines Forest was heavily affected by the fire.

The Houston Zoo maintains a 1200-square-foot captive breeding colony of the Houston toad and released over one million eggs in 2018.

== Recovery ==
=== Plan ===
The first Houston toad Recovery Plan was developed by the Houston Toad Recovery Team with two main goals in 1984. These goals included restoring the populations to their original habitats and determining where all of the remaining populations were located. The Safe Harbor Agreement was created for the Houston toad.

=== Action ===
To aid in the survival of the toad species, the common person can plant native species which will decrease water and pesticide use as well as correctly disposing of gardening, household and agricultural chemicals. Support can be given to the Houston Toad Safe Harbor Agreement if a citizen's land is in the potential habitat.

Red fire ants (Solenopsis invicta) are typical predators of the Houston toad. This led to the fire ant being added into habitat conservation plans and safe harbor agreements. Measures were put in place in order to control the population of red-imported fire ants throughout the Houston toad distribution range.

=== Result ===
A new set of reintroduction techniques have been put into place which has increased egg production. Assisted reproductive techniques such as hormone treatments, biobanking, and in vitro fertilization have been developed by institutions to create optimal genetic diversity and egg development. In addition to this eggs are transported to release sites to give them a higher chance of survival.

There has also been an increase in the wild population. Over 450 male toads were heard at the release sites and there were 42 egg strands discovered. There has also been an increase in range, as toads were found 2.5 miles from release sites.
