= Circle D-KC Estates, Texas =

Census-designated place in Bastrop County, Texas, United States

- Census-designated place
- Coordinates: 30°09′34″N 97°14′50″W
- Country: United States
- State: Texas
- County: Bastrop

Area
  - Total: 9.4 sq mi (24 km^{2})
  - Land: 9.3 sq mi (24 km^{2})
  - Water: 0.1 sq mi (0.26 km^{2})
- Elevation: 492 ft (150 m)

Population (2020)
  - Total: 2,588
  - Density: 280/sq mi (110/km^{2})
- Time zone: UTC-6 (Central (CST))
  - Summer (DST): UTC-5 (CDT)
- FIPS code: 48-14986
- GNIS feature ID: 2034441

Circle D-KC Estates is a census-designated place (CDP) in Bastrop County, Texas, United States. The population was 2,588 at the 2020 census.

== Geography ==
Circle D-KC Estates is located about seven miles northeast of Bastrop.

According to the United States Census Bureau, the CDP has a total area of 9.4 square miles (24 km^{2}), of which 9.3 square miles (24 km^{2}) is land and 0.1 square miles (0.26 km^{2}) is water. The subdivision was heavily damaged in the 2011 Bastrop County Complex fire.

== Demographics ==
Historical population
Census	Pop.	Note	%±
1990	1,247		—
2000	2,393		91.9%
2010	2,010		−16.0%
2020	2,588		28.8%
U.S. Decennial Census; 1850–1900 1910; 1920 1930 1940; 1950 1960 1970; 1980 1990 2000; 2010

Circle D-KC Estates first appeared as a census designated place in the 1990 U.S. census.

=== 2020 census ===
Circle D-KC Estates CDP, Texas – Racial and ethnic composition Note: the US Census treats Hispanic/Latino as an ethnic category. This table excludes Latinos from the racial categories and assigns them to a separate category. Hispanics/Latinos may be of any race.
Race / Ethnicity (NH = Non-Hispanic)	Pop 2000	Pop 2010	Pop 2020	% 2000	% 2010	% 2020
White alone (NH)	1,761	1,882	1,633	87.61%	78.65%	63.10%
Black or African American alone (NH)	18	34	51	0.90%	1.42%	1.97%
Native American or Alaska Native alone (NH)	10	11	11	0.50%	0.46%	0.43%
Asian alone (NH)	6	2	10	0.30%	0.08%	0.39%
Native Hawaiian or Pacific Islander alone (NH)	0	3	7	0.00%	0.13%	0.27%
Other race alone (NH)	0	6	23	0.00%	0.25%	0.89%
Mixed race or Multiracial (NH)	19	34	117	0.95%	1.42%	4.52%
Hispanic or Latino (any race)	196	421	736	9.75%	17.59%	28.44%
Total	2,010	2,393	2,588	100.00%	100.00%	100.00%

As of the 2020 United States census, there were 2,588 people, 1,003 households, and 684 families residing in the CDP.

As of the census of 2010, there were 2,393 people, 938 households, and 660 families residing in the CDP. The population density was 257,3 people per square mile (99.3/km^{2}). There were 1,037 housing units at an average density of 111.5 per square mile (43.1/km^{2}). The racial makeup of the CDP was 89.1% White, 1.6% African American, 1.0% Native American, 0.1% Asian, 5.4% from other races, and 2.8% from two or more races. Hispanic or Latino of any race were 17.6% of the population.

There were 938 households, out of which 28.7% had children under the age of 18 living with them, 58.4% were married couples living together, 8.4% had a female householder with no husband present, and 29.6% were non-families. 22.2% of all households were made up of individuals, and 8.2% had someone living alone who was 65 years of age or older. The average household size was 2.55 and the average family size was 3.00.

In the CDP, the population was spread out, with 23.3% under the age of 19, 3.6% from 19 to 24, 22.7% from 25 to 44, 37.0% from 45 to 64, and 13.3% who were 65 years of age or older. The median age was 45.2 years. For every 100 females, there were 103.3 males. For every 100 females age 18 and over, there were 102.9 males.

The median income for a household in the CDP was $52,983, and the median income for a family was $60,313. Males had a median income of $40,000 versus $30,595 for females. The per capita income for the CDP was $22,996. None of the families and 1.3% of the population were living below the poverty line, including no under eighteens and none of those over 64.

== Education ==
Circle D-KC Estates is served by the Bastrop Independent School District. Most residents are zoned to Emile Elementary School (former Emile School), while some are zoned to Lost Pines Elementary School. All residents are zoned to Bastrop Intermediate School, Bastrop Middle School, and Bastrop High School.

== See also ==
- List of census-designated places in Texas
