= Lost Pines Forest =

- Forest
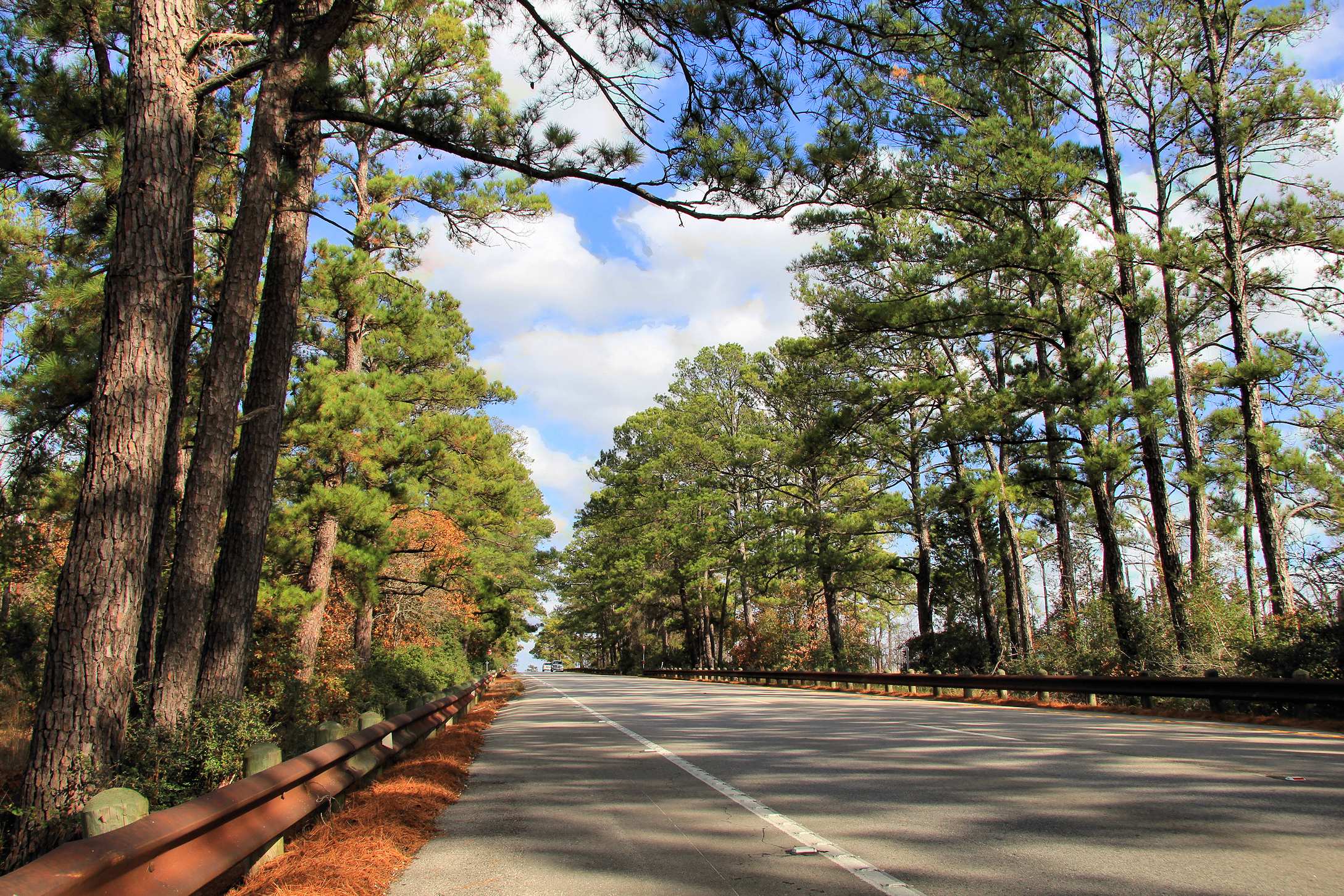
- Part of the Lost Pines Forest along State Highway 21 near Bastrop.

- Location within Texas
- Coordinates: 30°6′43″N 97°19′1″W

The Lost Pines Forest is a 13-mile (21 km) belt of loblolly pines (Pinus taeda) in the U.S. state of Texas, near the town of Bastrop. The stand of pines is unique in Texas because it is a disjunct population of trees that is more than 100 miles (160 km) separated from, and yet closely genetically related to, the vast expanse of pine trees of the Piney Woods region that covers parts of Texas, Arkansas, Louisiana, and Oklahoma.

== History ==
The forest is thought to have originated as part of a much larger pine forest that shrank in size during the last glacial period of the Pleistocene era. It was first described by early Spanish explorer Domingo Terán de los Ríos in his expedition along the Colorado River in 1691 and later by Stephen F. Austin and other settlers drawn to the area by the land grants awarded by the Mexican government. The Bastrop Steam Mill Company began lumbering in the Lost Pines in 1838, followed by Higgins Mill in 1840. By 1870 the population for Bastrop County reached 11,000 people, which increased demands for timber. Extensive logging of the Lost Pines occurred around 1880, but the forested land area remained largely intact. The Lost Pines Forest occupied 36,400 hectares in 1880 and of this, 34,400 hectares remained in 1952.

A portion of the Lost Pines is located inside the boundaries of Bastrop State Park and Buescher State Park, which ensure the trees are protected from development and logging. The original Lost Pines Forest sampled within the Bastrop State Park has the same levels of genetic diversity found in the larger, more continuous East Texas Piney Woods and in the rest of the extensive Pinus taeda forests west of the Mississippi River Valley. Thus the original Lost Pines population is not genetically depauperate despite its geographic separation from the larger, more continuous Pinus taeda forest. Pinus taeda can live as long as 300 to 400 years.

The retreating edge hypothesis for species responding to climate change predicts severe bottlenecks and eventual extinction. The disjunct Lost Pines population at the westernmost edge of the widespread Pinus taeda range is well suited for testing this prediction. The occurrence of one or more genetic bottlenecks in the Lost Pines population was tested using 34 nuclear microsatellite markers and a control sample from the larger, more continuous east Texas P. taeda forests. The Lost Pines population has undergone drastic contractions in effective population size between 3000 and 30 000 years bp. These results were supported by: (i) detection of transient heterozygosity excess, (ii) a mode-shift indicator of allele frequencies, and (iii) a ratio of allele number to allele size range. No bottleneck was detected for the east Texas control using any of the three methods. The distribution of allele frequencies was skewed for the Lost Pines population compared to the control, indicating a loss of rare alleles. However, allelic diversity was similar between the Lost Pines population and its east Texas control; the mean allele number per locus was 5.29 and 5.38, respectively. It is proposed that the Lost Pines population was the western refugium for P. taeda during Pleistocene glaciation and that East Texas P. taeda forests descended from the bottlenecked Lost Pines population.

== 2011 fire ==
A large portion of the forest was burned in the Bastrop County Complex Fire that occurred in September and October 2011. The fire scorched 34,068 acres (13,787 hectares), severely impacting the Lost Pines Forest. Since the fire, efforts have been undertaken by several groups to reforest the affected portion of the unique Lost Pines eco-region. The Texas A&M Forest Service and Bastrop County, along with the Lost Pines Recovery Team and TreeFolks, have developed a program to reforest private property affected by the fire, embarking on a 5-year campaign to plant more than 2 million loblolly pine trees on privately owned land in Bastrop County.
