= Hidden Pines Fire =

2015 wildfire in Texas, United States

The Hidden Pines Fire was a wildfire in Bastrop County, Texas in October 2015. It burned over 4,582 acres and destroyed 64 homes and many other buildings. An investigation by the Texas A&M Forest Service Law Enforcement Department said the fire was likely caused by an accident on Luecke ranch near Smithville, which produced a spark that came out from around a cutting unit pulled behind a tractor. The spark ignited dry grass around the tractor, starting the fire. The fire was fully contained after 11 days on October 24, in part because of widespread rain.

== Background ==
In the months leading up to the fire, Texas had frequent periods of widespread heavy rain, which was followed by a period of abrupt, intense drought. The temperature continued to remain high as the summer heat lingered, with temperatures reaching 99 degrees on October 12 in the Austin area. The drought continued to remain, and the Bastrop RAWS station reported only .25 inches of rain from September 12 to October 12.
