= Texas A&M Forest Service =

American forestry service

Agency overview
- Formed: 1915
- Jurisdiction: Texas
- Headquarters: 200 Technology Way College Station, Texas, U.S.
- Parent agency: Texas A&M University System
- Website: https://tfsweb.tamu.edu/

Texas A&M Forest Service (TAMFS) is an American agency chartered by the Texas Legislature to manage the interests of Texas' forests. The Legislature created the service in 1915.

It is a part of the Texas A&M University System and is headquartered in College Station, Texas.

Among its responsibilities are to manage state owned timberlands, serve as the lead agency in dealing with wildfires throughout the state, and maintain a registry of famous trees throughout the state.

In addition to fighting wildfires, Texas A&M Forest Service (TFS) is routinely called upon under the State Emergency Management Plan to assist during all-hazard emergencies such as natural and man-made disasters and domestic situations; most recently Hurricane Harvey.

As such, TFS employs the nationally recognized Incident Command System (ICS) which ensures effective and efficient incident management.

TFS maintains a workforce of highly trained and experienced personnel and works with other responding state agencies, most notably Texas Division of Emergency Management and Texas Military Forces to increase the effectiveness of response through shared training.

== Arboretums ==
Several arboretums have been created by the Forest Service. The Ruth Bowling Nichols Arboretum is located in Cherokee County, Texas. The Olive Scott Perry Arboretum is located in Hardin County, Texas
