= 1950s Texas drought =

Natural disaster in Texas, United States

External audio
- "Making the Deserts Bloom: Harnessing nature to deliver us from drought", Distillations Podcast and transcript, Episode 239, March 19, 2019, Science History Institute

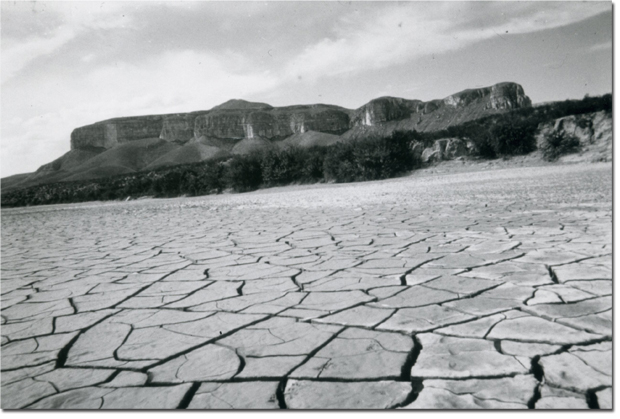
Cracked dry land in West Texas, 1951

The 1950s Texas drought was a period between 1949 and 1957 in which the state received 30 to 50% less rain than normal, while temperatures rose above average. During this time, Texans experienced the second-, third-, and eighth-driest single years ever in the state – 1956, 1954, and 1951, respectively. The drought was described by a state water official as "the most costly and one of the most devastating droughts in 600 years."

== Effects ==
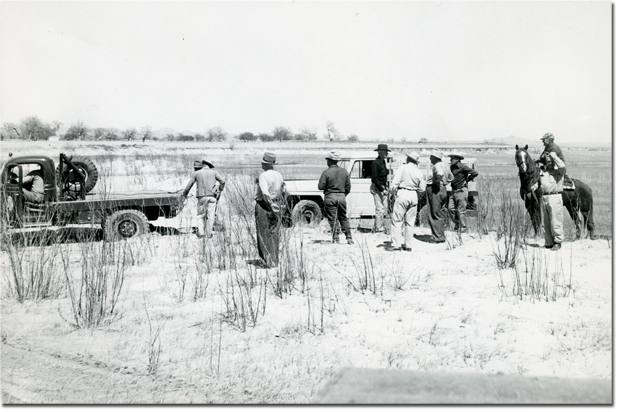
Car towed after getting stuck in a completely dry Texas river bed.

The drought began gradually, and some sources claim it began as early as 1947, starting with a decrease in rainfall in Central Texas. By the summer of 1951, the entire state was in drought. Texas ranchers attempted to evade the effects of the drought by moving their cattle north to Kansas, but the drought spread to Kansas and Oklahoma by 1953. At that point, 75% of Texas recorded below-normal rainfall amounts, and over half the state was more than 30 inches below normal rainfall. By 1954, the drought had affected a 10-state area reaching from the Midwest to the Great Plains, and southward into New Mexico and the Deep South, where Mississippi, Alabama, Georgia and South Carolina all experienced their driest calendar year since reliable records began. By the end of the decade, half of the farming industry in Texas was gone.

=== Economy ===
As a result of the devastating drought of the 1950s, the number of Texas farms and ranches shrank from 345,000 to 247,000, and the state's rural population declined from more than a third of the population to a quarter. Ranchers and farmers were hit the hardest by the dual threat of water scarcity and the increasing price of feed. The combined income of Texas farmers fell by one-fifth from the previous year, and the price of low-grade beef cattle dropped from 15 to 5 cents a pound. In 1940, 29% of employed Texans worked on a farm. That number fell to 12% in 1960. Crop yields in some areas dropped as much as 50%. Economic losses from 1950 to 1957 were estimated at $22 billion in 2011 dollars.

Towns suffered from the drought, as well, though it was different from the struggles of farmers. Across Texas, at least 1000 communities enforced some type of water restrictions. Some towns went completely dry and had to transport water in by truck or rail. The city of Dallas' reservoirs ran so low that water had to be pumped from the Red River, whose high salt content caused further trouble by damaging water pipes and plants. Corsicana experienced 82 days of temperatures over 100 °F or 37.8 °C, peaking at 113 °F or 45 °C. West Texas was hit especially hard by the drought, particularly the city of San Angelo, where President Dwight D. Eisenhower visited in 1957 to assess the effects of the drought just before it ended.

Freeport, Texas, one of the last cities to get its drinking water from the Brazos River before the river reached the sea, opened the first desalination plant in the United States in 1961 with the hope of bringing water security to the region. The first of five plants to test different technologies, Walter L. Badger's Freeport plant used evaporation to separate water from salt, chlorine and other solids. It was applauded by President John F. Kennedy as "more important than any other scientific enterprise in which this country is now engaged."

=== Environment ===
The severe drought also had a lasting effect on the Texas environment. Without new grass growth, cattlemen overgrazed their pastures, which damaged the land and made it more susceptible to mesquite and juniper ("cedar") intrusion. Poor soil conservation practices left the topsoil vulnerable, and when the drought began, strong winds swept the soil and dust into the sky. This led to persistent dust storms that rivaled those during the Dust Bowl.

== Government intervention ==
The situation became so dire that the US government began distributing emergency feed supplies to desperate farmers. Some farmers resorted to feeding their animals prickly pear or molasses to keep them alive. In 1956, The New York Times reported that more than 100,000 Texans were receiving surplus "federal food commodities." By the time the drought subsided in 1957, 244 of the 254 counties in Texas were declared federal drought disaster areas.

On January 13, 1957, President Eisenhower and Agriculture Secretary Ezra Taft Benson visited San Angelo as part of a six-state inspection tour of the drought. There, he made a speech to the people that his administration would do whatever they could to alleviate the hardship of the drought.

== Rain returns ==
Shortly after the president's visit, rain finally came. Intermittent January rains gave way to downpours in February, which continued through the spring and summer seasons. On April 24, 1957, a storm brought 10 inches of rain on a large portion of Texas within a few hours, accompanied by destructive hail and multiple tornadoes. The rain continued for 32 days, and the floods killed 22 people and forced thousands from their homes. Every major river in Texas flooded, washing out bridges and sweeping away houses. Damages were estimated at $120 million, which still paled in comparison to the damage caused by the drought itself.

== Prevention ==
In the hope of preventing such a crisis from happening again, the state developed drought contingency plans, expanded the state's water storage and sought new sources of groundwater. The state created the Texas Water Development Board in 1957, which set into motion a number of water-conservation plans. An amendment to the Texas constitution in 1957 authorized the issuance of $200 million in loans to municipalities for conservation and development of water resources. The number of Texas reservoirs more than doubled by 1970, and by 1980, more than 126 major reservoirs had been constructed. State and federal departments of agriculture set up safeguard programs to help farmers handle future severe droughts, including low-interest emergency loans and emergency access to hay and grazing land.

The state began a number of efforts to increase water supply, building dams, forming lakes, and tapping into underground sources of water. From 1947 to 1957, groundwater use increased fivefold. As the drought spurred farmers to find more water sources, cheaper pumps were made available. From 1957 to 1970, workers built 69 dams, including Longhorn Dam on the Colorado River, which formed Lady Bird Lake in Austin in 1960. Today, Texas has more surface areas of lake than any state except Minnesota.

The 1950s drought remains to be a model for water-conservation plans in the present day, with Texas water authorities using the effects of the drought's severity to create water plans.

== Popular culture ==
The 1950s Texas drought has been written about by a number of Texans who experienced it, including Elmer Kelton, renowned Western novelist and agricultural journalist, whose novel The Time It Never Rained, is still regarded as the best account of the period.

The 1989-93 TV science fiction show, Quantum Leap, in its episode "A Single Drop of Rain - September 7, 1953" is set during the Texas drought of 1953. The show's protagonist, Dr. Sam Beckett (Scott Bakula) leaps into the body of a rainmaker in the con man's hometown. The area is desperate for rain as the crops fail and the cattle die.

== See also ==
- Droughts in the United States
- 2010–13 Southern United States and Mexico drought
