= 2011 in religion =

This is a timeline of events during the year 2011 that relate to religion.

== Events ==
- 18 March – In Lautsi v. Italy, the European Court of Human Rights ruled that the Italian law requiring the display of crucifixes in classrooms does not violate the European Convention on Human Rights.
- 22–24 April – The Days of Prayer for Rain in the State of Texas occur.
