= Granada Hills =

Granada Hills may refer to the following places in the United States:

- Granada Hills, Los Angeles
- Granada Hills, Austin, Texas
