= Granada Hills, Austin, Texas =

Neighborhood of Austin, Texas

Coordinates: 30.221°N 97.902°W

Neighborhood map

Granada Hills is a neighborhood located in southwest Austin, Texas. Granada Hills is located in ZIP code 78737. The neighborhood boundaries are FM 1826 on the south and east sides, Highway 290 and the Scenic Brook neighborhood to the north, and Southview Road and Belterra on the west side.

Granada Hills is located in the Austin Independent School District.
