= 2012–2013 North American drought =

Natural disaster in North America

Animation of U.S. drought map, 2012–2013

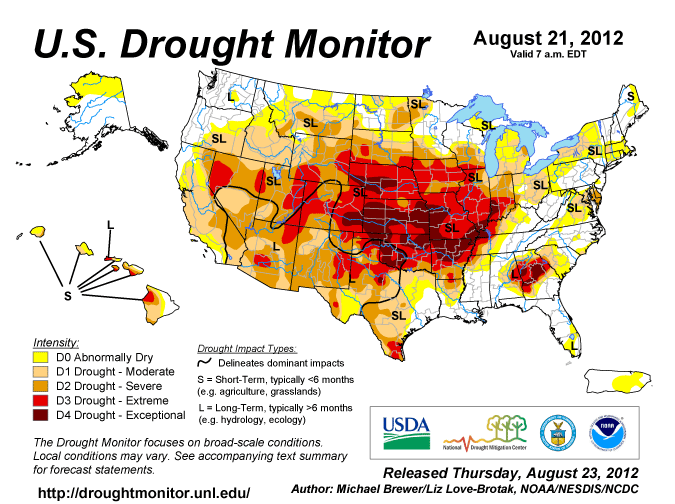
The U.S. Drought Monitor on August 21, 2012

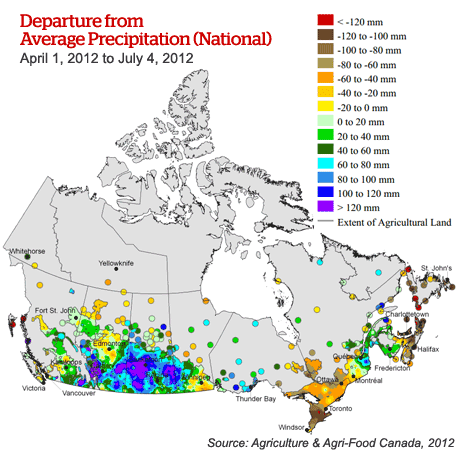
A map showing the drought in Eastern Canada

The 2012–2013 North American drought, an expansion of the 2010–2013 Southern United States drought, originated in the midst of a record-breaking heat wave. Low snowfall amounts in winter, coupled with the intense summer heat from La Niña, caused drought-like conditions to migrate northward from the southern United States, wreaking havoc on crops and water supply. The drought inflicted significant economic ramifications for the affected states. It exceeded, in many measures, the 1988–1989 North American drought, the most recent comparable drought.

The drought affected most of the U.S., parts of Mexico, and central and Eastern Canada. At its peak in July 2012, it covered approximately 81 percent of the contiguous United States with at least abnormally dry (D0) conditions. Out of that 81%, 64% was designated as at least moderate drought (D1) conditions. Its area was comparable to the droughts of the 1930s and 1950s.

Drought continued in parts of North America through 2013. Beginning in March 2013, improved rainfall across the Midwest, southern Mississippi Valley, and Great Plains began gradually alleviating drought in these areas, while drought continued to intensify in the Western United States. Heavy rains across previously drought-stricken areas resulted in widespread flooding in portions of the Midwest, a phenomenon which was named "weather whiplash". By June 2013, approximately the eastern half of the United States was drought-free, while conditions continued to gradually improve across the Plains. Moderate to severe drought continued to impact and worsen throughout the western United States, with some portions of the United States being afflicted by the drought for over three years. Through the winter of 2013–2014, California continued to receive record low rainfall. For many locations, the calendar year of 2013 was the driest year in over 130 years. Some locations received less than half of their previous record low rainfall amounts.

== Meteorological background ==
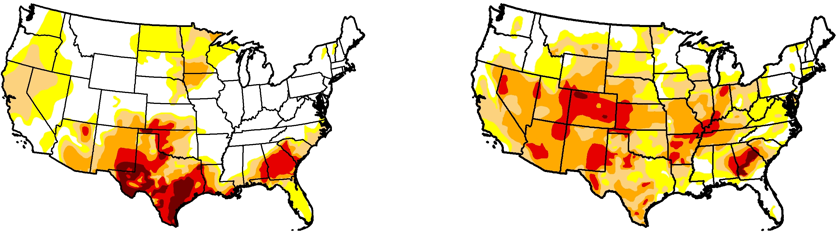
United States Drought Monitor on January 3 and July 3, 2012; note the massive expansion from the South to most of the U.S.

The drought was set in motion when strongly positive Arctic oscillation and North Atlantic oscillation conditions removed winter storms from the U.S. the winter of 2011–2012. When spring arrived, very little snow existed to melt and moisten the ground, and thus very little water to evaporate and create rainfall. The effects of the lack of snow were immediate. Dry conditions could be noticed immediately, and contributed to a weak tornado season in the U.S. The strongest tornado outbreak of 2012 occurred on March 2, after most snow had melted. The drought continued to steadily intensify along with a decline in rainfall which is still ongoing. The Summer 2012 North American heat wave caused further evaporation of groundwater, lakes, reservoirs, and rivers and streams.

Percent Area in U.S. Drought Monitor Categories

As moisture has continued to decline, the conditions are becoming self-sustaining (i.e. a lack of rainfall means that less moisture is available to promote additional rainfall, in a vicious cycle). In many areas, the only way for drought conditions to be significantly alleviated in the short-term would be for a discrete, long-lived, and large system (such as a tropical cyclone) to impact the area. Soil hardening due to the drought means that even if a large amount of rain falls in a short time, most of it is not absorbed and instead runs off quickly, causing flash floods rather than drought relief. The June 2012 North American derecho and other strong storms in late June and early July did not appear to ease drought conditions, as the rainwater ran off rapidly from the affected areas.

The drought continued and intensified into the end of November 2014 for a large part of the country. Although drought/dry conditions are likely to drop at least one category level in the Southwest, Southeast, Northeast, and Northern Plains as well as portions of the Ohio River Valley, it is expected to have both short-term and long-term impacts across nearly the entire affected area.

A study by Utah State University analyzed the 2011 Missouri River Flooding and predicted that "a prominent teleconnection forcing in driving the wet/dry spells in the (Missouri River Basin)... implies persistence of dry conditions for the next 2 to 3 years", which coincides with the 2012–15 drought. That analysis was based upon a marked variability at the 10- to 15- year time scale that is coincident with the water storage increase in the Missouri River Basin. The study found that precipitation over the Missouri River Basin undergoes a profound modulation during the transition points of the Pacific quasi-decadal oscillation and associated teleconnections.

== Impacts ==
=== United States ===
Percentage of crops affected by various drought severity levels

The drought cost more than $35 billion in the Midwest, and may have reduced the gross domestic product of the U.S. as a whole by 0.5–1%, equating to a loss of $75 to $150 billion.

Crops, particularly strains grown in the most heavily affected regions (such as corn and soybeans), were noted to be failing or yielding very low in 2012 due to the drought's presence in farming areas. This increase in cost moved up the feeding chain and resulted in raised prices for meat, dairy, and processed food products.Food prices increased as a result of the consequent supply shortfall. The price of farm equipment, on the other hand, decreased as farmers were forced to sell off their equipment and machinery to cope with decreased incomes.

Water levels on parts of the Mississippi River plummeted, affecting trade and commerce.

1,692 counties across 36 states in the U.S. were legally declared primary natural disaster areas in August 2012 as the drought covered over 62% of the contiguous U.S. Hundreds of additional counties bordering the primary disaster areas were designated as "contiguous" disaster areas, and are also eligible for federal aid.

The number of cattle in the U.S. decreased to the lowest in 60 years due to drought impacts, with 69% of cattle located in areas that faced drought conditions.

==== California ====
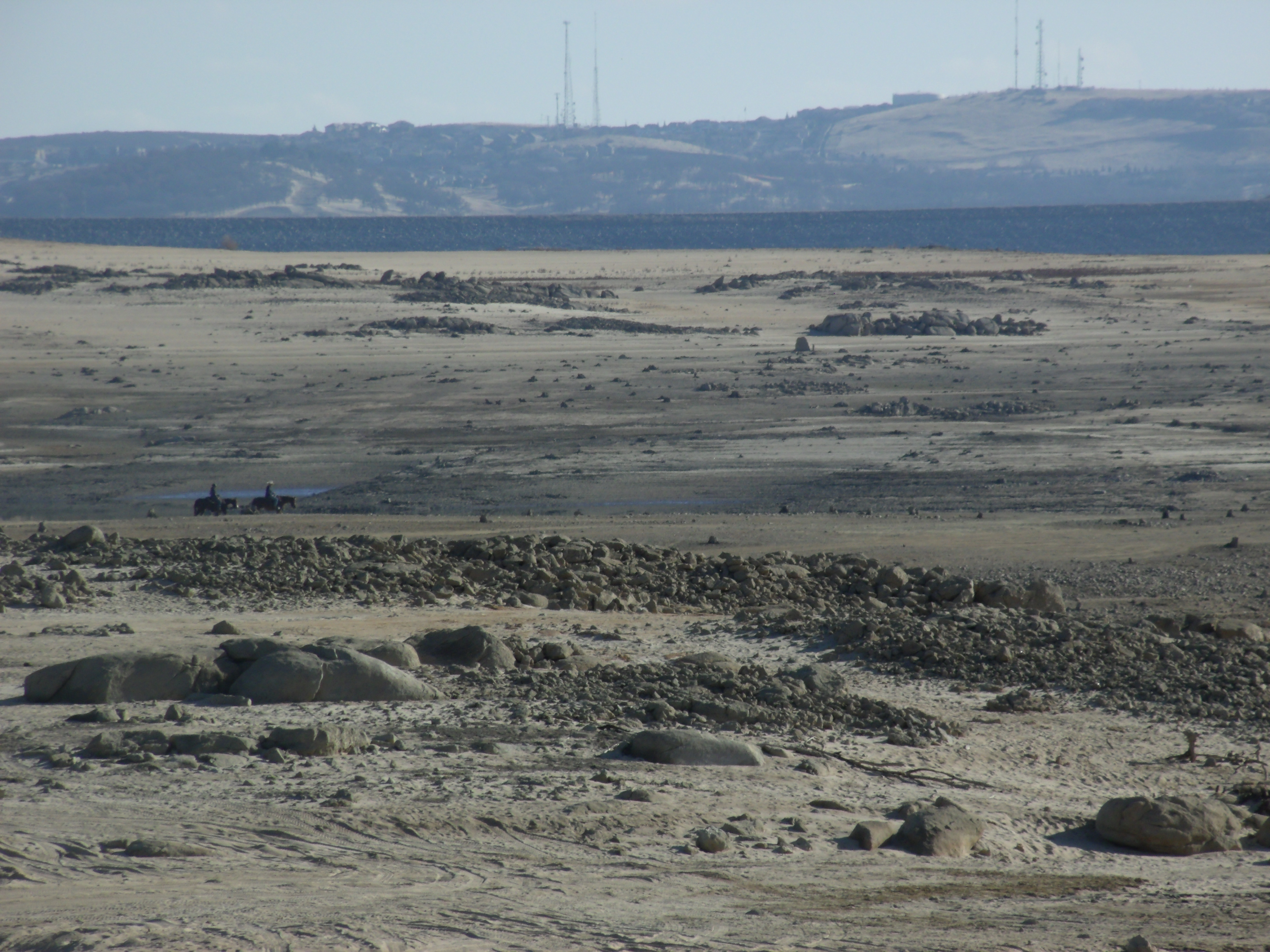
Folsom Lake reservoir during the California drought in January 2014

California had been experiencing a drought since 2011. In 2013 the total rainfall was less than 34% of what was expected. Many regions of the state accumulated less rainfall in 2013 than any other year on record. As a result of this, many fish species were threatened. Streams and rivers were so low that fish couldn't get to their spawning grounds, and survival rates of any eggs that are laid were expected to be low. Lack of rainfall had caused the mouths of rivers to be blocked off by sand bars which further prevents fish from reaching their spawning grounds. Stafford Lehr, Chief of Fisheries within the California Department of Fish and Wildlife says that 95% of winter run salmon didn't survive in 2013. Not only did the drought severely affect fishing, but also agriculture. Decreasing rainfall amounts and increasing temperatures cause agriculture to be much more challenging due to increasing rates of evapotranspiration.

In response to heightening drought conditions, California tightened fishing restrictions in many areas of the state. Streams and rivers on the northern coast had unprecedented amounts of fishing bans. In February 2015 the California Fish and Game Commission voted unanimously to further tighten regulations on both recreational and commercial fishing. The U.S. Endangered Species Act listed steelhead as threatened and coho salmon as endangered. The California Department of Fish and Wildlife closed dozens of streams and rivers to fishing in 2014. Lehr said that he fears coho salmon may go completely extinct south of the Golden Gate Bridge in the near future. In early 2014 the main stems of the Eel, Mad, Smith, Van Duzen, and Mattole rivers were closed pending additional rainfall. Large areas of the Russian and American rivers were closed indefinitely. Most rivers in San Mateo, Santa Cruz and Monterey counties were also closed pending further rainfall. Other actions were also taken, such as releasing more water from the Kent Dam in hopes of raising the levels in the Lagunitas Creek watershed – one of the last spawning grounds that wild coho can still reach.

Protesters said that banning fishing will disrupt the economy and threaten the livelihoods of individuals who rely on salmon fishing during the winters. Officials felt that it would help prevent species that are already at risk of extinction.

=== Canada ===
The drought affected Canada mainly in the east in Ontario, Quebec, and the Atlantic provinces, where there was record setting heat and very little rainfall. Summer crops in these areas were affected and the price of produce, particularly corn and soybeans, was expected to increase.

== See also ==
Concurrent and related weather events

- Summer 2012 North American heat wave
- June 2012 North American derecho
- 2012 Oklahoma wildfires
- 2012 Colorado wildfires
- Climate change in California
- 2013 California wildfires
- 2014 California wildfires
- 2015 Puerto Rican drought

Other widespread severe droughts

- Dust Bowl
- 1950s North American drought
- 1988 North American drought
- 2020–22 North American drought
