= 2010–2013 Southern United States and Mexico drought =

Severe to extreme drought in the Southern United States and large parts of Mexico

This visualization shows how the drought developed in the U.S. in 2010, 2011, and 2012.

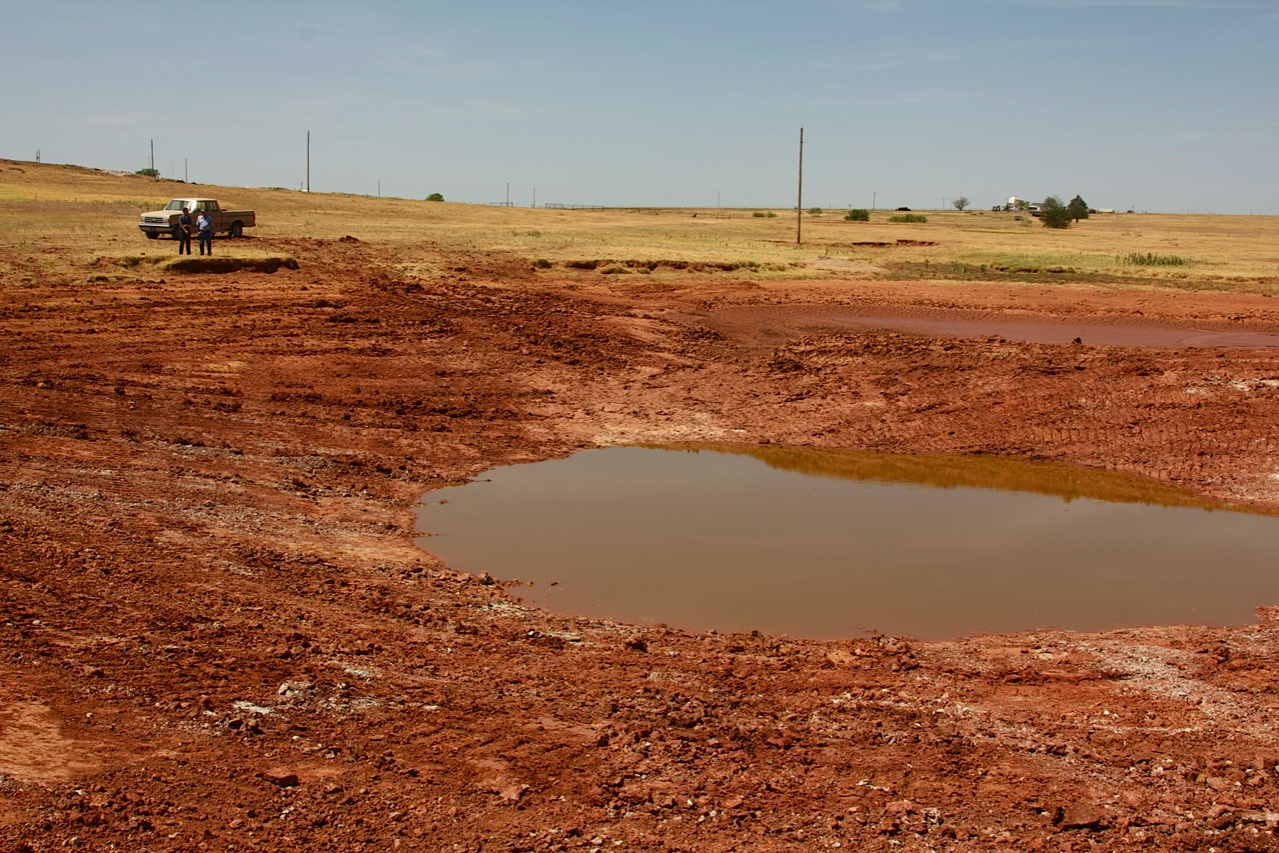
Dried up lake in Oklahoma as a result of the drought

The 2010–2013 Southern United States and Mexico drought was a severe to extreme drought that plagued the Southern United States, including parts of Texas, Louisiana, Arkansas, Mississippi, Alabama, Georgia, South Carolina, North Carolina, Florida, and Oklahoma; the Southwestern States, including Kansas, Colorado, New Mexico, and Arizona; as well as large parts of Mexico, in a three-year pattern from 2010 to 2013.

The worst effects were in Texas, which experienced the brunt of the drought and its driest August–July (12-month) period on record from 2010 to 2011. The dry spell in May 2011 was also said to be the worst period of drought in Texas since 1895. The U.S. Drought Monitor reported that Lubbock, Texas, has experienced the nation's worst average level of drought since the beginning of 2011. McAllen, Harlingen, Brownsville and Corpus Christi also ranked among the nine U.S. cities most affected by extreme drought. The drought in Texas caused an estimated $7.62 billion in crop and livestock losses, surpassing the previous record loss of $4.1 billion set in 2006.

== History ==
The drought began due to a strong La Niña developing by the summer of 2010 which brings below average rainfall to the southern United States. The effects of the La Niña could be noticed immediately as much of the south receives important rainfall during the summer, and this was the driest summer for Texas and Georgia in the 21st century thus far, and much of the south received record low rainfall.

Throughout 2011, the drought was confined to the Deep South as the mid-south received flooding due to severe weather and tornadoes. However, the drought continued and intensified in the Deep South as Texas saw 2011 become its second-driest year on record, Oklahoma saw its fourth-driest, and Georgia saw its seventh-driest year on record. The winter of 2011–12 was one of the driest winters on record for the eastern and central United States. In the spring of 2012, the drought made a massive expansion from the Deep South to the Midwest, Mid-south, Great Plains, and Ohio valley. At its peak in August 2012 the drought covered approximately 81% of the United States. Throughout the winter of 2012–13, heavy rain and snow brought relief to the drought in the southern and eastern United States, even causing severe flooding. By March 2013, the eastern United States was drought-free, effectively ending the 2010–13 southern U.S. drought. Drought continued on the Great Plains until 2014. However, drought developed in the western United States in 2013 and still exists today in some areas.

== Effects ==
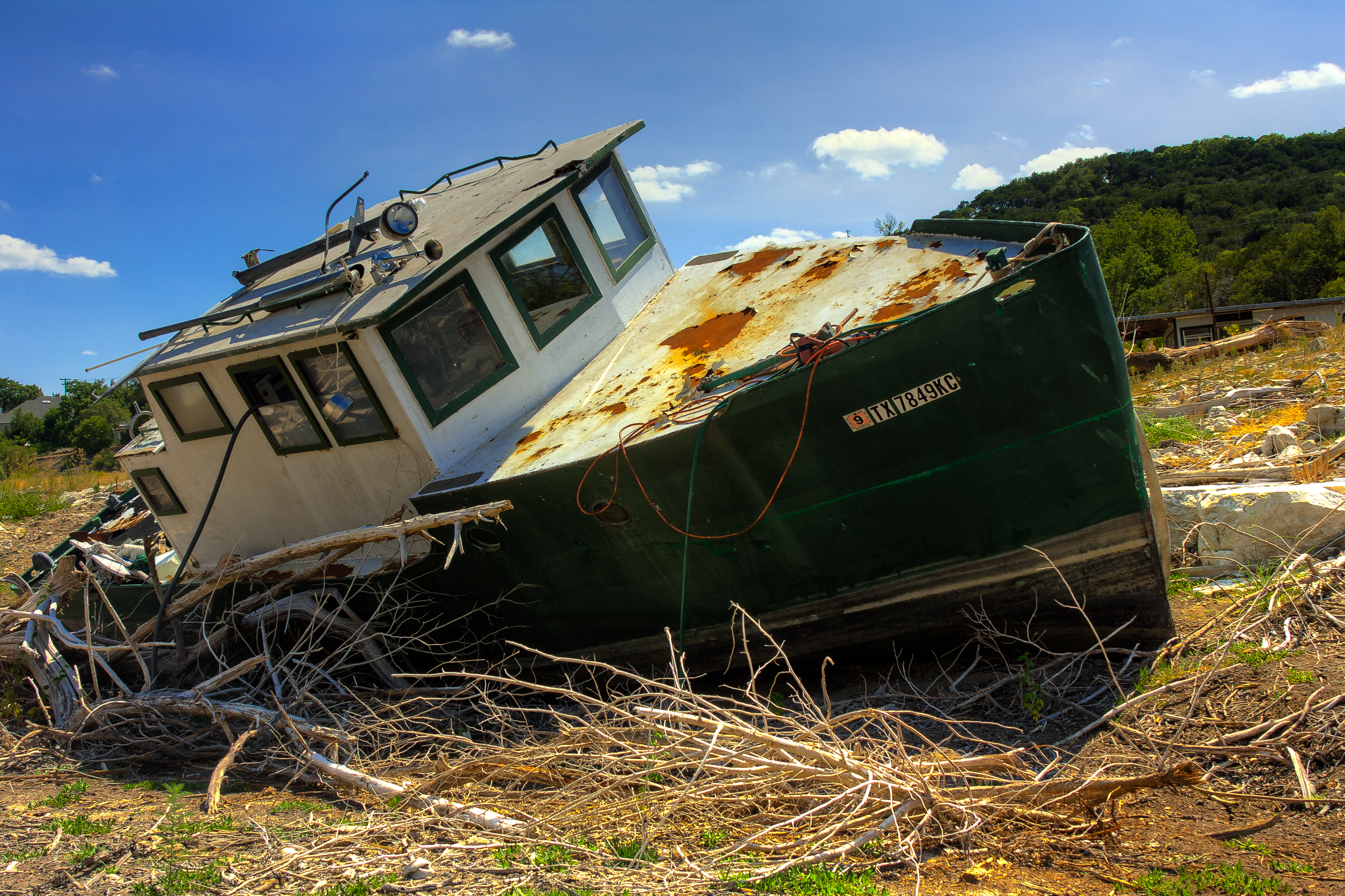
The drought dried up most of Central Texas water ways. This boat was left to sit in the middle of what is normally a branch of Lake Travis, part of the Colorado River.

The drought caused severe lack of water in the southern plains and Rocky Mountains as well as numerous wildfires, in particular the 2011 Texas wildfires, the Wallow Fire and Horseshoe 2 Fire in Arizona, the Whitewater-Baldy Complex Fire and Little Bear Fire in New Mexico, and the 2012 Colorado wildfires in Colorado. Mexico also saw serious impact from the drought which decimated crops, killed over a million cattle, and stressed local water and food supplies. The drought has been described as the worst seen in the country in 70 years.

By the end of August 2011, a ban on outdoor burning was in effect for 251 of the 254 Texas counties. Lake levels in Texas had declined vastly, some by as much as 50 feet; E.V. Spence Reservoir dropped below 1% capacity in July 2011. This revealed various previously submerged items, ranging from a Native American's skull to a Space Shuttle Columbia tank. On August 30, several homes in Oklahoma City were destroyed along with 1,500 wooded acres. Hundreds of homes had to be evacuated.

The drought had a detrimental effect on Texas and Oklahoma cattle ranches, who deeply culled their herds and helped cut the national cattle population to the lowest level in decades.

2012 spring rainfall improved conditions in many parts of Texas and by April 12, 2012, only 14% of the state was in "exceptional" drought, compared to 88% at the drought's peak.

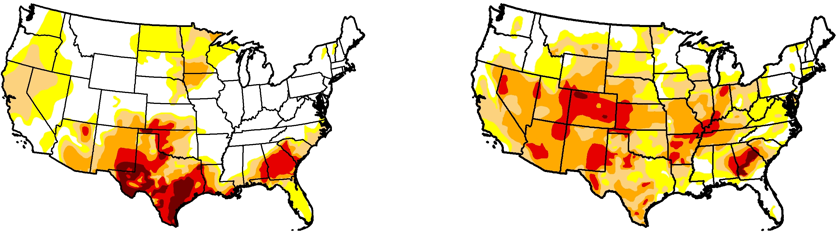
United States Drought Monitor on January 3 and July 3, 2012. Note the massive expansion from the South to most of the US.

In spring and summer of 2012, the drought expanded and formed the 2012 North American drought, affecting more than 80% of the contiguous United States.

In late summer of 2012, the drought eased in portions of the southern US, but continued to intensify in the central US.

== In Texas ==
Every week of 2011 Texas drought

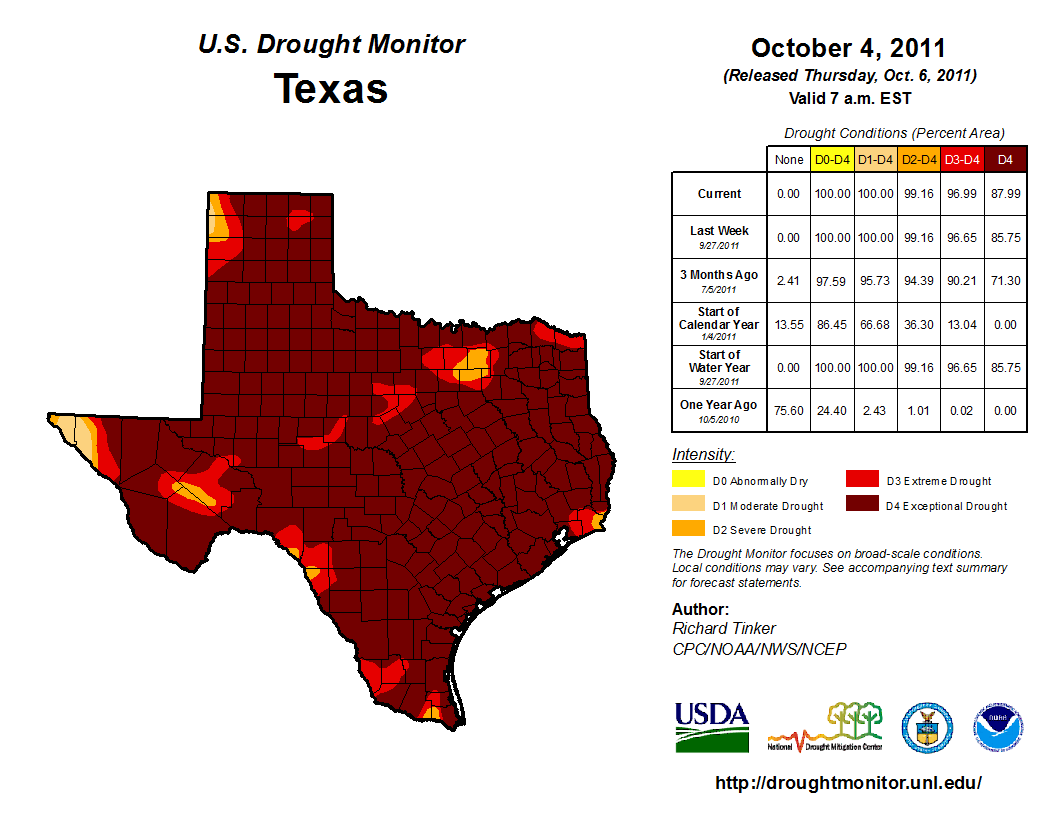
A map of the Texas drought on October 4, 2011, when it was at its worst.

According to the U.S. Drought Monitor, a joint effort of the National Drought Mitigation Center, the United States Department of Agriculture and the National Oceanic and Atmospheric Administration, as of late November 2012, about 4 percent of Texas remained in "extreme" or "exceptional" drought, the two most severe categories.

The drought caused billions of dollars in losses throughout the state economy. Farmers and ranchers were among those hardest hit. The Texas A&M AgriLife Extension Service estimates that Texas agricultural producers lost nearly $7.6 billion due to the drought.

Drought and unprecedented heat made 2011 the worst year for wildfires in Texas history. From Nov. 15, 2010 through Sept. 29, 2011, Texas saw 23,835 fires that burned more than 3.8 million acres and destroyed 2,763 Texas homes. Timber lost to drought and wildfire could have produced $1.6 billion worth of products, resulting in a $3.4 billion economic impact in East Texas.

== See also ==
- 2012–13 North American drought
- 2010 Northern Hemisphere summer
- Days of Prayer for Rain in the State of Texas
- 2011 North American heat wave
- Summer 2012 North American heat wave
- 2012 Colorado wildfires
- 2012 Oklahoma wildfires
- Global warming
- Desertification
- La Niña
