= Scenic Brook, Austin, Texas =

Neighborhood of Austin, Texas

Coordinates: 30°14′12″N 97°53′26″W

Neighborhood boundaries

Scenic Brook is a neighborhood located in southwest Austin, Texas. Scenic Brook is located in ZIP codes 78735 and 78736. The boundaries are the intersections of U.S. Route 290 and Texas State Highway 71 to on the north, south, and east sides, and Covered Bridge Drive and Scenic Brook Drive on the west side. The Pinnacle Campus of Austin Community College is a landmark on the southeast side of the neighborhood.

The 2011 Texas wildfires damaged houses and greenbelt in the southern area of the neighborhood.

Scenic Brook is located in the Austin Independent School District. Austin City Council District 8 covers the Scenic Brook area in along with other parts of southwest Austin.
