= Days of Prayer for Rain in the State of Texas =

2011 US gubernatorial proclamation

US Seasonal Drought Outlook from NOAA for April 21 – July 31, 2011

The Days of Prayer for Rain in the State of Texas was a designated period from Friday, April 22, 2011, to Sunday, April 24, 2011, during which Texas governor Rick Perry asked that Texans pray for "the healing of our land [Texas]" and for an end to the drought. The governor noted that in the past, Texans "have been strengthened, assured and lifted up through prayer", and that he thus believed prayer to be an appropriate measure to address the drought.

Perry designated the Days of Prayer in a gubernatorial proclamation issued on April 21. Precedents for his action included similar initiatives in Texas at the municipal level and a prayer service for rain led by Georgia governor Sonny Perdue in 2007.

The proclamation, which did not specify a text for the prayer and called for the "Days of Prayer" to begin on Good Friday, received some criticism.

== Aftermath ==
The drought continued to worsen for four months following the Days of Prayer. While only 15–17% of the state was undergoing exceptional drought by late April, the percentage grew to 50% a month later, and by late June, more than 70% of the state was experiencing exceptional drought conditions, a level at which it persisted until August 18, 2011. Most of the drought conditions subsided by the end of summer, when rain returned to various parts of Texas.

The first major rain in the state after the Days of Prayer came 168 days later on October 9, 2011.

== See also ==
- Rainmaking (ritual)
- 2011 Texas wildfires
- Efficacy of prayer
