= 2011 Texas wildfires =

Series of wildfires in Texas

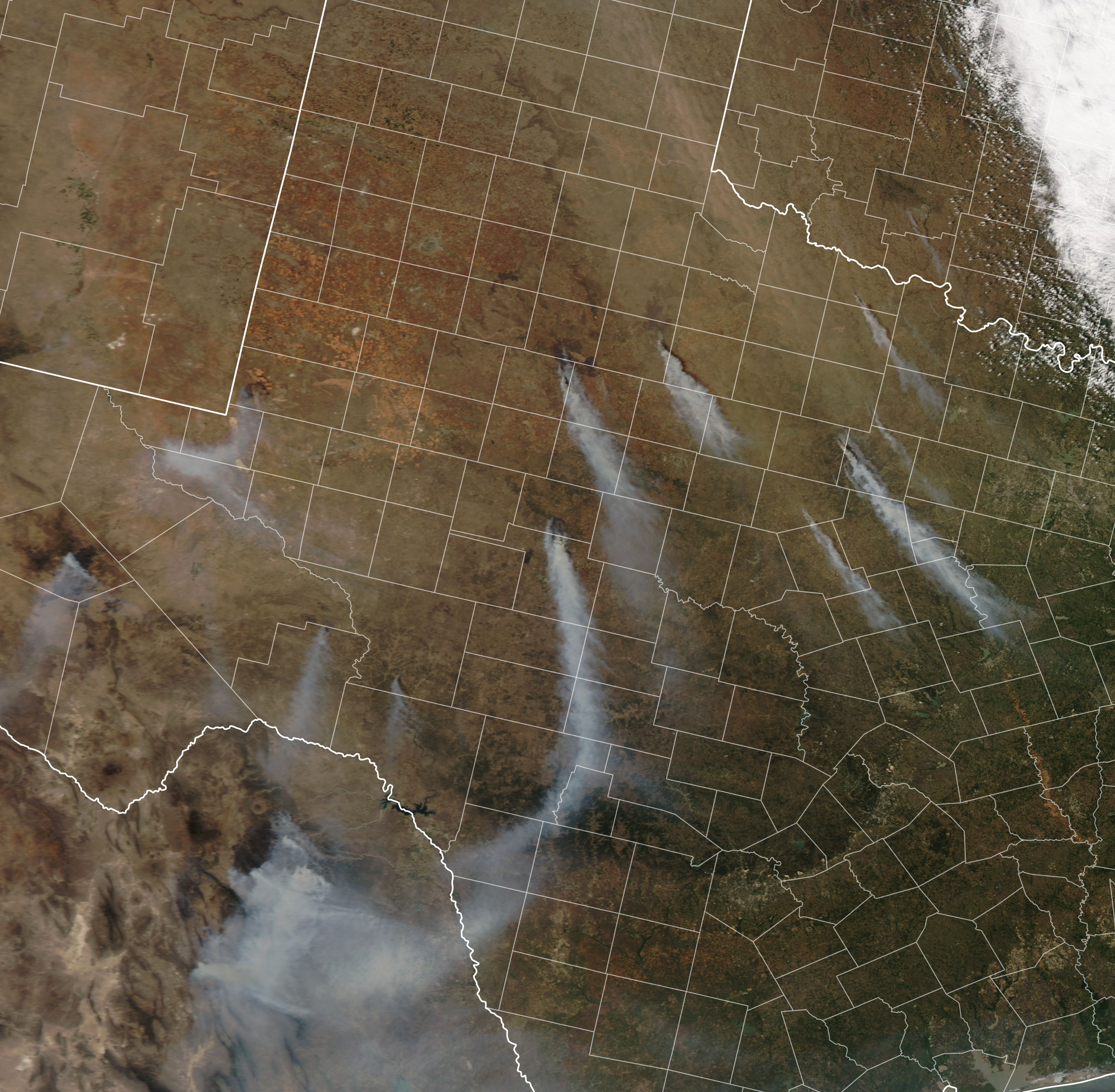
1	Rockhouse Fire
2	Frying Pan Ranch
3	Wildcat Fire
4	Cooper Mountain Ranch Fire
5	Swenson Fire
6	Possum Kingdom Complex
An April 15, 2011 satellite image of several active wildfires over West Texas with smoke blown towards the southeast

Statistics
- Total fires: 31,453
- Total area: 4,011,709 acres (1,623,481 ha)

Impacts
- Deaths: 10 total (6 civilians, 4 firefighters)
- Injuries: 62
- Cost: $513.9 million (2011 USD)

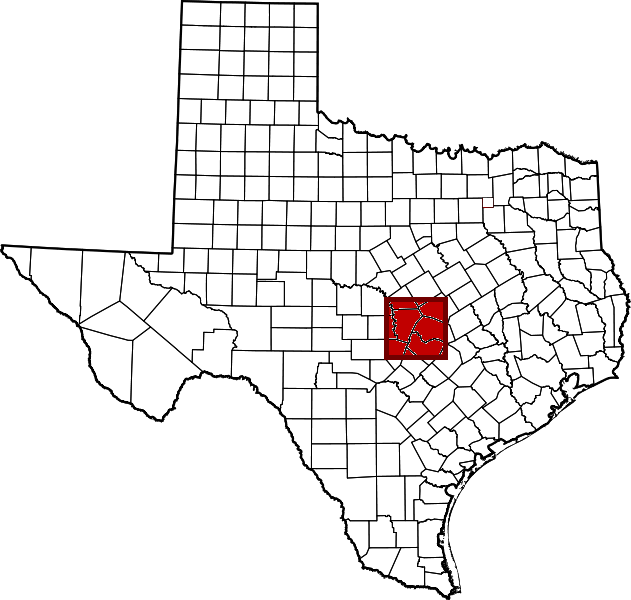
By October 16, 2011, about 3,853,475 acres (1,559,446 ha) of Texas had burned in a single fire season, equivalent to a square of about 77.5 by 77.5 miles (124.7 by 124.7 km).

The 2011 Texas wildfires were a series of destructive wildfires in Texas that occurred during the 2011 fire season. During 2011 in Texas, around 31,453 fires had burned 4,000,000 acres or 16,190 square kilometres (about double the previous record), 2,947 homes (1,939 of which were destroyed over the Labor Day weekend), and over 2,700 other structures. 47.3% of all acreage burned in The United States in 2011 was burned in Texas. The fires had been particularly severe due to the 2011 Southern US drought that covered the state, and was exacerbated by the unusual convergence of strong winds, unseasonably warm temperatures, and low humidity.

Timber lost to drought and wildfire in 2011 could have produced an estimated $1.6 billion worth of products, resulting in 3.4 billion dollars of economic impact in East Texas.

Firefighters from more than forty-three states were involved in combating the fires. Two firefighters were killed: Eastland volunteer firefighter Gregory M. Simmons, 51, died April 15 while battling a 3,000-acre (12 km^{2}) blaze Friday afternoon near Eastland; Cactus volunteer firefighter Elias Jaquez died April 20 from injuries sustained while fighting a blaze April 9 in Moore County.

On Sunday, September 4, 2011, a forest fire known as the Bastrop County Complex Fire engulfed rural areas to the east Bastrop, Texas, including the Tahitian Village development, and by September 30 had destroyed 1,645 homes, burned 34,068 acres, and killed two people. This fire is now regarded as the most catastrophic wildfire in Texas history.

Texas Governor Rick Perry declared a State of Disaster on December 21, 2010, and renewed the proclamation every month. On April 16, 2011, Perry asked that President Barack Obama declare 252 of 254 Texas counties as disaster areas due to wildfires and wildfire danger; the request was partially approved on July 1, 2011. Critics of the governor's relief efforts point to his budget cuts to the Texas Forest Service which provides a first line of defense against wildfires. Overall, wildfires in Texas during 2011 caused $510.927 million in damages and caused six fatalities, though an additional 62 people were injured.

== Background ==
The 2010 Texas wildfire season began on November 15. A La Niña weather pattern that began in the summer of 2010 brought widespread drought to Texas. The percentage of exceptional drought in the state was the highest since the United States Drought Monitor began tracking the data in 2000. A pattern of troughs from the Pacific Northwest brought strong winds over the plains. These weather conditions coupled with an above normal grass fuel loading created conditions for an active fire season.

== Notable fires ==
This is a list of known Texas wildfires occurring in 2011 that reached a size greater than 10,000 acres (40 km2) and/or caused significant destruction in residential areas.

=== Bastrop County Complex ===
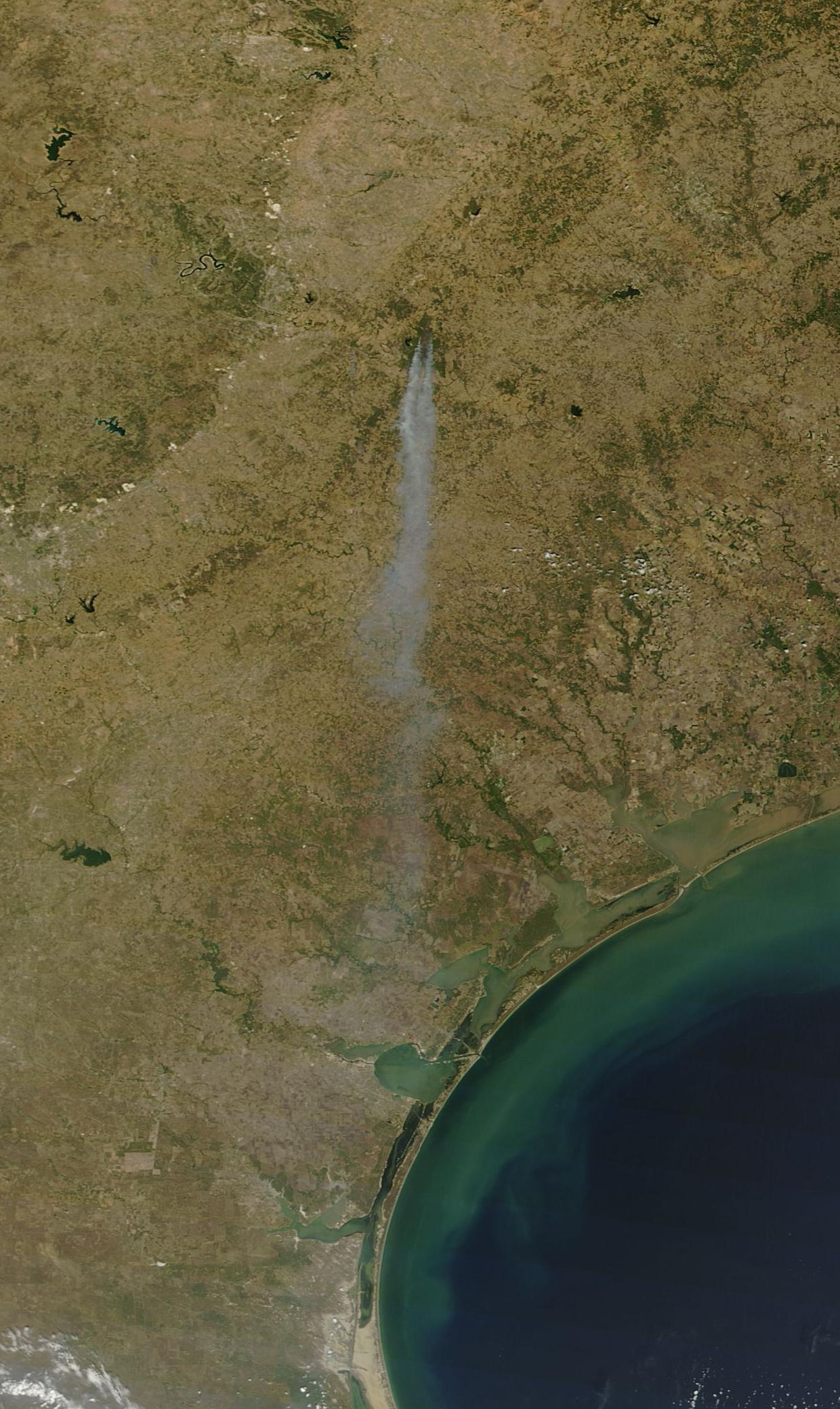
View of Bastrop Complex fire captured by Terra satellite, September 5, 2011

Due to the ongoing exceptional drought conditions in most of Texas and the high winds brought to the state by Tropical Storm Lee, a series of wildfires flared up over Labor Day weekend and continued into the following week. The largest and most destructive was what is now known as the Bastrop County Complex. At approximately 3:00 p.m. (CDT) on September 4, two fires started north of Bastrop State Park in the communities of Circle D-KC Estates and Tahitian Village. The likely cause of the blaze was sparks from electric power lines. 30 mph gusts of wind apparently toppled trees which tumbled into electrical lines at two locations, creating sparks that fell onto and ignited the dry grass and leaf litter below. The fire was exacerbated by the outflow of Tropical Storm Lee in conjunction with exceptional drought. The fire quickly spread, engulfing 400 homes. Multiple areas and locales were evacuated, including the Bastrop Animal Shelter, Bastrop State Park (more than half of which was burned), and other communities affected by the fire. By 7:30 PM on September 5, 2011, the fire had burned about 25,000 acres and 500 homes. Winds began to calm the evening of September 5, but the fire still had no containment by the evening of September 6. By September 11, 1,554 homes had been destroyed. By October 1, the fire had reached 98% containment but had burned a total of 34,068 acres and 1,645 homes, making it the most destructive fire in Texas history. At 8:00 PM on October 10, the fire was declared 100% contained.

==== Bear Creek Fire ====
On September 4, the largest fire in East Texas History began. Scorching more than 43,000 acres in Cass and Marion Counties. The fire took over 5 days to get under control involving numerous houses, and property. Multiple fire departments aided in the suppression efforts. A total of 91 structures were burned by the wildfire, amassing a damage toll of $6 million.

=== Colorado County Fire ===
On September 4, a fire started in Mentz, a rural community about 8 miles (13 km) northeast of Columbus, TX. The fire consumed 1800 acres, 11 homes, 40 outbuildings, and about 38 vehicles. The fire was contained a few days later.

=== Cooper Mountain Ranch Fire ===
Following a period of gusty conditions in mid-April, thunderstorms occurring between April 10–11 over West Texas initiated several wildfires. Among these was the Cooper Mountain Ranch Fire, which began from a lightning strike in 9 mi (14 km) south of Clairemont in southern Kent County. The fire ultimately spread to Fisher, Scurry, and Stonewall counties. On April 14, the city of Rotan was evacuated as the fire spread east, with one home destroyed near the county line between Kent and Stonewall counties; residents of Rotan returned to their homes after a few hours. A change in the winds to northerly caused the fire to spread south towards Camp Springs on April 18.

The fire was eventually contained on April 22 after burning 162,625 acres (65,812 ha) of grassland, resulting in $1.26 million in economic losses and the destruction of 350 utility poles. It was the sixth largest wildfire in Texas history. FEMA approved $1.35 million in assistance grants as a result of the fire.

=== Crockett Fires ===
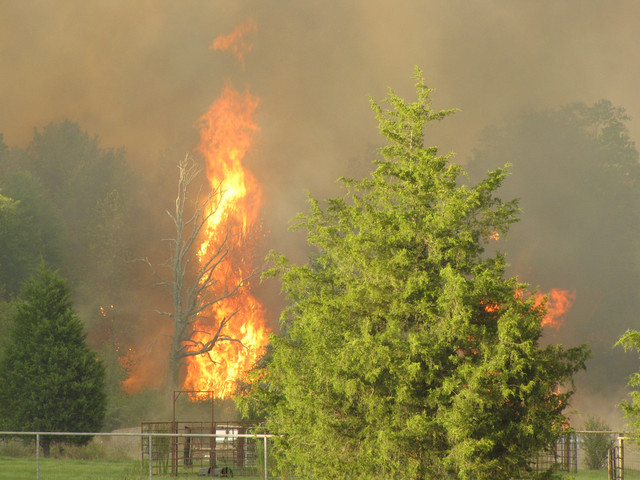
The fire along US 287

Fires burned between Texas 7 and US 287 and County Road 4505 but later jumped across to CR 4529. The cause of this fire is unknown. Another fire originally started in Anderson County but moved into Houston County near the Percilla Community. This fire was apparently caused by a downed power line.

=== Deaton Cole Fire ===
The grass fire in Val Verde County, 30 miles (48 km) southwest of Ozona burned 175,000 acres (710 km^{2}). The fire started on April 25 and the cause is unknown. The fire was controlled on May 10.

=== Delhi Fire ===
On September 4, a fire began near Jeddo, Texas in Caldwell County. The next day, 6 homes were burned, including 1,000 acres (4.0 km^{2}).

=== Dickens Complex ===
The Dickens Complex of fires in Dickens County consisted of the Edwards, Batch Camp, South Camp, and Afton fires. The fires were started by lightning strikes on May 7. The fires were contained on May 15 after burning 89,200 acres (361 km^{2}).

=== Encino Fire ===
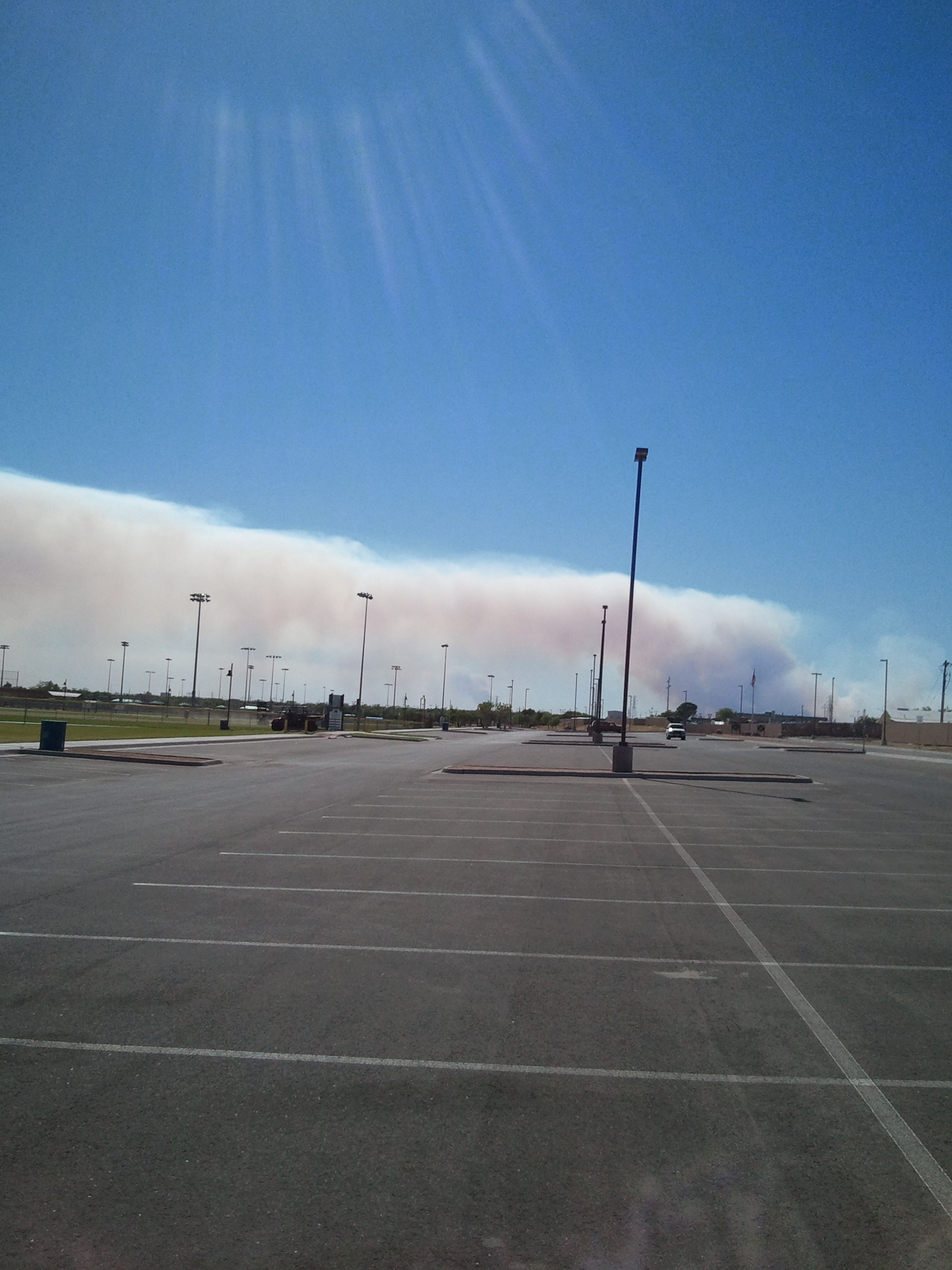
Smoke from the Encino Fire. Taken from the Texas Bank Sports Complex

The Encino Fire was located 15–20 miles (24–32 km) South of San Angelo. It started from a lightning strike during a thunderstorm. The fire consumed over 12,000 acres (49 km^{2}) but destroyed no buildings.

=== Moore Fire (Gladewater) ===
This fire, which was described by a longtime sheriff as "the fastest moving fire he had ever seen", burned 1,400 acres, destroying six houses and many barns. Outbuildings and pieces of equipment were also lost. More tragically, 2 fatalities occurred in a mobile home, when a mother and her 18-month-old daughter were unable to escape the fast moving blaze. A house mate was injured but was able to escape the blaze. The fires moved so quickly due to the extremely dry conditions and the high winds, sometimes reaching 40 mph. The fire was later extinguished despite state firefighting resources being stretched to their limits.

=== Griffith League Scout Ranch Fire ===
This fire started around 2 pm on October 4, 2011, at Oak Hill Cemetery Road, east of FM 2336, near the Griffith League Scout Ranch. It grew to 100 acres within two hours, 1,000 acres by nightfall. The outbreak was 25% contained by 8:30pm following the efforts of seven bulldozers and over 30 fire trucks with assistance from four aircraft that dumped 90,000 gallons of fire retardant onto the blaze. As of the morning of October 5, 50 homes had been evacuated.

The 5,000-acre ranch had already lost approximately 1,000 acres to fire on September 4 and 5. 350 acres had burned previously in a wildfire on August 21, 2010.

=== Hodde Lane Fire ===
On September 4th, 2011 a series of wildfires started in the Pflugerville, Texas area. The day began with the Pfluger Fire which was located in downtown Pflugerville, and the Gattlinberg Fire later on in the day. The third and largest wildfire was named the Hodde Lane Fire, and was located just east of Pflugerville. The fire eventually grew to approximately 300 acres, and approixmately 300 homes were evaucated. Ultimately, three structures were burned. Texas Forest Service dozers responded from Bastrop (before the Bastrop fire started), two Starflight helicopters, and over 70 units from the region responded to the fire.

=== Horseshoe Fire ===
On August 15, 2011, a wildfire broke out in central Leander, Texas. 189 homes in the surrounding area were immediately evacuated. The fire burned 30 acres in total and raced through a mobile-home neighborhood, destroying 15 homes and multiple vehicles. Since it broke out on Horseshoe Drive, it is known as the Horseshoe Fire. This was the first of two destructive fires Leander experienced within three weeks, the second being the Moonglow Fire.

=== Iron Mountain Fire ===
The cause of the Iron Mountain Fire is unknown. The fire started on May 9 in Brewster County about 25 miles (40 km) east of Alpine eventually getting to within 10 miles (16 km) of the town. The fire burned over 89,400 acres (362 km^{2}).

=== Moonglow Fire ===
On September 5, a wildfire broke out in the Mason Creek North subdivision (on Moonglow Drive) in Leander. Police declared the cause to be arson. The fire destroyed 11 homes and damaged nine. The Moonglow fire was the second destructive wildfire Leander had experienced within three weeks, leading the Leander City Council to declare the city a disaster area shortly thereafter.

=== Pedernales Bend Fire ===
The Pedernales Bend Fire (also known as the Spicewood fire and Pedernales Fire One) was a fire that began on September 4 near Lake Travis. Fanned by strong winds, the fire quickly grew, forcing residents in a 3 miles (4.8 km) radius of the fire to evacuate the area. By the end of the day, the fire was estimated to have engulfed 400 acres (1.6 km^{2}). The next day, the fire already destroyed 20 homes and moved across the Pedernales River, continuing to burn in Hays County. Most of the fire moved to the west of the river, where it destroyed an additional 65 structures and engulfed a total of 6,400 acres (26 km^{2}). The fire also cut power from 545 homes. However, the growing fire slowed down as it was quickly contained, and on September 7, the fire was completely contained. In total, 65 structures were destroyed, including 34 homes. The fire burned 6,400 acres (26 km^{2}) in total.

=== Possum Kingdom Complex ===
The Possum Kingdom Complex is a grouping of four wildfires that has consumed about 148,000 acres (600 km^{2}) in Stephens, Young and Palo Pinto counties. The complex consists of the Possum Kingdom West Fire (90,000 acres), Possum Kingdom East Fire 11,000 acres (45 km^{2}), Hohertz Fire 40,000 acres (160 km^{2}) and Jackson Ranch Fire 7,000 acres (28 km^{2}). The fire destroyed 166 homes and two churches. 600 more homes were threatened. Possum Kingdom State Park was closed on April 15. Ninety percent of the park was involved in the fire. 450 firefighters, three helitankers and three helicopters fought the fire along a 270-mile (430 km) fire line.

On August 30, 2011, another outbreak of wildfires ravaged the Possum Kingdom Lake area, continuing well into September and destroying 39 homes by the time of containment.

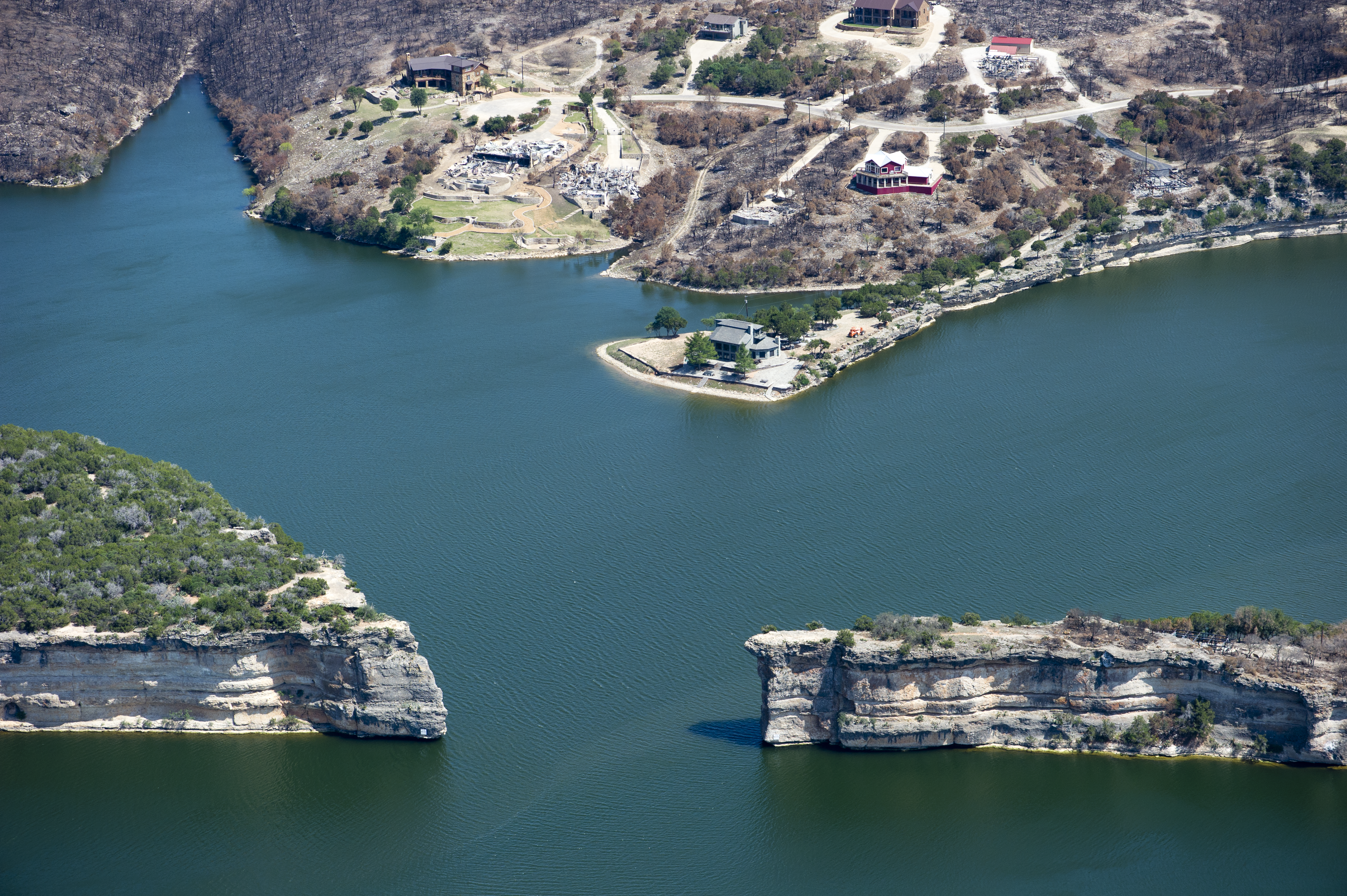
Possum Kingdom Lake after the fire

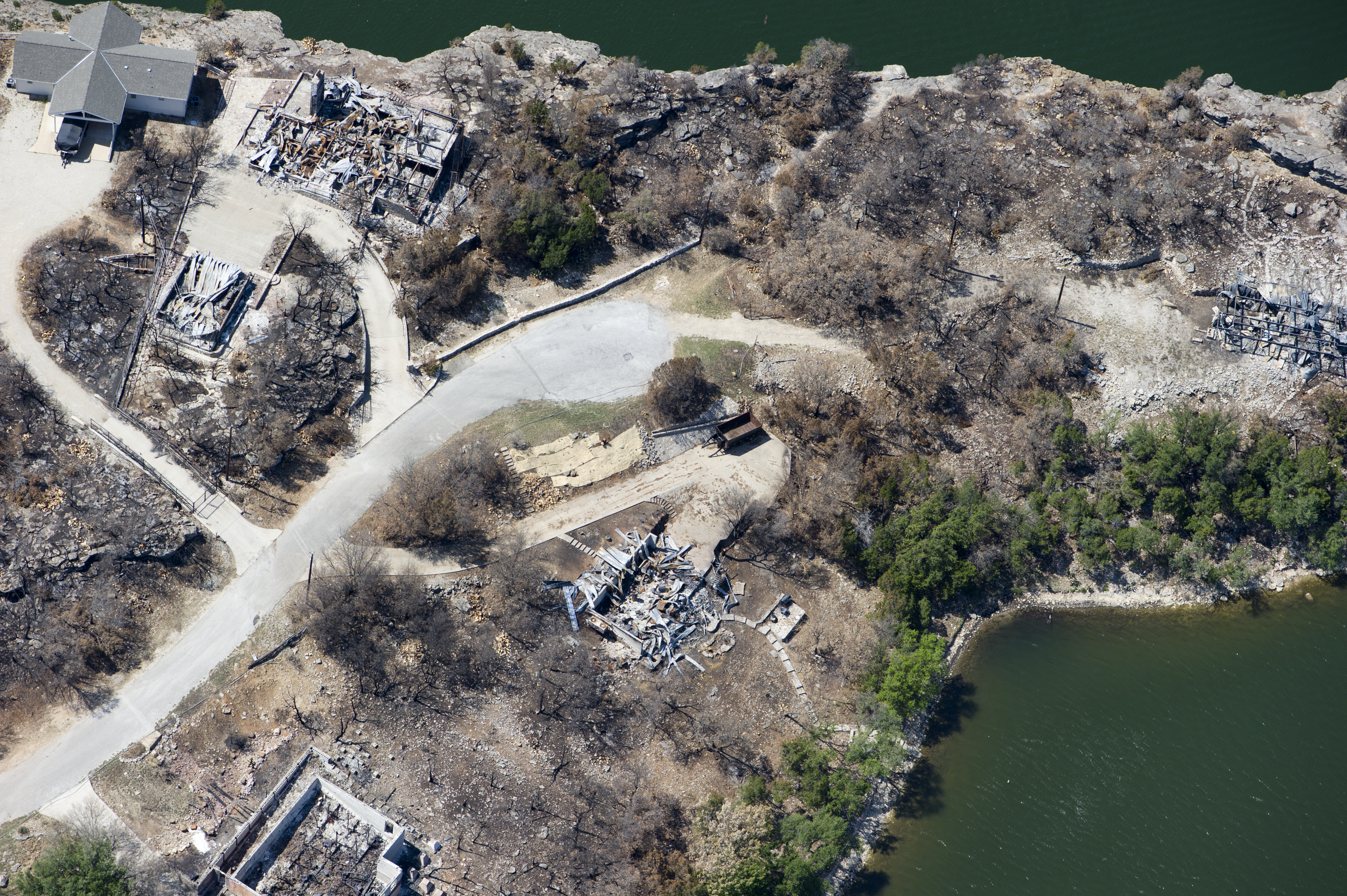
Close-up of destroyed houses near Possum Kingdom Lake

=== Riley Road Fire ===
The Riley Road Fire started on September 5 in Grimes County and quickly spread South with the aid of high winds crossing over into Waller County. Within three days, the fire had scorched at least 12,500 acres and destroyed over 100 homes in Grimes, Montgomery and Waller counties. By September 10, the fire had been 100% contained and burned out with no further damage.

=== Rock House Fire ===
The Rock House Fire began on April 9 west of Marfa. An electrical short in an abandoned building is believed to have started the fire. The fire burned more than 314,444 acres (1,272.51 km^{2}) across Presidio and Jeff Davis counties. The fire destroyed 24 homes and two businesses, and killed herds of cattle and 4 horses. On April 10, Davis Mountains State Park was closed indefinitely due to the proximity of the fire. The park was used as a staging and camping area for firefighters for the duration of the fire. Texas State Highway 118 was also closed at several times during the fire.

=== Scenic Brook Fire ===
On the morning of April 17, Michael Weathers, a homeless man, started a campfire to cook his breakfast. He later left the campfire unattended, and the hot coals started a fire that spread into the Scenic Brook neighborhood in Austin. Two C-130 airplanes dispersed fire retardant chemicals. Police and EMS helicopters equipped with buckets dropped water on the blaze. The fire covered about 100 acres (0.40 km^{2}), destroyed 11 homes and damaged 10 others. Weathers was arrested and charged with arson.

=== Schwartz Fire ===
The Schwartz Fire started May 7 and the cause is still under investigation. Conditions optimal for wildfires were in place at the time of the fire with temperatures over 100 °F (38 °C), relative humidity values near 5 percent, and gusts as strong as 35 mph (56 km/h). The fire began 20 miles (32 km) east of Marathon in Brewster County and burned about 83,000 acres (340 km^{2}). Two structures were directly threatened by the fire and another sixteen indirectly, but none structures were lost.

=== Swenson Fire ===
Sparks from a cutting torch started the Swenson Fire on April 6 near Aspermont and burned 122,500 acres (496 km^{2}) in King, Knox, and Stonewall counties but caused minimal structure damage. Two unoccupied houses were lost.

=== White Hat Fire ===
The White Hat Fire was started during the morning hours of June 20 about 8.5 mi (13.7 km) west of Blackwell, Texas in Nolan County. Bulldozers, fire engines, and heavy tankers were sent to handle the fire. However, towards the end of the day, no containment of the fire was reported, and it had already destroyed 7 houses and had enlarged to a size greater than 20,000 acres (81 km^{2}). Soon, residents east of the community of Maryneal would be evacuated. The next day, the fire continued to spread, reaching a size of 65,000 acres (260 km^{2}) and burning down an additional 5 structures. 100 firefighters were sent to battle the flames. On June 22, progress was made and the fire was 50% contained. Due to lower winds the next day, the fire decreased and became 70% contained, but it had already burned 70,900 acres (287 km^{2}) of land and charred 35 homes. The fire continued to decrease in size over the next days. On June 27, the fire was declared fully contained after burning 72,473 acres (293.29 km^{2}).

=== Wildcat Fire ===
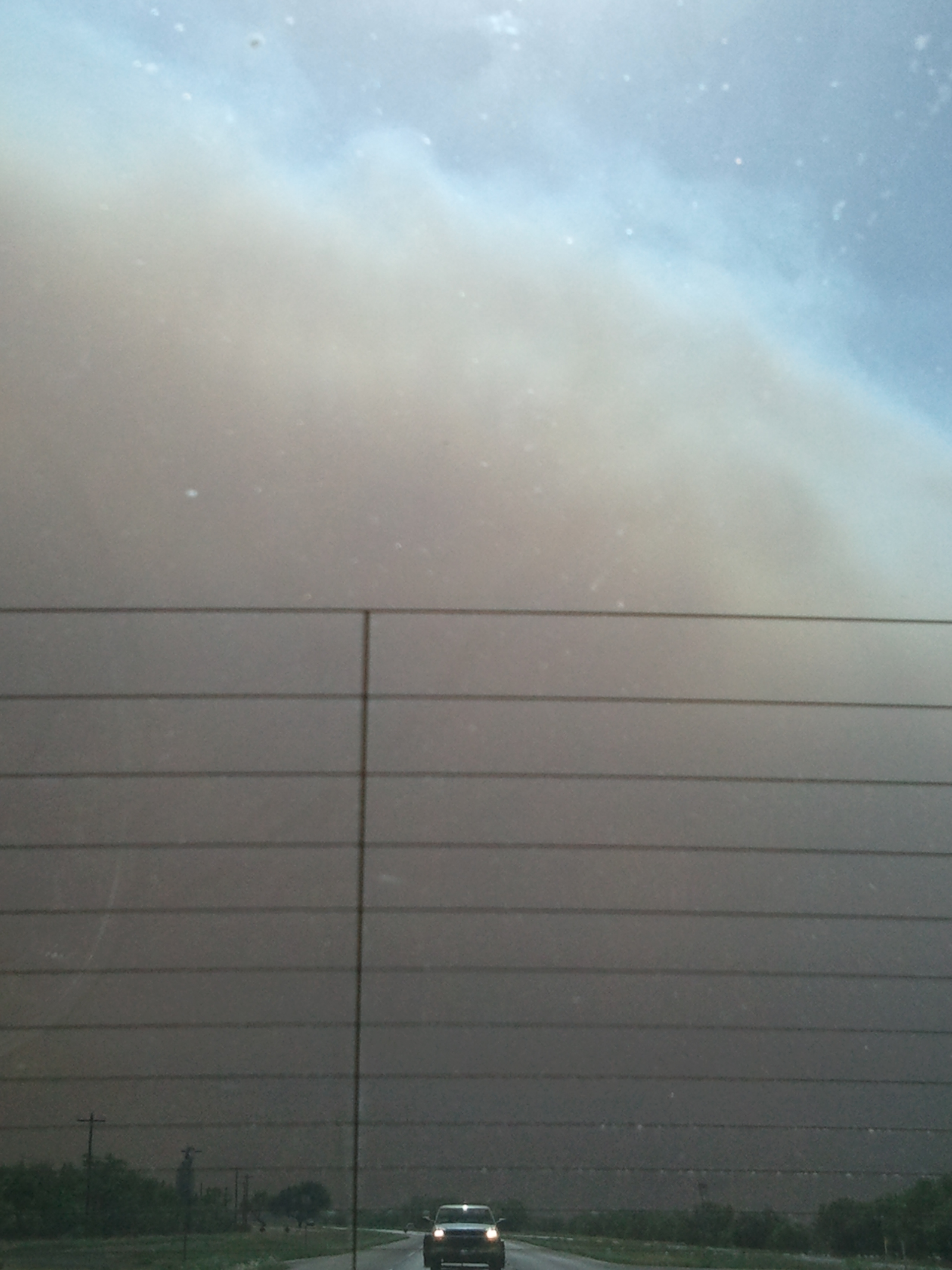
Smoke from the Wildcat Fire seen from U.S. 67 near Miles, Texas.

The Wildcat Fire started on April 11 at approximately 0030 from a lightning strike in southern Coke County west of Robert Lee. The fire was held within a 30-acre area until approximately 1630 on April 14. A wind shift coupled with increased wind speeds and rough terrain, enabled the fire to breach established fire lines. Forty mph winds pushed the fire east, reaching TX Hwy 208, before shifting to the south. The flame front was estimated to move at 400 ft per minute. Winds later shifted and pushed fire south. Local officials alerted residents of Grape Creek and Quail Valley, small communities north of San Angelo, to prepare for evacuation. By April 16, the winds again shifted and moved the fire north towards Robert Lee, forcing evacuations of the Edith community, and houses along both FM 2034 and Hwy 208 Texas State Highway 208. On April 17, Bronte was under a recommended evacuation, but the evacuation notice expired the same day. By April 18, the fire burned an estimated 100,000 acres (400 km^{2}), with a 10% containment, then the same day a confirmed 30% containment was stated. On April 21, the fire was at 75% containment, after burning 159,308 acres (644.70 km^{2}). Despite several structures being lost, mostly limited to outbuildings, isolated barns, and hunters' camps, the fire claimed only one unoccupied home.

== Wildfire summary ==
The following is a list of fires that burned more than 10,000 acres (4,000 ha), or produced significant structural damage or loss of life.

Name	County	Acres	Starting date	Containment date	Notes	Ref
Lipscomb County Complex	Lipscomb	15,908	February 16, 2011	February 16, 2011	The complex was composed of two fires—Higgins and FM3260—that both began and were contained nearly simultaneously.	
Matador Complex	Motley	41,000	February 27, 2011	February 28, 2011	The complex was the combination of at least two fires that began in western Motley County. One firefighter suffered minor injuries. At least two homes sustained severe damage.	
So Close	Borger	21,500	February 27, 2011	February 28, 2011	Five people were injured and twenty structures were damaged.	
Willow Creek South Complex	Potter	24,310	February 27, 2011	March 1, 2011	Twenty-nine homes were destroyed resulting in $10 million in damage.	
Locust Grove	Lipscomb	19,200	February 27, 2011	February 28, 2011	One structure was lost.	
—	Crockett	22,958	February 27, 2011	—N/a		
Mitchell County Complex	Mitchell	18,370	February 27, 2011	March 4, 2011		
Swenson	Stonewall	122,500	April 6, 2011	April 21, 2011	Economic damage was estimated at $2.54 million. Two homes were destroyed.	
Roper	Brewster	41,000	April 9, 2011	April 13, 2011		
Hickman	Midland	16,500	April 9, 2011	April 10, 2011	Five hundred people were evacuated and 34 homes were destroyed, causing $2.7 million in damage.	
Prentice	Terry	15,500	April 9, 2011	April 9, 2011	Three outbuildings and fifty utility poles were destroyed.	
Killough	Garza	54,500	April 9, 2011	April 14, 2011	One home and an oil field station were destroyed. The fire prompted the evacuation of sixty homes.	
Rockhouse	Presidio, Jeff Davis	314,444	April 9, 2011	May 12, 2011	The fire destroyed 41 homes while another 260 were saved. The damage toll reached $5 million and several heads of cattle and animals were killed. At the time, the wildfire was the second largest in Texas history.	
Crawford Ranch	Moore	35,097	April 9, 2011	April 10, 2011	Four firefighters were injured, though one later died of his injuries.	
—	Hartley	12,234	April 9, 2011	April 10, 2011	Was the combination of two fires.	
Possum Kingdom Complex	Palo Pinto, Stephens	126,734	April 9, 2011	April 29, 2011	Four fires that began in two counties combined over the course of ten days. Ninety percent of Possum Kingdom State Park was burned by the wildfires, as well as 167 homes and 2 churches, resulting in over $150 million in damage.	
Wildcat	Tom Green	159,308	April 10, 2011	—N/a	Prompted the evacuations of several communities north of San Angelo, Texas.	
Encino	Tom Green	12,659	April 10, 2011	—N/a	Two homes were damaged.	
Sutton	Crockett	30,814	April 10, 2011	April 23, 2011		
Cooper Mountain Ranch	Kent	162,625	April 11, 2011	April 22, 2011	Five homes were destroyed by the fire.	
Cannon	Pecos	63,427	April 12, 2011	April 30, 2011		
Frying Pan Ranch	Andrews	80,907	April 14, 2011	April 21, 2011		
Deaton Cole	Val Verde	175,000	April 25, 2011	May 10, 2011		
C-Bar	Crane	13,000	April 26, 2011	April 28, 2011	Later merged with the Pleasant Farms fire.	
Scott Ranch	Irion	11,233	April 26, 2011	May 2, 2011	Destroyed several utility poles.	
Dickens Complex	Dickens	90,000	May 6, 2011	May 11, 2011	Two sheds were burned following the combination of several wildfires.	
Schwartz	Brewster	83,000	May 7, 2011	May 22, 2011		
Iron Mountain	Brewster	80,000	May 9, 2011	May 22, 2011		
Derick	Andrews	25,000	May 24, 2011	May 25, 2011	The fire destroyed 110 power poles.	
Canyon	Randall	16,373	May 24, 2011	May 27, 2011	One home was destroyed. A church camp lost two cottages and two storage buildings in addition to other structures on the campgrounds. Damage was estimated at $1.5 million.	
FM 296	Dallam	15,000	May 24, 2011	May 25, 2011		
Dos Amigos	Coke	19,391	June 8, 2011	June 16, 2011	Vehicles and a deer camp were destroyed by the fire.	
—	Motley	30,000	June 11, 2011	June 12, 2011		
Smac Ranch	Brooks	32,000	June 18, 2011	June 22, 2011	The fire impacted several ranches and deer hunting camp structures.	
Bear Creek	Cass	41,000	September 2, 2011	September 13, 2011	Largest fire in East Texas history. Ninety-one structures were burned and one person was injured, with a total damage toll of $6 million.	
Bastrop County Complex	Bastrop	34,068	September 4, 2011	October 10, 2011	Most destructive fire in Texas history, with 1,669 homes and 40 commercial buildings destroyed and a damage toll of $250 million. Two people were killed.	
Riley Road	Grimes	18,960	September 5, 2011	September 15, 2011	The fire destroyed 76 structures and damaged another 23.	

== Volunteers respond ==
Nearly 35,000 Texans are members of the state's 1,497 fully volunteer fire departments (VFDs) and 292 combined volunteer and paid departments. Those combination departments have about 6,200 paid firefighters, while the state's 139 fully paid departments have more than 19,500 firefighters primarily focused on protecting the state's municipalities, according to Texas Forest Service records. While some state and federal grant funding is available for fire departments, most fire protection is funded at a local level through taxation or donations.

== See also ==
- Days of Prayer for Rain in the State of Texas
