= 2012 Oklahoma wildfires =

Series of wildfire in Oklahoma

- Date: July 3, 2012 – August 14, 2012; (CDT (UTC-5))
- Location: Throughout Oklahoma
- Coordinates: 35.5°N 98°W

Statistics
- Burned area: 52,000 acres (81.25 sq mi; 21,040 ha)

Impacts
- Deaths: 0
- Injuries: Unknown
- Structures destroyed: At least 121

Ignition
- Cause: Drought in the southern United States

The 2012 Oklahoma wildfires were a series of wildfires which impacted areas throughout the state of Oklahoma. Starting earlier in the year, a widespread drought caused many areas to be exposed to wildfires.

Starting in late July and early August, the wildfires burned at least 52,000 acres, and destroyed at least 121 homes and businesses. A wildfire near Luther in Central Oklahoma destroyed about 50 homes and other buildings before getting under control on August 4. Governor of Oklahoma Mary Fallin declared a state of emergency on July 30 due to the drought and wildfires.

Although property damage was substantial, no human lives due to the fires were reported. This may have been because a number of threatened communities were evacuated before fires reached them.

== Governor requests federal assistance ==
Governor Fallin submitted a major disaster request to FEMA on September 17, 2012, for the period July 28 - August 14, 2012. The request was for Federal assistance to three counties, (Note: Specifically, Creek, Cleveland and Pawnee County, Oklahoma) as well as statewide Hazard Mitigation. Joint Federal, State and local Preliminary Damage Assessments (PDAs) were conducted in the requested counties during September 18–24, 2012. (Note: FEMA explained that, "...PDAs estimate damages immediately after an event and are considered, along with several other factors, in determining whether a disaster is of such severity and magnitude that effective response is beyond the capabilities of the state and the affected local governments, and that Federal assistance is necessary.") Based on the PDAs, FEMA concluded that, "... the damage was not of such severity and magnitude as to be beyond the combined capabilities of the state and affected local governments," and thus Federal assistance was denied. Governor Fallin was informed of the decision on October 15, 2012.

Ongoing high winds have continued to affect Oklahoma. In Durant, high winds forced the Union Pacific Railroad to shut down one of their main railways through the town. In late November, Oklahoma State University researchers said that the wildfires and the ongoing drought were responsible for over $400 million in damages, harvest loss, and livestock loss.

== Additional fires ==
=== Glencoe fire ===
On August 4, 2012, a fire broke out near the community of Glencoe, in northern Payne County, Oklahoma that forced all of the residents to evacuate their homes. This fire soon burned more than 2,000 acres (8.1 km^{2}) and destroyed 53 homes. Unlike many of the fires, this blaze was blamed on human activity. Two companies had been conducting welding operations in the area, and were sued for damages. Outdoor welding was actually prohibited, because of a statewide burn ban that had gone into effect the previous day. Weather caused the fire to spread rapidly; the fire marshall of nearby Stillwater, Oklahoma said in an interview that the winds were blowing at 20 miles per hour (8.9 m/s) and that the high temperature was 107 degrees Fahrenheit. He said it was the 20th straight day of triple-digit temperatures. Only a late wind change spared the town from being totally destroyed.

In 2016, a jury decided that, "... IPS Engineering L.L.C. was responsible for 30 percent of the damage the wildfire caused, and Global Pipeline Construction LLC was responsible for the other 70 percent." The two companies were ordered to pay 72 plaintiffs a total of $6.5 million in compensation. In addition, IPS had to pay $1 million in punitive damages, and GPC was fined $100,000.

=== Luther fire ===
Luther, Oklahoma, a town in Oklahoma County just 24 miles (39 km) outside Oklahoma City, was severely damaged by a wildfire on August 3–4, 2012. The blazes covered 80,000 acres (320 km^{2}) and destroyed 24 houses before the winds abated sufficiently to bring the fire under control. Making the firefighters' work harder, the fire shut down Luther's municipal water pumps, forcing all residents to evacuate their homes. Gov. Mary Fallin visited the scene shortly afterward and told reporters that it was, "devastating."

Police said later that they had received reports that a man was seen throwing burning newspapers from the back of a truck in the area, and were treating the cause as possible arson.

=== Mannford fire ===
Another fire in Creek County during the same time period, this time near the community of Mannford, Oklahoma, about 20 miles (32 km) west of Tulsa, burned nearly 100 square miles (260 km^{2}). A fire department spokesperson said that it was the largest wildfire in recent state history.

== See also ==
- Texas-Oklahoma wildfires of 2005–06
- 2010–13 Southern United States and Mexico drought
- 2012–13 North American drought
