= Bastrop State Park =

State park and historic site in Texas, United States

- U.S. National Register of Historic Places
- U.S. National Historic Landmark District
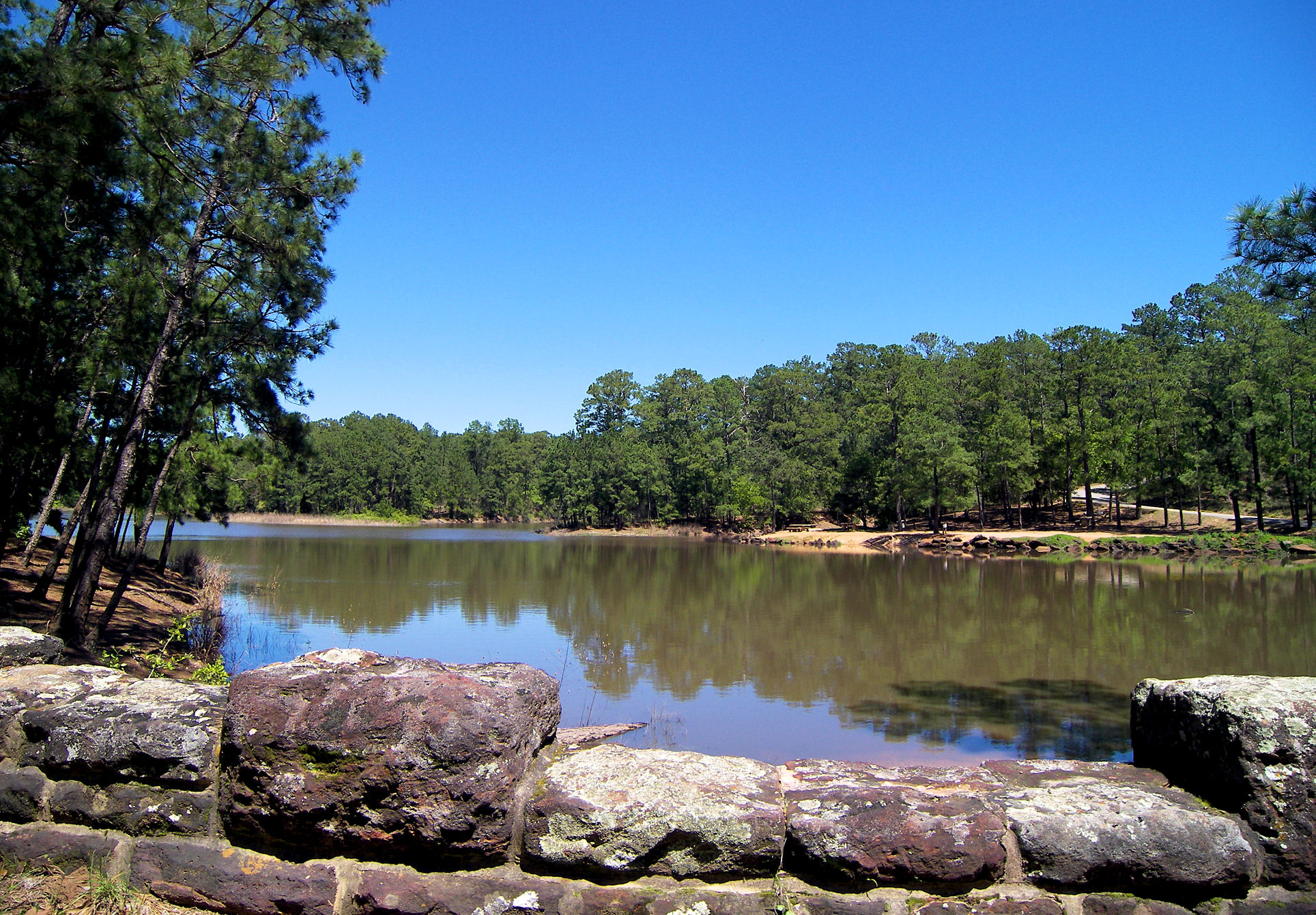
- Bastrop State Park Lake

- Location within Texas Location within the United States
- Nearest city: Bastrop, Texas, United States
- Coordinates: 30°6′39″N 97°16′25″W
- Area: 2,054 acres (831 ha)
- Built: 1933
- Architect: Arthur Fehr
- Architectural style: Bungalow/Craftsman, NPS Rustic
- Visitation: 133,102 (2025)
- Website: Bastrop State Park
- NRHP reference No.: 97001242

Significant dates
- Added to NRHP: September 25, 1997
- Designated NHLD: September 25, 1997

Bastrop State Park is a 2,054-acre (831 ha) state park in Bastrop County, Texas, United States managed by the Texas Parks and Wildlife Department. The park was established in 1933 and is notable for its stands of loblolly pines and the rustic architecture of many of its buildings. The park is a certified site of the El Camino Real de los Tejas National Historic Trail.

== History ==
=== Pre-foundation and construction ===
The Spanish travel route known as El Camino Real traversed through the area and aided in the early colonization of Texas in the 1700s. The city of Bastrop, Texas, established in 1832, depended on the natural resources of the area for regional growth; Bastrop's timber harvest from pines fueled construction in Austin, San Antonio, and northern Mexico. Long before the park's construction began, citizens of Bastrop and Smithville recognized that the land was worth preserving and kept it as an informal recreational area supervised by a local hunting and fishing organization. The land had also served unsuccessfully as a private resort area.

In the early 1930s, during the peak of the Great Depression, US President Franklin D. Roosevelt created a public works organization known as the Civilian Conservation Corps (CCC) to put young men to work and preserve the country's natural resources, create public recreational areas, and boost the economy. In 1933, with the help of the National Park Service (NPS) and the Texas Parks and Wildlife Department (TPWD), the CCC began the development of Bastrop State Park. When the CCC expressed interest in transforming the local pine forest area, several residents of Bastrop and Smithville donated about 2,100 acres (850 hectares) of land to the state government.

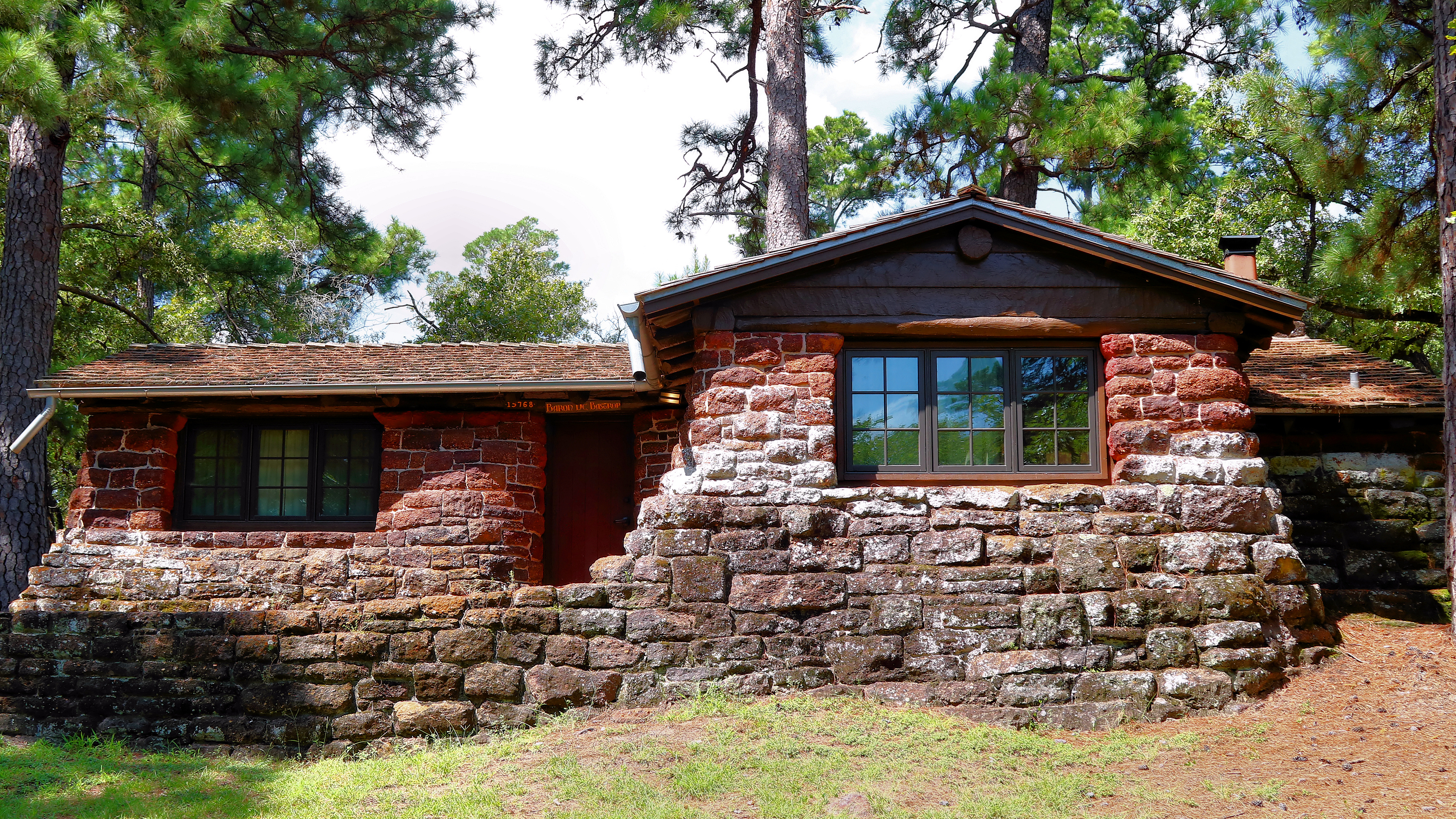
One of the stone cabins built by the Civilian Conservation Corps circa 1935.

Companies 1805 and 1811 of the CCC built many of the park facilities between 1933 and 1939 using native stone to blend with the landscape. The facilities were designed by architect Arthur Fehr and were considered a showcase of park architecture when built. Following the principles of the NPS, Fehr wanted the park's facilities to have harmony with its surrounding landscape of hills and forests, and used native materials for construction. The stone cabins at Bastrop State Park are intentionally blended and appear to come out of the ground like a natural outcrop. This same non-intrusive design was used for the park's dams, bridges, culverts, and fences. These architectural features served as a role model for later park development by the CCC across the entire US. By using the location's natural materials, the CCC was also able to keep construction costs down and reduced the need for importing materials from other areas.

Among the CCC's main duties in the early phases of the state park's construction was seeding, transplanting, and clearing tangles of brush and fallen timber. They also constructed twelve stone and timber cabins, several utility buildings, a lake, and several landscaping structures. Both CCC companies stayed at the park until 1939 before moving to other state parks to continue their preservation efforts. Two other Depression-era groups, the National Youth Administration (NYA) and the Works Progress Administration (WPA), helped improve Bastrop State Park's facilities. The NYA built and used a maintenance building to construct furniture for the CCC to use for several Texas state parks, including Bastrop's. Moreover, the WPA built a swimming pool and the original nine-hole golf course in two separate projects with the supervision of the TPWD. In land, labor, and material, Bastrop State Park cost about US$1,500,000 (approximately US$34,247,076 in 2022) once completed.

=== Inauguration and early years ===
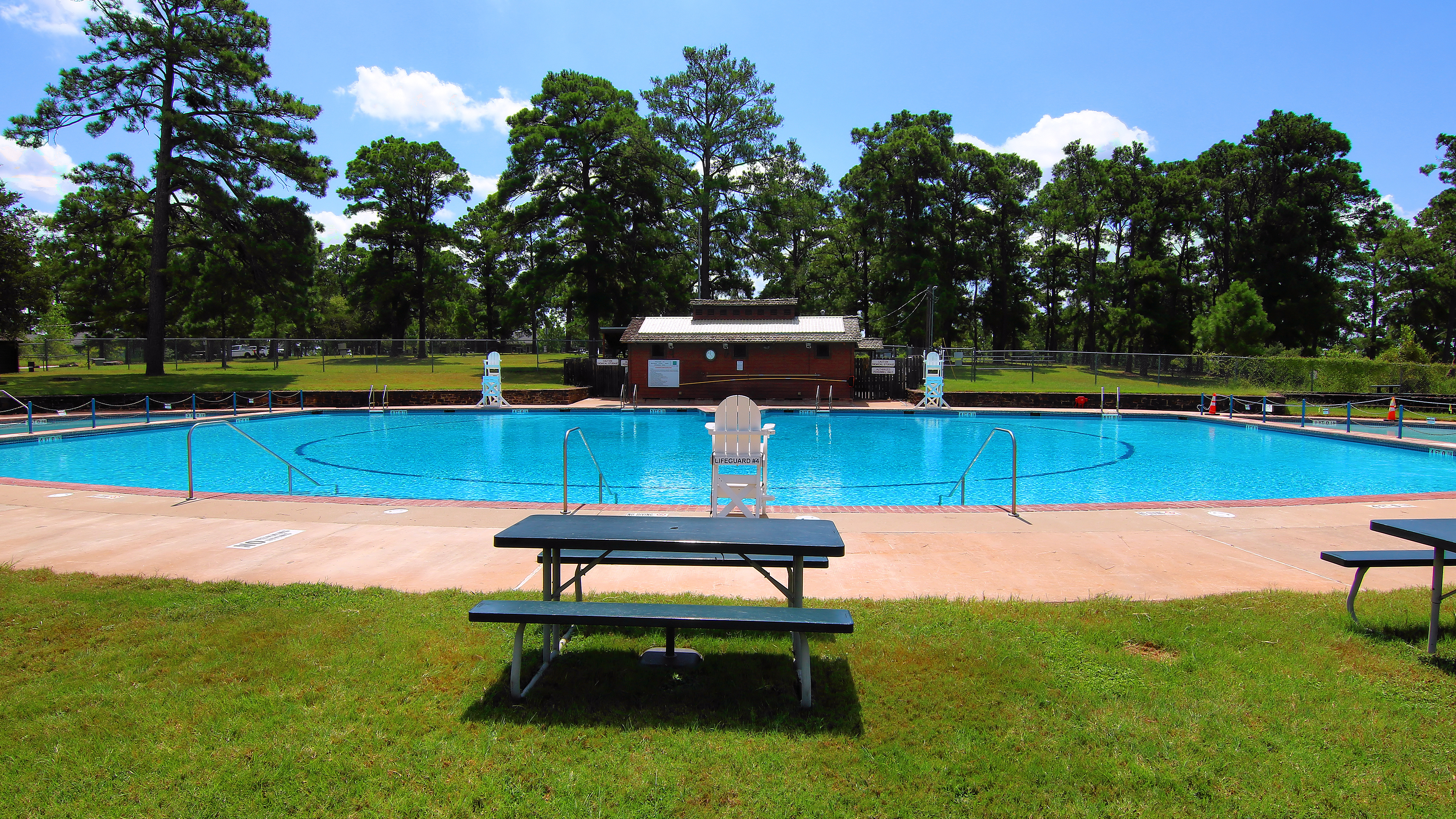
The WPA built swimming pool is a popular amenity in the park.

Once completed and opened to the public, Bastrop State Park received national recognition due to its natural landscapes and architectural displays. It also became the keystone of Bastrop's economy during its early days as many park attendees also visited Bastrop while visiting Bastrop State Park. It also served as a major recreation area for nearby residents and organizations. In 1936, Bastrop State Park was invited to the Texas Centennial Exposition at The University of Texas at Austin (UT Austin) campus to celebrate the 100th anniversary of Texas's independence from Mexico. Park architect Fehr, construction foreman J. R. Pfeiffer, and superintendent A. R. Henry attended the event and participated in a botanical exhibition, where they delivered a large red cedar tree of 20 in (51 cm) in diameter to the university. The tree was received by Dr. G. W. Goldsmith, who supervised the botanical exhibition. Bastrop State Park confirmed that the tree was a gift to the university. By 1937, Bastrop State Park's visitor attendance was high; it average close to 3,000 visitors a week during the summer months, according to park entrance figures provided by the CCC. Registry records show that visitors from 16 US states and from 69 Texas counties visited the park, in addition to those in the Bastrop and surrounding areas.

To booster sales, Bastrop State Park partnered with the Bastrop Chamber of Commerce in November 1948 to create custom license plates displaying the park. They launched this initiative to encourage all county drivers to display Bastrop State Park on their vehicles. There plates were available for purchase at the chamber's office in downtown Bastrop. In January 1949, funds totaling US$135,795 were approved for Bastrop State Park and three other Texas state parks: Lockhart, Blanco, and Inks Lake. At least $70,080 of it was used in Bastrop to create new buildings, improve the pool and creeks, roads and fences, create playgrounds and foot bridges, as well as other amenities. In addition to the funds received, Bastrop State Park was assessed as the second most-valued state park in Texas in May 1950 with US$502,688 (about US$6,216,018 in 2023) in appraised park equipment. In November, the Fifty-first Texas Legislature approved US$200,000 in funds for six Texas state parks, including Bastrop's. The funds were used to create campground sites; the first camp facility was made in Bastrop State Park with surplus buildings from Camp Swift, followed by Bonham, Caddo Lake, Cleburne, Fort Parker, and Lake Corpus Christi.

From 5–9 October 1950, Bastrop State Park was the site of the annual National Conference of State Parks. Approximately 400 delegates from all US states, including 100 from Texas state parks, were invited to attend. Most of the delegates from out-of-state were invited to stay at Bastrop State Park. During the sessions, they discussed for better ways to work together and affiliate with other state parks across the US. Several distinguished speakers, including Texas House of Representative speaker Homer L. Leonard, Texan folklorist J. Frank Dobie, and former Governors of Texas Allan Shivers and Pat Morris Neff, were also invited. After a weekend in Bastrop and the surrounding areas, the conference would conclude at Big Bend National Park, where US President Harry S. Truman was invited to attend. The annual conference was open to the public. A. H. Elliot, the Bastrop State Park superintendent, was responsible for the arrangements of the convention. Frank David Quinn, a member of the Texas State Parks Board, was elected president of the National Conference of State Parks during the Bastrop conference.

=== Modern era ===
In February 1962, the Texas State Parks Board announced that they were combining management operations of Bastrop State Park and the adjoining Buescher State Park for at least a year. They appointed Thurman L. Williams as the new park ranger; he had previously served as the ranger at Buescher. The former ranger of Bastrop State Park, Ranger Williams, was moved to a full-time staff manager to supervise the parks' cabins, the swimming pool, golf course, group camping areas, and all other facilities at both parks. When this decision was made, Bastrop State Park was one of the most visited state parks in Texas. It registered 157,042 attendants the year before this new management. Buescher State Park, however, had fewer accommodations and registered fewer visitors. In August, the Texas State Parks Board approved US$630,000 in funding for six state parks, including Bastrop's, and proposed a US$4,959,631 biennial budget for the Texas Legislature's consideration. The funding was mostly used for park improvements. Bastrop State Park received US$24,000 for water system improvements.

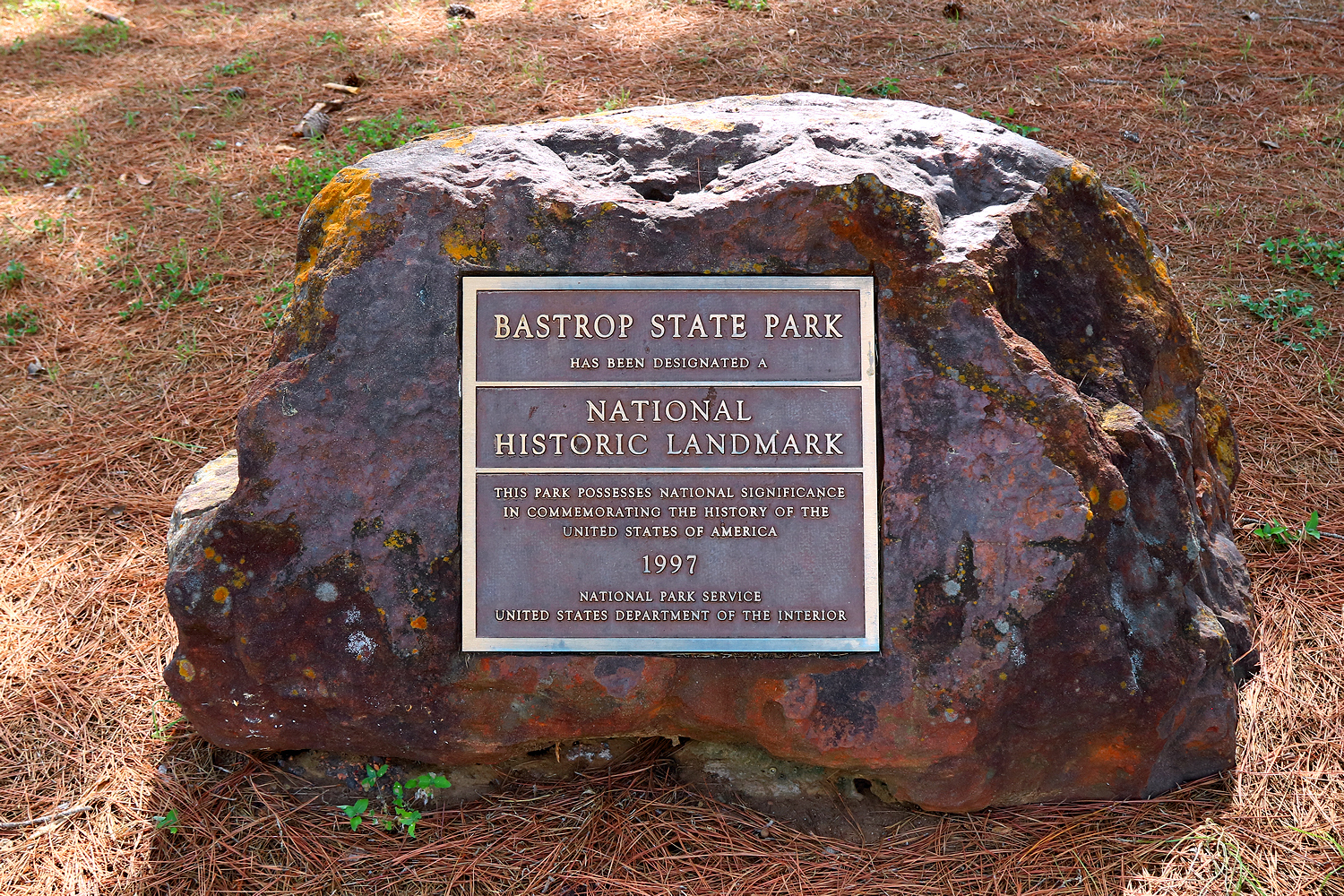
The National Historic Landmark plaque placed in the park.

In September 1962, park officials said that attendance at Bastrop State Park was starting to have a notable reduction. They speculated that park's rundown conditions and needed repairs drove visitors to other parks with better conditions. The parks with the highest attendance were those that offered quality, overnight stay options for campers. Bastrop State Park's overnight camping grounds were not up to par with other parks. A factor for this was because Bastrop State Park was not originally built for overnight stay or to accommodate a large influx of campers. When the park was originally made, the intention was to provide picnic facilities, playgrounds, swimming pools, and other recreational areas similar to a city park. As consumer preferences changed in the 1960s, with a higher preference for camping instead of picnicking, attendance dropped at Bastrop State Park. The park later included overnight camping options but remained below par compared to other parks in the US. Moreover, the first overnight camping groups were close to picking areas, which bothered campers who preferred quieter areas and privacy.

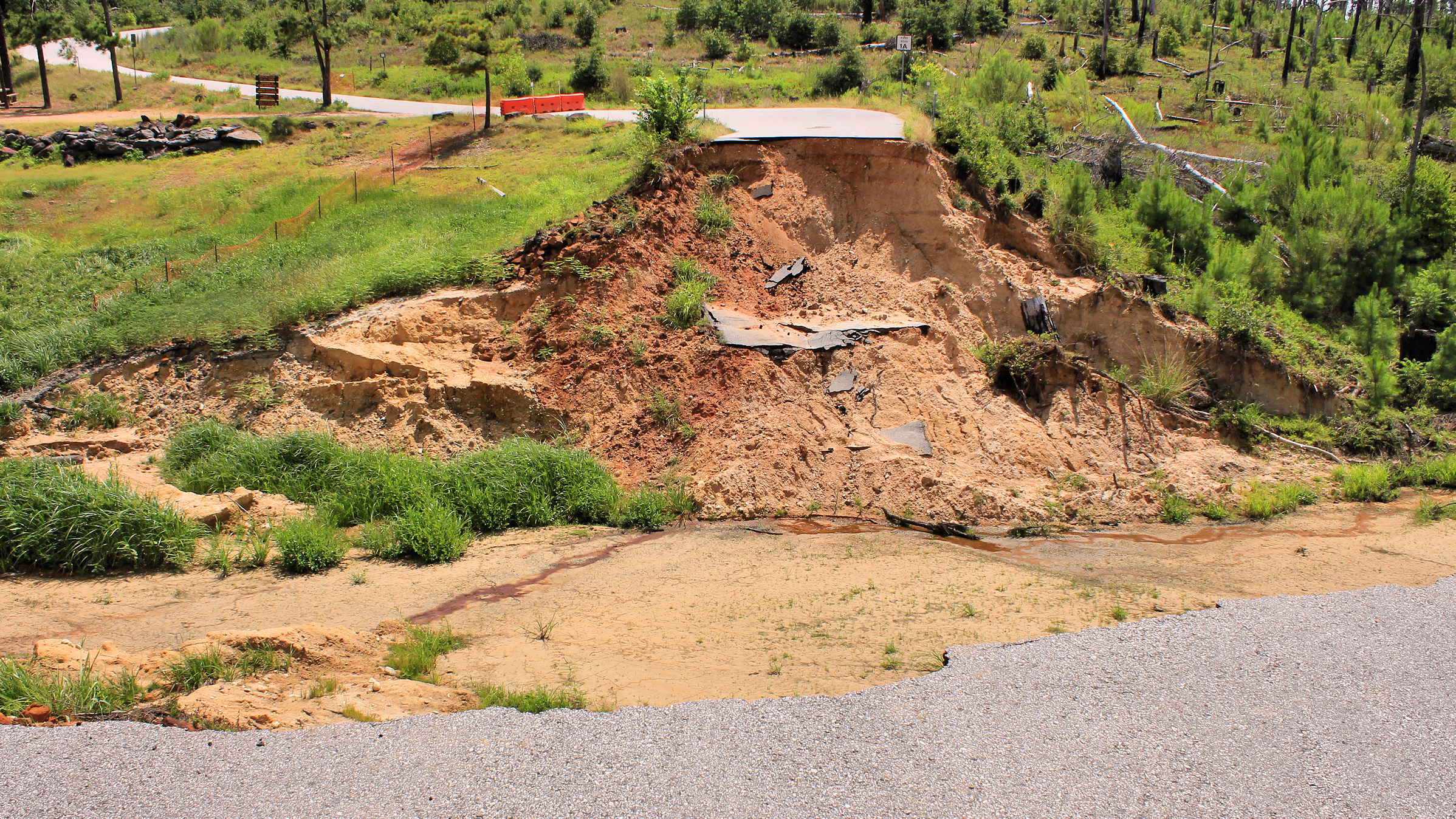
The dam failure in 2015 emptied Bastrop State Park Lake and cut off the northern access to the Park Road 1A loop.

In 1997, Bastrop State Park was awarded the National Historic Landmark status mostly due to its enduring craftsmanship and landscape work done by the CCC. It was one of the five CCC parks in the US that held this recognition.

The State of Texas purchased an additional 1,450 acres (590 ha) in 1979 and another 1,000 acres (400 ha) in 2000 to expand the golf course from 9 to 18 holes. Subsequent land purchases by the state in 2001 brought the park to its current size of 5,926 acres (2,398 ha).

On May 25, 2015, the earthen dam impounding Bastrop State Park Lake failed after hours of heavy rain in the area. The lake emptied and flooded across Texas State Highway 71. The water moved through a subdivision south of the highway and emptied into the Colorado River.

== Features and amenities ==
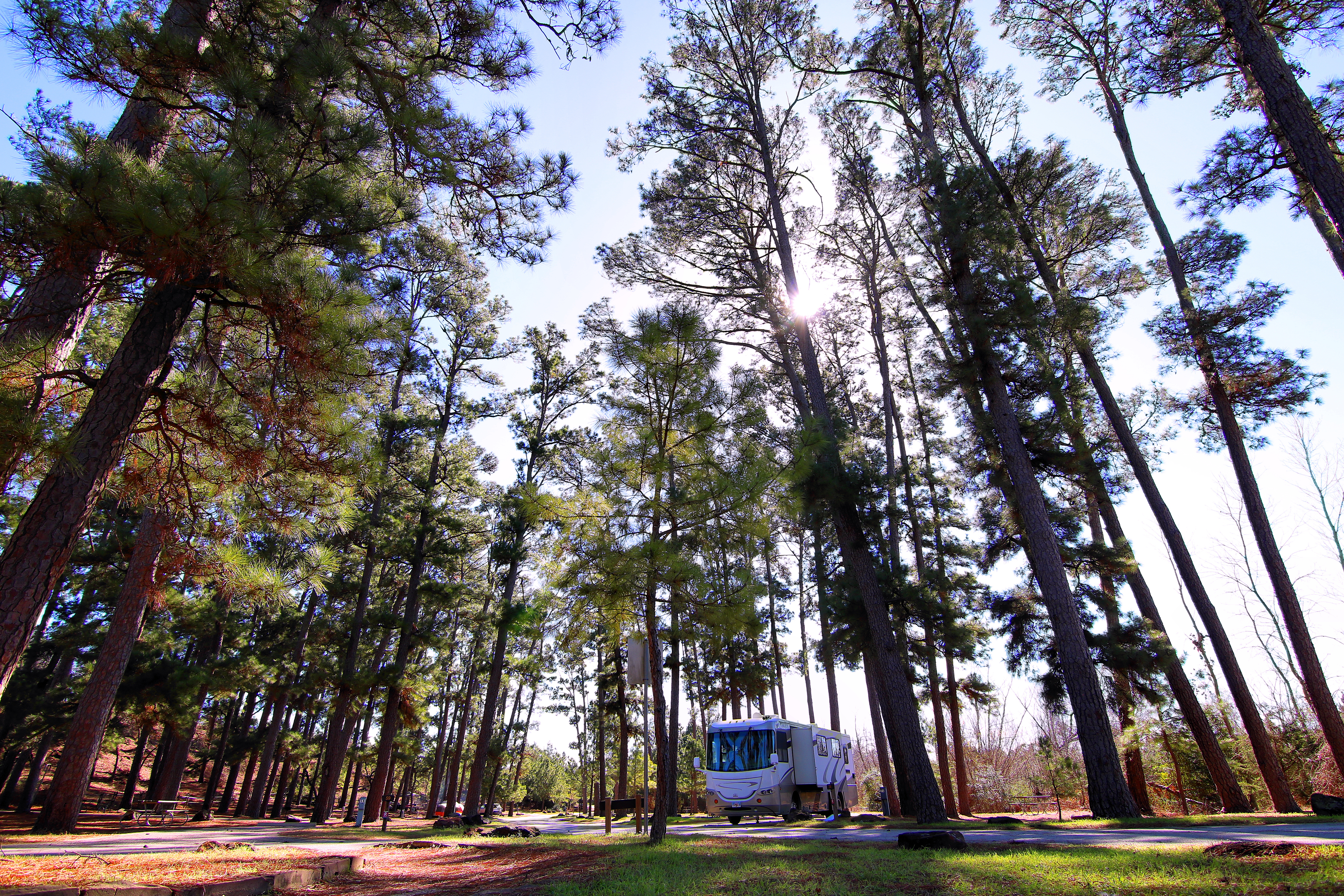
The Copperas Creek Camping Area and its majestic loblolly pines.

Since its creation, Bastrop State Park has been a popular outdoors getaway destination for Texas residents, students from The University of Texas at Austin, and residents of the Greater Austin area. Bastrop State Park lies east of downtown Bastrop on 100 Park Road 1A and is about 30 mi (48 km) east of Austin, the state capital. One of the major routes of El Camino Real de los Tejas National Historic Trail flows through the state park. Bastrop State Park is west of Buescher State Park, and the two are connected by Park Road 1; the road extends about 13 mi (21 km) and is suitable for cycling. The park has expanded in size over the years and currently has about 6,600 acres (2,700 hectares); its sister Buescher State Park has an additional 1,017 acres (412 hectares).

The park allows for overnight stay at a campsite or a historic cabin. The campsites range from walk-in tent sites to fully hookup RV sites; their amenities include picnic tables, outdoor grills, fire rings, water hookups, tent pads, and/or amp electric hookups. There are at least fifteen historic cabins with multiple floor plans. Their amenities include central A/C and heating, private restrooms equipped with toilets and showers, indoor fireplaces, and electronics such as microwaves, stoves, refrigerators, in addition to other outdoor amenities available in campsites.

Bastrop State Park has a swimming pool that is open seasonally. Guests can use the lap swim or open swim pools, and both of them are available for reservation in specific slots throughout the morning and afternoons. The daily fees vary depending on the age and/or membership access. The pool is equipped with a diver tower, diving boards, and wading pools on both ends. There is a bathhouse at one of the ends of the pool and lockers for pool guests. The pool's construction started in December 1935 and was estimated to cost US$35,000 (about $728,214 in 2022). It was constructed along with a water filtering plant that cleaned the pool's water every eight to ten hours. During the 1940s, the pool was one of the few, oval-shaped pools in Texas.

=== Golf course ===
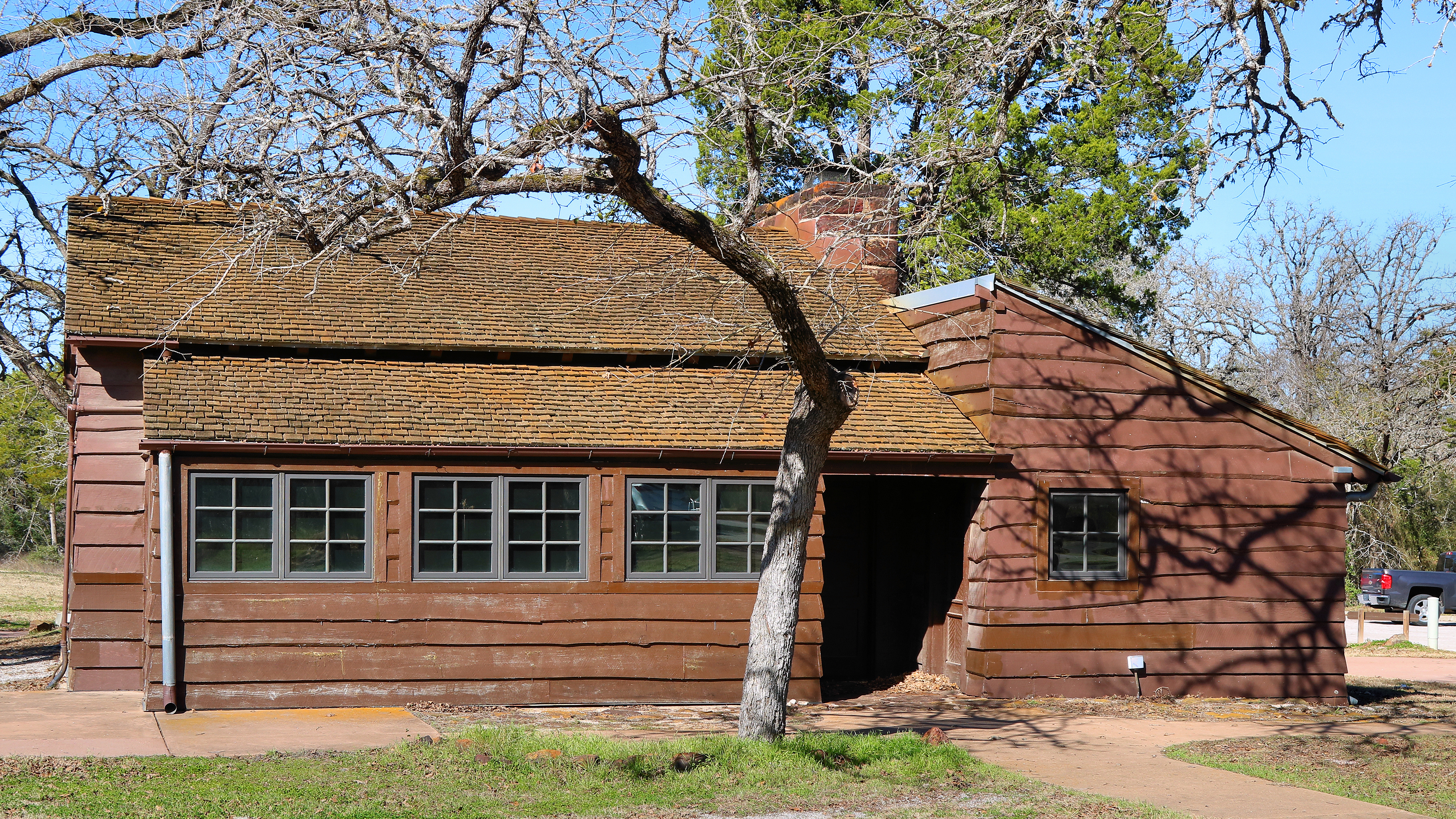
The former golf shelter was a gathering point for generations of golfer that played the course in the park.

Bastrop State Park was one of the few state parks in the Texas to have a golf course, and the only one to have up to 18 holes. In the 1930s, the CCC designed and built the golf course along with the WPA and the Bastrop Golf Club. Named the Lost Pines Golf Course, it was originally built as a nine-hole course. The golf course hosted golfers as early as 1936 and was part of the CCC's intended park design. It was expanded to an 18-hole course in 1995. The golf course occupied 137 acres (55 ha) of the park and operated successfully for over 70 years. However, after the 2011 wildfires, golfer attendance greatly reduced and revenues decreased by at least thirty-five percent. The course's main water pump broke in October 2014, delaying the seedings of the course's greens and decreasing revenue even more.

In January 2015, Bastrop State Park closed the golf course due to financial struggles but expressed plans to repurpose the land for recreation. Park authorities said they wanted to construct an amphitheater, a nature center, and several hike and bike trails over the golf course. These facilities would include an education center on the ecology of the Lost Pines and the endangered Houston toad, new picnic sites, natural playscapes, and a restored lake. The backbone of this project was a proposed trail system that included a 3 mi (4.8 km) hike-and-bike trail, a 1.5 mi (2.4 km) educational trail, a 0.25 mi (400 m) hike-only trail, and a 1 mi (1.6 km) long sidewalk connecting Bastrop State Park's entrance with the city of Bastrop through Chesnut Street.

The golf course's closure was not favorably received by some Bastrop residents, who said that the course was an amenity that attracted visitors and added to the park's beauty. For decades, the golf course operated as a leased concession; the TPWD tried twice to search for new operators but were unsuccessful in closing a contract and were forced to close the golf course. Two years prior, the golf course's maintenance worsen as it began to get overgrown by weeds and grass. Required repairs to the golf course's irrigation system and the high costs to protect the endangered Houston toad hindered the course's viability. Other factors like droughts, wildfires, and flood damaged also worsened the park's condition and furthered the park's decision to close the golf course permanently.

According to a survey from the TPWD, fifty-seven percent of respondents in 2015 said that they favored the park's project to close the golf course and implement the new additions. Additionally, a vast majority of Bastrop residents, roughly around ninety percent, said in a parks study that year that they were interested in more trails and outdoor programs. These responses were factors in the TPWD's decision to move forward with closing the golf course and pushing for a "tribute green" program to educate future generations on the role that Lost Pines Golf Course played in Bastrop State Park's history. "We have to look past the golf course at this time," principal planner Matt Fougerat said in 2015. "We can’t go back."

TPWD estimated that this project would cost between US$4.2 and US$5 million to complete. Bastrop State Park funds were not enough to cover the estimations, and park authorities said that the money would have to be approved and funded by the Texas Legislature, which approves fundings for parks every two years. The money, however, is not guaranteed, and park planners said that it could be close to a decade before the funding is approved for this project in Bastrop State Park. In 2014, state officials cut TPWD funding by US$36 million. Considering that the TPWD had a backlog of US$800 million in repairs when Bastrop State Park submitted the proposal, this considerably delayed the golf course renovation.

=== Trails ===
There are up to 16.1 mi (25.9 km) of trails at Bastrop State Park; all are open to hiking and some are open for cycling. The trails vary in difficulty because some of the trails on the northern part of the park are not accessible friendly and are considered challenging for hikers of all experience levels due to its slopes and curves. Visitors are allowed to bring pets on trails but are required to be on a leash to their safety and to protect wildlife. The park also hosts an annual competition called the Wildflower Trail Run, with distances ranging from 5 km (3.1 mi) all the way up to a 50 km (31 mi) ultramarathon. Below are the trails displayed on the official Bastrop State Park trails map:

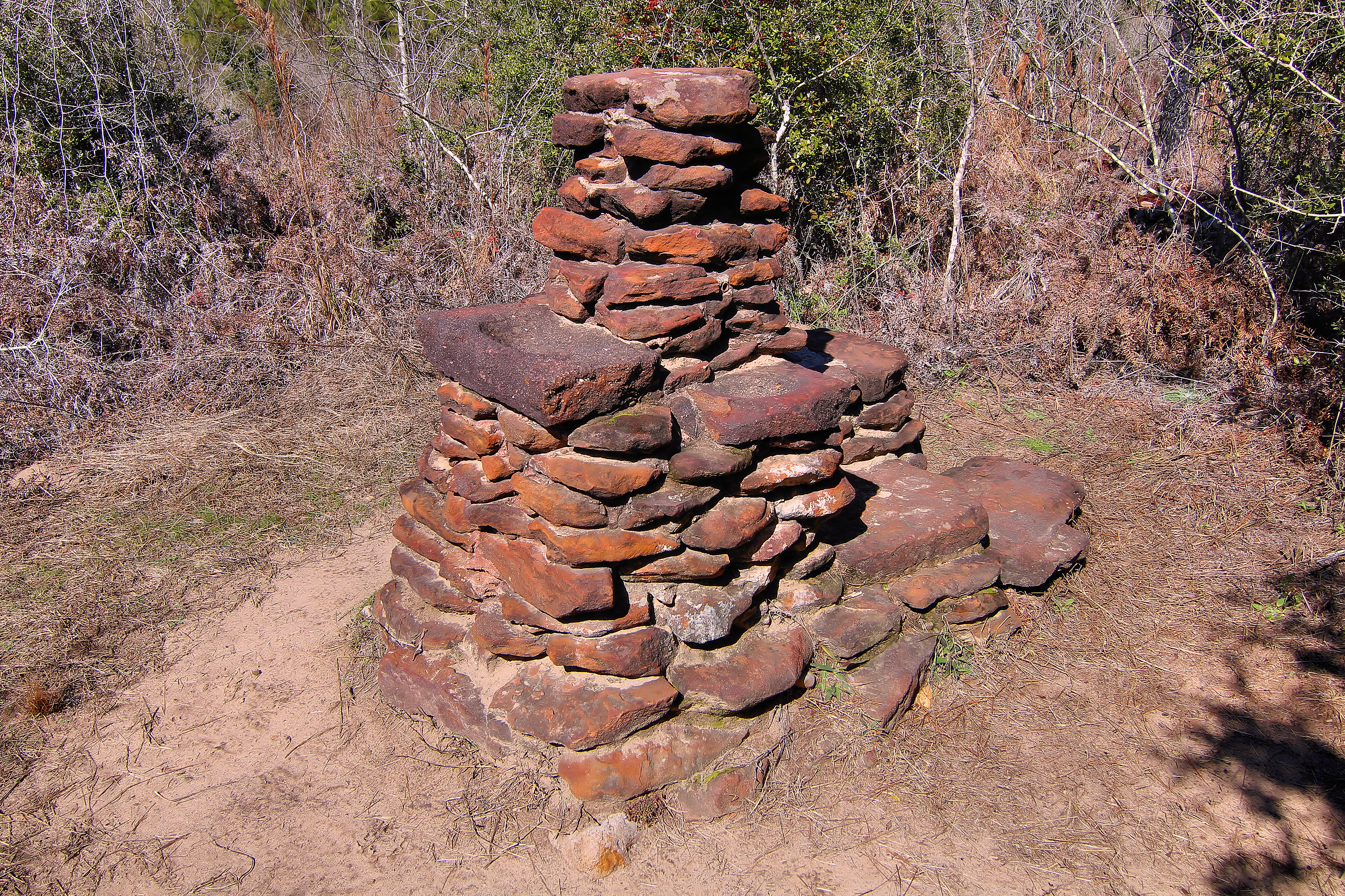
The former stone water fountain built by the CCC on Piney Hill Spur.

- Piney Hill Spur is a 0.25 mi (400 m) trail that connects a campground to a former stone water fountain built by the CCC, one of the park's nine points of interest (POI). Halfway through the trail are exposed Carrizo sandstone, a natural material from the area that was used by the CCC to create several park structures. There is a 60 ft (18 m) change in elevation and an 8.1% grade. The trail is described as moderate in difficulty, and hikers on average take 5 minutes to complete it.
- Pine Warbler Trail is a 0.29 mi (470 m) trail close to a playground that connects to two other trails, Post Oak Spur and Scenic Overlook. It passes over Copperas Creek, where park authorities recommend hikers to observe animal tracks on the sand. The trail is named after a pine warbler, a bird seen in Bastrop State Park throughout the entire year. There is a 85 ft (26 m) change in elevation and a 7.5% grade. The trail is described as moderate in difficulty, and hikers on average take 10 minutes to complete it.
- Post Oak Spur is a 0.46 mi (740 m) trail that starts at the intersection point of Scenic Overlook Pine Warbler trails, near the stone water foundation POI, and leads to a parking lot on Park Road 1A. The trail was named after a quercus stellata (post oak), a tree commonly seen throughout the park that increases in abundance further east. There is a 70 ft (21 m) change in elevation and a 5.7% grade. The trail is described as moderate in difficulty, and hikers on average take 15 minutes to complete it.
- Farkleberry Spur is a 0.36 mi (580 m) trail that connects a campground and parking lot area to a POI that serves as a controlled burn area. This POI connects to Scenic Overlook trail through a bridge that crosses Copperas Creek. The trail is named after a vaccinium arboreum (farkleberry), a widespread, native berry that is a source of food for squirrels, rabbits, and birds, at the park. Park authorities recommend hikers to observe birds in this trail, especially those active in the mornings. There is a 95 ft (29 m) change in elevation and an 8% grade. The trail is described as moderate in difficulty, and hikers on average take 10 minutes to complete it.
- Lake Spur Trail is a 0.21 mi (340 m) trail that connects Scenic Overlook Trail to Bastrop State Park Lake. It is intended to connect several campgrounds from other trails and lead hikers to the lake. There is a 15 ft (4.6 m) change in elevation and a 1.6% grade. The trail is described as moderate in difficulty, and hikers on average take 10 minutes to complete it.

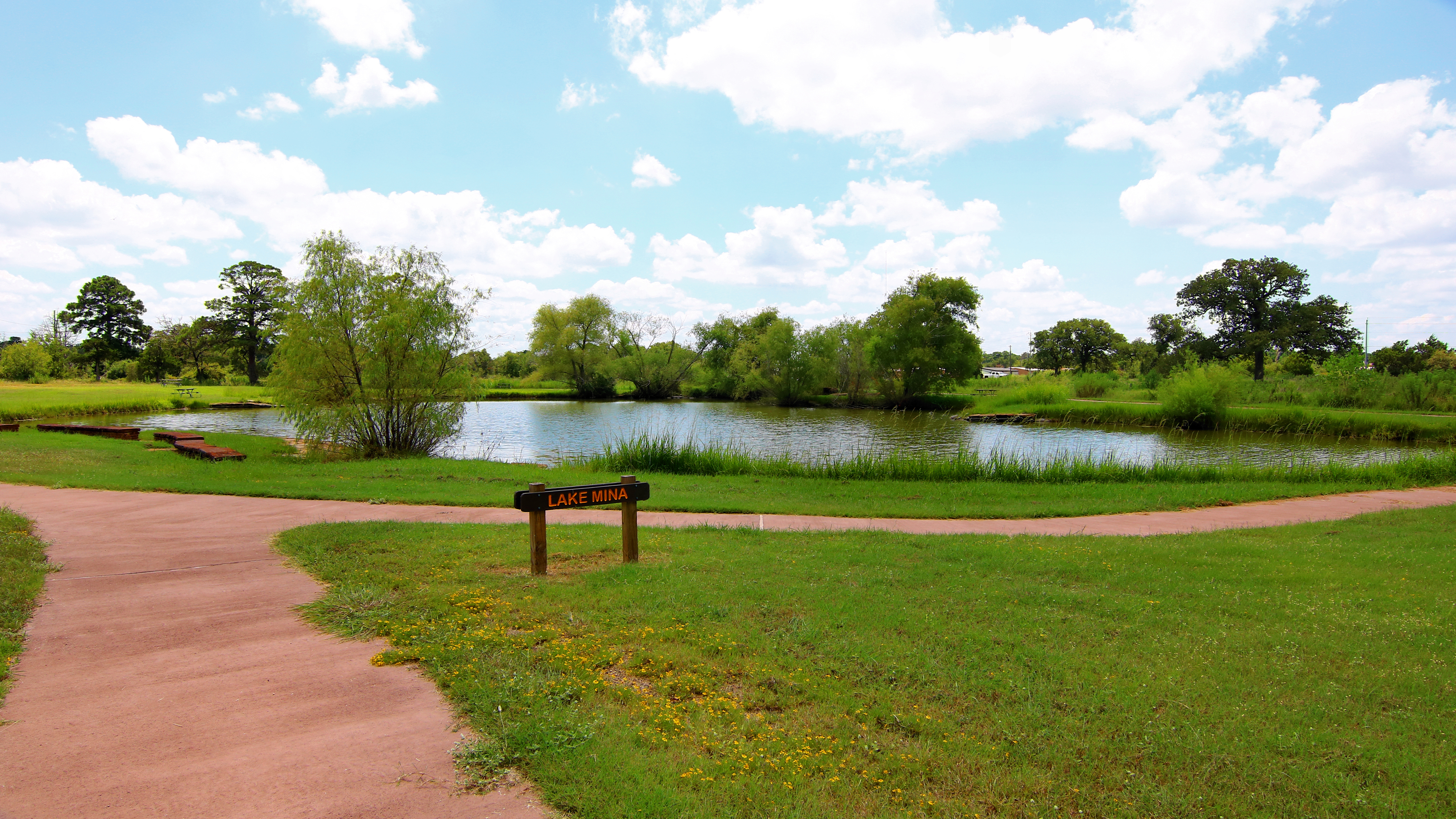
Lake Mina is off one of the Tree Army Trails and is open for fishing.

- Tree Army Trails is a 4.5 mi (7.2 km) web of bike and hike mini trails found near the park's main entrance. The trails surround the park's headquarters and Lake Mina, and end near a former golf course. The trail is named after Roosevelt's Tree Army, a nickname of the CCC. This trail is surrounded by loblolly pines and is intended to showcase the park's scenic views. The northern parts of the trail may be challenging for all trail users due to its slopes and curves. The southern part of this trail leads to Lake Mina, and are accessible with wheelchairs and strollers.
- Scenic Overlook Trail is a 1.7 mi (2.7 km) trail that leads to a high point where there is a former CCC water tower and picnic area, another of the park's POIs. This trail connects with all other trails expect with Tree Army Trails, and serves to showcase scenic views of Lost Pines landscape. There is a 140 ft (43 m) change in elevation and an 6.1% grade. The trail is described as moderate in difficulty, and hikers on average take 40 minutes to complete it.
- Lost Pines Loop is an 8.2 mi (13.2 km) trail that circles most of the park. It is the longest and most challenging trail, and has a diverse landscape of steep hills and gradual descents. Park authorities recommend using a road called Harmon Road and a power line as landmarks if hikers wish to return to their starting point. There is a 165 ft (50 m) change in elevation and an 8% grade. The trail is described as challenging in difficulty, and hikers on average take 5 hours to complete it.

== Nature ==
Bastrop State Park is located on Mount Selman geological formation, making a lot of its soil have a dark red and yellow composition.

=== Plants ===
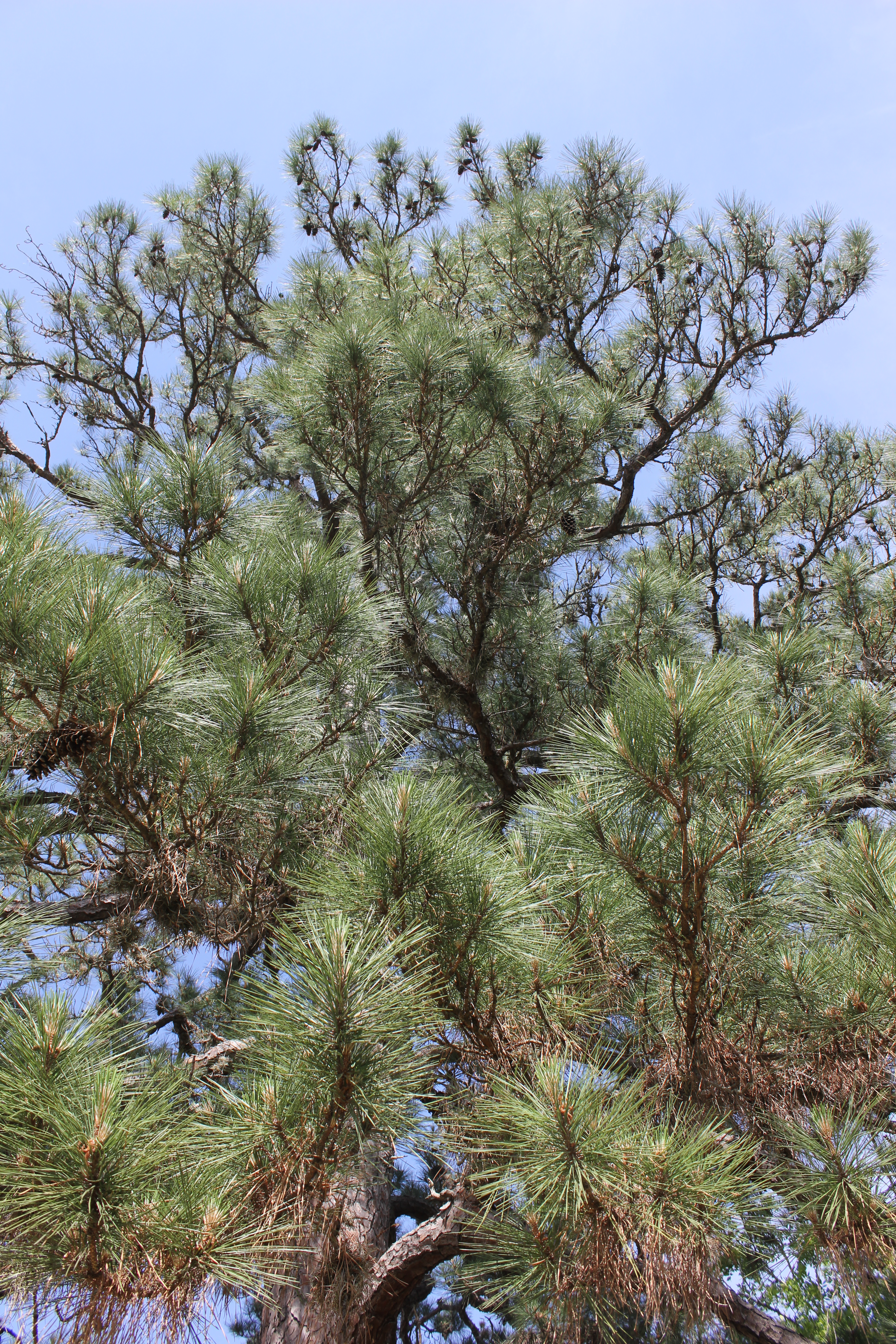
Loblolly pines are prevalent throughout the park.

Bastrop State Park hosts a wide variety of plants and animals not commonly seen in other areas of Central Texas. The park is in the heart of the Lost Pines, an ecological area of over 75,000 acres (30,000 ha) of loblolly pines. This pine woodland is isolated from the main body of East Texas Piney Wood ecoregion by about 100 miles (160 km), hence its name. Portions of the Lost Pines are located in Bastrop and Buescher State Parks. In addition, the park is part of the Post Oak Savannah, an ecological region of 8,500,000 acres (3,400,000 ha) of hilly lands that includes scattered oaks, mainly post oaks and blackjack oak. Most of this ecoregion is somewhat arid due to its clay soil, but the area in Bastrop is an exception. The Carrizo sand found in Bastrop provides fertile harbor for loblolly pine, post oak, and blackjack oak.

In 1937, Bastrop State Park officials worked with UT Austin to help them classify about 500 plant specimens. A collection was made to also study the various types of insects at the park and include them in the park's herbarium. Park officials said they started this initiative so that they would have all plants classified.

=== Animals ===
Mammals recorded in the park are white-tailed deer, eastern cottontail, eastern fox squirrel, Virginia opossum, striped skunk and Mexican long-nosed armadillo. There are over 280 insect, millipede, centipede, spider, scorpion, mollusk, and worm species recorded in Bastrop State Park and the surrounding Lost Pines region. Some of the species found in Bastrop State Park were first discovered there by biologists. Four venomous snake species have been observed; the timber rattlesnake, northern cottonmouth, broad-banded copperhead and Texas coral snake.

More than 200 species of birds have been spotted in Bastrop State Park. Among the most common is the pileated woodpecker, the largest of all woodpecker species. The pine warbler, barred owl, yellow-throated vireo, northern parula, black-and-white warbler, Northern cardinal and red-shouldered hawk live in the park year-around. In the winter season, other bird species can be found as well, including the red-breasted nuthatch, solitary vireo, golden-crowned kinglet, purple finch, and the hermit thrush.

The seasonally moist sandy soil in Bastrop State Park and the entire Lost Pines provide a critical habitat for the endangered Houston toad. The Houston toad was designated as an endangered species in 1970. Loss of habitat, mostly due to urbanization, has caused a large decline in its population. Bastrop State Park is home to the largest mating group of Houston toads on public land. Areas of the park are closed to the public during the toad's mating season in February, March, and April.

=== Fungi ===
In the forested areas, numerous species of fungi may be found, such as Pycnoporus cinnabarinus.

== Wildfires ==
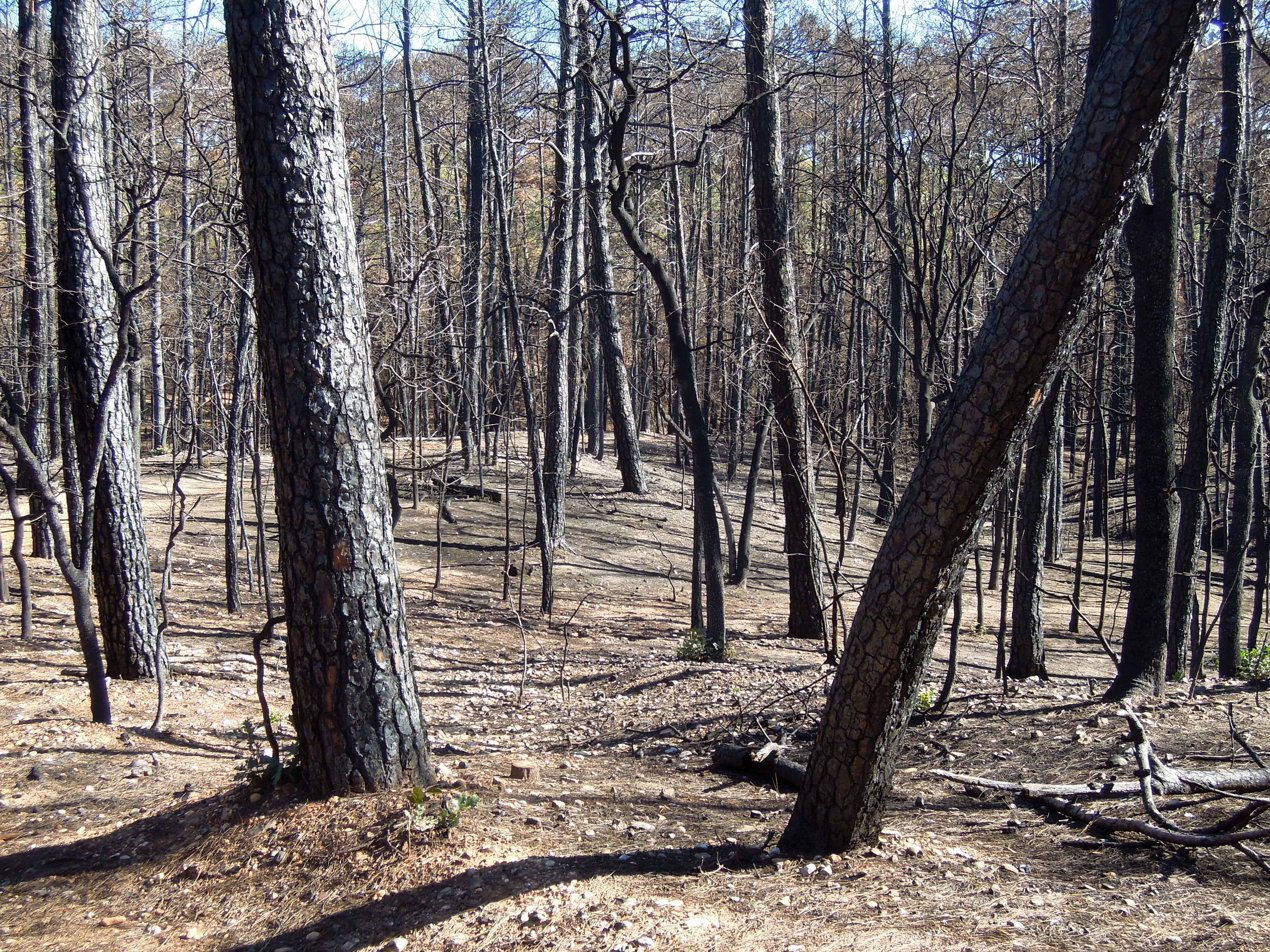
The forest of the park shortly after the Bastrop County Complex Fire in 2011. 96% of the park was burned.

Several fires of varying intensities have occurred at Bastrop State Park and its surrounding areas since it was opened.

In August 1940, a fire was recorded in Bastrop State Park. It destroyed the CCC's original furniture shop and a mill. A local newspaper claimed that this shop was where all the furniture from Texas state parks was made. No injures or deaths were reported, and the losses were estimated to be around US$40,000 (about US$848,022 in 2022). The fire was discovered by park rangers on an evening check, and it gained much headway as hours progressed. Volunteers from the Bastrop and Smithville Fire Department helped put out the fire. In March 1942, a low-intensity fire was recorded at the park. Firefighters took three days to put out the fire, but they reported that there was no serious damage to the forest.

On 17 November 1950, a grassland fire at Bastrop State Park and a neighboring private property lasted for about a week and was contained by November 26. A park employee explained that fire fighters were not able to contain the fire for days because new fires were reported as the old ones were put out. Most of the damage took place on the park's eastern part where vegetation and fence posts were destroyed. However, most of the east side's timber was not seriously damaged. Officials said that the fire was likely caused by cigarettes left by hunters who were at Bastrop State Park for the deer hunting season, which had opened for the first time in several years.

In early 1954, a fire was reported on the eastern edge of Bastrop State Park, damaging about 2,000 acres (810 ha) of forest. Later that year on 19 July 1954, another fire broke out at a pasture-searing furnace near the same location. Approximately thirty landowners, volunteers, and park employees helped in firefighting efforts. One of them used a bulldozer to cut through the fire line to prevent it from spreading to other areas. However, the record-high temperatures of the summer and shifting wind currents prolonged the fire for over a week, causing the flames to spread out of control. (Note: The summer temperatures in Bastrop in 1954 were the highest recorded in July since 1923. During one of the days when the fire was recorded, the temperature was 109 °F (43 °C) in Bastrop. The drought also was a factor in the fires.) The fire was first reported near a 500 feet (150 m) right-of-way passage that connects Bastrop State Park with Buescher State Park. Up to 6,000 acres (2,400 ha) of forest were burned; this included several private properties owned by Bastrop residents and businesses. The fire was reported as "generally under control" by 27 January after a sudden rainstorm while fire fighters remained in high alert for more flares. The City of Bastrop described the fire as "the biggest in memory, the worst [they'd] seen."

On 30 October 1955, another fire was reported in Bastrop State Park. Officials confirmed that up to 900 acres (360 ha) of the forest were likely engulfed by fire. An additional 200 acres (81 ha) were burned outside of the park's boundaries. One park employee said that the fire was more "helpful than hurtful" because it ended up inadvertently burning a bushy area without damaging park structures, but other park officials disagreed on the extent of the damage. The cabins and other buildings at the park were protected by encircling strips of newly plowed soil, which stopped the fire from spreading. Several trees were damaged, but no private homes were caught by fire and no casualties were reported. The fire was first reported on a Sunday morning before it spread through the park's northern part close to a heavily timbered area. Park manager G. M. Marbury said that he fought the fire with the aide of two more park employees the first evening, but others assisted the following Monday morning. Marbury said that they thought they had the fire under control before dawn, but the early morning winds continued to prolong the fire. Because of the sandy terrain, moving fire fighting equipment to the location was difficult. Marbury complained about the lack of volunteer support from Bastrop citizens. When asked about the cause of the fire, he said it was undetermined, but speculated that it may have originated from outside the park. He made a reference to the controlled fires that farmers in nearby areas start when clearing their lands.

On 5 April 1958, a fire was recorded at Bastrop State Park and threatened 12 cabins occupied by 15 people. The fire, fanned by northwest winds, spread through two cabin areas. The fire was first reported late in the morning and by nightfall had burned more than 800 acres (320 ha) of heavy pine woods. Road machinery was used to cut lanes in the brush to halt the spread of flames. About 100 volunteers assisted in the firefight. A minor league baseball team from Topeka, Kansas, was at the park for their spring training and volunteered to help, but park officials confirmed they were not needed. The Texas Department of Public Safety, Bastrop fire fighters, and highway patrol units joined the firefighting efforts that evening. In addition, bulldozers and heavy road equipment from the Bergstrom Air Force Base in Austin were sent to help fight the fire. No casualties or injuries were reported; park visitors were given ample time to evacuate before the fires reached their cabin areas. The fire was reportedly caused by a park visitor who went out to the woods to make a camp fire. After making the fire, the man put dirt on it, covered it in rocks, and thought it was out. However, some of the fire was not extinguished and spread quickly with the pine needles and the 25 km (16 mi) winds. The fire nearly died down twenty-four hours later, but rekindled after a north brisk was reported the next morning. According to Marbury, about 1,400 acres (570 ha) were partially effected by the fire.

In September 2011, 96% of the park was burned by the Bastrop County Complex fire. Only around 100 acres were saved. Most CCC structures were saved, but were still threatened. The park was closed on September 4 due to the fire and did not reopen until December 2. In 2012, a campaign was begun to restore the forest within 30 years by replacing 4 million burned trees.

In March 2026, a wildfire burned 46 acres of the park.

== See also ==
- List of Texas state parks
- National Register of Historic Places listings in Bastrop County, Texas

== Bibliography ==
- Kutac, Edward A.; Caran, S. Christopher (2014). Birds and Other Wildlife of South Central Texas: A Handbook. University of Texas Press. ISBN 978-0292786387.
- Newlan, Ralph Edward; Steely, James W.; Begley, Susan; Carr, Ethan (1997). National Historic Landmark Nomination: Bastrop State Park. Washington, DC: National Park Service.
- Parent, Laurence (2019). Hiking Texas: A Guide to the State's Greatest Hiking Adventures (3rd ed.). Rowman & Littlefield. ISBN 978-1493037315.
- Taber, Stephen Welton; Fleenor, Scott B. (2003). Insects of the Texas Lost Pines. W. L. Moody Jr. Natural History Series. Vol. 33. Texas A&M University Press. ISBN 1585442364.
- Steely, James Wright (2010). The Civilian Conservation Corps in Texas State Parks (PDF). Texas Parks and Wildlife Department.
- Miller, George Oxford (2009). Lone Star Travel Guide to Texas Parks and Campgrounds (5th ed.). Taylor Trade Publications. ISBN 978-1589794412.
- Zelade, Richard (2011). Lone Star Travel Guide to Central Texas. Taylor Trade Publications. ISBN 978-1589796089.
