= Rattlesnake pilot =

Rattlesnake pilot may refer to:

- Agkistrodon contortrix laticinctus, also known as the broad-banded copperhead, a venomous viper species found in the United States.
- Lampropeltis getula getula, also known as the eastern kingsnake, a harmless colubrid found in the eastern United States.
