= Westgate Tower =

Historic structure in Austin, Texas

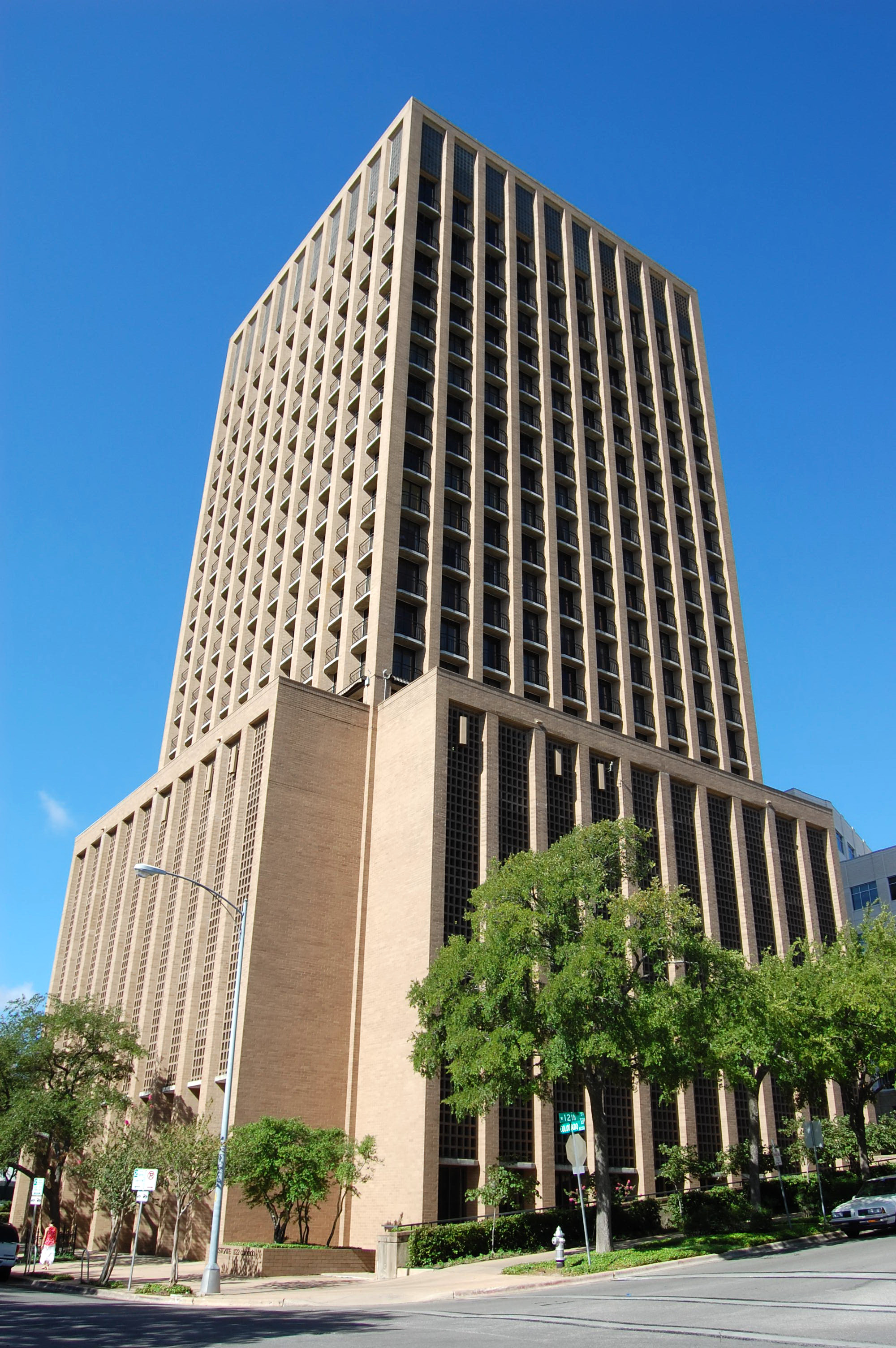
- Viewed from the northeast
- Interactive map of the Westgate Tower area

General information
- Architectural style: Mid-century modern
- Location: 1122 Colorado St., Austin, Texas 78701, United States
- Coordinates: 30°16′27″N 97°44′34″W
- Construction started: October 1964
- Completed: 1966

Height
- Height: 261 feet (80 m)

Technical details
- Material: Reinforced concrete, brick
- Floor count: 26
- Floor area: 270,000 square feet (25,000 m^{2})

Design and construction
- Architects: Edward Durell Stone; Arthur Fehr and Charles Granger
- Developer: Lumbermen's Investment Corporation
- Structural engineer: W. Clark Craig
- Services engineer: B. Segall, Jr.

Other information
- Number of units: 93 condominiums
- Parking: 231 spaces
- Westgate Tower
- U.S. National Register of Historic Places
- Recorded Texas Historic Landmark
- Location within Texas Location within the United States
- Area: less than one acre
- NRHP reference No.: 10000820
- RTHL No.: 17182

Significant dates
- Added to NRHP: October 12, 2010
- Designated RTHL: 2012

The Westgate Tower is a mixed-use high-rise building in downtown Austin, Texas. The twenty-six-story 261-foot (80 m) tower block was designed in 1962 and completed in 1966; its name reflects its location across the street from the west gate of the Texas State Capitol. Designed by architect Edward Durell Stone, the tower was added to the National Register of Historic Places in 2010 and designated a Recorded Texas Historic Landmark in 2012.

== History ==
After World War II, the neighborhood to the west of the Texas State Capitol began to be redeveloped, with four- and five-story low-rise office buildings replacing houses to make space for state agencies and businesses connected with the capitol. In 1962, the Lumbermen's Investment Corporation of Austin began planning to build a new residential high-rise building on a lot overlooking the capitol grounds from the west.

In July 1962, Lumbermen's hired New York architect Edward Durell Stone to design the exterior of the planned tower; Stone's office collaborated with Austin architects Arthur Fehr and Charles Granger, who designed the tower's interior spaces and details. The building was publicly announced in the Austin Statesman on November 10, 1962 as the "Westgate Tower" (named for its proximity to the west gate of the capitol grounds). The developer purchased the lot on June 10, 1963; final plans for the Westgate Tower were submitted to the City of Austin in July 1964, and excavation for the tower's foundation began that October. The tower was completed and opened to occupants in 1966.

Its residential floors were originally leased out as apartments, until the residences were converted to condominiums in 1984. On October 12, 2010, the tower was added to the National Register of Historic Places in recognition of its architectural significance and its historical importance as the first mixed-use high-rise building in Austin, and the first of many high-rise buildings in the downtown and capitol area. It was also designated a Recorded Texas Historic Landmark in 2012. The tower was nominated as an Austin Historic Landmark in 2012, but the applicants withdrew the nomination after public criticism of the associated property tax abatements.

=== Capitol view controversy ===
In 1931, the City of Austin had enacted a local ordinance limiting the height of new buildings to a maximum of 200 feet (61 m), aiming to preserve the visual preeminence of the Texas Capitol; since that time, only the University of Texas Main Building Tower had been built higher than the limit, using an exception allowing for additional height with a greater setback. The proposed design for the Westgate Tower significantly exceeded the height limit (though it compensated with a setback for the portion above the parking garage).

The prospect of so tall a structure so close to the capitol attracted significant opposition as plans proceeded. In January 1963, Texas Governor Price Daniel voiced his opposition to the proposed tower in his final address to the Texas Legislature. Resistance continued as construction progressed, with State Representative Henry Grover of Houston introducing a bill to condemn the property in February 1965, which was defeated in March in the Texas House of Representatives by only two votes.

The controversy over the preservation of the capitol's visual presence that dogged the Westgate Tower's construction continued to grow after its completion. The Westgate was followed by even taller structures: first the Dobie Center (designed in 1968), and then a series of ever larger downtown bank towers, culminating in the 395-foot (120 m) One American Center (designed in 1982). In 1983, inspired by the Westgate and these other structures, the State of Texas created a list of protected Capitol View Corridors along which structures may not be built, so as to protect the capitol's visibility from various points in Austin.

=== Tenants ===
Because of its proximity to the capitol, the Westgate Tower's residential tenants have included lobbyists, state officials (such as David Dewhurst), and state legislators (including A. R. Schwartz, one of the proponents of the unsuccessful 1965 legislation which would have prevented the tower from being completed). Its twenty-fourth floor was occupied by the Headliners' Club, a social club for leading Texas politicians and academics, from the tower's opening in 1966 through 1975.

== Architecture ==
The Westgate Tower is a twenty-six-story tower block built of poured-in-place reinforced concrete with a brick veneer. Designed in 1962, its architecture exemplifies the mid-century modern style with its symmetrical geometric structure and abundant windows. The exterior was designed by New York-based architect Edward Durell Stone, a noted proponent of New Formalism, while the interior and details were designed by the Austin partnership of Arthur Fehr and Charles Granger. W. Clark Craig worked with Fehr and Granger as the tower's structural engineer, and B. Segall, Jr., served as the mechanical and electrical engineer.

The basement first floor holds office space, while the second and third floors (at street level on the east and west elevations, respectively, due to the sloping lot) hold a blend of office and commercial space. The fourth through ninth floors house the building's parking garage, above which residential space fills levels ten through twenty-two. Additional office space occupies levels twenty-three and twenty-four, and the twenty-fifth floor holds mechanical rooms and a two-story sunroom. Finally, the twenty-sixth floor holds a rooftop swimming pool area.

=== Exterior ===
The parking garage and lower levels have a cross-shaped plan, from which the upper levels are set back to form a narrower, square cross section. The faces of the building are dominated by parallel vertical columns with brown Butler brick veneers, with ten bays of windows penetrating the structure between the columns. On the parking garage levels and the top two stories, the bays are enclosed by open brick screens; on the residential and upper office levels, they feature full-height sliding glass doors and balconies with iron railings.

At ground level, the east elevation of the tower features two-story windows covering the entire east facade of levels two and three. A pedestrian entrance through glass doors on the second floor leads to a lobby and elevators for the residential levels. There are no entrances in the north or south sides of the tower, but the west face has two vehicle entry and exit bays at street level on the third floor; the left bay leads to the delivery landing on the basement first floor, while the right leads to the parking garage. Tenants and customers for the building's commercial and office spaces enter through the third-story west-side entrances.

== See also ==
- List of Recorded Texas Historic Landmarks in Travis County
- List of tallest buildings in Austin, Texas
- National Register of Historic Places listings in Travis County, Texas
