= Thunder snake =

Thunder snake may refer to:

- Agkistrodon contortrix laticinctus, a.k.a. the broad-banded copperhead, a venomous pitviper subspecies found in the United States
- Agkistrodon contortrix mokasen, a.k.a. the northern copperhead, a venomous pitviper species found in the United States.
- Lampropeltis g. getula, a.k.a. the eastern kingsnake, a harmless colubrid subspecies found in the eastern United States
