= Buescher State Park =

State park in Texas, United States

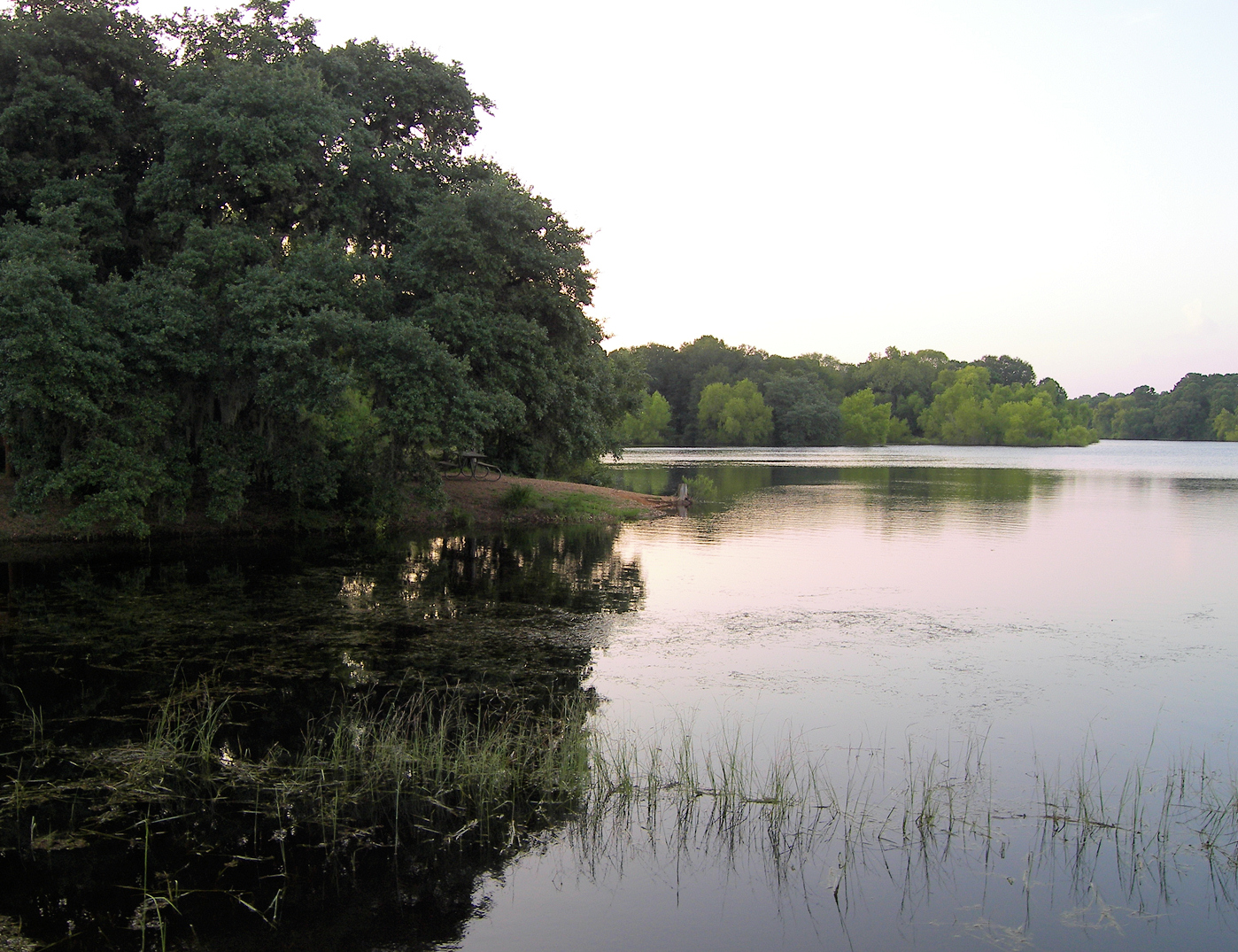
- Park Lake in Buescher State Park is a favorite with anglers.

- Location within Texas Location within the United States
- Location: Bastrop County, Texas
- Nearest city: Smithville, Texas
- Coordinates: 30.0387°N 97.1583°W
- Area: 1,016.7 acres (411 ha)
- Established: 1940
- Named for: Emil and Elizabeth Buescher
- Visitors: 53,588 (in 2025)
- Governing body: Texas Parks and Wildlife Department
- Website: Official site

Buescher State Park is a state park located just north of Smithville in Bastrop County, Texas, United States. The park consists of 1,016.7 acres (411 ha) of public land donated to the state by Mr. Emil and Mrs. Elizabeth Buescher, as well as the City of Smithville. The park opened in 1940 and is managed by the Texas Parks and Wildlife Department (TPWD).

== History ==
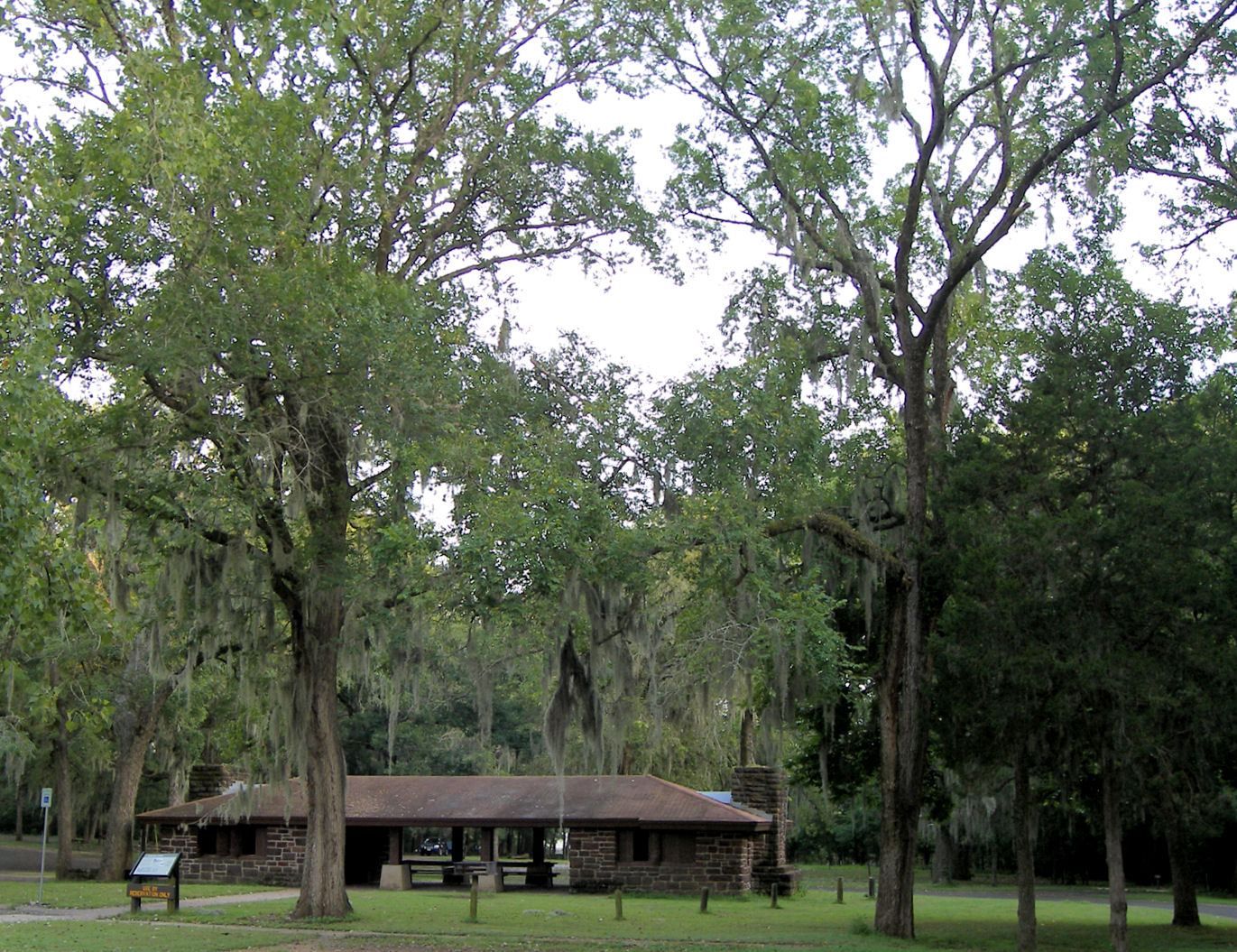
A group shelter built by the Civilian Conservation Corps at the Lakeview Camping Area at Buescher State Park.

Between the years 1933 and 1936, Mr. Emil and Mrs. Elizabeth Buescher deeded 318 acres (129 ha) of land to the State of Texas. After Emil Buescher's death, his heirs donated 318 acres (1.29 km^{2}) more. The rest of the parkland was acquired from the city of Smithville.

Companies 1805 and 1811 of the Civilian Conservation Corps built many of the park facilities between 1933 and 1939 using native stone to better blend with the surrounding landscape.

When it opened in 1940, the park was 1,738 acres (703 ha). In 1967, the Texas Legislature transferred 700 acres (280 ha) to The University of Texas M. D. Anderson Cancer Center for use as a research facility, currently known as the Virginia Harris Cockrell Cancer Research Center at The University of Texas MD Anderson Cancer Center (Science Park).

In May 1957, Buescher State Park was selected to test a new type of low-cost overnight housing for park visitors.

== Geology ==
The main bedrock beneath Buescher State Park is Carrizo Sand, which is a sandstone deposited by ancient rivers and streams flowing across the Gulf Coastal Plain. It was formed during the Eocene epoch roughly 50 million years ago. The soils are related to weathering of the sandstone. There are also large quantities of chert and quartzite cobbles deposited by rivers during the late Pliocene and early Pleistocene (circa 5 to 1 million BP).

== Nature ==
The park is part of the Post Oak Savannah ecological region. A portion of its forest is in the Lost Pines ecosystem, the westernmost loblolly pines in the United States. The Hidden Pines fire in 2015 burned about two-thirds of the park including most of the pines in this forest.

=== Animals ===
Over 250 species of birds have been spotted in the park throughout the year including the largest woodpecker species, the pileated woodpecker. Mammals include white-tailed deer, common raccoon, Virginia opossum, bobcat, and Mexican long-nosed armadillo. Buescher is part of the habitat for the endangered Houston toad. Venomous animals observed the park include broad-banded copperhead and striped bark scorpion and more rarely timber rattlesnake and Texas coral snake.

=== Plants ===
Buescher is home to Big Tree, the former state champion cedar elm. Other tree species in the park include Mexican plum, post oak, blackjack oak, Texas live oak, sugar hackberry, flowering dogwood, eastern red cedar and yaupon holly. In areas of the park, many of the trees have abundant amounts of Spanish moss and ball moss on them. In the understory, Turk's cap, American beautyberry, little bluestem, prickly pear cactus and poison ivy are documented.

== Features ==
The park features a 7.7-mile (12.4 km) round trip hiking trail through the park's undeveloped area. There is a 25-acre (10 ha) lake open for canoeing, kayaking and fishing. Bluegill, redear sunfish, channel catfish and largemouth bass occupy the lake year-round, as well as rainbow trout during December and January when TPWD stocks them. No swimming is allowed in the lake. Camping and picnicking areas are available.

Buescher is less than four miles (6 km) to the east of Bastrop State Park and the two are connected by Park Road 1, a scenic route popular with motorists and cyclists.

== See also ==
- List of Texas state parks
