= Arthur Fehr =

American architect (1904–1969)

Arthur Fehr, F.A.I.A. (November 19, 1904 – January 23, 1969) was an American architect who turned in mid-career from his traditional architectural education to the Modern or International style and was one of its first practitioners in Texas.

== Early life ==
Arthur Herman Kilian Fehr was born to Herman Benno Fehr and Selma Ottilie Kilian Fehr in Austin, Texas. He was the second of three sons and reared in lower-middle class, ethnic surroundings. His father was a barber and barber supply salesman. Though both parents were native-born Americans the household language was German. The social focus was the extended family of their local Lutheran church.

== Education and early career ==
In his teens Fehr wanted to be a chemist. But a drafting teacher in his vocational school, noting his ability at sketching and cartooning, encouraged him to try architecture, and he enrolled in the University of Texas architecture program. After receiving his degree in 1925 he worked for architect Harvey P. Smith in San Antonio. Smith's work was in the Beaux Arts and Spanish Colonial styles, and under him Fehr worked on the first building of Lutheran Concordia College of Texas (now Concordia University). This was Kilian Hall, named for his own maternal great-grandfather, Jan Kilian, the pastoral leader of a group of Wendish immigrants to Texas in 1855. The building's design was later cited by the Architects' Guild of Texas, and for Fehr this was an early taste of peer recognition.

In 1926, on the urging of his university professors, Fehr left Texas for New York and worked as a draftsman for Kenneth M. Murchison, whose better known designs were in the Beaux Art tradition. He also took a short and pennywise tour of England and the Continent during the summer of 1927, from which he returned (in his own words) "[a] better American and a much better Texan". While in New York he attended night courses at the Beaux-Arts Institute of Design, Columbia University and New York University. He returned to San Antonio in 1928 to work as chief draftsman and designer for Smith on various projects ranging from the officers club at an Army air base to the restoration of San Antonio's 18th-century Spanish Governor's Palace. In 1931 the Depression interrupted his progress, but after two years of infrequent work he rejoined Smith in the survey and initial restoration work on San Antonio's 18th-century Spanish mission of San José y San Miguel de Aguayo.

This led to Fehr, at age 29, being offered the position of park architect-foreman for the National Park Service (NPS) at the beginning of 1934. He was assigned to the new Bastrop State Park project near Austin, part of the state's nascent parks system in the era of the Civilian Conservation Corps (CCC). From 1934 to 1937 he designed, supervised and participated in the construction of all the structures there as well as at the adjoining Buescher State Park near Smithville. These were in the proscribed "rustic" or "pioneer" style favored by the NPS at that time. He also designed and supervised the making of furniture and other decorative fittings used not only at Bastrop but throughout the Texas parks system. Other than some early student commissions Bastrop was the first work of Fehr's to be executed in his own right, and it was soon noted. In Park and Recreation Structures, originally published by the NPS in 1938, the author Good commented that the Bastrop guest cabins "add up to a total effect that is extraordinarily individual and attractive".

In the fall of 1936, towards the end of Fehr's tenure with the park service, came also his first published foray into "modernism": a modest picnic table with a space frame of copper and brass plumbing and a concrete slab top. In his 1938 NPS book Good noted that it was "novel rather than revolutionary" but also an example of "some recent experimentation [within the parks service]…loosed from the fetters of tradition to acknowledge the claims of new materials and methods".

In 1997, Bastrop State Park was designated a National Historic Landmark. Of the hundreds of CCC park projects under the New Deal, it is one of only five so cited to date.

== Return to Austin ==
By late 1937 Fehr had completed the bulk of the Bastrop work. Though offered a new position in the NPS as a furniture designer, he resigned in early August of that year and opened his own practice in Austin. This first office was in the back of the studio of the Swiss-born woodcarver Peter Mansbendel, whom Fehr had met in the 1920s through the Austin Saengerrunde, a German singing club.

Fehr's first commission was the First English Lutheran Church in Austin. The design was entirely in the Mission style with interior carvings by Mansbendel. But Fehr was pulling away from Mission and Rustic architecture towards modernism. In particular he admired Walter Gropius and the Bauhaus. The emphasis on craft, economy of construction, the use of readily available materials and strictly functional design echoed both the austerity of his upbringing and his experience in the early Depression as well as his recent work at Bastrop and his associations with Mansbendel, the ironworker Fortunat Weigl, the cabinetmaker Emil Schroeder and other local craftsmen. And at Bastrop in 1935 he had met a kindred spirit in 22-year-old Charles Granger, a fresh University of Texas architecture graduate who briefly worked as his assistant that summer. At the end of 1937 Granger returned from California, where he had been working for Richard Neutra, and hired on with Fehr's new practice in Austin.

Fehr's search for clients willing to attempt this unprecedented style of work and living resulted in a church and a few Austin houses such as those designed and built for the Dr. & Mrs. D. K. Brace (1938) and for Dr. & Mrs. Carl Fehr (Fehr's brother, built in 1940), as well as for Dr. & Mrs. Charles Darnall (1941).

Another result was the "St. Elmo-Tel", an exercise in the growing trend of "mo-tels", in this case fronting on the highway to San Antonio south of Austin. It appeared in the October 1941 issue of Architectural Record (AR), the first of Fehr's modern efforts to be published in a national magazine. The editors of AR cited it as "one of the most newsworthy" of architect-designed answers to "the serious need for this new type of accommodation". It featured large expanses of metal-framed glazing, pipe columns, exposed brickwork inside and out, and flat concrete slab roofs—a Bauhaus outpost on a Central Texas highway serving a uniquely modern American function. It was an early example of what would be the hallmark of Fehr's work, in partnership with Granger, after WWII: a distinctly spare and "industrial" look, admitting abundant light and ventilation, and treating economy of construction not as a limitation but as merely another design element. And it also featured one "regional" addition to this otherwise European-influenced design: a fireplace, exterior wall and chimney in rough-cut limestone, the "rustic vernacular" employed by so-called rock-layers in the Austin area since the city's beginnings a hundred years before.

In 1938, Fehr married Mary Jane Grant of San Antonio, whose father Albert W. Grant was managing editor of the San Antonio Express.

With the start of WWII Fehr closed his office. Too old to enlist (he had just turned 37), he served with the Army Service Forces, traveling around the Southwest inspecting military structures and in some cases filling in as an ad hoc interpreter for German prisoners-of-war at various prison camps.

== Post-War practice ==
Back in Austin in late 1945, Fehr and Granger established a partnership in that name (often shortened to simply "F&G") committed to "the practice of progressive architecture". Success soon followed. Residences and a church were published in Architectural Record in 1946 and 1947. By the Spring of the following year they had received their first national award—one of eight Mentions out of one hundred entries—in the second annual awards competition of the modernist periodical Progressive Architecture (P/A) in whose pages they would appear regularly from that time on (see "Partial List of Published Work" below). Although they designed residences, clinics, and various other commercial and institutional projects, educational and church structures later were the core of their best-known work.

F&G made the Texas climate, where "air-conditioning" was yet to be practical or affordable (especially in school construction) a central consideration. They spread their school buildings out into multiple wings with large aluminum awning windows for light and ventilation . And they used such "cool" structural elements as pre-stressed concrete beams and interior walls of glazed structural clay tile—novel and inexpensive applications at the time, especially in Texas. The name of the school, stated in Neutra's iconic aluminum letters floating on a plain brick wall, was typically the only architectural decoration.

This economy of expression and cost extended to their other work. And F&G shared with many other early American modernists—architects and industrial designers alike—the ideal of developing a design ethic peculiar to their region, thus producing something American and not merely imitative of Europeans.

For Fehr that meant local limestone rockwork inside and out. Floor coverings, walls and exterior sunscreens were fashioned from structural tile fired from the deep red clay of D'Hanis in South Texas. Casement and awning windows were of aluminum. Exterior wall surfaces and even sun shades were often simply gray asbestos-cement panels, either flat or corrugated and impervious to the rigorous Texas climate. The results tended to be too ascetic for some tastes. Fehr's own residence, built in 1949, was featured six years later in a House Beautiful article introduced as "How to Learn from a house you may not Like" (with photographs by Ezra Stoller).

F&G was a collaborative design practice, and both partners worked with their junior associates on their firm's designs. Indeed, their own early houses (Granger's was completed in 1952) offer little to distinguish one hand from the other's beyond Granger's preference for brick over Fehr's rough limestone. But Fehr had been raised in a deep Lutheran tradition, and he took primary interest in F&G's church designs. Among the better known of his work today are two campuses for the Episcopal Diocese of Texas: St. Stephen's Episcopal School in the hills to the west of Austin (1953) and the Episcopal Theological Seminary of the Southwest (1954) in the city itself. The chapel on each campus is a particularly Fehr design. The first is essentially a stripped-down Mission form, drawn from his pre-modern beginnings. The latter is less formal and more intimate, with floor-to-ceiling stained-glass windows of his own design. It was by his own admission his favorite work.

At the height of its success F&G was profiled in a P/A article of August 1958 (part of the magazine's series on "The Architect and His Community"). The sixteen-page article "document[ed] the phenomenal growth" of the firm and described the firm's history, organization, methods, and design philosophy. A year later Texas Architect, published by the Texas Society of Architects (T.S.A.), expanded on this in its February 1959 issue, outlining the process that led to two P/A awards in 1959. The more significant of these was the "Design Award: Commercial" given for Austin's new terminal building at Robert Mueller Municipal Airport.

From their earliest association before WWII until their deaths in the late 1960s Fehr and Granger undertook more than 1,000 projects, and carried a staff of as many as twenty people, nearly half of them registered architects.

With the death of Granger in an automobile accident in 1966, Fehr's workload escalated. Less than three years later, a respiratory illness led to pneumonia and heart failure, at age 64.

== Awards and honors ==
- In 1953 Fehr was selected to lead an architects' tour of West and East Germany under the combined aegis of the American Institute of Architects (A.I.A.) and the Bund Deutscher Architekten (B.D.A.), sponsored by the West German government, to observe post-war reconstruction efforts.
- In 1957 Fehr was elected to the College of Fellows of the A.I.A. in recognition of his design work, and from that date he used the title "Arthur Fehr, F.A.I.A.". (The younger Granger also received his Fellowship a few years later.)
- In 1960 Fehr was a juror for the R. S. Reynolds Memorial Award given to the Swiss architect Jean Tschumi. Chief among the other four jurors was Fehr's own architectural exemplar, Dr. Walter Gropius.
- Keenly interested in the new architecture of Latin America, in particular its exotic concrete structures, Fehr was also given an Honorary Fellowship in La Sociedad de Arquitectos Mexicanos (1963).
- Along with his other professional and civic duties, Fehr served as Secretary-Treasurer, Director, Vice-President and, in 1963, President of the Texas Society of Architects.
- As a practice F&G received many national, state and local design awards including those cited above.

== Partial list of published work ==
Books:

- Good, Albert H. (1999). Park and Recreation Structures, Parts I, II & III. New York: Princeton Architectural Press [reprint of 1938 edition published by National Park Service, U.S. Dept. of the Interior]. pp. Part I, pp. 15, 55, Part II, pp. 9, 22–23, 85, Part III, pp. 50–51, 85, 101, 104–106, 108. ISBN 1-56898-171-6.
- Ford, Katherine Morrow; Creighton, Thomas H. (1954). Quality Budget Houses. New York: Reinhold Publishing Corp. pp. 102–103.
- Ford, Katherine Morrow; Creighton, Thomas H. (1955). Designs For Living. New York: Reinhold Publishing Corp. pp. 32–35, 114, 153.
- Snibbe, Richard W. (1956). Small Commercial Buildings. New York: Reinhold Publishing Corp. pp. 198–199.

Periodicals:

- "St. Elmo-Tel, near Austin, Texas". Architectural Record. 90 (4). New York: F. W. Dodge Corp.: 63–66 October 1941.
- "Air Conditioning Calls For Compactness". Architectural Record. 101 (1). New York: F. W. Dodge Corp.: 76–77 January 1947.
- "Texas House With Native Frankness". Architectural Record. 101 (1). New York: F. W. Dodge Corp.: 78 January 1947.
- "A big cool house for a Texas University professor -- planned to support itself". Architectural Forum. 88 (4). New York: Time Inc.: 138 April 1948.
- "Class 1 Mention Annual Progressive Architecture Awards: 'Clinic Building, Austin, Texas'". Progressive Architecture. 29 (6). New York: Reinhold Publishing Corp.: 53 June 1948.
- "Clinic, Austin, Texas". Progressive Architecture. 29 (12). New York: Reinhold Publishing Corp.: 67–69 December 1948.
- "Church: Austin, Texas". Progressive Architecture. 30 (7). New York: Reinhold Publishing Corp.: 39–42 July 1949.
- "Round-Robin Critique: Four Houses". Progressive Architecture. 31 (8). New York: Reinhold Publishing Corp.: 51–69 August 1950.
- "Playroom, Dallas, Texas". Progressive Architecture. 34 (3). New York: Reinhold Publishing Corp.: 133 March 1953.
- "House: Dallas, Texas". Progressive Architecture. 34 (4). New York: Reinhold Publishing Corp.: 100–105 April 1953.
- "School cafeteria, gymnasium and auditorium". Progressive Architecture. 34 (7). New York: Reinhold Publishing Corp.: 96–99 July 1953.
- "Kreisel Clinic: Austin, Texas". Progressive Architecture. 34 (10). New York: Reinhold Publishing Corp.: 134–136 October 1953.
- "Specialized clinic". Progressive Architecture. 35 (7). New York: Reinhold Publishing Corp.: 92–93 July 1954.
- "For private schooling". Progressive Architecture. 35 (4). New York: Reinhold Publishing Corp.: 96–99 April 1954.
- "Texas: Wooded lot with sharp drop, view to south". Architectural Record. 117 (2). New York: F. W. Dodge Corp.: 168–169 February 1955.
- "How To Learn From A House You May Not Like: How to See the Parts of a House". House Beautiful. 97 (5). New York: Hearst Corp.: 133–138, 237–238 & 251 May 1955.
- "General practice: children's clinic". Progressive Architecture. 37 (2). New York: Reinhold Publishing Corp.: 120–121 February 1956.
- "Capilla, en Texas". Informes de la Construcción (87 (Año 9), [section] 148-41). Madrid: Instituto Tecnico de la Construccion y del Cemento. January 1957.
- "a practice that has grown with its city". Progressive Architecture. 39 (8). New York: Reinhold Publishing Corp.: 89–104 August 1958.
- "Education: award citation". Progressive Architecture. 40 (1). New York: Reinhold Publishing Corp.: 158 January 1959.
- "Special school: 4. Education of children with hearing defects". Architectural Record. 129 (4). New York: F. W. Dodge Corp.: 178–179 April 1961.
- "Special school: 5. Training facility for the mentally retarded". Architectural Record. 129 (4). New York: F. W. Dodge Corp.: 180–181 April 1961.
- "Municipal airport". Progressive Architecture. 42 (11). New York: Reinhold Publishing Corp.: 154–157 November 1961.
- Fehr, Arthur (August 1962). "Architecture for Eight-Year-Olds". Journal of the American Institute of Architects. 39 (1). Washington: 51–54.

== Other sources ==
- Michel Conan, ed. (2000). "Environmentalism in Landscape Architecture" (PDF). Dumbarton Oaks Research Library and Collection, Washington, D.C.
- McClelland, Linda Flint (1998). Building the National Parks, Historic Landscape Design and Construction. Baltimore: Johns Hopkins University Press. pp. 391, 430.

== Note on sources ==
- The bulk of original sketches, preliminaries and working drawings still in existence are in the Arthur Fehr Collection at the Austin History Center, Austin, Texas. This includes work by Arthur Fehr and Fehr & Granger.
- Another significant source of original drawings is the Alexander Architectural Archive, part of the Architecture and Planning Library at the University of Texas at Austin
- The current reprint edition (Princeton Architectural Press) of Good's Park and Recreation Structures, cited above, is in large quarto format with more than six hundred pages and photographs of a far greater number than that. As in the original 1938 edition no attribution is given to any of the hundreds of creators of the works pictured, nor is there an index. As explained in the "Acknowledgement" to the 1938 edition by NPS Assistant Director Conrad L. Wirth: "there was regrettable lack of information to make possible rendering due credit to the many able planning groups, and individuals, earnest artisans and mechanics, responsible for the structures herein illustrated. For this reason, it has seemed fairest to all concerned to credit the material, with few exceptions, to locations rather than to individuals or groups. A kind of equalization of injustice to all has seemed preferable to a discriminatory injustice to some." However its plenitude of photographic documentation makes it very useful, as long as one knows which park to look for. And there is sufficient other evidence (ex.: see Parks For Texas, etc. above) that the structures, furniture and fittings at Bastrop and Buescher State Parks from 1934 to 1937 were Fehr's designs and made under his direction. There is one documented exception: on page 23 of Part II (specifically, Plate II A-14) are a photograph and drawings of a wooden picnic table at Bastrop State Park. This appears to be the same table that Fehr, in an entry in his day book for November 4, 1936, credits to Olin Boese, another NPS architect working primarily at Lake Corpus Christi State Park. (Boese may have also been the first architect of the Bastrop State Park "Refectory"). Presumably this picnic table design was made at the Bastrop furniture shop central to the entire Texas parks system. Fehr did also note in own "day book" (see above) that there was briefly a landscape architect posted there. Finally, Graber Kidwell, formerly a member of the Texas A&M Corps of Cadets and later a Brigadier General in the U. S. Army, also appears frequently in Fehr's day book. He was posted to Bastrop as a civil engineer and thus had a hand in various structures and facilities there.
