= Carrizo Sand =

Geologic formation in Texas and Mexico

- Stratigraphic range: Paleogene
- Type: Formation

Location
- Country: United States, Mexico

The Carrizo Sand is a geologic formation in Texas and Mexico. It preserves fossils dating back to the Paleogene period. It is a major geological formation of the Carrizo-Wilcox Aquifer.

== See also ==
- List of fossiliferous stratigraphic units in Mexico
