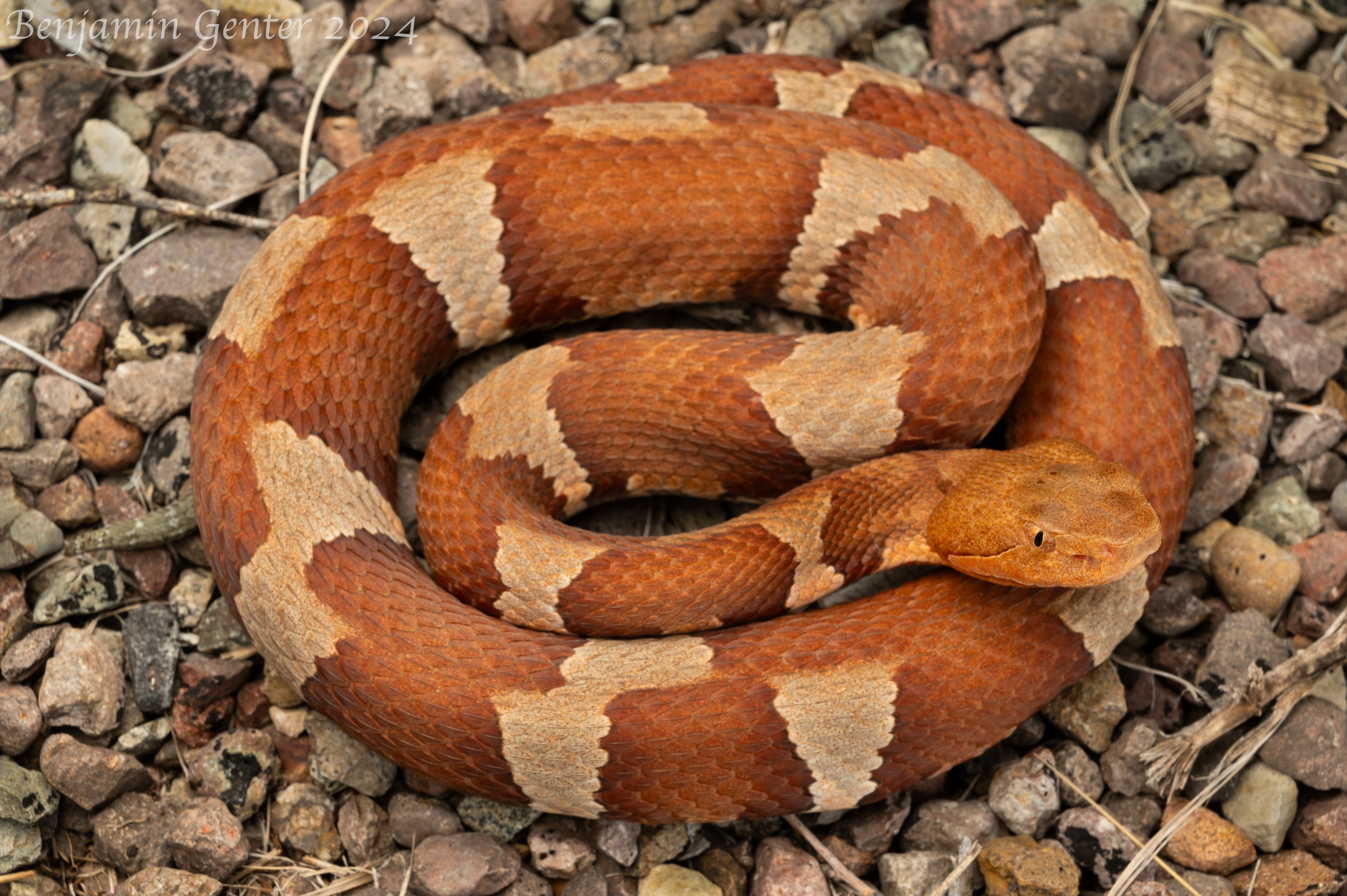

Scientific classification
- Kingdom: Animalia
- Phylum: Chordata
- Class: Reptilia
- Order: Squamata
- Suborder: Serpentes
- Family: Viperidae
- Genus: Agkistrodon
- Species: A. laticinctus

Binomial name
- Agkistrodon laticinctus Gloyd & Conant, 1934

Synonyms
- Agkistrodon mokasen laticinctus Gloyd & Conant, 1934; Agkistrodon mokeson laticinctus – Gloyd & Conant, 1943; Agkistrodon contortrix laticinctus – Klauber, 1948; Ancistrodon contortrix laticinctus – Schmidt, 1953; Agkistrodon mokasen pictigastor – Gloyd and Conant, 1943; Agkistrodon contortrix pictigastor – Klauber, 1948; Ancistrodon contortrix pictigastor – Schmidt, 1953

= Agkistrodon laticinctus =

Species of snake

Agkistrodon laticinctus, commonly known as the broad-banded copperhead, is a venomous pit viper species, formerly considered a subspecies of Agkistrodon contortrix, which is found in the central United States, from Kansas, through Oklahoma and throughout central Texas.

== Etymology and nomenclature ==
Agkistrodon is from the Greek words ancistro which means "hook", and odon meaning "tooth" referring to the snake's fangs. The discrepancy between the spelling ancistro (correct) versus agkistro (incorrect), originates from a typographical error or misspelling in the original description of the genus published in 1799. The name laticinctus is from the Latin lati meaning "broad" or "wide", and cinctus meaning a girdle, belt, or waistcloth, in reference to the broad bands of the dorsal pattern of the species, and relative to the contorted or twisted dorsal pattern of the eastern copperhead (Agkistrodon contortrix).

The standardized English name of Agkistrodon laticinctus is Broad-banded copperhead. As the Latin name, the English name emphasizes the broad bands that readily distinguishes this species from the eastern copperhead (Agkistrodon contortrix). Colloquial names for the broad-banded copperhead include: copperhead moccasin, copperhead snake, dry-land moccasin, highland moccasin, moccasin, rattlesnake pilot, red eye, Texas copperhead and thunder snake.

== Description ==
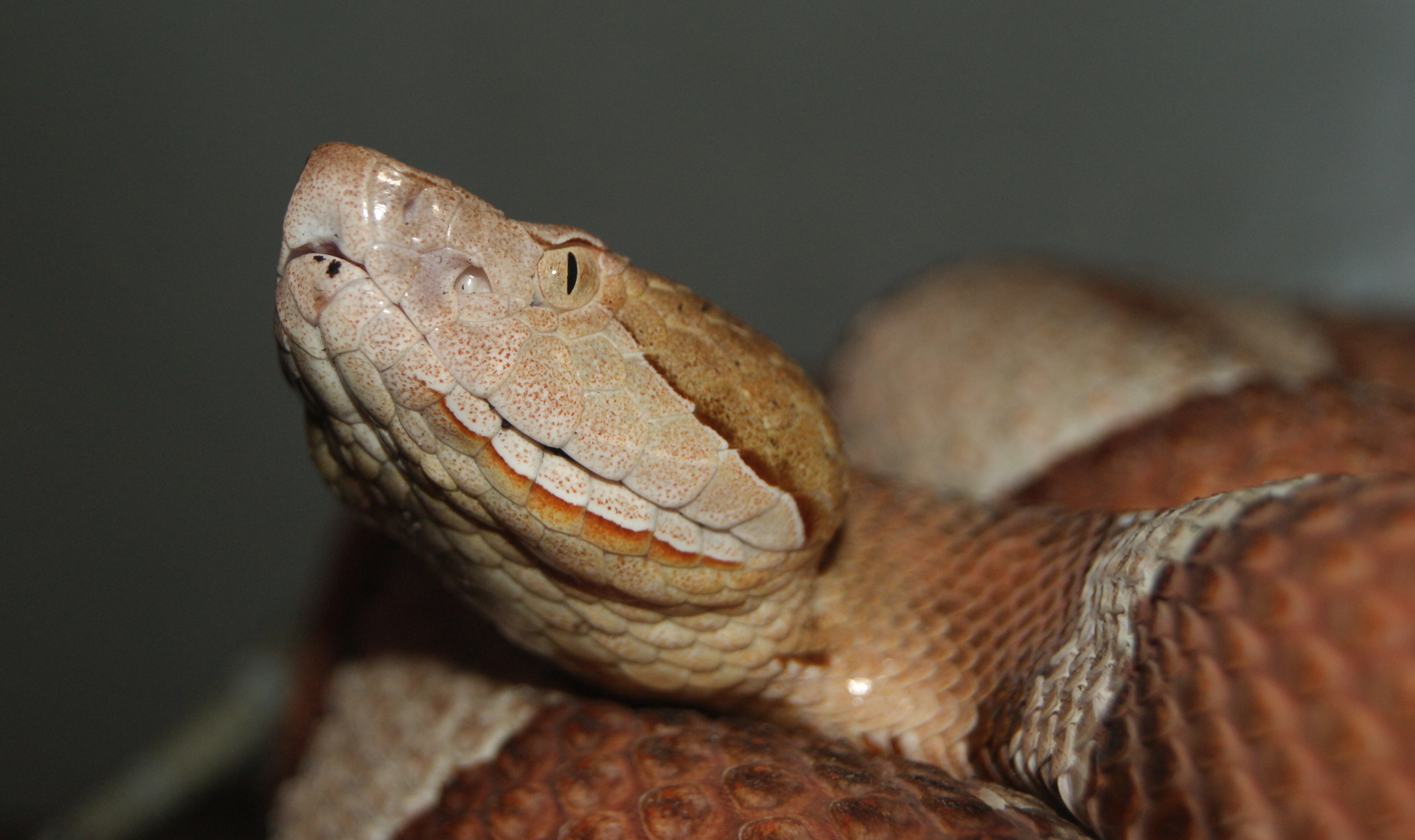
Head of a broad-banded copperhead (Agkistrodon laticinctus)

This form is typically a light tan in color, with darker brown, wide crossbands, which gives it its common name. The actual color varies, by locality, from a red-brown, to a gray-brown. It overlaps with the eastern copperhead (A. contortrix) in the southern reaches of its range, making specimens there difficult to distinguish, but generally A. contortrix has banding that narrows at the spine, creating hourglass shapes, whereas A. laticinctus has even bands. As juveniles, all species of Agkistrodon have a bright green-yellow color to their tail tips, believed to be used as a lure to attract prey items to approach within striking range. The color fades to a grey or brown at about a year of age.

Size: Adults typically range from 45‒75 cm (17.7‒29.5 in) in total body length, with a record individual of 94.6 cm (37.25 in) for the species. Agkistrodon laticinctus are sexually dimorphic, with males ranging slightly larger than females in total body length. One study measured 161 male and 119 female, adult specimens (>30 cm), and found 62.7% of the males ranged 50‒75 cm. (19.7‒29.5 in), and 76.5% of the females ranged 45‒65 cm (17.7‒25.6 in) in total body length. The same study found the tail length of males was only slightly longer than females, with tails ranging from 11‒17% (13.9) of total body length in males, and 11‒16% (13.3) in females, and Trans-Pecos populations averaging slightly longer tails, 15.3% for males and 14.6% for females. Copperheads tend to exhibit an east to west reduction in size, with the eastern copperhead (A. contortrix) averaging slightly larger in total body length than the broad-banded copperhead (A. laticinctus), and populations of A. laticinctus from Oklahoma and central Texas averaging slightly larger than those from the Trans-Pecos region and Mexico.

Scutellation: Agkistrodon laticinctus have nine large plates, symmetrically arranged on the crown of the head (two internasals, two prefrontals, one frontal, two supraoculars, two parietals): a character they share with all other species in the genus Agkistrodon, and which distinguishes Agkistrodon from the majority of pit vipers (Crotalinae), including all New World pit vipers except the genus Sistrurus (pigmy and massasauga rattlesnakes). A loreal scale is present in A. laticinctus and all other species in the genus except the cottonmouths (A. piscivorus and A. conanti). Postoculars and suboculars scales in Agkistrodon laticinctus tend to form one continuous row of 2‒6 scales, numbering 4 in about half of specimens. Supralabials range from 7‒10, numbering 8 in most specimens, and infralabials range from 8‒12, numbering 10 in most specimens. The dorsal body scales are keeled with paired apical pits. The keeling is strongest and most apparent on the vertebral scales, often becoming weaker and occasionally absent in the lateral and anterior regions. The number of midbody dorsal scale rows is typically 23 but can be 21 or 25 in a few individuals, except in populations from the Trans-Pecos region in which nearly half the specimens have 21 or 22 rows. Ventral scales: male range 138‒155, average 146.4 (Trans-Pecos populations averaging 149.3), female range138‒155, average 145.5 (Trans-Pecos average 147.3), and subcaudals: male range 42‒62 average 48 (Trans Pecos average 54), female range 40‒57 average 45 (Trans-Pecos average 50).

== Distribution ==
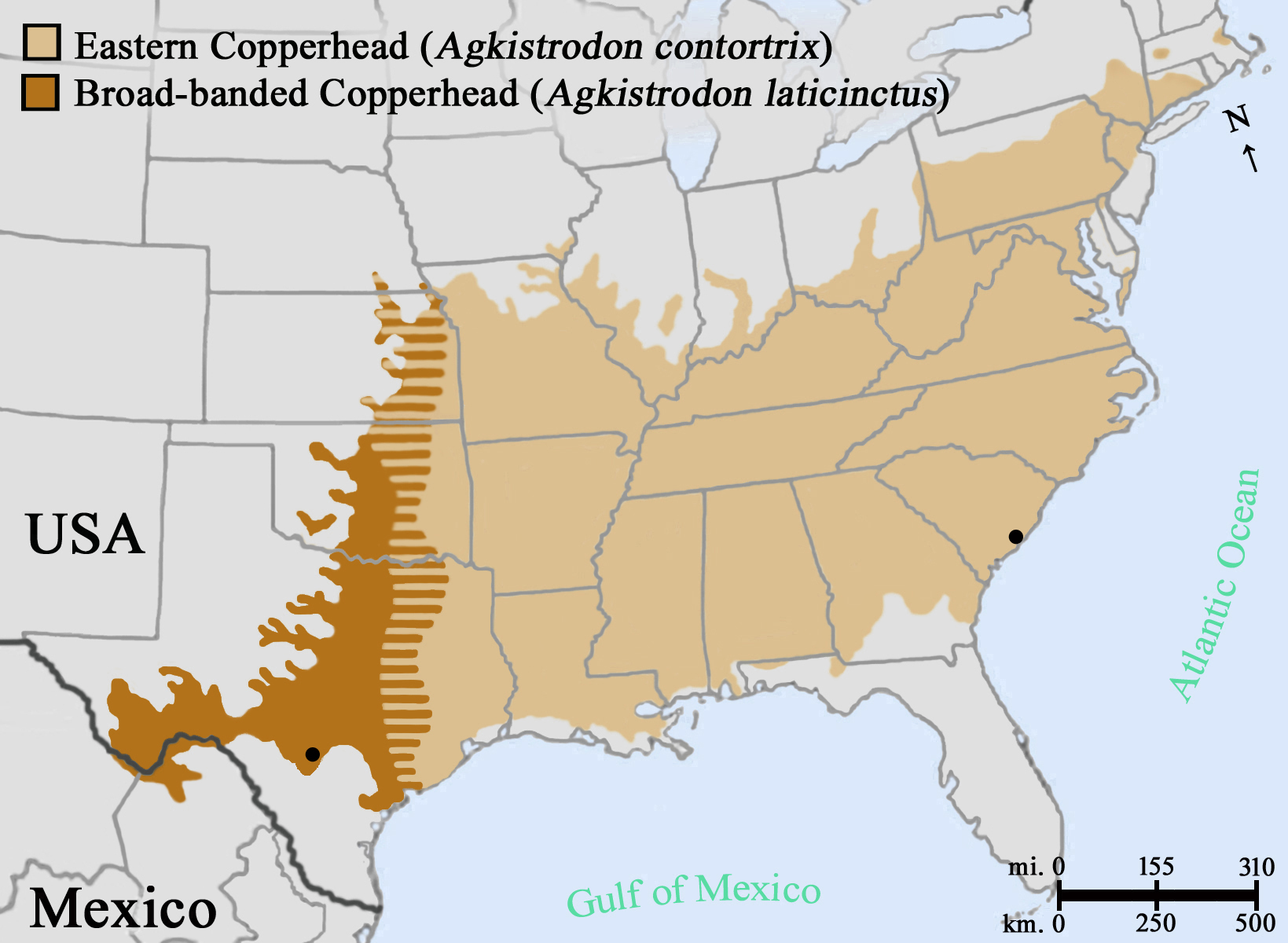
Distribution of Copperheads, black dots represent type localities, cross hatching represent a zone of hybridization.

The broad-banded copperhead (A. laticinctus) is endemic to North America, where it occurs in the South Central states of Oklahoma and Texas in the USA, and the adjacent margins of the Mexican states of Chihuahua and Coahuila. It ranges from north-central Oklahoma, south to the Edwards Plateau in Texas, and west into southern counties of the Trans-Pecos region of Texas, including Brewster, Jeff Davis, Pecos, Presidio, and Terrell counties. Much of its distribution (and the zone of hybridization) is situated in something of a transition zone between the Eastern Temperate Forests of the US and the Great Plains and Chihuahua Desert to the west.

In Mexico it is known only from the states of Chihuahua and Coahuila. Copperheads were anticipated to occur in Mexico for several decades before verified records were confirmed from the remote regions south of Big Bend as recently as 1986. In Chihuahua all records are from riparian areas along the Rio Grande and adjacent canyons in the municipality of Manuel Benavides. In Coahuila it has been reported from several localities deeper in the interior including the Sierra del Burro, Sierra del Carmen, and Sierra Jardín, in the municipalities of Acuña, Müzquiz, Ocampo, and Zaragrza.

There is a wide area of integration with its sister taxon, the eastern copperhead (Agkistrodon contortrix) on the eastern and northern boundaries of its range. In one study, genetic samples from 38 copperhead specimens collected throughout its distribution in eastern Kansas, indicated all copperheads from that state were either eastern copperheads (Agkistrodon contortrix), or hybrids of eastern and broad-banded copperheads (A. contortrix x laticinctus). That study did not identify any genetically pure broad-banded copperheads (Agkistrodon laticinctus) in Kansas.

== Ecology and natural history ==
Longevity records published 1992, based on data from North American zoos, museums, and other institutions at that time included a male Agkistrodon contortrix laticinctus from the San Diego Zoo that lived 21 years, 6 month, and 9 days, and a male Agkistrodon contortrix pictigaster in the Philadelphia Zoo that lived 20 years, 8 months, and 10 days. Although not considered arboreal, Agkistrodon laticinctus is capable of climbing and has been observed coiled and resting in trees, 7 or 8 feet above the ground where no birds, nests, lizards, or other potential food was apparent. Likewise, it is not an aquatic species, but it is capable of crossing large bodies of water and has been found swimming in Lake Texoma, Texas, more than a quarter of a mile from shore.

=== Habitat ===
Secretive and nocturnal, it prefers lightly wooded habitats, typically with a good amount of ground debris for cover, not far from a permanent water source. It typically avoids regions with a significant population of humans.

=== Diet ===
The diet of A. laticinctus can differ between various populations and the available prey. They are largely ambush predators, but actively forage on occasion, particularly juveniles. Odor, sight, and heat are the primary methods of locating prey. As with many species of snakes, juveniles tend to opportunistically feed on wider variety of prey, becoming more discriminating with maturity. Scavenging has been recorded in the species. Females usually fast, or eat significantly less, when gravid. Like many venomous snakes, they typically bite and release larger prey, letting the venom subdue it without the risk of a struggle and injury to the snake, but birds and smaller prey are often seized, held until dead, then swallowed. Although caudal luring is well documented in the eastern copperhead, observations of this behavior in the broad-banded copperhead are lacking.

The broad-banded copperhead is a diet generalist, opportunistically feeding on a variety of invertebrates and vertebrates, although small rodents such as rats and mice make up the greater part of its diet. Small mammals including voles and shrews have been recorded in the diet. Ground-nesting birds and small passerines are occasionally eaten as well. Reptiles and amphibians documented in the diet include lizards, snakes, frogs, toads, and salamanders. Insect prey largely consists of caterpillars and cicadas in the nymphal stage, or the recently metamorphosed soft-bodied adults, but other insects and arachnids are occasionally eaten as well. In captivity, A. laticinctus have been sustained for many years on a diet of frozen mice, thawed before feeding.

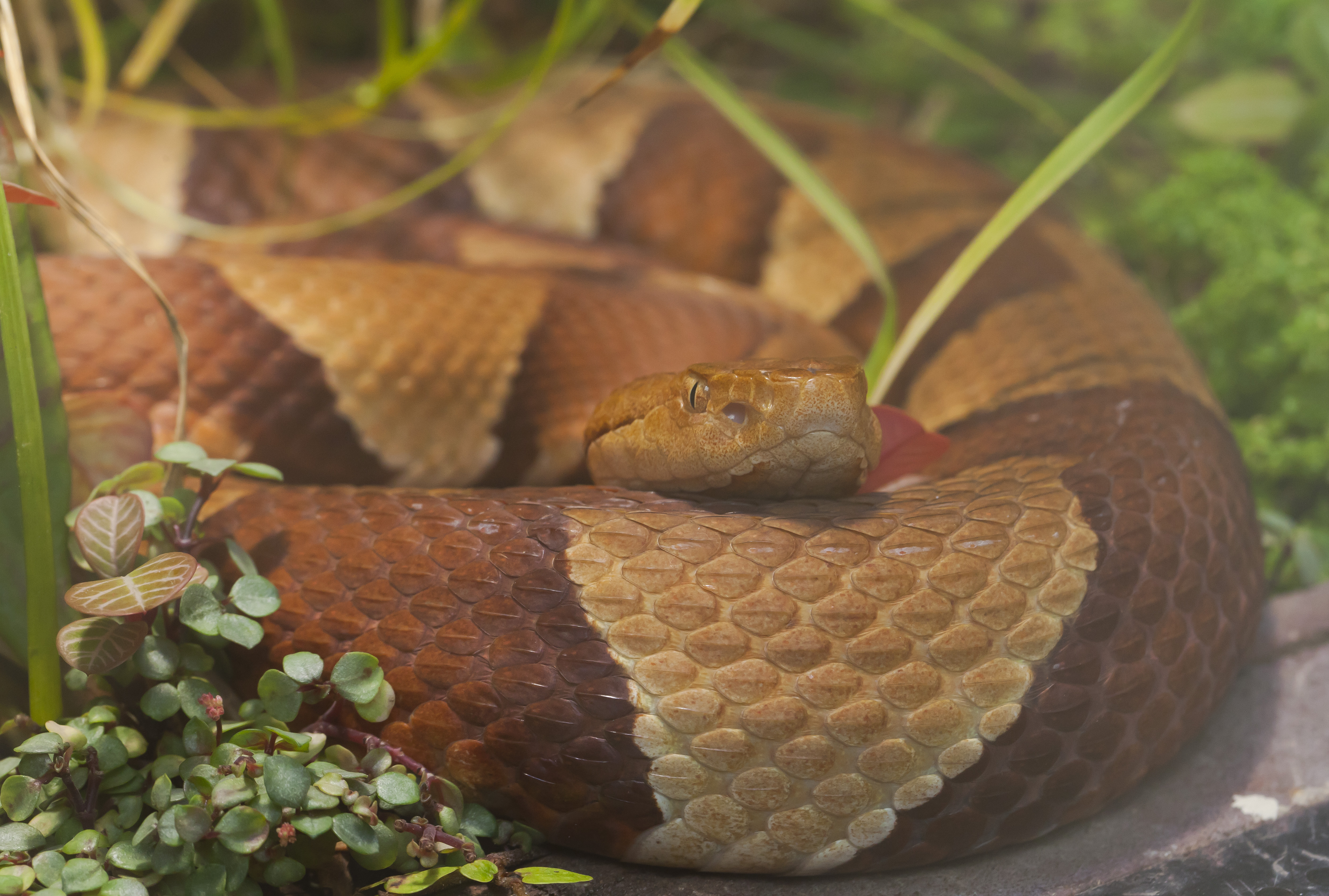
Agkistrodon laticinctus, Hellabrunn Zoo.

A few reports on the diet and feeding habits of A. laticinctus include accounts of prey items as diverse as a rock rattlesnake (Crotalus lepidus) and Brazilian free-tailed bats (Tadarida brasiliensis). Charles Carpenter reported on a large male from Marshall County, Oklahoma that regurgitated cicadas and a spider. One was observed in Bastrop State Park, Texas with a white-throated sparrow (Zonotrichia albicollis) struggling to escape: "The snake had the bird by the back of the head, holding on tenaciously, and periodically clamping its jaws tighter as if trying to sink its fangs and teeth deeper." About three minutes passed before the bird was dead. In a radio telemetry study, a Texas horned lizard (Phrynosoma cornutum) which had been fitted with a tracking device and monitored for eight months, was ultimately located in the digestive track of a A. laticinctus. The snake later passed the tracking device without harm. An adult female A. laticinctus, 65 cm. in total length, was found by the side of the road in the process of consuming a Texas long-nosed snake (Rhinocheilus lecontei), estimated to be 42-47 cm. in total length. The copperhead, undisturbed by the presence of the observers, continued to eat while it was measured. It was unknown if the copperhead had killed the long-nosed snake, or if it was scavenging roadkill. A copperhead was observed eating a cliff swallow (Petrochelidon pyrrhonota), too young to fly, found on the floor of Santa Elena Canyon in Big Bend National Park, Texas. The snake salvaged the baby bird that had apparently been dropped by one of several Chihuahuan ravens (Corvus cryptoleucus) seen raiding swallow nests high on the canyon walls.

=== Reproduction ===
They are ovoviviparous, giving birth to a litter of up to eight young in the early fall.

== Venom ==
Like most pit viper species, A. laticinctus has a hemotoxic venom, which is delivered through hinged, hollow fangs set in the front of their jaws. The fangs work like hypodermic needles, injecting the venom in a single, quick striking motion. Copperhead venom is not considered to be life-threatening to an otherwise healthy adult, but it can cause localized swelling, necrosis, and severe pain. Any bite from a venomous snake should be considered serious and medical treatment sought. There is no antivenin specifically manufactured for copperheads. However, CroFab, which makes use of the venom from the cottonmouth (Agkistrodon piscivorus), can be used in cases of a severe envenomation.

== Gallery ==
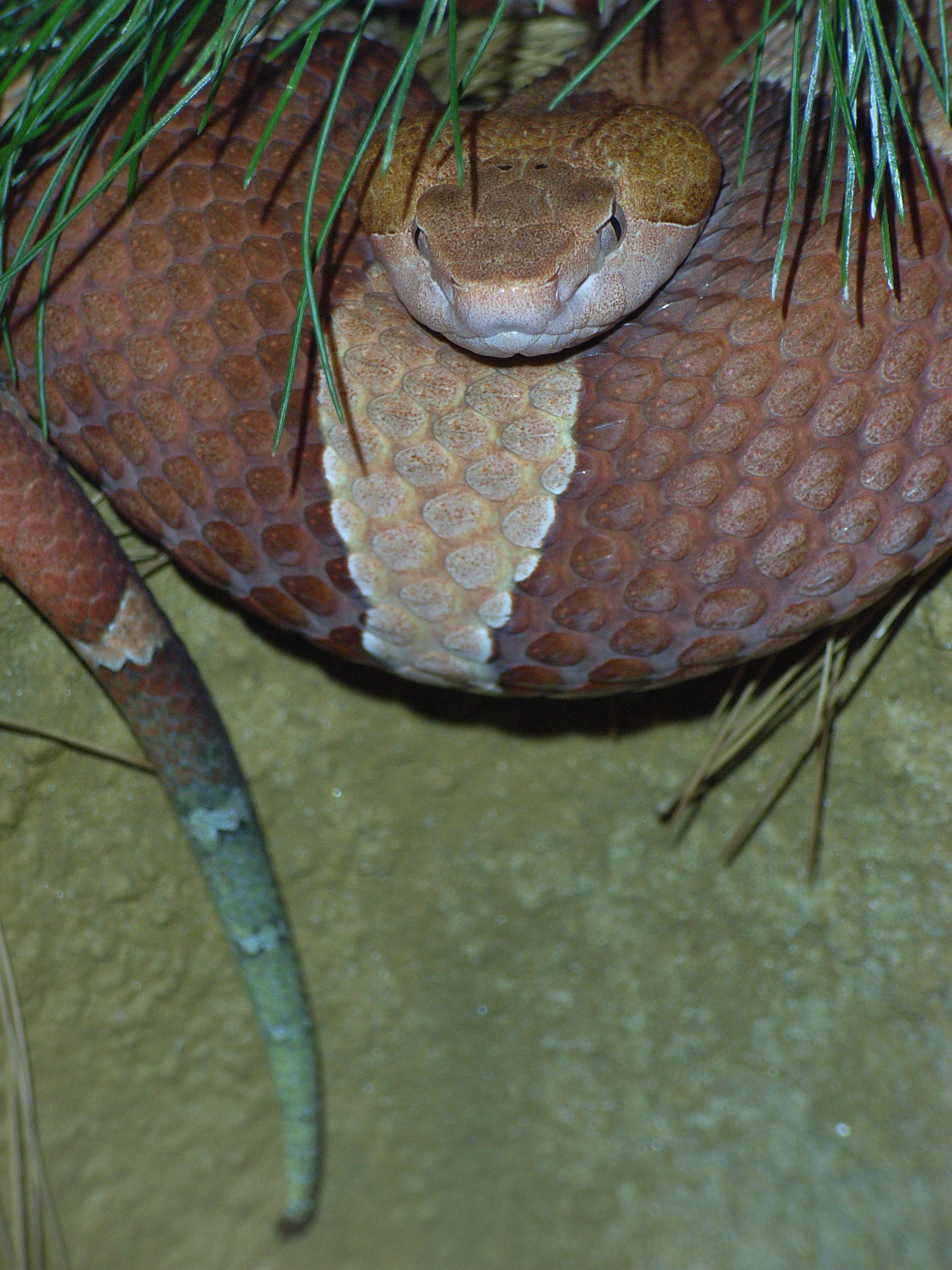
Broad-banded copperhead

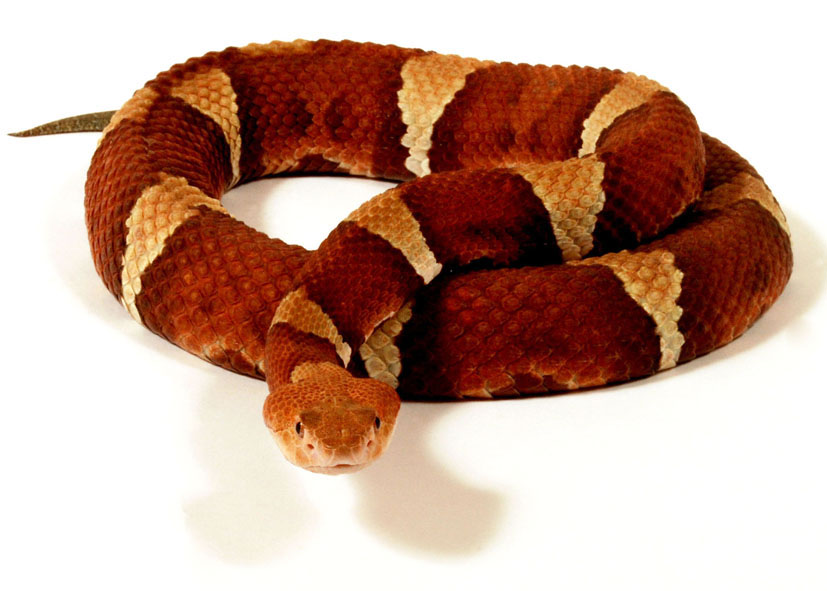
Broad-banded copperhead (Agkistrodon laticinctus)

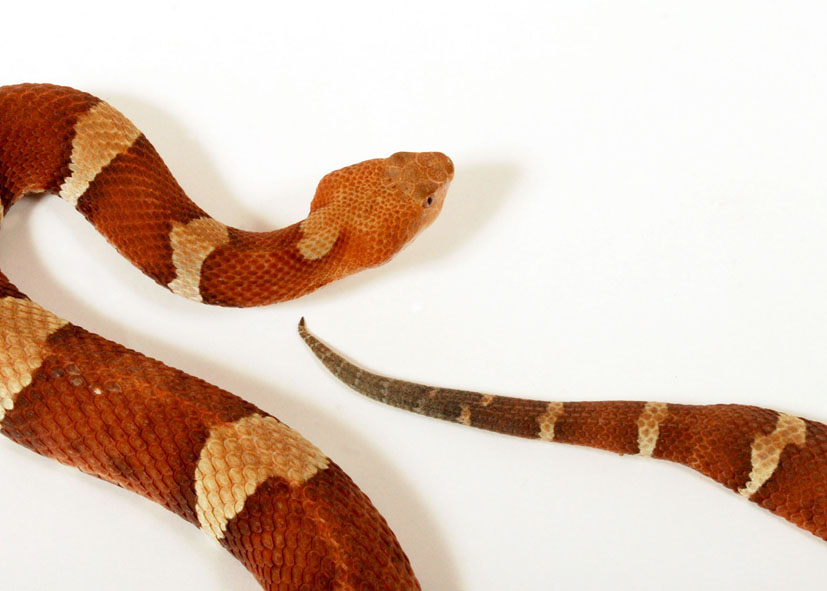
Closeup of a Broad-banded copperhead (Agkistrodon laticinctus)

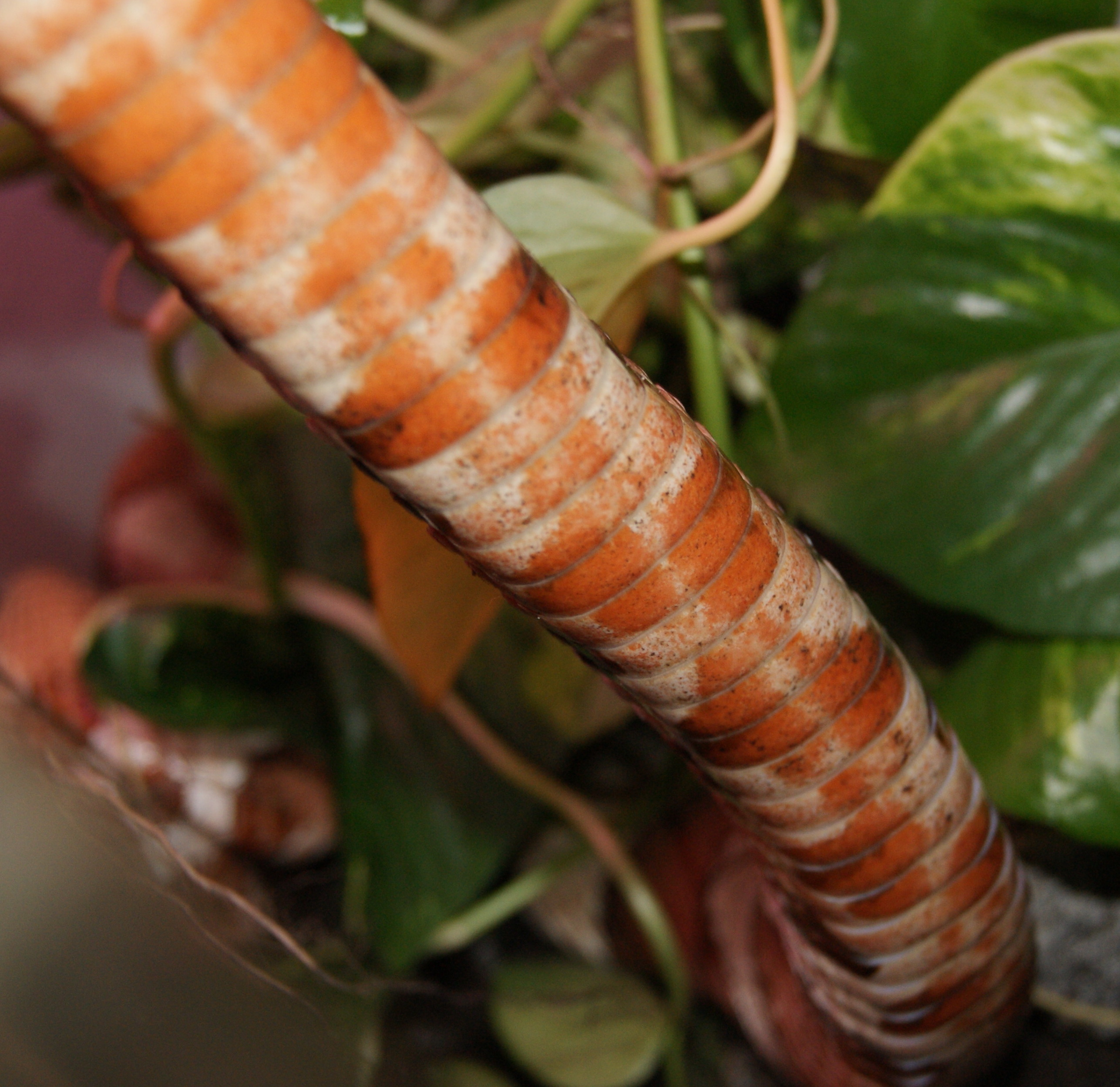
Belly or ventral view of a Broad-banded copperhead (Agkistrodon laticinctus)

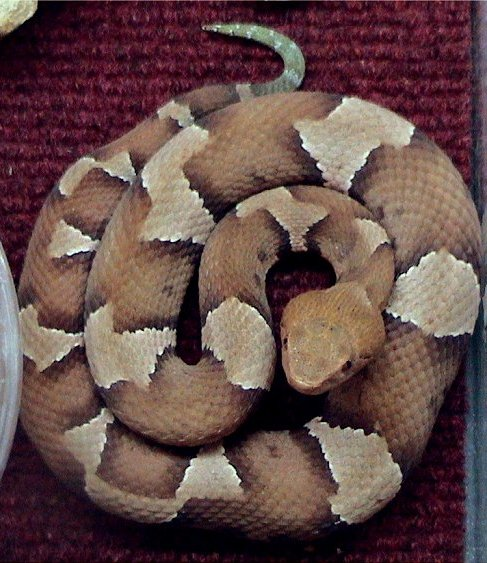
A juvenile Agkistrodon laticinctus with yellow tail

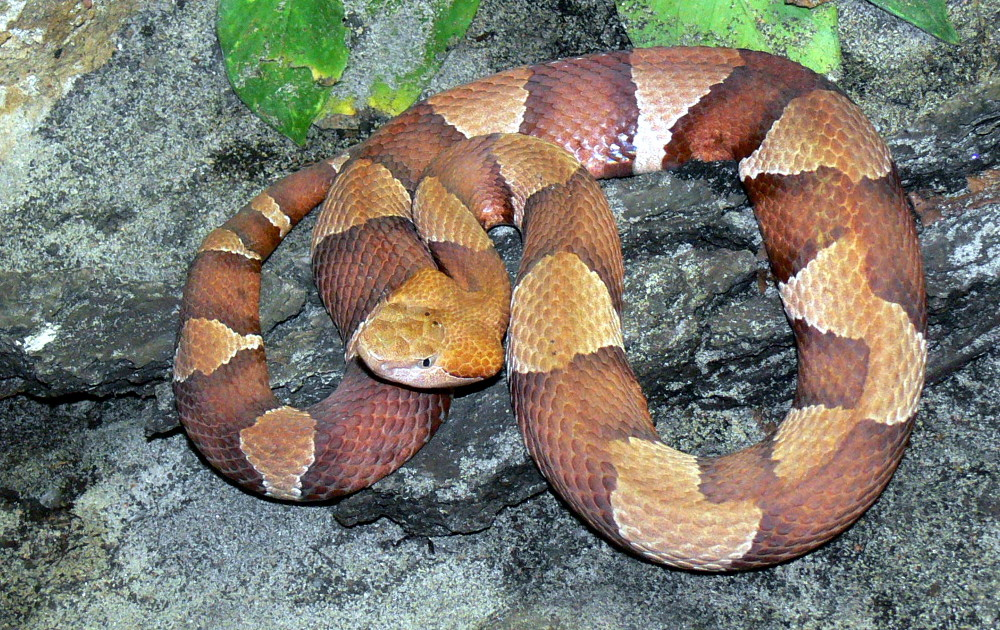
Broad-banded copperhead (Agkistrodon laticinctus)

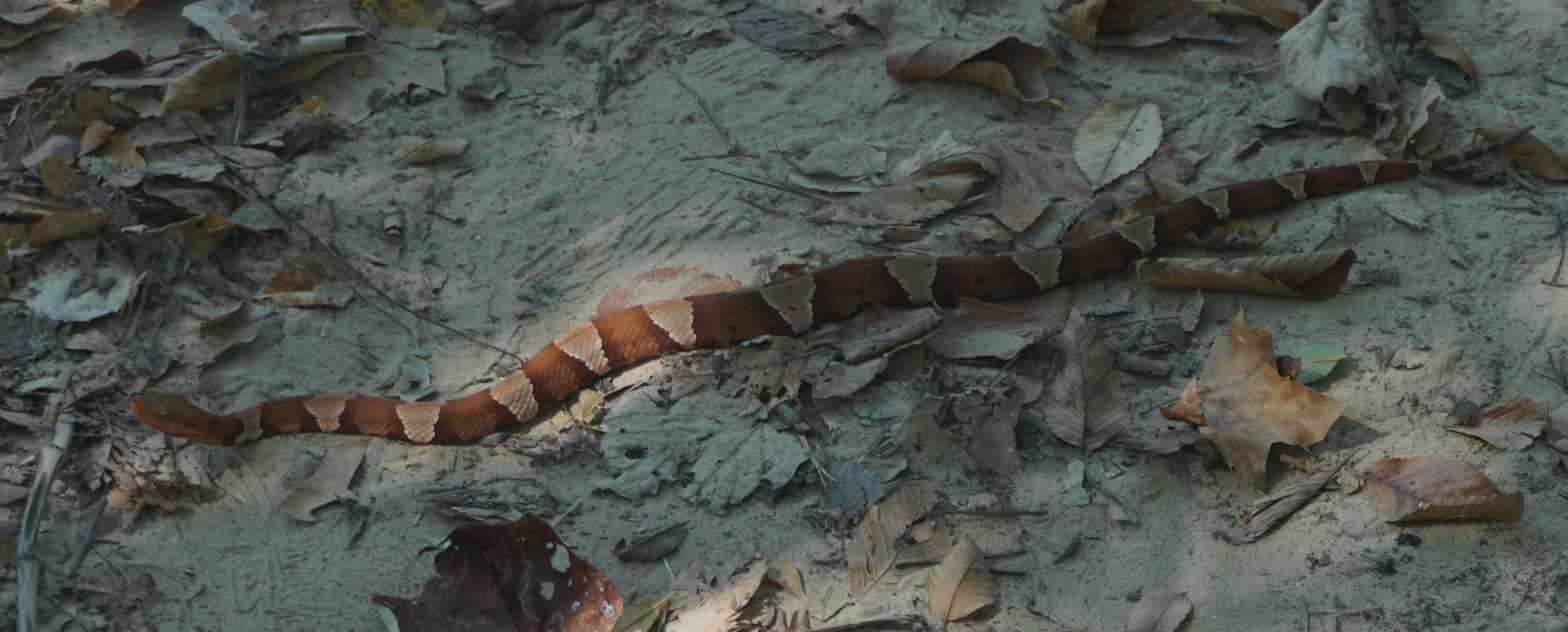
A broad-banded copperhead at Dinosaur Valley State Park, Somervell Co., Texas (10 October 2020)
