= Moore's Crossing, Texas =

- Unincorporated community
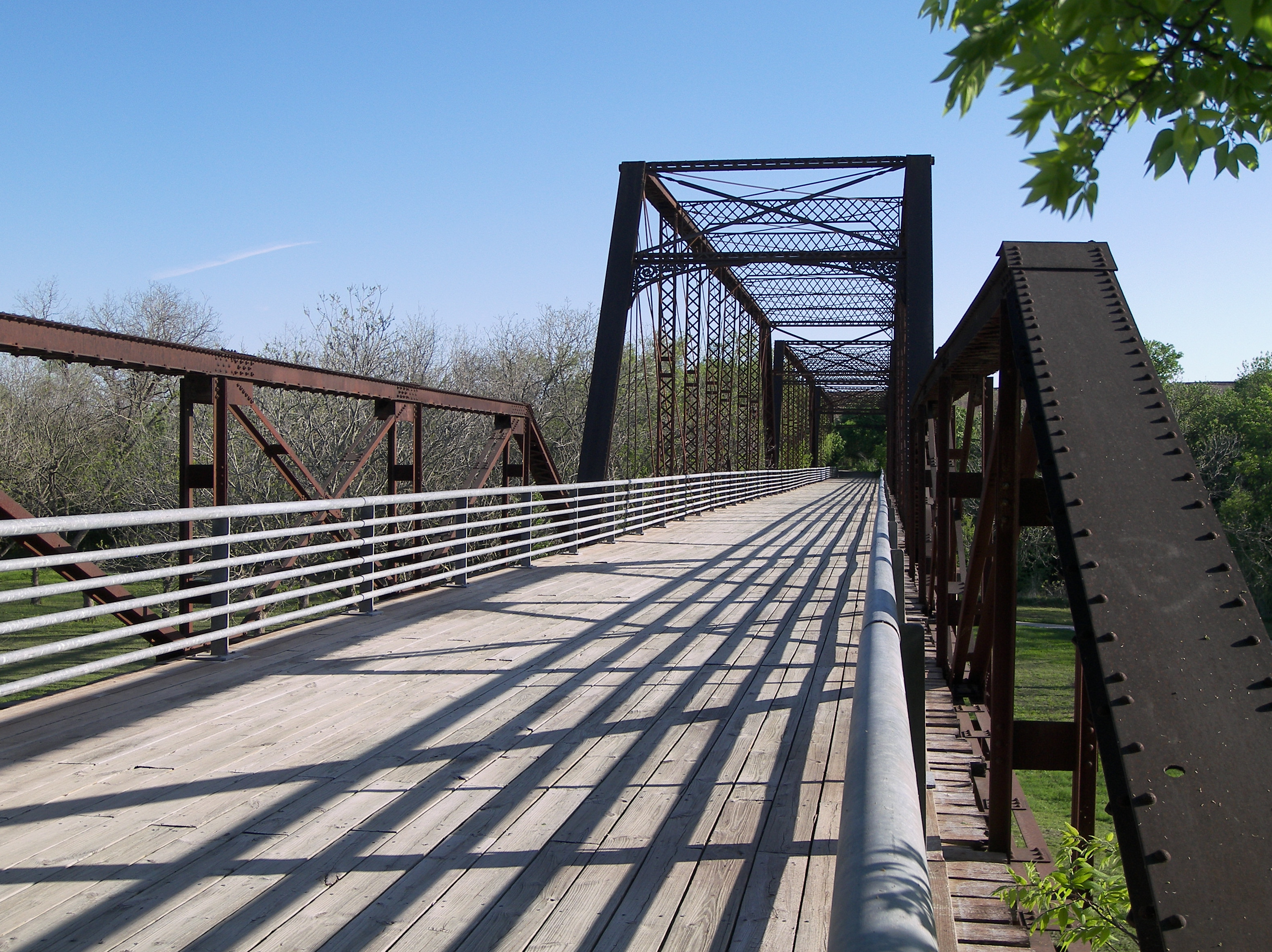
- The Moore's Crossing Bridge

- Location within Texas Location within the United States
- Coordinates: 30°10′8″N 97°39′50″W
- Country: United States
- State: Texas
- County: Travis
- Elevation: 443 ft (135 m)
- Time zone: UTC-6 (Central (CST))
  - Summer (DST): UTC-5 (CDT)
- Area codes: 512 & 737
- GNIS feature ID: 1380887

Moore's Crossing is an unincorporated community in Travis County, in the U.S. state of Texas. According to the Handbook of Texas, the community had a population of 25 in 2000. It is located within the Greater Austin metropolitan area.

== History ==
The Moore's Crossing Historic District is located near the community.

== Geography ==
Moore's Crossing is located on Farm to Market Road 973, 9 mi (14 km) southeast of Austin in southeastern Travis County.

== Education ==
Today, the community is served by the Del Valle Independent School District. Schools that serve the community are Hillcrest Elementary School, Del Valle Middle School, and Del Valle High School.
