= Dunlap, Travis County, Texas =

- Unincorporated community
- Location within Texas Location within the United States
- Coordinates: 30°14′56″N 97°33′35″W
- Country: United States
- State: Texas
- County: Travis
- Elevation: 410 ft (120 m)
- Time zone: UTC-6 (Central (CST))
  - Summer (DST): UTC-5 (CDT)
- Area codes: 512 & 737
- GNIS feature ID: 1378236

Dunlap is an unincorporated community in Travis County, in the U.S. state of Texas. According to the Handbook of Texas, the community had a population of 80 in 2000. It is located within the Greater Austin metropolitan area.

== Geography ==
Dunlap is located on Farm to Market Road 969, 12 mi (19 km) east of Austin in eastern Travis County.

== Education ==
Today, the community is served by the Del Valle Independent School District. Schools that serve the community are Joseph Gilbert Elementary School, Dailey Middle School, and Del Valle High School.
