= Del Valle, Texas =

Coordinates: 30.21°N 97.65°W

Del Valle
- Edge city
- Interactive map of Del Valle
- Country: United States
- State: Texas
- County: Travis
- Settled: 1812
- Austin purchase: 1942

Government
  - Type: Austin extraterritorial jurisdiction

Area (Historical)
  - Total: 44,000 acres (18,000 ha)
- Elevation: 482 ft (147 m)

Population (2010-2019)
  - Total: 300
  - Density: 4.4/sq mi (1.7/km^{2})
  - Traffic: 200,000+ vehicles (AADT)
  - Air traffic: 17,343,729 passengers
- Time zone: UTC-6 (Central (CST))
  - Summer (DST): UTC-5 (CDT)
- ZIP code: 78617

Del Valle (/ˌdɛl ˈvæli/ del VAL-ee) is an airport-defined edge city of Austin and part of the Greater Austin area. It was founded upon the 19th-century Santiago Del Valle leagues, the largest granted land parcel in Travis County.

It is an unincorporated area in southeastern Travis County, Texas, United States. It has no local government of its own and no official boundaries. However, Austin has annexed portions, including the site of Austin-Bergstrom International Airport in 1990. After that, most recently in 2013, the city added more Del Valle territory to the east (8 to 13 miles southeast of downtown Austin). Recent industrial developments include those by Tesla, which has received significant tax relief from Del Valle Independent School District, rated at $60 million.

The 2010 census estimated a population of 300. Del Valle is located 7 miles (11 km) southeast of Downtown Austin on Texas State Highway 71 and is near the Colorado River. It is located at (30.21, -97.65) with an elevation of 482 feet. Del Valle has a three-level diamond interchange that includes frontage roads at-grade with interchange. A flyover ramp was added to allow eastbound SH 71 traffic to join SH 130 north.

== History ==
in 1832 ten leagues of land were transferred to Santiago Del Valle, then secretary of the Mexican government of Coahuila y Texas. Santiago Del Valle never lived on the land he was granted. In 1835 he sold nine leagues to Michel Menard, who in 1838 helped found Galveston, Texas. Thomas F. McKinney in 1839 purchased the Del Valle grant. McKinney sold all but about 2,800 acres before his death in 1873.

The community of Del Valle, established in the mid-1870s, was named after the land grant. In 1878 a post office opened with William Givens serving as postmaster. By the mid-1880s Del Valle, with 50 residents, also had three churches, two cotton gins, one general store, and one steam gristmill. The primary crops shipped by farmers in the Del Valle area were cotton and grain. By 1900 Del Valle had 75 residents. About 150 people lived in Del Valle in 1927.

The Great Depression hampered the community, which had 25 residents in the early 1930s. In 1942 the Del Valle Army Air Base opened (later renamed Bergstrom Air Force Base), leading to an increase in the area's population. In the mid-1940s Del Valle had 125 residents. In the mid-1950s Del Valle had 200 residents. From the early 1970s to the early 1990s, Del Valle's population estimates hovered around 300. The number of businesses grew from 12 in 1970 to 35 in 1990. The population was 2,476 in 2000 and had 158 businesses. The military base was closed in 1993, to be re-opened as Austin–Bergstrom International Airport in 1999 which brought growth to Del Valle and Southeast Austin.

== Services ==
=== Tesla factory ===
In 2014, Tesla evaluated a 1,500-acre (600 ha; 2 sq mi; 6 km^{2}) manufacturing site on U.S. Route 79 at Frame Switch (), located between the towns of Hutto and Taylor, north-east of the Greater Austin center as its next factory. However, Tesla chose to build its first Gigafactory (now named Gigafactory Nevada) near Sparks, Nevada which is by Reno in 2014.

By June 2020, another location, one near the Del Valle area of Austin was being considered, a 2,100-acre (850 ha; 3.3 sq mi; 8.5 km^{2}) site bordering Harold Green Road (later renamed Tesla Road) and Texas State Highway 130. On June 16, 2020, the Commissioners' court of Travis County discussed a possible incentives package for Tesla. In July 2020, the Del Valle Independent School District approved a tax incentives package worth $68 million, should the Tesla Gigafactory be built. On July 22, 2020, during Tesla's second quarter 2020 earnings call, the company announced that location had been selected for its fifth Gigafactory.

By the end of July 2020, construction had begun. The Tesla Gigafactory received state tax incentives worth about $50 million through the Texas Tax Code Chapter 313 program. Tesla announced a manufacturing training program in cooperation with Austin Community College District on June 15, 2021. The program was expected to start in August 2021 and the course was to last 14 weeks. The first fully completed Tesla Model Y rolled off the line at Giga Texas in the last week of August 2021 under trial production. In December 2021, Elon Musk estimated that Giga Texas will require a total investment of at least $10B and may employ as many as 20,000 employees within the company.

In early 2022, Tesla battery suppliers CATL and Panasonic were reportedly scouting sites for battery factories in North America, including Kansas, Oklahoma, Mexico and Canada. Panasonic announced in July 2022 that the company selected De Soto, Kansas (at the former Sunflower Army Ammunition Plant) to build a battery factory. Large subsidies and abatements were granted to Panasonic, organized by Governor Laura Kelly.

=== Education ===
Del Valle had its own school in the mid-1880s. In 1907 the area common school district had two schools, one for nine White students and another for 108 Black students. Throughout much of its history, Del Valle was served by the Colorado Common School District Number 36 and the Hornsby-Dunlap Common School District. In April 1963 the school district was renamed Del Valle Independent #910.

Del Valle is served by the Del Valle Independent School District. Residents are zoned to Hornsby-Dunlap Elementary School, Del Valle Middle School, and Del Valle High School.

The East Travis Gateway Library District operates the Elroy Library and the Garfield Library near Del Valle.

=== Austin–Bergstrom International Airport ===
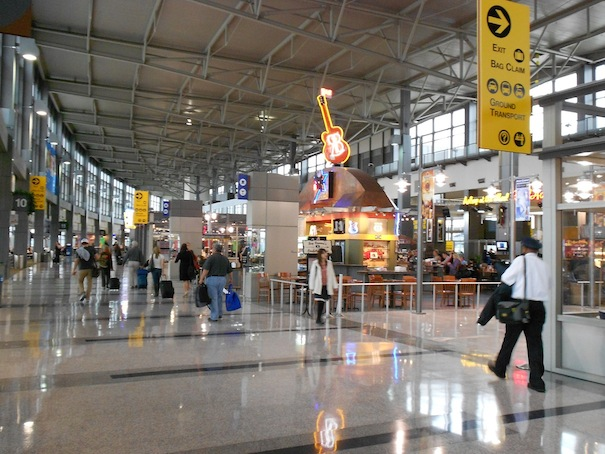
Austin–Bergstrom International Airport

Austin–Bergstrom International Airport or ABIA (IATA: AUS, ICAO: KAUS, FAA LID: AUS, formerly BSM) is a Class C international airport located in Austin, Texas, United States (the capital of Texas), and serving the Greater Austin metropolitan area, the 34th-largest metropolitan area in the United States. Located about 5 miles (8 km) southeast of Downtown Austin, it covers 4,242 acres (1,717 ha) and has two runways and three helipads. It is on the site of what was Bergstrom Air Force Base. The airport and Air Force base were named after Captain John August Earl Bergstrom, an officer who served with the 19th Bombardment Group. The airport replaced Robert Mueller Municipal Airport as Austin's main airport.

=== Circuit of the Americas ===
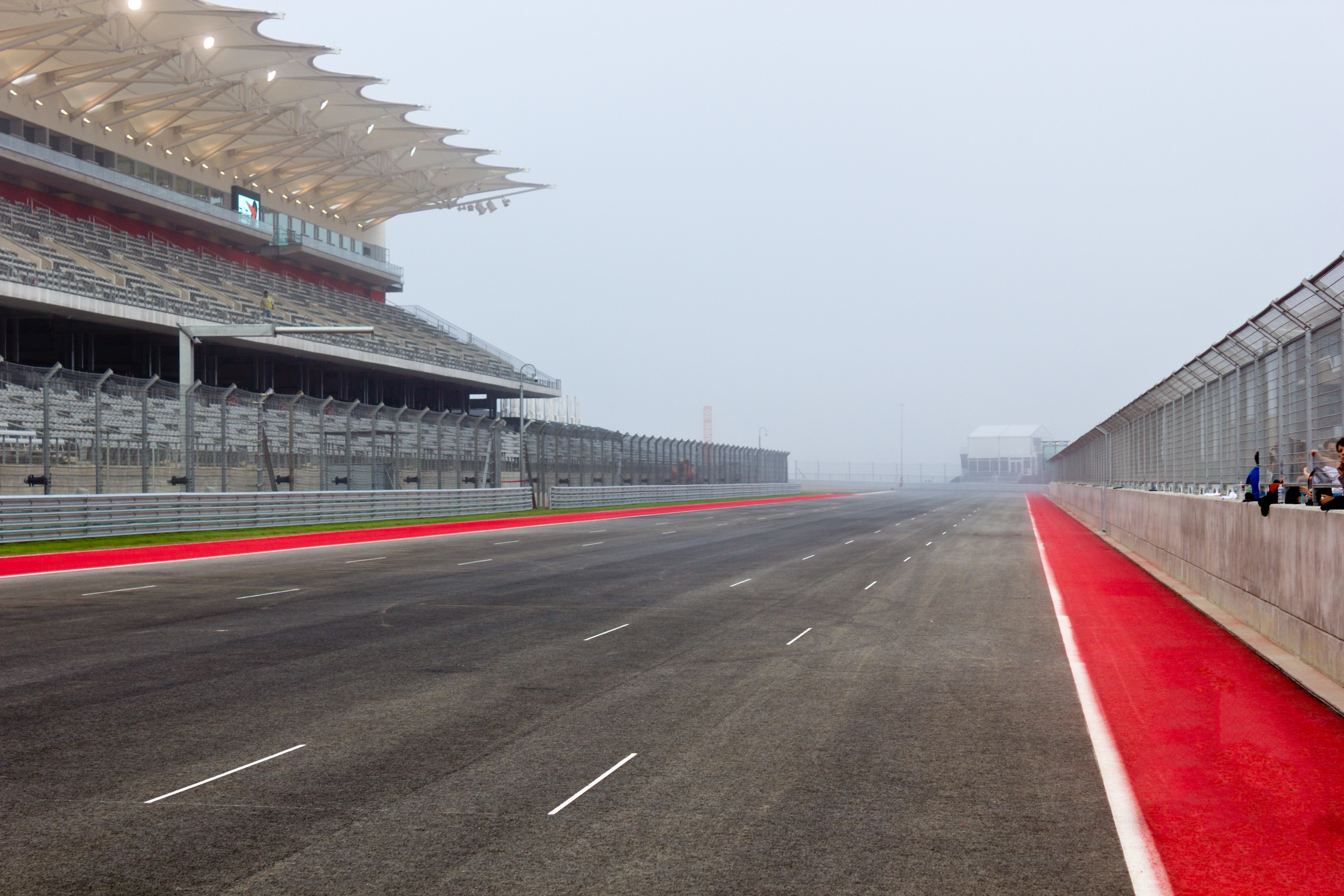
Circuit of the Americas

Circuit of the Americas (COTA) is a unidirectional, grade 1 FIA specification 3.427-mile (5.515 km) motor racing facility located in Elroy, on the southeastern periphery of Del Valle limits, in Central Texas. COTA plays host to the Formula One United States Grand Prix. The circuit also hosts the Grand Prix of the Americas, a round of the Road Racing World Championship, commonly known as MotoGP and NASCAR's Texas Grand Prix. It previously hosted the Australian V8 Supercars series, the FIA World Endurance Championship, the American Le Mans Series, and the Rolex Sports Car Series in 2013 as well as the IMSA WeatherTech SportsCar Championship.

On September 12, 1998, two semifinals games of the 1998 USISL D-3 Pro League occurred at the Del Valle Stadium. The championship games were also held there. The 2019 San Antonio FC season held a match in Del Valle on March 30, 2019. Its 2019 U.S. Open Cup was held on May 29. The 2021 San Antonio FC season held two matches on July 31 and September 7, 2021, at Bold Stadium. The 2021 Austin Bold FC season held a game at Bold Stadium on September 7. On June 18, 2023, Garbage & Noel Gallagher's High Flying Birds: Live in Concert performed at GIA.

The rock band Kiss performed here on September 29, 2021, as part of their End of the Road World Tour.

=== Austin360 Amphitheater ===
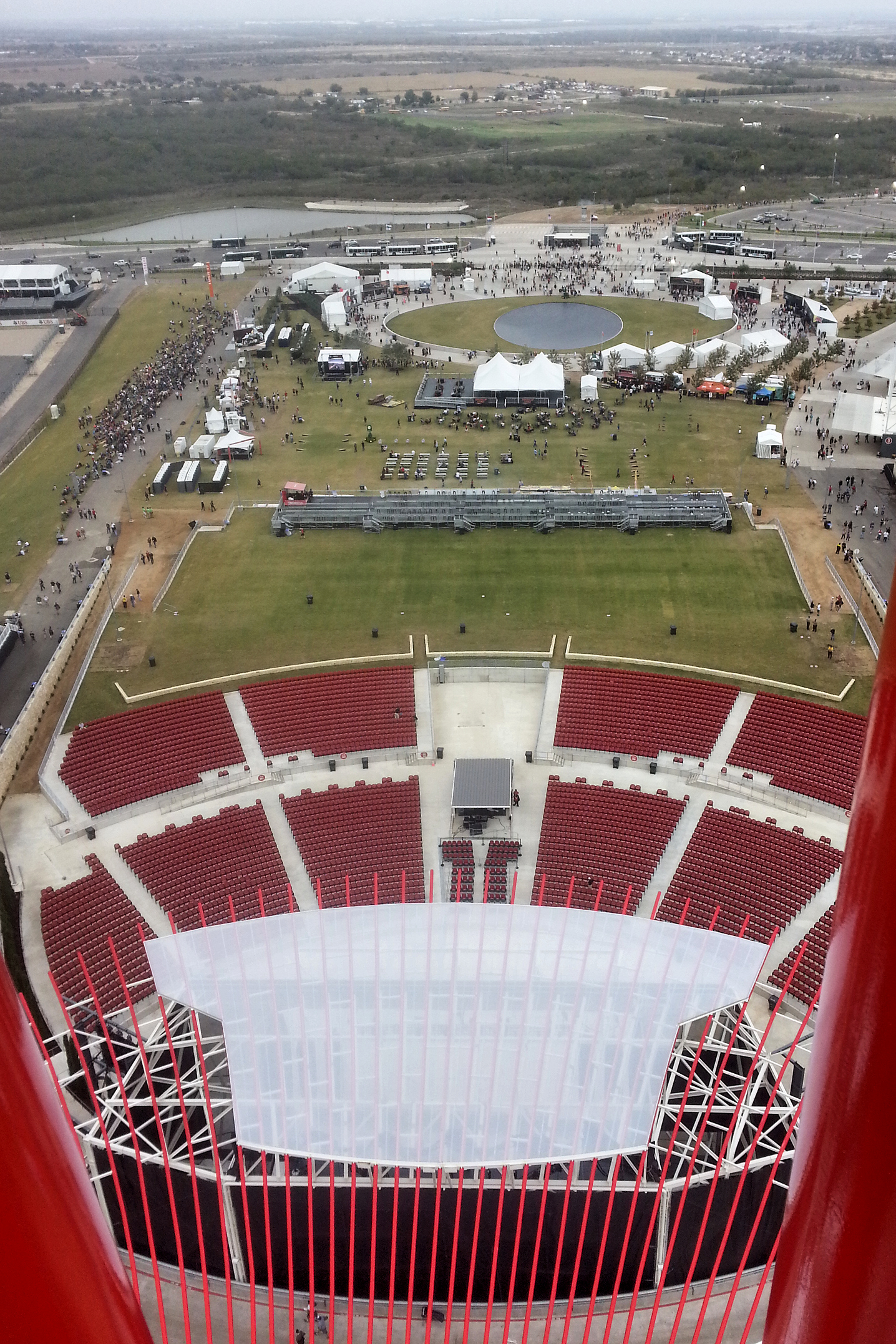
Austin360 Amphitheater

The Austin360 Amphitheater, winner of Pollstar’s “Best New Major Concert Venue” award for 2013, is an open-air amphitheater situated within Circuit of The Americas’ 1,500-acre sports and entertainment complex and has room for up to 14,000 guests. On July 23, 2016, alternative rock bands Brand New and Modest Mouse performed there.

=== Parks and recreation ===
- Southeast Metropolitan Park
- Barkley Meadows Park
- Richard Moya Park
- NLand Surf Park

=== Other ===
The Zoho Corporation, which makes computer software and web-based business tools, has an office in Del Valle. SMC Recordings is an independent hip hop record label that was established here. Wat Buddhananachat of Austin is a Buddhist temple located in Del Valle. Shackleton Energy Company was headquartered in the community. Inmate video visitation is used at the Travis County Correctional Complex in Del Valle. Stone Aerospace also has its headquarters in Del Valle.

=== Media ===
KZNX, a radio station, has a transmitter in the settlement's Thoroughbred Estates neighborhood. KIXL is a Catholic radio station that also has a transmitter in Del Valle. KVLR is the radio transmitter for 92.9 FM in Del Valle.

== Notable people ==
- Curtis Jerrells, basketball player for the Egyptian Basketball Super League, attended Del Valle High School
- Joel Kinnaman, Swedish actor, was a foreign exchange student in Del Valle.
- Priscilla Presley, wife of Elvis Presley, lived in Del Valle in 1956.
- Kevin Rollins, businessman and philanthropist had a residence in the community.

== See also ==
- King Ranch
- Starbase, Texas
- Leesville, Texas
