= Carl, Texas =

- Unincorporated community
- Location within Texas Location within the United States
- Coordinates: 30°06′51″N 97°44′59″W
- Country: United States
- State: Texas
- County: Travis
- Elevation: 659 ft (201 m)
- Time zone: UTC-6 (Central (CST))
  - Summer (DST): UTC-5 (CDT)
- Area codes: 512 & 737
- GNIS feature ID: 2034681

Carl is an unincorporated community in Travis County, in the U.S. state of Texas. It is located within the Greater Austin metropolitan area.

== Geography ==
Carl is located 12 mi (19 km) south of Austin and 2 mi (3.2 km) north of Creedmoor in southern Travis County.

== Education ==
Carl had its own school in the early 1890s and the 1940s. Today the community is served by the Del Valle Independent School District. Schools that serve the community are Creedmoor Elementary School, John P. Ojeda Junior High School, and Del Valle High School.
