= Webberville =

Webberville may refer to a location in the United States:

- Webberville, Michigan
- Webberville, Texas
