= Cedar Valley, Travis County, Texas =

- Unincorporated community
- Location within Texas Location within the United States
- Coordinates: 30°13′21″N 97°57′21″W
- Country: United States
- State: Texas
- County: Travis
- Elevation: 1,093 ft (333 m)
- Time zone: UTC-6 (Central (CST))
  - Summer (DST): UTC-5 (CDT)
- Area codes: 512 & 737
- GNIS feature ID: 1373030

Cedar Valley is an unincorporated community in Travis County, in the U.S. state of Texas. According to the Handbook of Texas, the community had a population of 70 in 2000. It is located within the Greater Austin metropolitan area.

== Geography ==
Cedar Valley is located on U.S. Highway 290, 12 mi (19 km) southwest of Austin in southwestern Travis County.

== Education ==
Today the community is served by the Austin Independent School District. Schools that serve the community are Baldwin Elementary School, Small Middle School, and Bowie High School.
