= Bluff Springs, Texas =

Bluff Springs
- Unincorporated community
- Location within Travis County
- Location within the state of Texas Bluff Springs (the United States)
- Coordinates: 30°09′28″N 97°46′08″W
- Country: United States
- State: Texas
- County: Travis
- Elevation: 577 ft (176 m)
- Time zone: UTC-6 (Central (CST))
  - Summer (DST): UTC-5 (CDT)

Bluff Springs is a small unincorporated community in southern Travis County, Texas, United States. According to the Handbook of Texas, the community had a population of 50 in 2000. It is located within the Greater Austin metropolitan area.

== History ==
Bluff Springs was first settled in the early 1850s. A post office was established at Bluff Springs in 1853 and remained in operation until 1902, with William S. Smith serving as postmaster. Mail was then sent from Buda. In the mid-1880s, the settlement had several steam-powered gristmills, cotton gins, and a church serving 250 residents. Stagecoach operations from the community expanded toward Lockhart, Luling, and Austin. Farmers in the area grew cotton, corn, oats, and sweet potatoes. In 1892, the population plunged to 50. It fell by half in the early 1930s but returned to 50 in 1939 and remained there through 2000. Bluff Springs only had a church, a few businesses, and scattered houses in the 1940s.

Bluff Springs is located on the Thomas F. McKinney land grant.

== Geography ==
Bluff Springs is located on Onion Creek, 8 mi (13 km) south of Austin and two miles east of Interstate 35 in southern Travis County.

== Education ==
Bluff Springs had its own school in the mid-1880s. Today, the community is served by the Austin Independent School District. Schools that are zoned for the community are Blazier Elementary School, Paredes Middle School, and Akins High School.
