= Turnersville, Travis County, Texas =

- Unincorporated community
- Location within Texas Location within the United States
- Coordinates: 30°5′34″N 97°46′52″W
- Country: United States
- State: Texas
- County: Travis
- Elevation: 728 ft (222 m)
- Time zone: UTC-6 (Central (CST))
  - Summer (DST): UTC-5 (CDT)
- Area codes: 512 & 737
- GNIS feature ID: 1379183

Turnersville is an unincorporated community in Travis County, in the U.S. state of Texas. According to the Handbook of Texas, the community had a population of 90 in 2000. It is located within the Greater Austin metropolitan area.

== History ==
J. L. Turner, an early settler, is the name of the town that bears his name. In the middle of the 1930s, the village had fifty residents; by the late 1940s, it was identified on county highway maps by a few small shops and dispersed homes. From the late 1940s to 2000, Turnersville's population was listed at 90.

== Geography ==
Turnersville is located near Interstate 35, 12 mi (19 km) south of Austin in southern Travis County.

== Education ==
J. L. Turner donated land for a school here in 1880. In 1950, the Hays Consolidated Independent School District and the Turnersville Common School District merged. Schools that serve the community today are Camino Real Elementary School, Dr. T.C. McCormick Jr. Middle School, and Moe and Gene Johnson High School.
