= Rollingwood, Texas =

- City
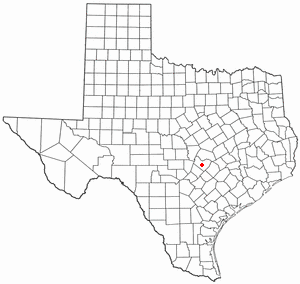
- Location of Rollingwood, Texas
- Coordinates: 30°16′25″N 97°47′13″W
- Country: United States
- State: Texas
- County: Travis
- Incorporated: 1963

Government
  - Type: City Council
  - Mayor: Gavin Massingill

Area
  - Total: 0.70 sq mi (1.81 km^{2})
  - Land: 0.70 sq mi (1.81 km^{2})
  - Water: 0 sq mi (0.00 km^{2})
- Elevation: 627 ft (191 m)

Population (2020)
  - Total: 1,467
  - Density: 2,271.0/sq mi (876.82/km^{2})
- Time zone: UTC-6 (Central (CST))
  - Summer (DST): UTC-5 (CDT)
- ZIP code: 78746
- Area code: 512
- FIPS code: 48-63008
- GNIS feature ID: 2410988
- Website: https://rollingwoodtx.gov/

Rollingwood is a city in Travis County, Texas, United States. Part of the Austin–Round Rock metropolitan area, the population was 1,467 at the 2020 census.

== Geography ==
Rollingwood is located three miles (5 km) west of downtown Austin.

According to the United States Census Bureau, the city has a total area of 0.7 square mile (1.8 km^{2}), all land.

== Demographics ==
Historical population
Census	Pop.	Note	%±
1960	390		—
1970	780		100.0%
1980	1,027		31.7%
1990	1,388		35.2%
2000	1,403		1.1%
2010	1,412		0.6%
2020	1,467		3.9%
U.S. Decennial Census

=== 2020 census ===
As of the 2020 census, Rollingwood had a population of 1,467. The median age was 42.2 years; 34.4% of residents were under the age of 18 and 17.1% of residents were 65 years of age or older. For every 100 females there were 102.1 males, and for every 100 females age 18 and over there were 96.1 males age 18 and over.

100.0% of residents lived in urban areas, while 0.0% lived in rural areas.

There were 479 households in Rollingwood, of which 50.9% had children under the age of 18 living in them. Of all households, 75.8% were married-couple households, 6.9% were households with a male householder and no spouse or partner present, and 14.0% were households with a female householder and no spouse or partner present. About 10.0% of all households were made up of individuals and 5.2% had someone living alone who was 65 years of age or older.

There were 515 housing units, of which 7.0% were vacant. The homeowner vacancy rate was 1.5% and the rental vacancy rate was 5.3%.

Racial composition as of the 2020 census
Race	Number	Percent
White	1,209	82.4%
Black or African American	2	0.1%
American Indian and Alaska Native	3	0.2%
Asian	68	4.6%
Native Hawaiian and Other Pacific Islander	0	0.0%
Some other race	12	0.8%
Two or more races	173	11.8%
Hispanic or Latino (of any race)	143	9.7%

=== 2000 census ===
At the 2000 census there were 1,403 people in 489 households, including 413 families, in the city. The population density was 2,070.7 inhabitants per square mile (799.5/km^{2}). There were 498 housing units at an average density of 735.0 per square mile (283.8/km^{2}). The racial makeup of the city was 96.01% White, 0.21% Native American, 2.28% Asian, 0.50% from other races, and 1.00% from two or more races. Hispanic or Latino of any race were 4.92%.

Of the 489 households 45.2% had children under the age of 18 living with them, 74.8% were married couples living together, 7.6% had a female householder with no husband present, and 15.5% were non-families. 12.9% of households were one person and 6.1% were one person aged 65 or older. The average household size was 2.87 and the average family size was 3.15.

The age distribution was 29.8% under the age of 18, 4.6% from 18 to 24, 21.7% from 25 to 44, 32.4% from 45 to 64, and 11.4% 65 or older. The median age was 42 years. For every 100 females, there were 98.7 males. For every 100 females age 18 and over, there were 90.5 males.

The median household income was $108,835 and the median family income was $117,851. Males had a median income of $86,197 versus $43,125 for females. The per capita income for the city was $52,280. About 0.5% of families and 0.5% of the population were below the poverty line, including 0.5% of those under age 18 and none of those age 65 or over.
