= Travis County, Texas =

County in Texas, US

- County
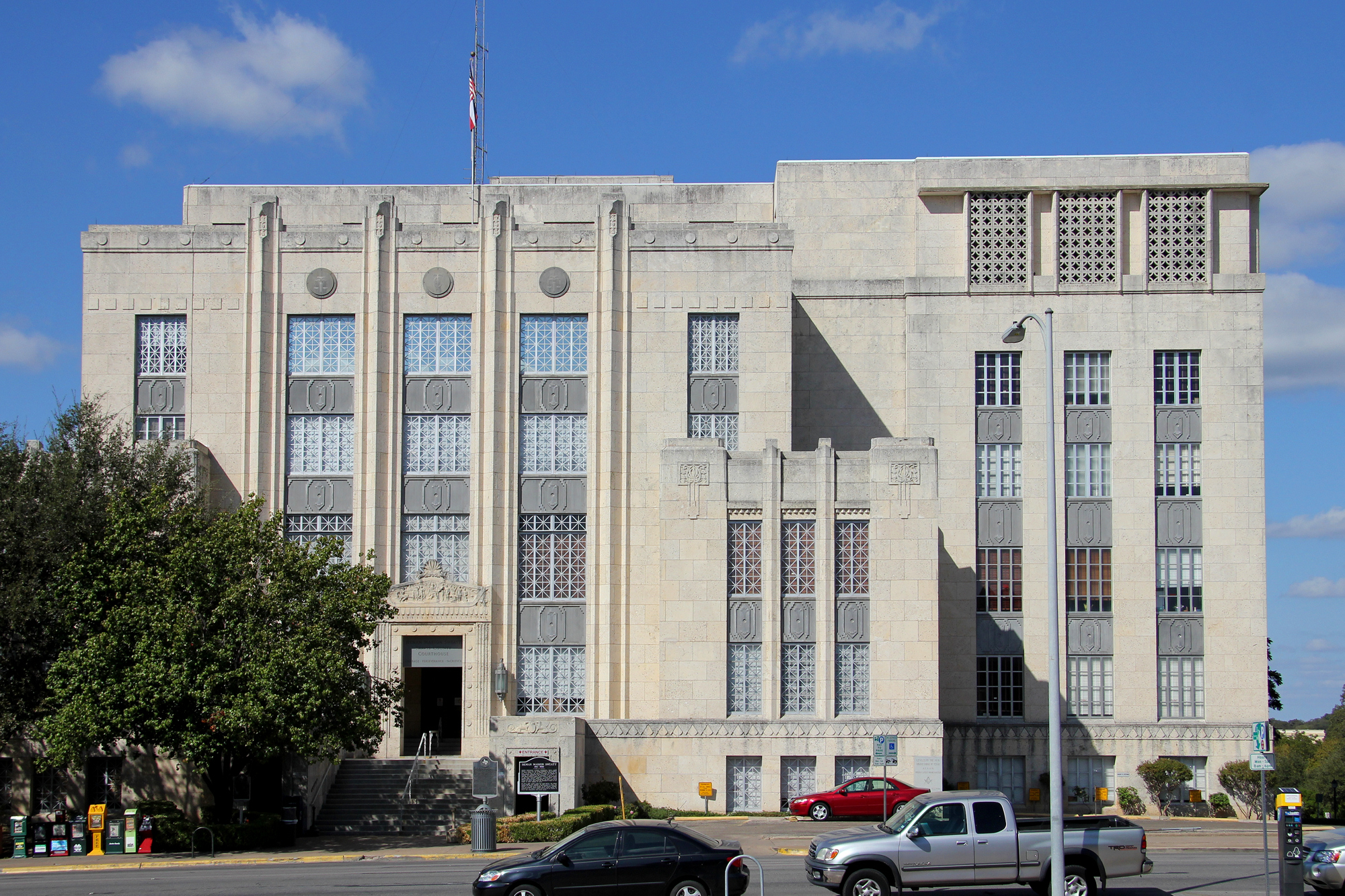
- Heman Marion Sweatt Travis County Courthouse in Austin

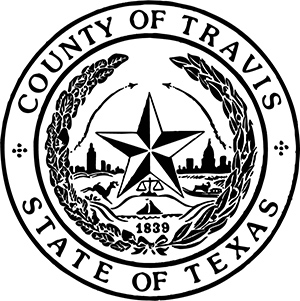
- Flag Seal Logo

- Location within the U.S. state of Texas
- Coordinates: 30°20′N 97°47′W
- Country: United States
- State: Texas
- Founded: 1840
- Named for: William B. Travis
- Seat: Austin
- Largest city: Austin

Area
  - Total: 1,023 sq mi (2,650 km^{2})
  - Land: 990 sq mi (2,600 km^{2})
  - Water: 33 sq mi (85 km^{2}) 3.2%

Population (2020)
  - Total: 1,290,188
  - Estimate (2025): 1,389,670 ▲
  - Density: 1,300/sq mi (500/km^{2})

GDP
  - Total: $202.653 billion (2024)
- Time zone: UTC−6 (Central)
  - Summer (DST): UTC−5 (CDT)
- Congressional districts: 10th, 17th, 21st, 35th, 37th
- Website: www.traviscountytx.gov

Travis County is located in Central Texas. As of the 2020 census, the population was 1,290,188. It is the fifth-most populous county in Texas. Its county seat and most populous city is Austin, the state's capital. The county was established in 1840 and is named in honor of William Barret Travis, the commander of the Republic of Texas forces at the Battle of the Alamo. Travis County is part of the Austin–Round Rock–Georgetown metropolitan area. It is located along the Balcones Fault, the boundary between the Edwards Plateau to the west and the Blackland Prairie to the east.

== History ==
=== Prehistoric Texas ===
Early inhabitants of Central Texas date to between 12,000 to 22,000 years ago as evidenced by the discovery of sites like Leanderthal Lady ("Leanne") at the Wilson-Leonard site near Leander, Texas.

Another two of the oldest Paleo-Indian archeological sites in Texas, the Levi Rock Shelter and Smith Rock Shelter, are in southwest and southeast Travis County, respectively.

In downtown Austin, archeological excavations have revealed that the hilltop where the French Legation now sits was utilized during the Archaic period (North America), possibly 5,000 years ago. Even earlier artifacts dating to the Paleo-Indians period show that humans may have used the area as early as 9,000 years ago.

Continuous occupation of Travis County continues into the Toyah Phase represented by sites like the Toyah Bluff Site in southeast Travis County along Onion Creek. The Toyah Phase is the last widespread prehistoric pattern prior to the arrival of Europeans.

=== Spanish period ===
The region (along with all of modern Texas) was claimed by the Spanish Empire in the 1600s, but at the time no attempt was made to settle the area (or even to explore it fully).

In 1691 Domingo Terán de los Ríos was instructed to make a tour of Spanish Texas with the goal of establishing missions among the Tejas (Hasinai), keep records of "geography, natives, and products" and investigate rumors of foreign settlements on the coast (the French). Terán's entrada took them through Travis County crossing the Colorado River near what would later be called the Montopolis ford, which today is part of El Camino Real de los Tejas National Historic Trail.

In 1709 Captain Pedro de Aguirre led an expedition with Fathers Antonio de Olivares and Isidro de Espinosa (Espinosa-Olivares-Aguirre Expedition) from San Juan Bautista Mission along the Rio Grande River in Mexico into Travis County hoping to meet with the Tejas Indians (Hasinai). They reached the south bank the Colorado River in or near Austin in April, but found the Tejas were not there. They were however visited by members of a number of Indigenous Peoples: Yojuan (AKA Yojuane), Simomo, and Tusonibi. Guides for the Spanish included Indigenous Peoples they had encountered just previously living near San Pedro Springs: Chaularame, Payaya, Sana, Sijame, and Siupan. With orders not to cross the Colorado the expedition returned to Mexico.

In 1730 Franciscan friars, who were given responsibility for all the Texas missions, made the decision to relocate three missions, La Purísima Concepción, San Francisco de los Neches, and San José de los Nazonis, to a site by the Colorado River near Barton Springs. The friars found conditions undesirable and relocated to the San Antonio River within a year of their arrival.

El Camino Real de los Tejas National Historic Trail runs through Travis County crossing the Colorado River just east of the Montopolis Bridge.

=== Mexican period ===
In 1821 Mexico won its independence from Spain, and the new government enacted laws encouraging colonists to settle the Texas frontier by granting them land and reduced taxation. Over the next decade, thousands of foreign immigrants (primarily from the United States) moved into Texas; in particular, American empresario Stephen F. Austin established one of his colonies, known as Austin's "Little Colony", consisting of 100 families near what is now Bastrop, Texas in 1827. Josiah and Mathias Wilbarger, Reuben Hornsby (namesake of Hornsby Bend, Travis County, Texas), Jacob M. Harrell, Noah Smithwick, and John F. Webber (namesake of Webberville, Travis County, Texas) were early settlers who moved to the Bastrop area in the early 1830s. Webber and Reubon Hornsby would later move west and form the settlements of Webberville and Hornsby Bend respectively.

=== Republic of Texas period ===
In 1836 Texas declared and won its independence from Mexico, forming the Republic of Texas. That same year, 1836, before Austin was founded, Fort Colorado, AKA Fort Coleman, was established in then Bastrop County, later to be Travis County, to secure and expand the Republic of Texas’ control over Native American territory. It was strategically located on the main road to what would later be Austin from Bastrop, Texas, Webberville, Texas and Hornsby Bend, Texas, what Barkley called the "Path of the Pioneers", today's Webberville Road, also known as FM 969. It was this path Vice President Lamar would later take to Waterloo in 1838 for the buffalo hunt which eventually led to Austin as the capital of Texas. Lamar stopped at the fort to procure an escort of rangers. Fort Colorado was also strategically placed near a trade route utilized by Native Americans since prehistory that the Spanish would later adopt, El Camino Real de los Tejas National Historic Trail. The site of Fort Colorado is located on today's Travis Audubon Blair Woods Preserve and is a part of the historic trail.

While there were skirmishes between Anglo-Texans and Native Americans, there were also attempts at peace. In 1837 a band of Penateka Comanche (Nʉmʉnʉʉ) approached Fort Colorado to seek a treaty of peace. Texas Ranger and historian Noah Smithwick, stationed at the fort, lived with the Comanche as emissary for many months where he “was made the recipient of every attention known to their code of hospitality”. This is the only known peace treaty initiated from inside Travis County. The treaty was unfortunately never ratified by Texas.

Historically recorded tribes in Travis County at this time were Comanche, Lipan Apache, Tonkawa, Waco (a branch of the Wichita), and others. Tribes such as the ethnographically well-known Comanche, Lipan Apache, Waco (Wichita branch), and even the Tonkawa migrated into Texas, of which Travis County is a part, just before or during the early European contact period. The expansion of the Spanish into what is now Travis County, establishing missions, traveling El Camino Real de los Tejas, and introducing European diseases, along with the migration of other Native American tribes to the area, particularly the Lipan Apache who in turn were retreating from Comanche expansion, displaced tribes that were indigenous to the area since before European contact, like the Coahuiltecans.

After Texas Vice President Mirabeau B. Lamar visited central Texas during a buffalo-hunting expedition between 1837 and 1838, he proposed that the republic's capital (then located in Houston) be relocated to a site on the north bank of the Colorado River. Edward Burleson had surveyed the planned townsite of Waterloo, near the mouth of Shoal Creek on the Colorado River, in 1838; it was incorporated January 1839. By April of that year the site selection commission had selected Waterloo to be the new capital. A bill previously passed by Congress in May, 1838, specified that any site selected as the new capital would be named Austin, after the late Stephen F. Austin; hence Waterloo upon selection as the capital was renamed Austin.

A new county was also established the following year, of which Austin would be the seat; the county was named Travis County, after William B. Travis, commander of the Alamo. Travis County was originally a part of Bastrop County; many old land records from the time of Mexican Texas for Travis County were originally filed with the Bastrop County Clerk's Office. Later a number of other counties were carved from the original boundaries of Travis County: Callahan (1858), Coleman (1858), Comal (1846), Gillespie (1848), Hays (1848), Burnet (1852), Brown (1856), Lampasas (1856), Eastland (1858), Runnels (1858), and Taylor (1858).

In the years following the battle of San Jacinto in 1836, Mexican leaders periodically threatened to renew hostilities against Texas. March 5, 1842, at the direction of Antonio López de Santa Anna, a force of 700 men under Ráfael Vásquez (general) marched into Texas and seized San Antonio. Forewarned of the Mexican advance, most residents had already evacuated allowing Vasquez to enter the town unopposed. Fearing a subsequent attack on Austin (which never came), many residents left Austin and President Houston moved the capital to Houston on March 13, 1842; it was then moved to Washington-on-the-Brazos, Texas September of that same year. It was during this period the Texas Archive War took place. The capital was moved once more, back to Austin, in 1845.

=== Civil War and Reconstruction ===
In 1861 Travis County was one of the few Texas counties to vote against secession from the Union. Since the majority of the state did favor secession, Travis County then became a part of the Confederacy for the duration of the Civil War.

After secession, life became difficult for those in Travis County that continued to support the Union. Governor Sam Houston refused to take the oath of loyalty to the Confederate States of America and was forced to step-down as Governor. Some, like prominent lawyer and businessman, Josiah Fisk, namesake of Fiskville and brother of Greenleaf Fisk, opted to leave Texas when threatened with conscription. Others like former Texas Ranger Richard Lincoln Preece mounted guerilla resistance against the Confederacy from inside Travis County, eventually being forced to leave Texas via Mexico to join the U.S. Army. Barkley describes hangings and attempted hangings in Travis County of persons remaining loyal to the Union.

During the Civil War a number of forts, or fortifications, were built in Austin anticipating Union attack (which never occurred). One of the better documented of these located on South Congress was Fort Magruder.

Among shortages experienced in Travis County during the Civil War was timely news from newspapers. Some newspapermen closed shop and enlisted when the war began. Other newspapers were forced to close due to lack of ink and paper available only through Mexico or the Gulf Coast which was blockaded by Union forces. In Travis County the "State Gazette" (Austin) kept a pony express rider at the Brenham, Texas railhead to bring in Houston papers with news only 18 hours old.

During the Civil War, the Tonkawa massacre of 1862 took place on a reservation in Indian Territory (modern-day Oklahoma). It was an attack by a number of pro-Union Native American tribes on the Tonkawa who supported the Confederacy; the massacre led to near extermination of the tribe. After the massacre, by the summer of 1863, some Tonkawa began drifting south into Texas, some returning to the Austin area, then a fortified Confederate city. At the end of the Civil War, Austin was surrendered to the United States and occupied by Union troops. By 1867 the United States ordered the removal of the Tonkawa from Austin. The Indian Papers document the escorted removal of 135 Tonkawa from Austin to Jacksboro, Texas, March 3, 1867 to April 18, 1867, for eventual resettlement on a reservation near Fort Griffin in Shackelford County, Texas that same year.

Following the end of the Civil War Texas opened two facilities in Austin, one intended to care for disabled and indigent Confederate Veterans (men), opened in 1884, and a Confederate women's home for wives and widows of Confederate Veterans opened in 1908. In addition, Texas opened the Confederate section of the Texas State Cemetery to accommodate the burial of both Veterans, and wives and widows of Veterans.

Reconstruction began with the end of the Civil War lasting from 1865 to 1870. As the capital of Texas, Austin played a central role in administration of Reconstruction policies and programs. U.S. Army troops were stationed in Austin to enforce new laws and protect African Americans.

The Bureau of Refugees, Freedmen, and Abandoned Lands, better known as The Freedmen’s Bureau, was administered from Austin helping formerly enslaved people with labor contracts, education, and legal disputes.

During Reconstruction Travis County saw the formation of many Freedom colonies by enslaved African Americans.

After Reconstruction the first Railroad to enter Travis County was the Houston and Texas Central Railway arriving in Austin December 25, 1871, making the city the westernmost rail terminus in Texas. With the arrival of the railroad materials like milled lumber became readily available ushering in a building boom and making Austin a trading center. A second railroad soon followed, the International–Great Northern, reaching Austin in 1876. Several lumberyards appear on the 1887 Birdseye Map of Austin near the rail freight yard.

=== 20th century ===
The United States Geological Survey (USGS) was established in 1879. In the early years of the USGS its survey work was hampered by lack of funds and as late as the 1920s nearly 60% of the US was still unmapped. Travis County was fortunate to be one of the first areas mapped producing what is known as the "1902 Austin folio" (surveyed 1895-1896, published 1902). Although referred to as the "Austin quadrangle" it covers all of Travis County. In addition to the map produced, the USGS produced written reports including the "culture" of Travis County at the turn of the 20th century.

Quoting the USGS: "The Austin quadrangle has a comparatively dense population, but nine-tenths of its inhabitants are found on the Coastal Plain, east of the Balcones scarp, the Edwards Plateau country to the west being but sparsely populated. The densest rural population is found in the White Rock and Taylor prairies and the Colorado bottoms, nearly the entire areas of which are devoted to the cultivation of cotton, with some minor crops. The few people inhabiting the Edwards Plateau are engaged in raising cattle and cutting cedar timber from the hills to supply the city of Austin with fuel. Occasionally farmers cultivate small areas of alluvial soil in the valleys of this district."

Towns cited: "Austin, the capital of the State, occupies both banks of the Colorado near the center of the quadrangle. It is a city of 30,000 inhabitants and contains many handsome public buildings, including the capitol and university. Manor, about 12 miles northeast of Austin, is a prosperous rural village of about 5000 inhabitants. McNeil, Manchaca, and Buda are small towns along the line of the International and Great Northern Railroad. The other towns on the map, such as Oak Hill, Watters, Pflugerville, Sprinkle, Bluff Springs, New Sweden, and Fiskville, are small villages with one or more stores and a few houses."

Railroads: International and Great Northern Railroad; Houston and Texas Central Railway; Austin and Northwestern Railroad branch of the Houston and Texas Central Railway.

Roads of the time are categorized as "county roads of the first order, which lead from Austin to the neighboring county seats; lanes leading from the main highways to small communities or farms; and country roads, originally made by wood cutters, which meander through the region of the Edwards Plateau ... Three substantial bridges span the Colorado, the westernmost of which is devoted solely to railway traffic, and the others, at Austin and Montopolis, Austin, Texas, to vehicles."

The USGS descriptions concludes with a note that applies to Travis County to this day: "It is interesting to note on the map how the courses of the principal railways and highways are governed by the geologic structure."

1936 was the Centennial of Texas' independence from Mexico. In celebration the Texas Legislature created the Commission of Control for Texas Centennial Celebrations. Of about 600 historical markers erected statewide Travis County received about 50 of the 1936 Centennial markers. Unfortunately most Centennial markers, being a product of their time, focus on the "Anglo Texan" view of the last 100 years overlooking the diverse experiences of Native Americans, African Americans, and Mexican Americans in Texas.

In addition to markers, Travis County celebrated the Centennial by publishing The Defender 1936, a yearbook of Travis County rural public schools, compiled by the students and staff of the schools represented in the book. The Defender is a valuable primary source for genealogists, researchers, educators and students of Travis County history. The 348-page book contains hundreds of names of students, teachers, principals, trustees, etc. There is history of each school and photos of people and school buildings. Having been out of print since 1936, copies of The Defender 1936 are hard to access. Fortunately the book has been scanned and published on-line through the University of North Texas’ Portal to Texas History. The Defender 1936 unfortunately does not include the many African American and Mexican American schools that were in Travis County at that time. The Travis County Engineering Department did however produce road maps in 1932 with names and locations of all these schools.

From the end of the Civil War to the early twenty-first century, Travis County has experienced steady, rapid population growth (averaging more than a 36% increase every decade from 1870 to 2010), driven largely by the growth of Austin and its suburbs; it is now the fifth most populous county in Texas, after Harris (Houston), Dallas, Tarrant (Fort Worth) and Bexar (San Antonio) counties.

== Geography ==
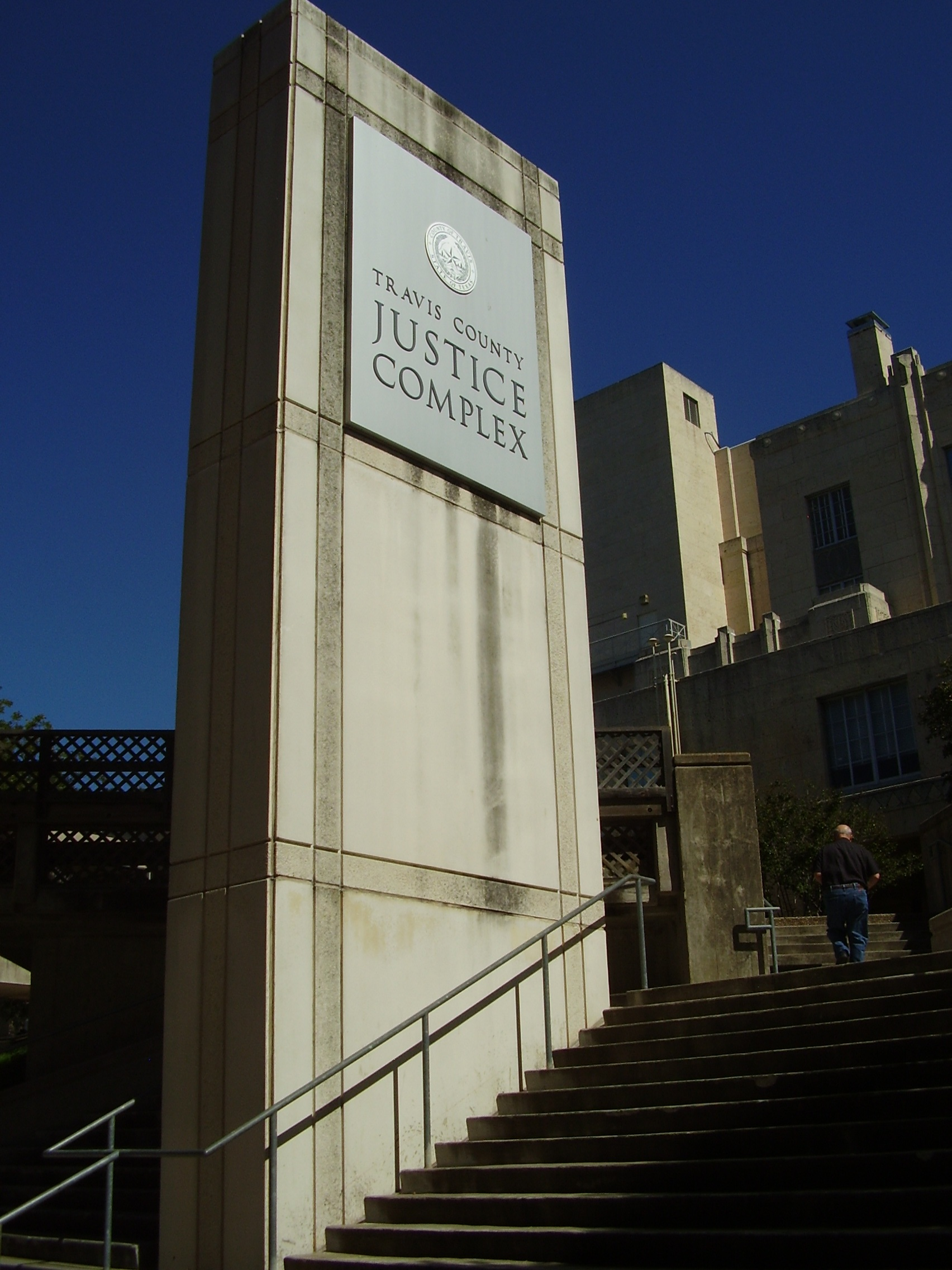
Travis County Justice Complex

According to the U.S. Census Bureau, the county has a total area of 1,023 square miles (2,650 km^{2}), of which 990 square miles (2,600 km^{2}) is land and 33 square miles (85 km^{2}) (3.2% of the territory) is water. Travis County is located in the southern part of central Texas, between San Antonio and Dallas–Fort Worth. The county's geographical center lies two miles northwest of downtown Austin at 30°18' north latitude and 97°45' west longitude.

Travis County straddles the Balcones Fault, the boundary between the Edwards Plateau to the west and the Texas Coastal Plain to the east. The western part of the county is characterized by the karst topography of the Texas Hill Country, while the eastern part exhibits the fertile plains and farmlands of the Blackland Prairie. The Colorado River meanders through the county from west to east, forming a series of man-made lakes (Lake Travis, Lake Austin, and Lady Bird Lake).

=== Springs ===
The limestone karst geology of the western and southwestern parts of Travis County gives rise to numerous caverns and springs, some of which have provided shelter and water for humans in the region for thousands of years. Notable springs in the county include Barton Springs, Deep Eddy and Hamilton Pool.

=== Adjacent counties ===
- Williamson County (north)
- Bastrop County (southeast)
- Caldwell County (south)
- Hays County (southwest)
- Blanco County (west)
- Burnet County (northwest)

=== Protected areas ===
- Balcones Canyonlands National Wildlife Refuge (part)

== Demographics ==
Historical population
Census	Pop.	Note	%±
1850	3,138		—
1860	8,080		157.5%
1870	13,153		62.8%
1880	27,028		105.5%
1890	36,322		34.4%
1900	47,386		30.5%
1910	55,620		17.4%
1920	57,616		3.6%
1930	77,777		35.0%
1940	111,053		42.8%
1950	160,980		45.0%
1960	212,136		31.8%
1970	295,516		39.3%
1980	419,573		42.0%
1990	576,407		37.4%
2000	812,280		40.9%
2010	1,024,266		26.1%
2020	1,290,188		26.0%
2025 (est.)	1,389,670	▲	7.7%
U.S. Decennial Census; 1850–2010 2010–2020

=== 2020 census ===
As of the 2020 census, the county had a population of 1,290,188, with a median age of 33.9 years; 21.2% of residents were under the age of 18 and 10.3% of residents were 65 years of age or older. For every 100 females there were 101.5 males, and for every 100 females age 18 and over there were 100.6 males age 18 and over.

The racial makeup of the county was 55.0% White, 7.8% Black or African American, 1.0% American Indian and Alaska Native, 7.8% Asian, 0.1% Native Hawaiian and Pacific Islander, 12.0% from some other race, and 16.3% from two or more races. Hispanic or Latino residents of any race comprised 32.6% of the population.

94.9% of residents lived in urban areas, while 5.1% lived in rural areas.

There were 520,981 households in the county, of which 28.4% had children under the age of 18 living in them. Of all households, 40.4% were married-couple households, 23.8% were households with a male householder and no spouse or partner present, and 27.0% were households with a female householder and no spouse or partner present. About 31.4% of all households were made up of individuals and 6.2% had someone living alone who was 65 years of age or older.

There were 562,488 housing units, of which 7.4% were vacant. Among occupied housing units, 49.6% were owner-occupied and 50.4% were renter-occupied. The homeowner vacancy rate was 1.3% and the rental vacancy rate was 7.8%.

=== American Community Survey 2025 data ===
The United States Census Bureau estimated that in 2025, Travis County’s population was 1.389.670. It was also estimated that the county's population was 44,62% Non-Hispanic White, 33,90% Hispanic or Latino, 7,94% Non-Hispanic Black, 9,91% Asian, 0,21% Native American, 0,07% Pacific Islander, and 3,36% Multiracial.

Total	Population	Percentage
Non-Hispanic White	620.038	44,62%
Hispanic or Latino	471.034	33,90%
Non-Hispanic Black	110.347	7,94%
Asian	137.648	9,91%
Native American	2.910	0,21%
Pacific Islander	993	0,07%
Non-Hispanic Multiracial	46.700	3,36%

=== Racial and ethnic composition ===
Travis County, Texas – Racial and ethnic composition Note: the US Census treats Hispanic/Latino as an ethnic category. This table excludes Latinos from the racial categories and assigns them to a separate category. Hispanics/Latinos may be of any race.
Race / Ethnicity (NH = Non-Hispanic)	Pop 1980	Pop 1990	Pop 2000	Pop 2010	Pop 2020	% 1980	% 1990	% 2000	% 2010	% 2020
White alone (NH)	295,049	375,279	457,817	517,644	612,824	70.32%	65.11%	56.36%	50.54%	47.50%
Black or African American alone (NH)	44,422	60,998	73,242	82,805	96,270	10.59%	10.58%	9.02%	8.08%	7.46%
Native American or Alaska Native alone (NH)	1,241	1,562	2,261	2,611	2,762	0.30%	0.27%	0.28%	0.25%	0.21%
Asian alone (NH)	4,105	15,883	35,842	58,404	99,660	0.98%	2.76%	4.41%	5.70%	7.72%
Native Hawaiian or Pacific Islander alone (NH)	x	x	390	540	774	x	x	0.05%	0.05%	0.06%
Other race alone (NH)	2,468	996	1,429	1,813	6,513	0.59%	0.17%	0.18%	0.18%	0.50%
Mixed race or Multiracial (NH)	x	x	12,251	17,683	50,275	x	x	1.51%	1.73%	3.90%
Hispanic or Latino (any race)	72,288	121,689	229,048	342,766	421,110	17.23%	21.11%	28.20%	33.46%	32.64%
Total	419,573	576,407	812,280	1,024,266	1,290,188	100.00%	100.00%	100.00%	100.00%	100.00%

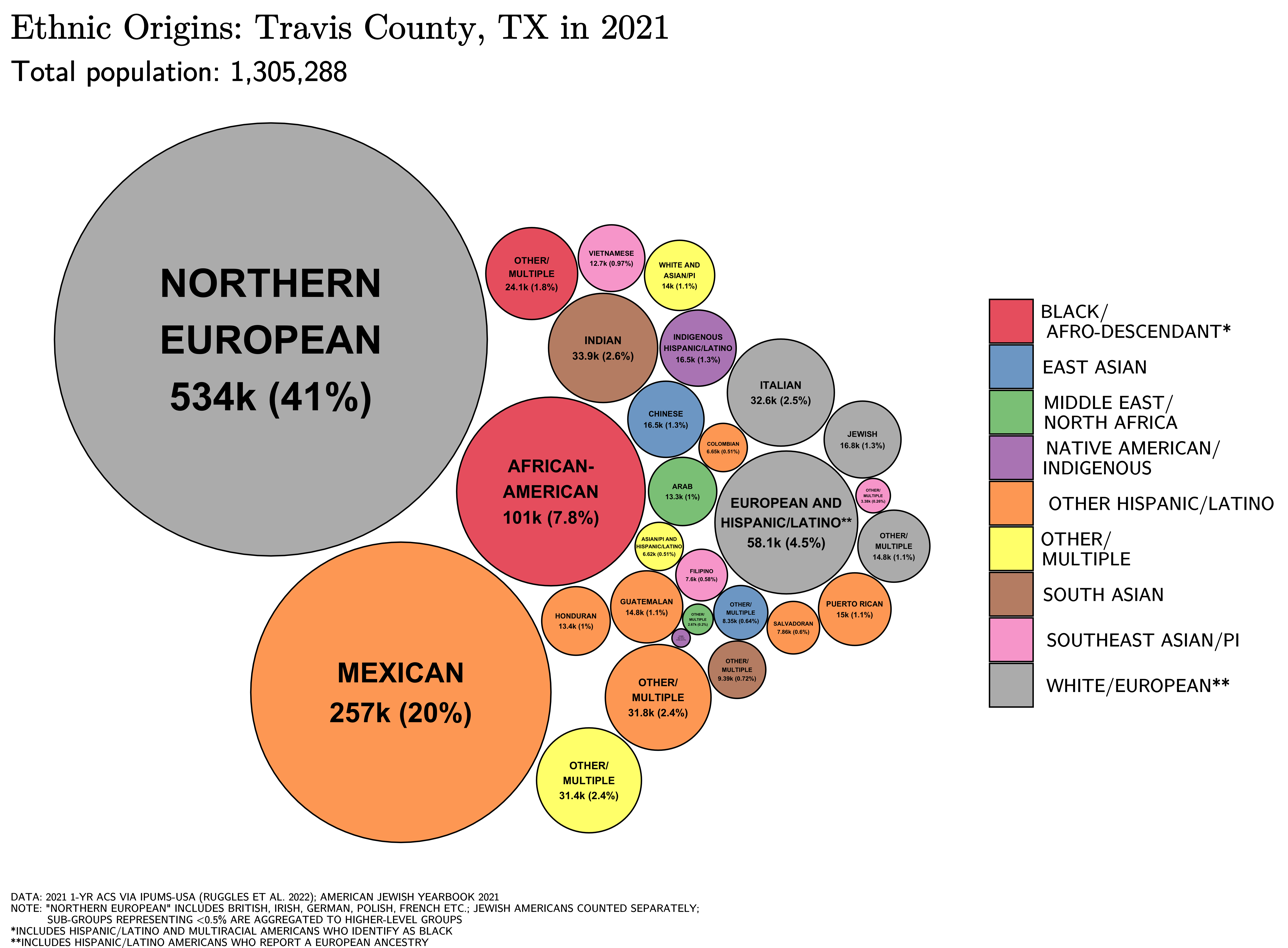
Ethnic origins in Travis County

=== 2010 census ===
According to the census of 2010, there were 1,024,266 people, 320,766 households, and 183,798 families residing in the county. The population density was 1,034 persons per square mile (399 persons/km^{2}). There were 335,881 housing units at an average density of 340 units per square mile (130 units/km^{2}). The racial makeup of the county was 68.21% White, 9.26% Black or African American, 0.58% Native American, 4.47% Asian, 0.07% Pacific Islander, 14.56% other races, and 2.85% from two or more races. 28.20% of the population were Hispanic or Latino of any race. English is the sole language spoken at home by 71.42% of the population age 5 or over, while 22.35% speak Spanish, and a Chinese language (including Mandarin, Taiwanese, and Cantonese) is spoken by 1.05%. As of the 2010 census, there were about 11.1 same-sex couples per 1,000 households in the county.

=== 2000 census ===
According to the census of 2000, there were 812,280 people, of which 29.30% had children under the age of 18 living with them, 42.60% were married couples living together, 10.40% had a female householder with no husband present, and 42.70% were non-families. 30.10% of all households were composed of individuals, and 4.40% had someone living alone who was 65 or older. The average household size was 2.47 and the average family size was 3.15. 12.0% were of German, 7.7% English, 6.6% Irish and 5.5% American ancestry according to Census 2000

The population's age distribution was 23.80% under the age of 18, 14.70% from 18 to 24, 36.50% from 25 to 44, 18.20% from 45 to 64, and 6.70% age 65 years of age or older. The median age was 30 years. For every 100 females, there were 104.90 males. For every 100 females age 18 and over, there were 104.50 males.

== Government and politics ==
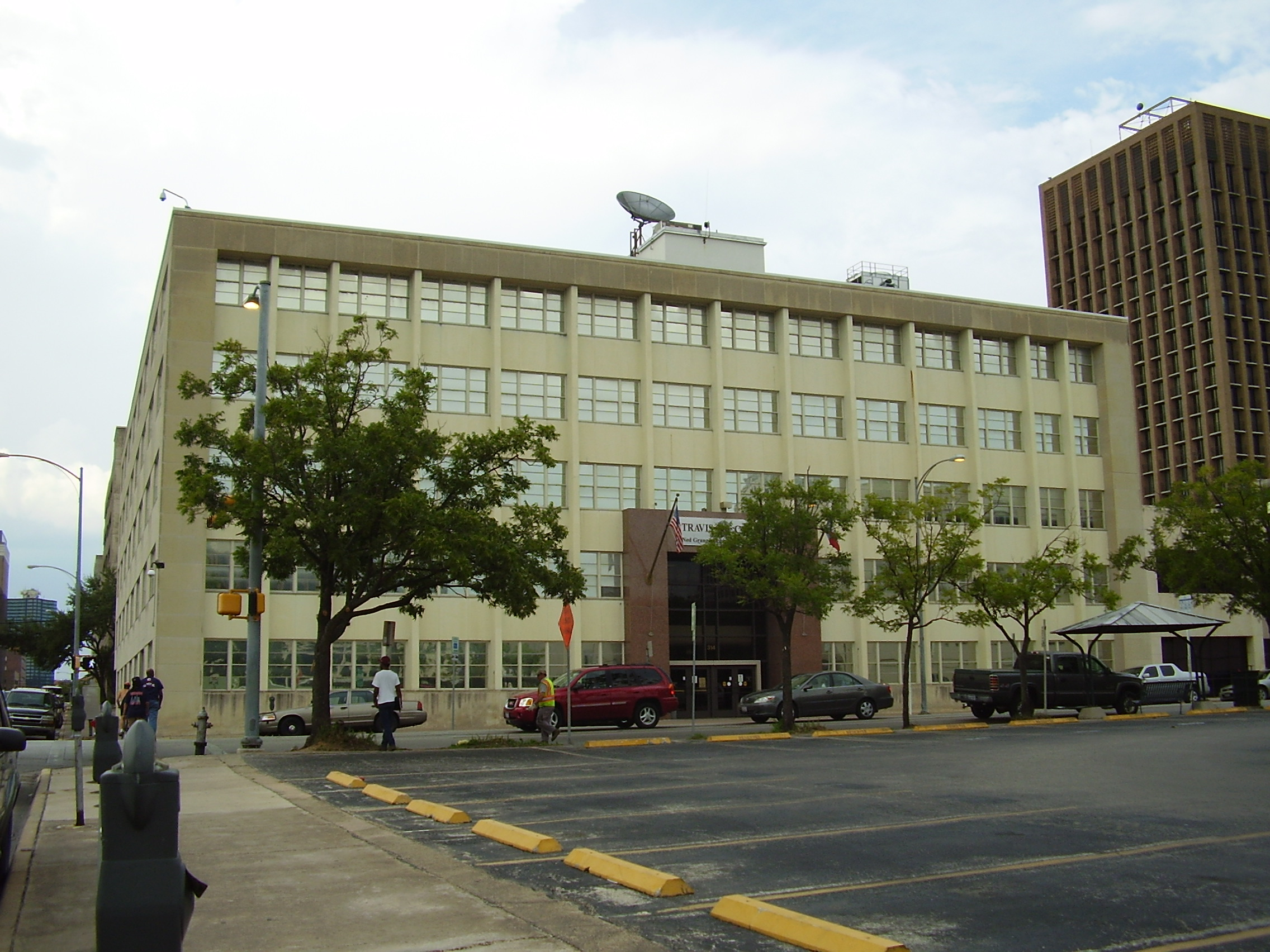
Ned Granger Administration Building in Austin

Like other Texas counties, Travis County is governed by a Commissioners' Court composed of the county judge and four county commissioners. The court levies county taxes and sets the budgets for county officials and agencies. The judge and commissioners are elected for four-year terms (the judge at-large, and the commissioners from geographic precincts). The other major county-wide official is the county clerk, who maintains the county's records, administers elections, and oversees legal documentation (such as property deeds, marriage licenses and assumed name certificates). The clerk is also elected at-large for a four-year term.

The Heman Marion Sweatt Travis County Courthouse is located in downtown Austin. The county courthouse holds civil and criminal trial courts and other functions of county government. As of 2017, the county's probate courts are in the process of being moved from the county courthouse into Austin's 1936 United States Courthouse, which was acquired by the county in 2016.

=== Corrections ===
The Travis County Jail and the Travis County Criminal Justice Center are located in downtown Austin. The Travis County Correctional Complex is located in an unincorporated area in Travis County, next to Austin-Bergstrom International Airport.

The Texas Department of Criminal Justice operates the Travis County State Jail, a state jail for men, in eastern Austin.

=== Politics ===
Travis County is one of the most consistently Democratic counties in Texas, having voted for the Democratic presidential nominee all but five times since 1932. The only exceptions have been the Republican landslide years of 1952, 1956, 1972 and 1984, when Dwight Eisenhower, Richard Nixon and Ronald Reagan each won over 400 electoral votes, and 2000, when the Republican nominee was incumbent Texas Governor George W. Bush. In 2005, Travis County was the only county in Texas to vote against the Proposition 2 state constitutional amendment banning gay marriage, with slightly under 60% of voters being against it.

In 2020, Travis County backed Democrat Joe Biden with nearly 72% of the vote, his strongest showing in the state and the best showing for any presidential candidate in the county since 1948. While Kamala Harris in 2024 lost some ground since 2020, her performance of 68% made Travis County the most Democratic of all Texas counties in that election. This was partly due to the Republican shift in all majority-Hispanic counties in south and west Texas, many of which held this record in the past.

The county's Democratic bent is not limited to the presidential level, as all of the county-level officials are Democrats. The county is home to UT Austin; Democrats generally do very well in counties with large public universities. In addition, the majority of the county is represented by Democrats in the US Congress, Texas Senate, and Texas House.

United States presidential election results for Travis County, Texas
Year	Republican		Democratic		Third party(ies)	
Year	No.	%	No.	%	No.	%
1912	468	12.04%	2,741	70.54%	677	17.42%
1916	690	15.47%	3,682	82.54%	89	2.00%
1920	1,204	20.39%	3,541	59.97%	1,160	19.64%
1924	1,909	19.43%	7,573	77.06%	345	3.51%
1928	4,847	51.83%	4,487	47.98%	17	0.18%
1932	1,532	11.45%	11,718	87.60%	126	0.94%
1936	1,154	8.60%	12,092	90.07%	179	1.33%
1940	3,128	15.26%	17,300	84.38%	75	0.37%
1944	2,324	12.09%	14,384	74.80%	2,522	13.11%
1948	5,994	22.03%	19,598	72.03%	1,615	5.94%
1952	20,850	52.06%	19,155	47.83%	46	0.11%
1956	23,551	53.98%	19,982	45.80%	98	0.22%
1960	22,107	44.87%	27,022	54.85%	135	0.27%
1964	19,838	31.02%	44,058	68.89%	62	0.10%
1968	34,309	41.58%	39,667	48.07%	8,544	10.35%
1972	70,561	56.30%	54,157	43.21%	611	0.49%
1976	71,031	46.67%	78,585	51.63%	2,597	1.71%
1980	73,151	45.69%	75,028	46.87%	11,914	7.44%
1984	124,944	56.84%	94,124	42.82%	745	0.34%
1988	105,915	44.86%	127,783	54.13%	2,386	1.01%
1992	88,105	31.89%	130,546	47.26%	57,584	20.85%
1996	98,454	39.97%	128,970	52.36%	18,877	7.66%
2000	141,235	46.88%	125,526	41.67%	34,502	11.45%
2004	147,885	42.00%	197,235	56.01%	6,993	1.99%
2008	136,981	34.25%	254,017	63.52%	8,890	2.22%
2012	140,152	36.21%	232,788	60.14%	14,117	3.65%
2016	127,209	27.14%	308,260	65.77%	33,251	7.09%
2020	161,337	26.43%	435,860	71.41%	13,152	2.15%
2024	170,787	29.38%	398,981	68.64%	11,508	1.98%

United States Senate election results for Travis County, Texas1
Year	Republican		Democratic		Third party(ies)	
Year	No.	%	No.	%	No.	%
2024	157,203	27.17%	407,210	70.39%	14,128	2.44%

United States Senate election results for Travis County, Texas2
Year	Republican		Democratic		Third party(ies)	
Year	No.	%	No.	%	No.	%
2020	175,860	29.28%	408,528	68.02%	16,221	2.70%
2026	109,791	20.01%	430,707	78.48%	8,284	1.51%

Texas Gubernatorial election results for Travis County
Year	Republican		Democratic		Third party(ies)	
Year	No.	%	No.	%	No.	%
2022	119,321	25.89%	334,667	72.61%	6,911	1.50%
2026	127,275	23.14%	415,011	75.47%	7,635	1.39%

=== United States Congress ===
Representatives	Name	Party	First elected	Current term	Area(s) of Travis County represented
District 10	Michael McCaul	Republican	2004	10th	Avery Ranch, Elgin, Lago Vista, Lakeway, Pflugerville, West Lake Hills
District 17	Pete Sessions	Republican	2020	3rd (Note: Pete Sessions previously represented the Dallas-based 32nd District. He was defeated by Colin Allred in the 2018 midterm elections. In 2020, he won the Central-Texas-based 17th District seat to replace outgoing Congressman Bill Flores.)	Pflugerville
District 21	Chip Roy	Republican	2018	4th	Barton Creek, Oak Hill
District 35	Greg Casar	Democratic	2022	2nd	East Austin, Del Valle, Manor,
District 37	Lloyd Doggett	Democratic	1994	15th	West Austin, Rollingwood, Sunset Valley, West Lake Hills

=== Texas Senate ===
State Senators serve four year terms with no term limits.

Representatives	Name	Party	First elected	Area(s) of Travis County represented
District 14	Sarah Eckhardt	Democratic	2020	Austin, Elgin, Manor, Pflugerville, Rollingwood West Lake Hills
District 21	Judith Zaffirini	Democratic	1987	East Austin, Del Valle
District 25	Donna Campbell	Republican	2013	Bee Cave, Lago Vista, Lakeway

=== Texas House of Representatives ===
State Representatives serve two year terms with no term limits.

Representatives	Name	Party	First elected	Area(s) of Travis County represented
District 19	Ellen Troxclair	Republican	2022	Lago Vista
District 46	Sheryl Cole	Democratic	2018	East Austin, Elgin, Huston-Tillotson University, Manor
District 47	Vikki Goodwin	Democratic	2018	West Austin, Bee Cave, Lakeway
District 48	Donna Howard	Democratic	2006	West Austin, South Austin, Rollingwood, West Lake Hills
District 49	Gina Hinojosa	Democratic	2016	Central Austin, The University of Texas
District 50	James Talarico	Democratic	2018	Northeast Austin, Pflugerville
District 51	Lulu Flores	Democratic	2022	Southeast Austin, Del Valle, St Edwards University

=== 3rd Court of Appeals ===
In addition to Travis, the 3rd Court of Appeals hears cases from 23 other counties across Central Texas: Bastrop, Bell, Blanco, Burnet, Caldwell, Coke, Comal, Concho, Fayette, Hays, Irion, Lampasas, Lee, Llano, McColluch, Milam, Mills, Runnels, San Saba, Schleicher, Sterling, Tom Green, and Williamson.

All 24 counties in the district vote for justices. Justices serve six year terms in at-large seats with no term limits, besides a mandatory retirement age of 75 years old.

Following the 2018 midterm elections, Democrats flipped the majority on the 3rd Court of Appeals.

Since 2022, all elected 3rd Court of Appeals judges are members of the Democratic Party.

Place	Name	Last Election	Elected	Term Up
1	Darlene Byrne (Chief Justice)	52.2% D	2020	2026
2	Maggie Ellis	50.9% D	2024	2030
3	Chari L. Kelly	Uncontested	2018	2030
4	Rosa Lopez Theofanis	52.6% D	2022	2028
5	Karin Crump	Uncontested	2024	2030
6	Gisela Triana	Uncontested	2018	2030

=== State District Courts ===
Judges serve a 4-year term, with no term limits.

As of January 2025, all elected Travis County State District Court judges are members of the Democratic Party.

District	Name	Area of Focus	Term	Elected	Term Up
53rd	Maria Cantú Hexsel	Civil & Family	2nd	2020	2028
98th	Sandra Avila Ramirez	Civil & Family	1st	2024	2028
126th	Aurora Martinez Jones	Civil & Family	2nd	2020	2028
147th	Cliff Brown	Criminal	4th	2010	2026
167th	Dayna Blazey	Criminal	2nd	2020	2028
200th	Jessica Mangrum	Civil & Family	2nd	2020	2028
201st	Amy Clark Meachum	Civil & Family	4th	2010	2026
250th	Karin Crump	Civil & Family	3rd	2014	2026
261st	Daniella DeSeta Lyttle	Civil & Family	1st	2022	2026
299th	Karen Sage	Criminal	4th	2010	2026
331st	Chantal Eldridge	Criminal	2nd	2018	2026
345th	Jan Soifer	Civil & Family	3rd	2016	2028
353rd	Sherine Thomas	Civil & Family	1st	2024	2028
390th	Julie Kocurek	Criminal	7th	1999	2028
403rd	Brandy Mueller	Criminal	1st	2022	2026
419th	Catherine Mauzy	Civil & Family	2nd	2018	2026
427th	Tamara Needles	Criminal	3rd	2016	2028
450th	Brad Urrutia	Criminal	2nd	2016	2028
455th	Laurie Eiserloh	Civil & Family	1st	2022	2026
459th	Maya Guerra Gamble	Civil & Family	2nd	2018	2026
460th	Selena Alvarenga	Criminal	2nd	2020	2028

=== County government ===
As of January 2025, all county elected officials are members of the Democratic Party.

District	Position	Name	Term	Elected	Term Up
At-Large	County Judge	Andy Brown	2nd	2020	2026
Precinct 1	Commissioner	Jeff Travillion	3rd	2016	2028
Precinct 2	Commissioner	Brigid Shea	3rd	2016	2026
Precinct 3	Commissioner	Ann Howard	2nd	2020	2028
Precinct 4	Commissioner	Margaret Gómez	8th	1994	2026
At-Large	District Attorney	José Garza	2nd	2020	2028
At-Large	County Attorney	Delia Garza	2nd	2020	2028
At-Large	District Clerk	Velva Price	3rd	2014	2026
At-Large	County Clerk	Dyana Limon-Mercado	1st	2022	2026
At-Large	Treasurer	Dolores Ortega Carter	10th	1986	2026
At-Large	Sheriff	Sally Hernandez	3rd	2016	2030
At-Large	Tax Assessor-Collector	Celia Israel	1st	2024	2028
Precinct 1	Constable	Tonya Nixon	2nd	2020	2028
Precinct 2	Constable	Adan Ballesteros	5th	2008	2028
Precinct 3	Constable	Stacy Suits	3rd	2016	2028
Precinct 4	Constable	George Morales III	3rd	2016	2028
Precinct 5	Constable	Carlos B. Lopez	4th	2012	2028
Precinct 1	Justice of the Peace	Yvonne Michelle Williams	4th	2010	2026
Precinct 2	Justice of the Peace	Randall Slagle	3rd	2014	2026
Precinct 3	Justice of the Peace	Sylvia Holmes	2nd	2018	2026
Precinct 4	Justice of the Peace	Raúl Arturo Gonzalez	5th	2006	2026
Precinct 5	Justice of the Peace	Tanisa Jeffers	1st	2024	2026
At-Large	County Court At Law #1	Todd Wong	3rd	2014	2026
At-Large	County Court At Law #2	Eric Sheppard	3rd	2014	2026
At-Large	County Court At Law #3	Bianca Garcia	1st	2022	2026
At-Large	County Court At Law #4	Dimple Malhotra	2nd	2019*	2026
At-Large	County Court At Law #5	Mary Ann Espiritu	1st	2022	2026
At-Large	County Court At Law #6	Denise Hernandez	1st	2022	2026
At-Large	County Court At Law #7	Elisabeth A. Earle	6th	2002	2026
At-Large	County Court At Law #8	Carlos H. Barrera	5th	2008	2028
At-Large	County Court At Law #9	Kim Williams	3rd	2016	2028
At-Large	Probate Court**	Guy Herman	1st	2023*	2026
At-Large	Probate Court**	Nicholas Chu	2nd	2023*	2028
At-Large	Central Appraisal District, Place 1***	Jett Hanna	1st	2024	2028
At-Large	Central Appraisal District, Place 2***	Daniel Wang	1st	2024	2028
At-Large	Central Appraisal District, Place 3***	Dick Lavine	1st	2024	2028

*won a special election to complete an unexpired term

**court created in 2023

***office created in 2023, vacancies filled in special elections in May 2024

=== Austin Community College, Board of Trustees ===
The board governing the Austin Community College district, which Travis County is a part of alongside Hays, Caldwell, and Blanco counties, as well as portions of Williamson, Bastrop, Guadalupe, Lee, and Fayette counties. Members are elected in nonpartisan elections and serve six year terms.

Place	Name	Term	Elected	Term Up
1	Dana Walker	1st	2020*	2026
2	Gigi Edwards Bryant	2nd	2014	2026
3	Nan McRaven	4th	2002	2026
4	Sean Hassan	2nd	2016	2028
5	Manny Gonzalez	2nd	2022	2028
6	Steve Jackobs	1st	2022	2028
7	Sherri Taylor	1st	2024	2030
8	Stephanie Gharakhanian	2nd	2018	2030
9	Julie Ann Nitsch	2nd	2016*	2030

*won a special election to complete an unexpired term

== Economy ==
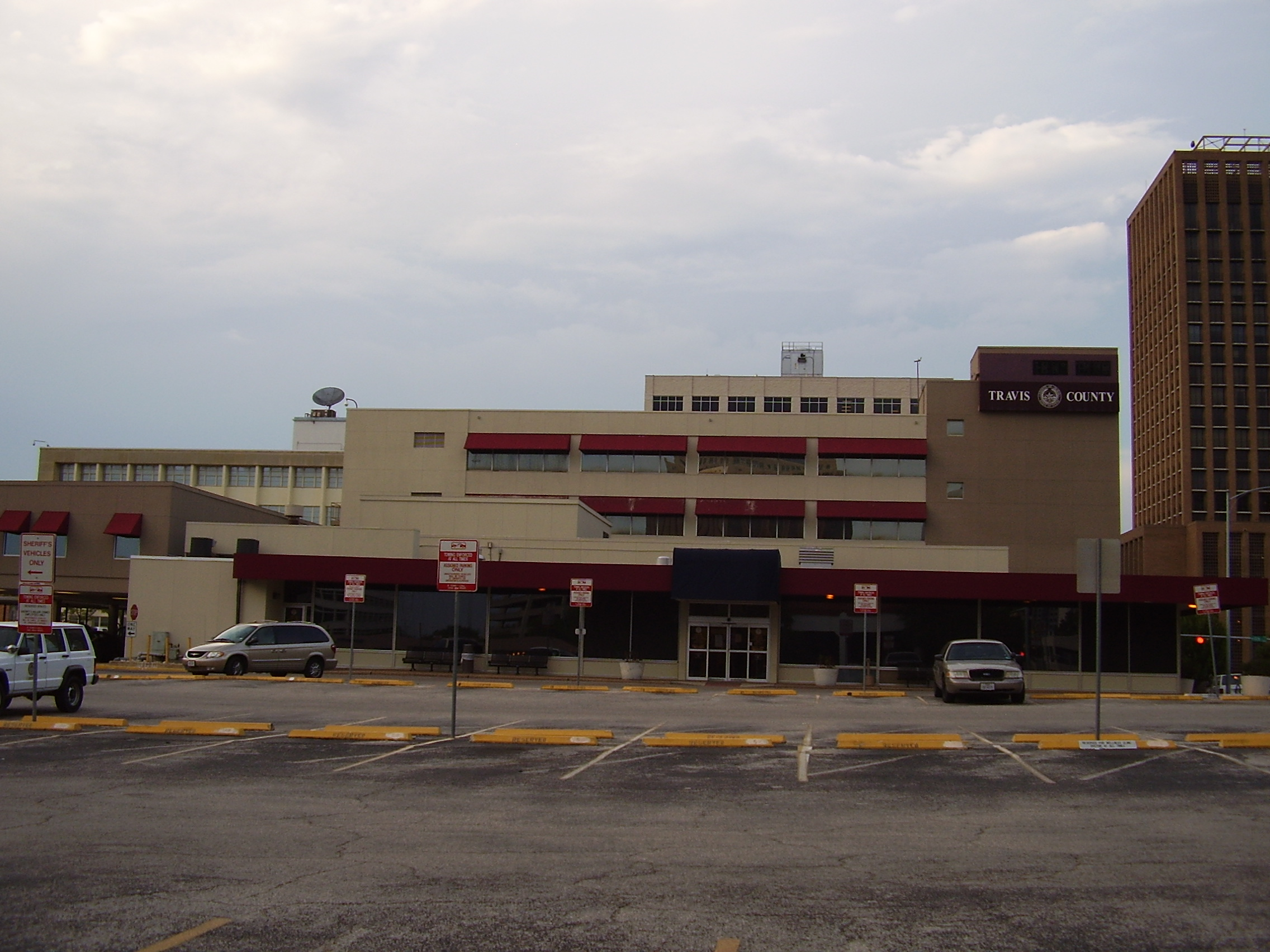
A county complex at 1010 Lavaca Street

As of 2017, Travis County had a median household income of $68,350 per year, and a per capita income of $38,820 per year. 13.9% of the population lived below the poverty level. The county's largest employers are governments (the State of Texas, the US Federal Government, Travis County and the City of Austin) and public education bodies. Other major employers are concentrated in industries relating to semiconductors, software engineering and healthcare.

== Education ==
=== K-12 education ===
Travis County is served by a number of public school districts; the largest is Austin Independent School District, serving most of Austin. Other districts wholly or mainly located in Travis County include Eanes ISD, Lake Travis ISD, Lago Vista ISD, Leander ISD, Del Valle ISD, Manor ISD, and Pflugerville ISD. Parts of Elgin ISD, Coupland ISD, Hutto ISD, Round Rock ISD, Marble Falls ISD, Johnson City ISD, Dripping Springs ISD and Hays Consolidated ISD also cross into Travis County.

State-operated schools include:

- Texas School for the Blind and Visually Impaired
- Texas School for the Deaf

Texas Blind, Deaf, and Orphan School was formerly in operation for black students pre-desegregation.

=== Colleges and universities ===
The largest university in Travis County is the University of Texas at Austin. Other universities include St. Edward's University, Huston–Tillotson University, and Concordia University Texas.

Under Texas law Austin Community College District (ACC) is the designated community college for most of the county. However, areas in Marble Falls ISD are zoned to Central Texas College District.

== Healthcare and animal services ==
Central Health, a hospital district, was established in 2004. Brackenridge Hospital was originally built as the City-County Hospital in 1884 but Travis County ended its share of the ownership in 1907. In 2017 Brackenridge was replaced by the Dell Seton Medical Center.

Austin Animal Services provides animal services for the City of Austin and for unincorporated areas of Travis County. Pflugerville maintains its own municipal shelter. Cedar Park, Leander, and Round Rock contract to the Williamson County Regional Animal Shelter in Georgetown, which is run by Williamson County.

== Transportation ==
=== Major highways ===
- I-35
- US 183
- US 290
- SH 45
- SH 71
- SH 95
- SH 130
- SH 165
- Loop 1 (MoPac Expressway)
- Loop 111
- Loop 212
- Loop 275
- Loop 343
- Loop 360
- Spur 69 (unsigned; signed as RM 2222)

=== Mass transit ===
- The Capital Metropolitan Transportation Authority (CapMetro) serves Austin and select surrounding areas of Travis County. It also operates the CapMetro Rail Red Line commuter rail service connecting downtown Austin to Leander in Williamson County.
- The Capital Area Rural Transportation System (CARTS) connects Austin with rural areas and small towns in the rest of Central Texas.

=== Railroads ===
Amtrak's Austin station is located in downtown Austin and is served by the Texas Eagle which runs daily between Chicago and San Antonio, continuing on to Los Angeles several times a week.

Travis County is served by the Union Pacific Railroad and the Austin Western Railroad.

=== Air ===
- The Austin-Bergstrom International Airport is the major commercial airport serving Austin.

== Communities ==
=== Cities (multiple counties) ===
- Austin (county seat) (small parts in Hays and Williamson counties)
- Cedar Park (mostly in Williamson County)
- Elgin (mostly in Bastrop County)
- Leander (mostly in Williamson County)
- Mustang Ridge (small parts in Caldwell and Bastrop counties)
- Pflugerville (small part in Williamson County)
- Round Rock (mostly in Williamson County)

=== Cities ===
- Bee Cave
- Creedmoor
- Jonestown
- Lago Vista
- Lakeway
- Manor
- Rollingwood
- Sunset Valley
- West Lake Hills

=== Villages ===
- Briarcliff
- Point Venture
- San Leanna
- The Hills
- Volente
- Webberville

=== Census-designated places ===
- Barton Creek
- Garfield
- Hornsby Bend
- Hudson Bend
- Lost Creek
- Manchaca
- Shady Hollow
- Steiner Ranch
- Wells Branch

=== Unincorporated communities ===
- Bluff Springs
- Carl
- Carlson
- Cedar Valley
- Cele
- Colton
- Del Valle
- Dessau
- Dunlap
- Elroy
- Littig
- Lund
- Marshall Ford
- McNeil
- Moore's Crossing
- Nameless
- New Sweden
- Pilot Knob
- Round Mountain
- Spicewood
- Three Points
- Turnersville

=== Ghost towns ===
- Daffan
- Decker
- Maha
- Manda
- New Katy

=== Austin neighborhoods ===
- Anderson Mill
- Four Points
- Jollyville
- Kincheonville
- Merrilltown
- Montopolis
- Oak Hill
- Onion Creek
- Pleasant Hill
- Tanglewood Forest
- Windemere
- Waters Park

== See also ==
- Austin Bat Cave (non-profit educational org)
- List of museums in Central Texas
- National Register of Historic Places listings in Travis County, Texas
- Recorded Texas Historic Landmarks in Travis County
