= Round Mountain, Travis County, Texas =

- Unincorporated community
- Location within Texas Location within the United States
- Coordinates: 30°34′32″N 97°56′31″W
- Country: United States
- State: Texas
- County: Travis
- Elevation: 932 ft (284 m)
- Time zone: UTC-6 (Central (CST))
  - Summer (DST): UTC-5 (CDT)
- Area codes: 512 & 737
- GNIS feature ID: 2034570

Round Mountain is an unincorporated community in Travis County, in the U.S. state of Texas. According to the Handbook of Texas, the community had a population of 59 in 2000. It is located within the Greater Austin metropolitan area.

== Geography ==
Round Mountain is located 24 mi (39 km) northwest of Austin in northwestern Travis County near the Williamson County line.

== Education ==
Schools that serve the community today are Bagdad Elementary School, Stacy Kaye Danielson Middle School, and Glenn High School.
