= Three Points, Texas =

- Unincorporated community
- Location within Texas Location within the United States
- Coordinates: 30°27′6″N 97°39′44″W
- Country: United States
- State: Texas
- County: Travis
- Elevation: 824 ft (251 m)
- Time zone: UTC-6 (Central (CST))
  - Summer (DST): UTC-5 (CDT)
- Area codes: 512 & 737
- GNIS feature ID: 1369886

Three Points is an unincorporated community in Travis County, in the U.S. state of Texas. It is located within the Greater Austin metropolitan area.

== Geography ==
Three Points is located on FM 1825, 13 mi (21 km) north of Austin in northern Travis County.

== Education ==
The community is served by the Pflugerville Independent School District. Schools that serve the community today are Caldwell Elementary School, Pflugerville Middle School, and Pflugerville High School.
