= Garfield, Texas =

- CDP
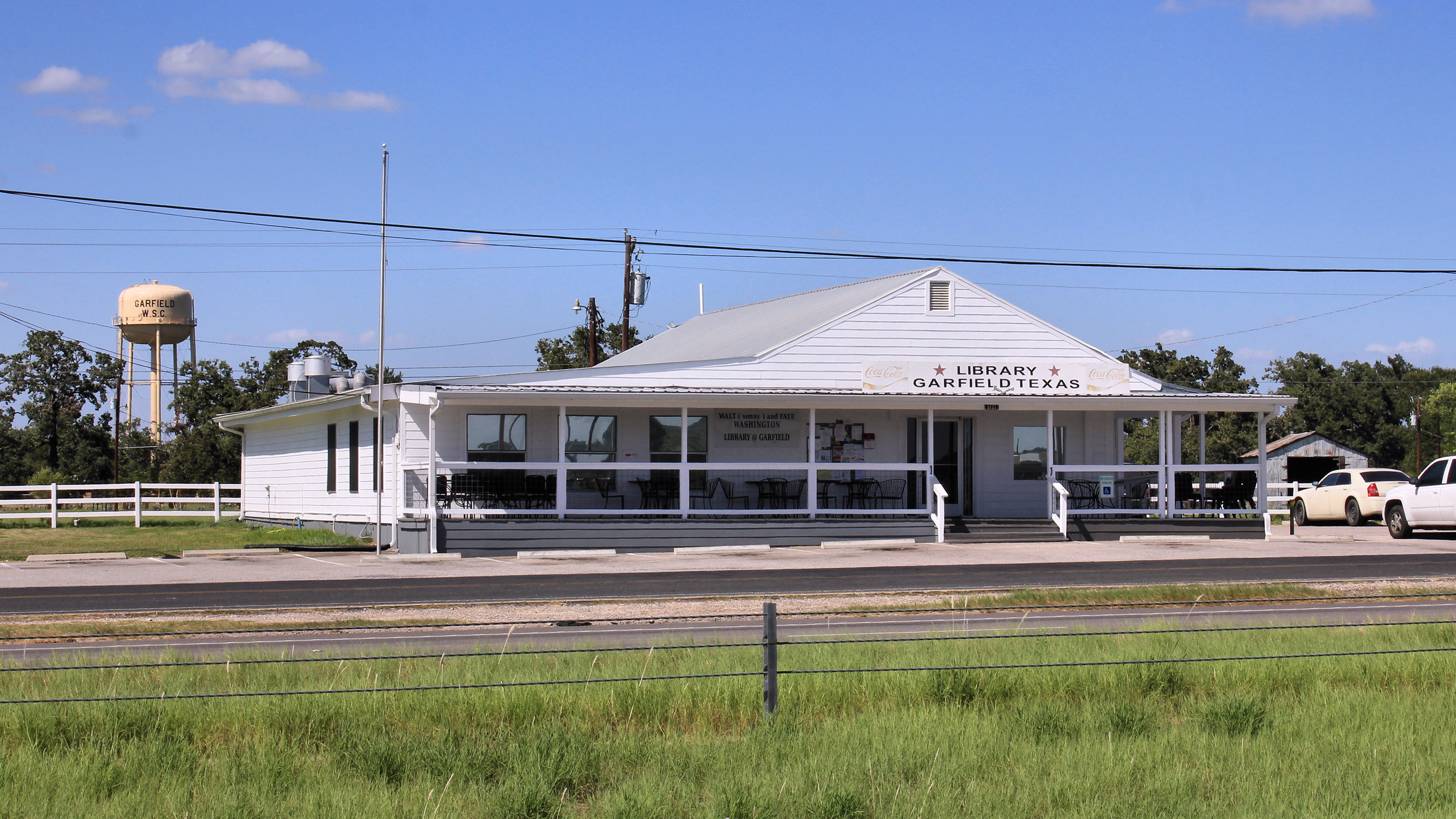
- Library and water tower

- Coordinates: 30°11′46″N 97°33′05″W
- Country: United States
- State: Texas
- County: Travis

Area
  - Total: 12.2 sq mi (31.6 km^{2})
  - Land: 12.0 sq mi (31.1 km^{2})
  - Water: 0.19 sq mi (0.5 km^{2})
- Elevation: 476 ft (145 m)

Population (2020)
  - Total: 1,825
  - Density: 152/sq mi (58.7/km^{2})
- Time zone: UTC-6 (Central (CST))
  - Summer (DST): UTC-5 (CDT)
- ZIP code: 78617
- Area code(s): 512 & 737
- FIPS code: 48-28320
- GNIS feature ID: 2408282

Garfield is a census-designated place (CDP) in Travis County, Texas, United States. As of the 2020 census, the CDP population was 1,825.

== Geography ==
Garfield is located 12 miles (19 km) southeast of downtown Austin.

According to the United States Census Bureau in 2000, the CDP has a total area of 13.9 square miles (35.9 km^{2}), of which 13.7 square miles (35.4 km^{2}) was land and 0.2 square mile (0.5 km^{2}) (1.44%) was water. Prior to the 2010 census, part of the CDP was annexed to the city of Austin, reducing its area to 12.2 square miles (32 km^{2}), of which 12.0 square miles (31 km^{2}) was then land and 0.2 square miles (0.52 km^{2}) was water.

== Education ==
Garfield is served by the Del Valle Independent School District. The Del Valle and Hornsby-Dunlap elementary schools serve portions of the community. For middle school students are divided between Dailey Middle School and Del Valle Middle School. High school students are zoned to Del Valle High School.

The East Travis Gateway Library District operates the Garfield Library.

== Demographics ==
Historical population
Census	Pop.	Note	%±
1990	1,336		—
2000	1,660		24.3%
2010	1,698		2.3%
2020	1,825		7.5%
U.S. Decennial Census; 1850–1900 1910; 1920 1930 1940; 1950 1960 1970; 1980 1990 2000; 2010 2020

Garfield first appeared as a census designated place in the 1990 U.S. census.

=== 2020 census ===
Garfield CDP, Texas – Racial and ethnic composition Note: the US Census treats Hispanic/Latino as an ethnic category. This table excludes Latinos from the racial categories and assigns them to a separate category. Hispanics/Latinos may be of any race.
Race / Ethnicity (NH = Non-Hispanic)	Pop 2000	Pop 2010	Pop 2020	% 2000	% 2010	% 2020
White alone (NH)	1,039	836	665	62.59%	49.23%	36.44%
Black or African American alone (NH)	36	38	45	2.17%	2.24%	2.47%
Native American or Alaska Native alone (NH)	8	4	14	0.48%	0.24%	0.77%
Asian alone (NH)	18	8	8	1.08%	0.47%	0.44%
Native Hawaiian or Pacific Islander alone (NH)	0	0	1	0.00%	0.00%	0.05%
Other race alone (NH)	0	3	11	0.00%	0.18%	0.60%
Mixed race or Multiracial (NH)	25	23	50	1.51%	1.35%	2.74%
Hispanic or Latino (any race)	534	786	1,031	32.17%	46.29%	56.49%
Total	1,660	1,698	1,825	100.00%	100.00%	100.00%

=== 2000 census ===
As of the census of 2000, there were 1,660 people, 550 households, and 421 families residing in the CDP. The population density was 121.3 inhabitants per square mile (46.8/km^{2}). There were 585 housing units at an average density of 42.7 per square mile (16.5/km^{2}). The racial makeup of the CDP was 73.73% White, 2.35% African American, 0.54% Native American, 1.08% Asian, 19.46% from other races, and 2.83% from two or more races. Hispanic or Latino of any race were 32.17% of the population.

There were 550 households, out of which 37.8% had children under the age of 18 living with them, 55.8% were married couples living together, 14.0% had a female householder with no husband present, and 23.3% were non-families. 15.8% of all households were made up of individuals, and 6.4% had someone living alone who was 65 years of age or older. The average household size was 3.02 and the average family size was 3.36.

In the CDP, the population was spread out, with 30.2% under the age of 18, 9.0% from 18 to 24, 27.8% from 25 to 44, 24.3% from 45 to 64, and 8.7% who were 65 years of age or older. The median age was 33 years. For every 100 females, there were 107.8 males. For every 100 females age 18 and over, there were 111.3 males.

The median income for a household in the CDP was $48,618, and the median income for a family was $53,558. Males had a median income of $30,125 versus $25,074 for females. The per capita income for the CDP was $24,957. About 9.5% of families and 13.4% of the population were below the poverty line, including 21.9% of those under age 18 and 6.3% of those age 65 or over.

== Climate ==
Climate is characterized by relatively high temperatures and evenly distributed precipitation throughout the year. The Köppen Climate Classification subtype for this climate is "Cfa" (Humid Subtropical Climate).

Climate data for Garfield, Texas
Month	Jan	Feb	Mar	Apr	May	Jun	Jul	Aug	Sep	Oct	Nov	Dec	Year
Mean daily maximum °C (°F)	16 (60)	18 (64)	22 (72)	26 (79)	29 (85)	33 (91)	35 (95)	35 (95)	32 (89)	27 (81)	21 (70)	17 (63)	26 (79)
Mean daily minimum °C (°F)	4 (40)	6 (43)	10 (50)	15 (59)	19 (66)	22 (72)	23 (74)	23 (74)	21 (69)	15 (59)	9 (49)	6 (42)	14 (58)
Average precipitation mm (inches)	53 (2.1)	61 (2.4)	53 (2.1)	71 (2.8)	110 (4.5)	84 (3.3)	41 (1.6)	58 (2.3)	89 (3.5)	86 (3.4)	61 (2.4)	56 (2.2)	830 (32.6)
Source: Weatherbase
