= Waters Park, Texas =

Village near Austin, Texas

Coordinates: 30°25′05″N 97°42′19″W

Waters Park (also known as Waters and Watters) was a village located 13 km (8 mi) north of downtown Austin, Texas defined by the boundaries of Farm to Market Road 1325, MoPac, and the Southern Pacific Railroad. It is now part of the City of Austin.

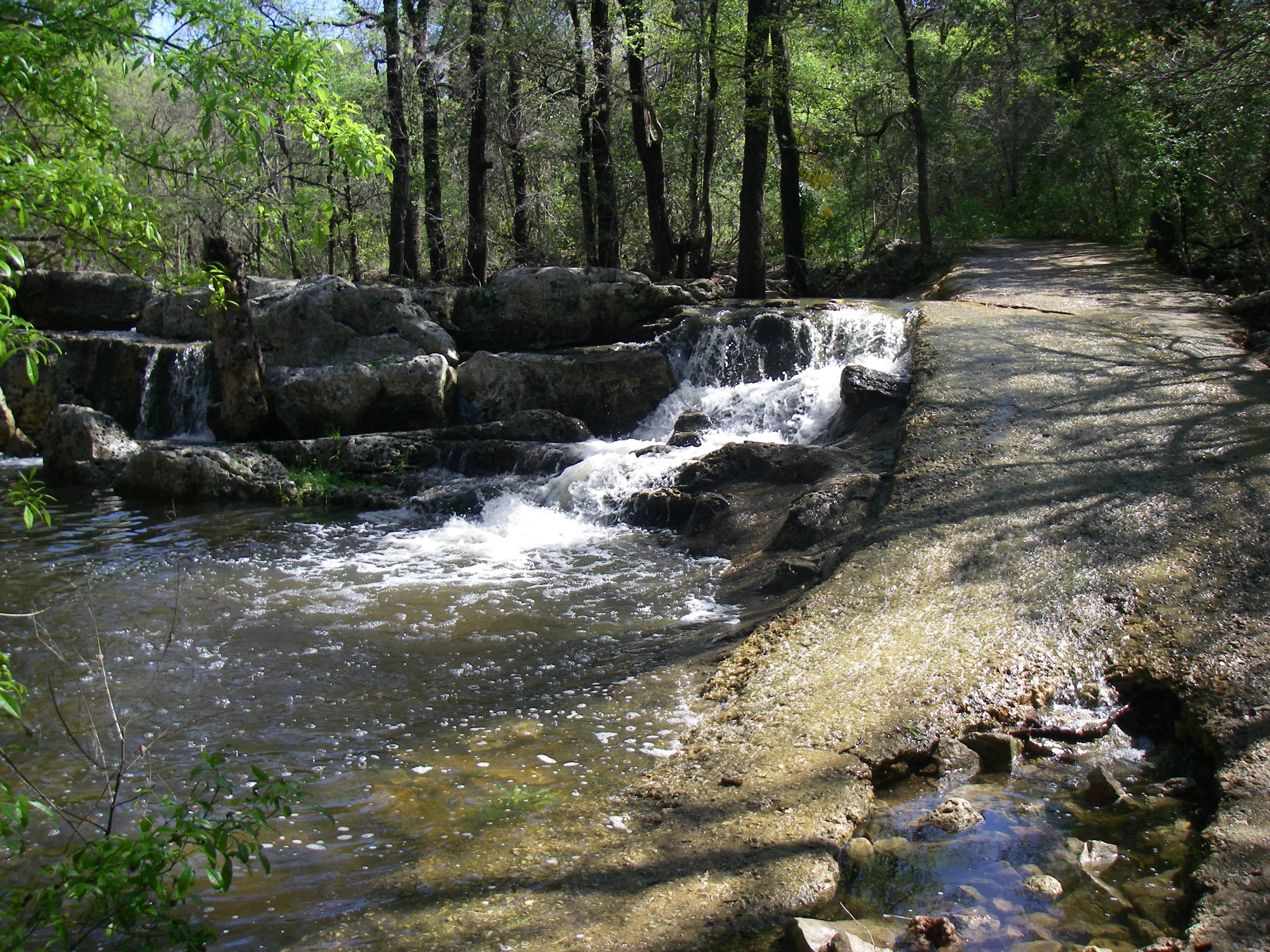
Park in present-day Waters Park

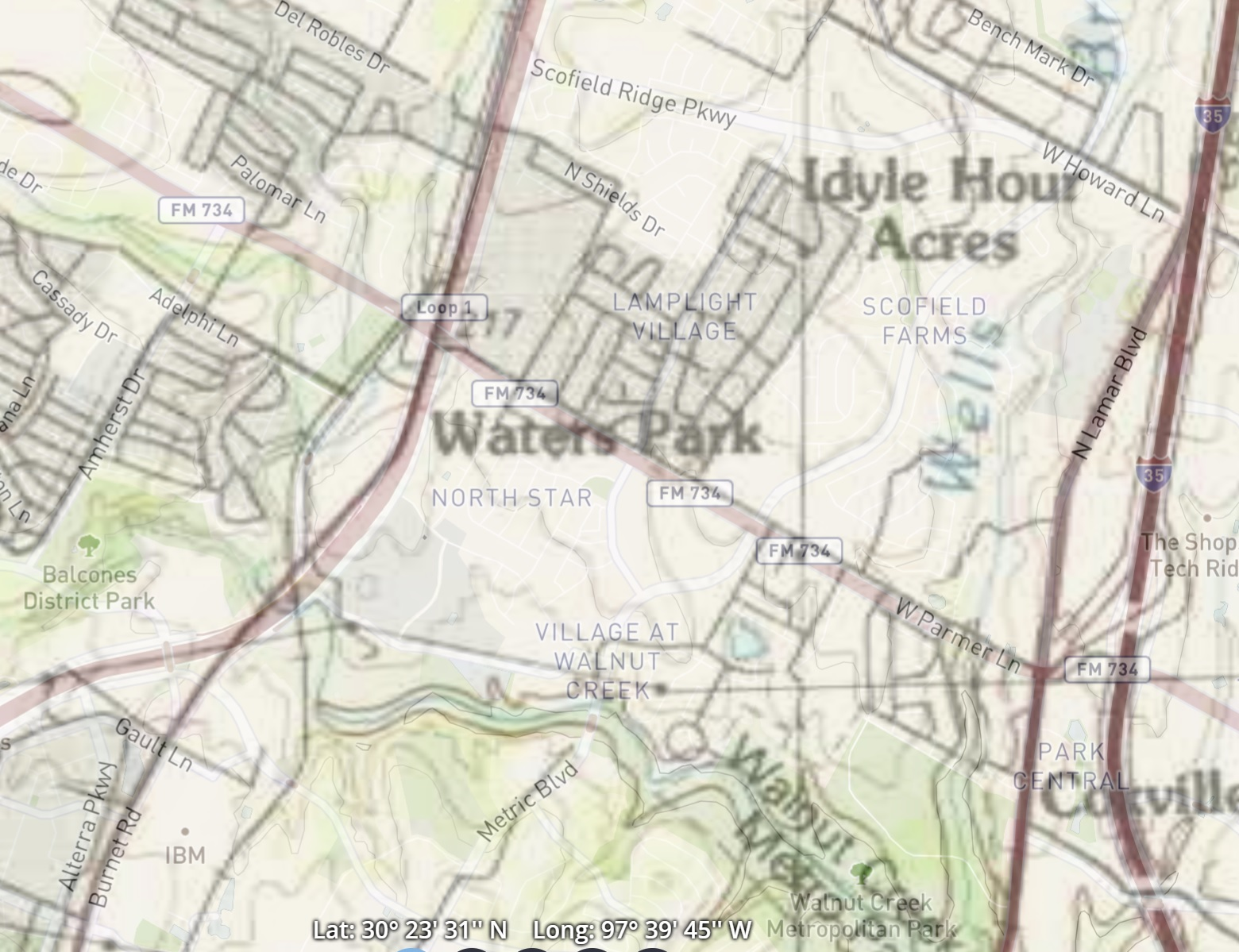
Location of Waters Park in a 1985 USGS map of Austin, TX overlaid a map of Austin, TX as it exists in 2021

== Name ==
The village was originally known as Summers' Grove, and the origin of the name Waters Park is unknown.

== History ==
The land at Waters Park was originally owned by Silas and Parthenia Summers who purchased the land in 1872. Right-of-way was sold to Austin and Northwestern Railroad in October 1881. The railroad built a park with a swimming pool, gazebo, baseball field, picnic grounds, and concessions stands in the summer of 1882. The area's railroad tracks were used to transport pink granite from Granite Mountain to the Texas State Capitol in Downtown Austin. Due to a bend in the tracks, trains would occasionally derail, accidentally dumping some of the pink granite. The rocks which remain are a local point of interest. The local post office opened in 1883 and closed in 1905.
The town was a popular vacation spot as it was easy to access via train from Austin. An advert in the June 14, 1882 edition of the Austin Daily Democratic Statesman read:

GRAND EXCURSION AND PICNIC to the town of WATERS

Fifteen miles by rail from Austin, on the NORTHWESTERN N.G. RAILWAY on Wednesday, June 21, 1882
Lots will be Sold on that Day–Terms Cash.
Waters is on Walnut Creek, seven miles from Round Rock, five from Pflugerville, in one of the richest parts of Travis County.
Trains leave Austin at 7:00 o'clock a.m. returning in the afternoon

Round trip tickets 59 cents only

— June 14, 1882, Austin Daily Democratic Statesman

The town proved historically to be Austin's fourth most popular day trip destination after the Austin Dam, Seiders Springs, and the then existent lake at Hyde Park.

== See also ==
- Austin, Texas
- Round Rock, Texas
- Georgetown, Texas
- History of Austin, Texas
- Texas State Capitol
