= Frame Switch, Texas =

Town in Texas, US

Coordinates: 30°33′34″N 97°27′42″W

Frame Switch is an unincorporated community located in Williamson County, Texas, United States. The town is roughly 30 miles northeast of Austin, Texas, and located between Hutto and Taylor. It was named after a David Frame of Ohio, the "Switch" being a switch on the Missouri Pacific Railroad and was originally settled in the late 1800s.
