= Webberville, Texas =

- Village
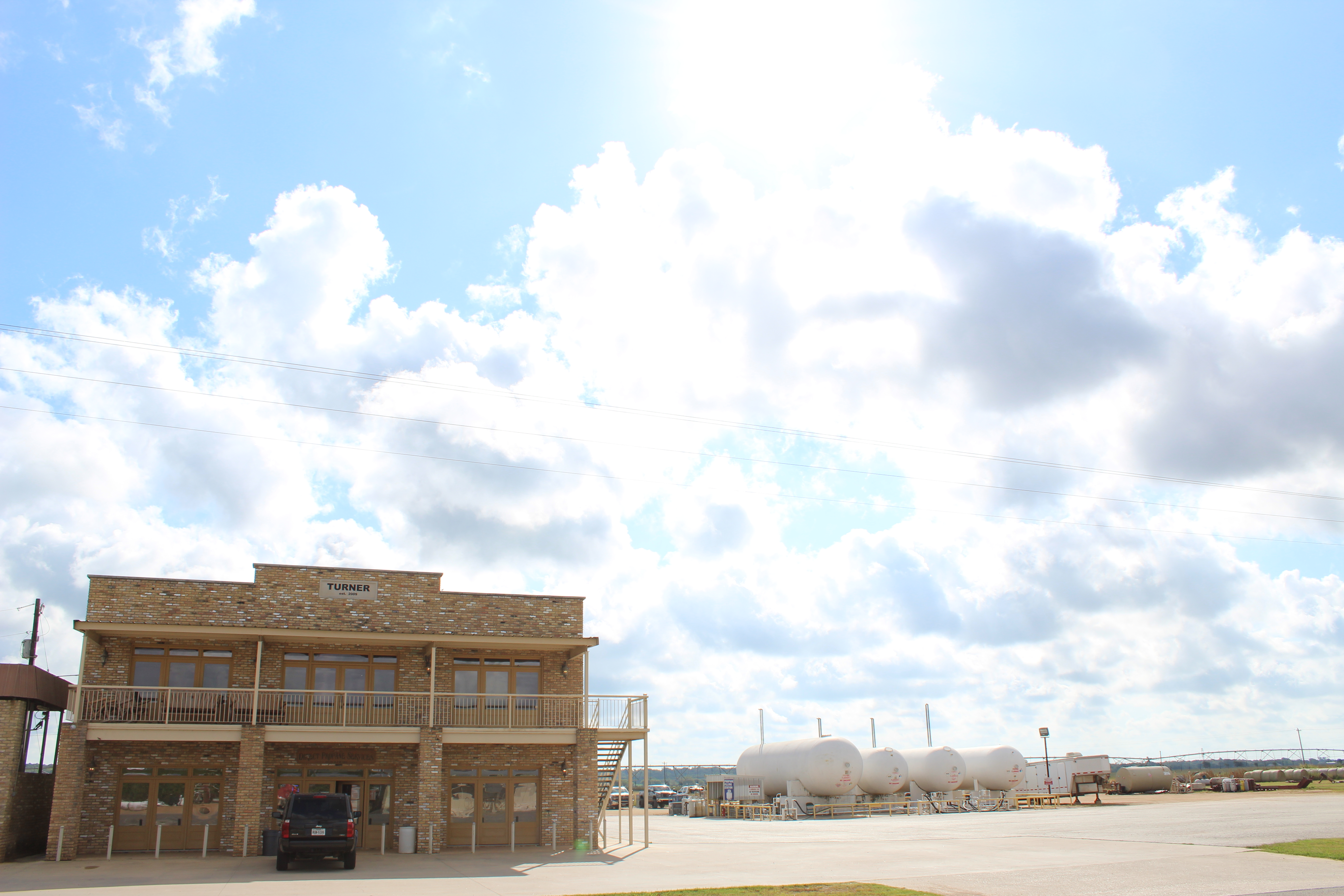

- Coordinates: 30°13′32″N 97°30′12″W
- Country: United States
- State: Texas
- County: Travis

Area
  - Total: 2.09 sq mi (5.42 km^{2})
  - Land: 2.09 sq mi (5.42 km^{2})
  - Water: 0 sq mi (0.00 km^{2})
- Elevation: 407 ft (124 m)

Population (2020)
  - Total: 394
  - Density: 188/sq mi (72.7/km^{2})
- Time zone: UTC-6 (Central (CST))
  - Summer (DST): UTC-5 (CDT)
- Zip Code: 78621, 78653
- FIPS code: 48-76924
- GNIS feature ID: 2413600
- Website: Webberville Village Commission

Webberville is a village in Travis County, Texas United States. Its population was 394 as of the 2020 census.

Comprising settlements dating back to 1827, Webber's Prairie was formally established by Silvia Hector and John Ferdinand Webber in the summer of 1832 on a land grant officially issued to John by the Republic of México on July 22, 1832. Webber's Prairie was renamed Webberville in 1853, and was incorporated as a Village in February 2003.

In December 2011, the new Webberville Solar Farm began generating solar energy with Gemini Solar Development Company for Austin Energy. In 2009, the two companies signed a 25-year contract. The 30 megawatt solar farm is expected to generate 1.4 billion kWh of electricity over 25 years.

== Geography ==
Webberville has a total area of 2.1 square miles (5.4 km^{2}), all land.

== Demographics ==
Historical population
Census	Pop.	Note	%±
2010	392		—
2020	394		0.5%
U.S. Decennial Census

== Education ==
The Del Valle Independent School District serves area students. Joseph Gilbert Elementary School serves the community. Students are also zoned to Dailey Middle School, and Del Valle High School.
