= Del Valle High School (Travis County, Texas) =

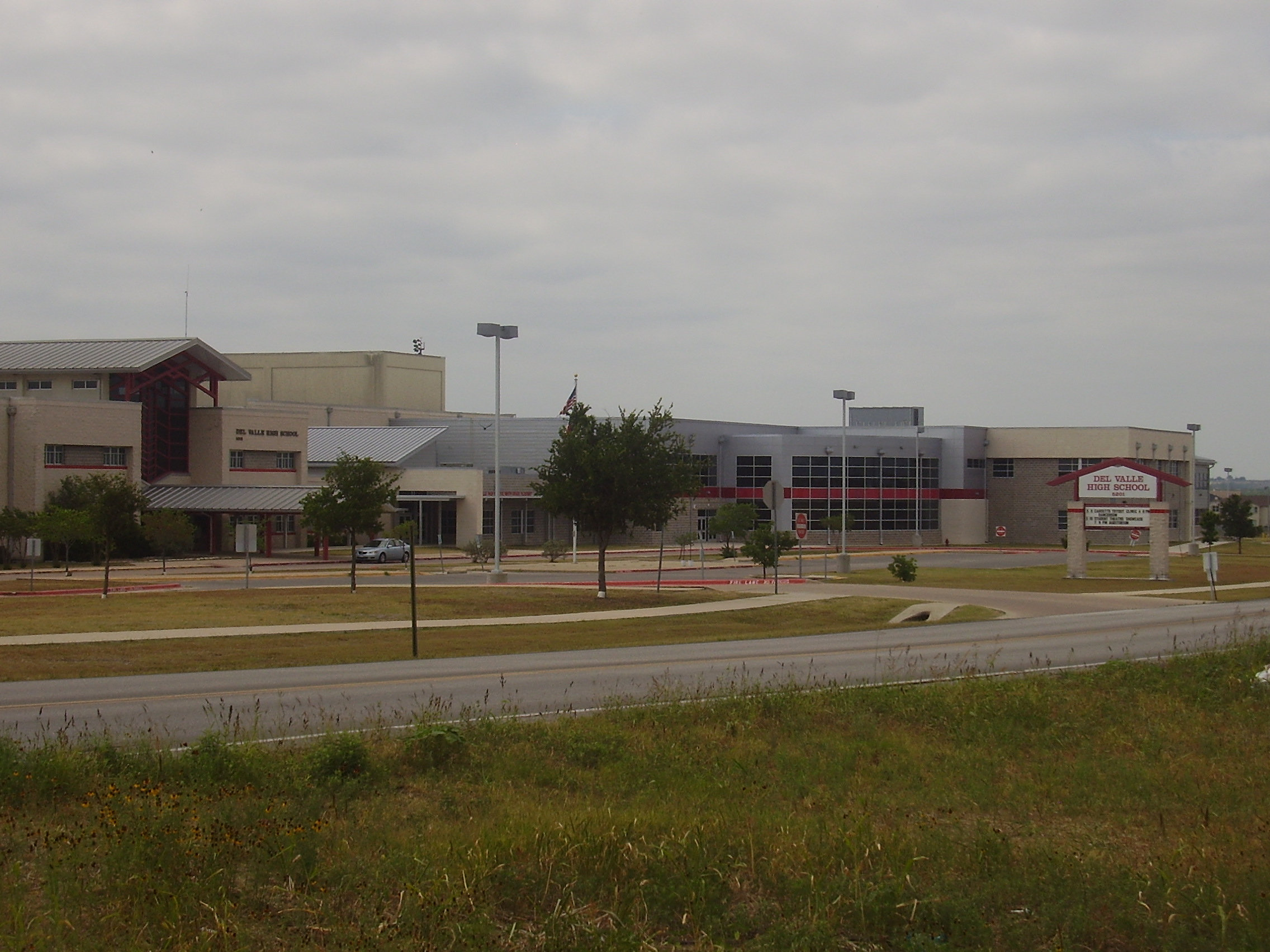

Location
- 5201 Ross Rd; Del Valle, Texas 78617; United States
- Coordinates: 30°10′49″N 97°36′46″W

Information
- Other names: DVHS, Del Valle, DV
- Type: Public
- Motto: "Whatever It Takes"
- Founded: 1956
- School district: Del Valle Independent School District
- Principal: Larry De La Cruz
- Teaching staff: 198.59 (on an FTE basis)
- Grades: 9-12
- Enrollment: 3,782 (2025–2026)
- Student to teacher ratio: 17.64
- Colors: Red , Black & White
- Athletics conference: UIL Class 6A
- Mascot: Cardinal
- Newspaper: The Red Wing
- Website: https://dvhs.dvisd.net/

Del Valle High School is a public high school located in the Del Valle community in unincorporated Travis County, Texas, United States and is part of the Del Valle Independent School District. The high school serves the communities of Austin, Creedmoor, Garfield, Mustang Ridge, Pilot Knob, Elroy, Webberville, and Hornsby Bend.

It is affiliated with Austin Community College.

It was given a "recognized" rating by TEA (Texas Education Agency) for the 2008-2009 school year.

== History ==
In 1956, Del Valle Junior-Senior High School was built to serve grades seven through ten, and grade eleven was added 1957, and a mascot and colors were chosen. During that year, grade twelve was added as was the Cardinal field. Eventually, a new junior-high school was built and served grades seven and eight and an athletic and physical-education field was approved for both the junior high and high school. As time went on, other common school districts kept joining the Colorado Common School District, a.k.a. Del Valle Independent School District (DVISD), and when the Austin-Bergstrom International Airport was built, Del Valle High School and all other DVISD schools were relocated to their current locations. In 2000, the new high-school was built on its present site, and in 2007 the district passed another bond-issue, which money was used to relocate the Del Valle Opportunity Center, a new elementary and middle-school were built, and a ninth-grade academy, which is annexed to the high school.

== Freshman Academy ==
The Freshman Academy is the high-school's ninth-grade center which was formed to support incoming Freshmen. The academy aids students in all academic areas. It also offers summer freshman parent/student orientation, a ninth-grade wing, academic teaming, freshman awards, freshman celebration parties, tutorials, and additional administrators.

== The Go Center ==
The Go Center is a place where students find information and guidance in making college and career choices. It consists of the school's college and career counselor and many tools that students of each grade level can use to prepare for and be informed on post-secondary education or the military.

== Notable alumni ==
- Curtis Jerrells (born 1987), basketball player for Olimpia Milano
