= Del Valle Independent School District =

School district in Texas

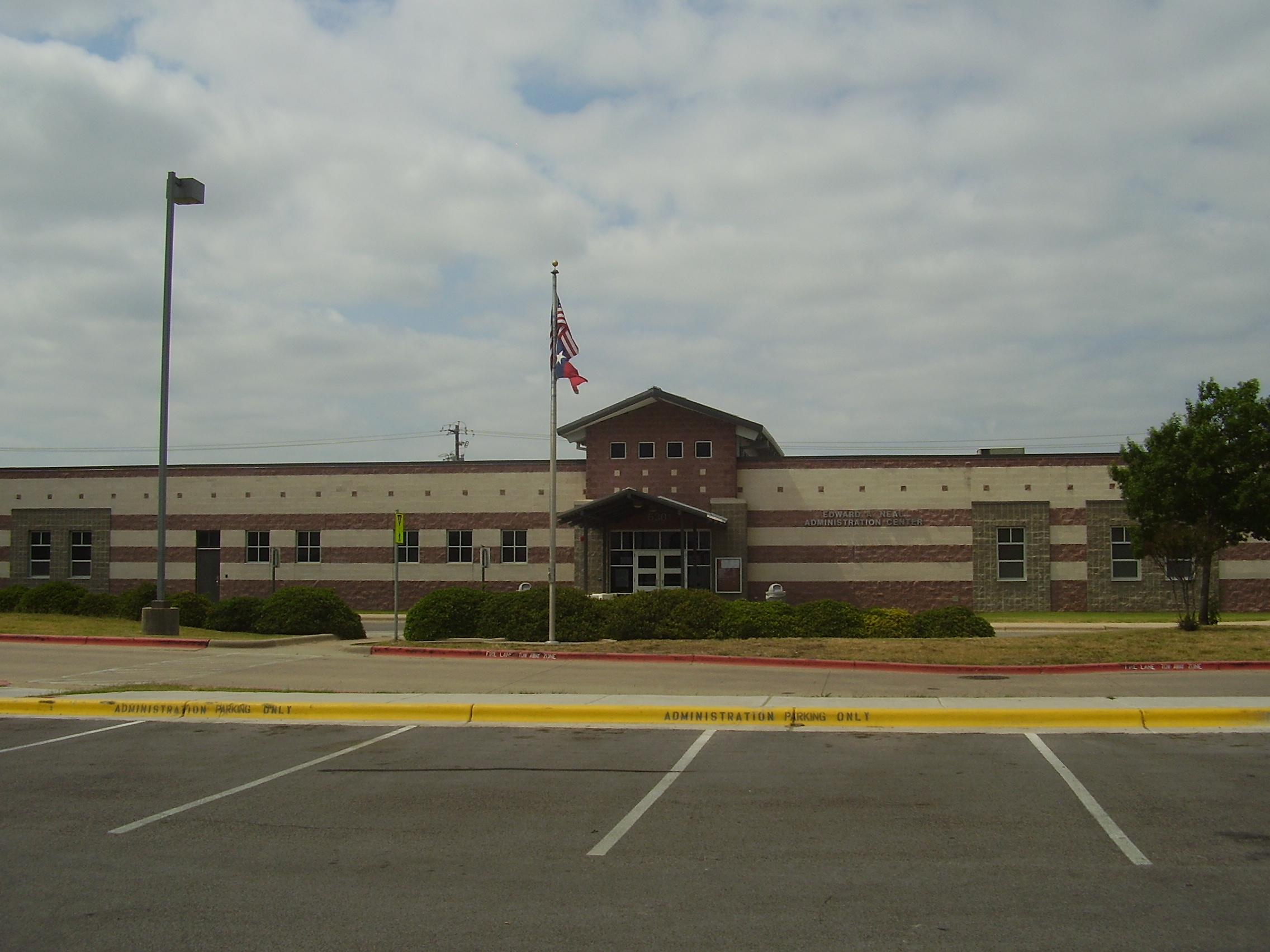
- Edward A. Neal Administration Building

Address
- 5301 Ross Road Del Valle Travis County, Texas United States

District information
- Superintendent: Matthew Gutierrez
- Governing agency: Texas Education Agency
- Schools: 15
- Budget: $112,572,774 (2018–19)
- NCES District ID: 4816620

Students and staff
- Students: 11,681 (2024–2025)
- Teachers: 782.77 (on an FTE basis)
- Staff: 1,872.5 (2024-2025)
- Student–teacher ratio: 14.42:1

Other information
- Website: www.dvisd.net

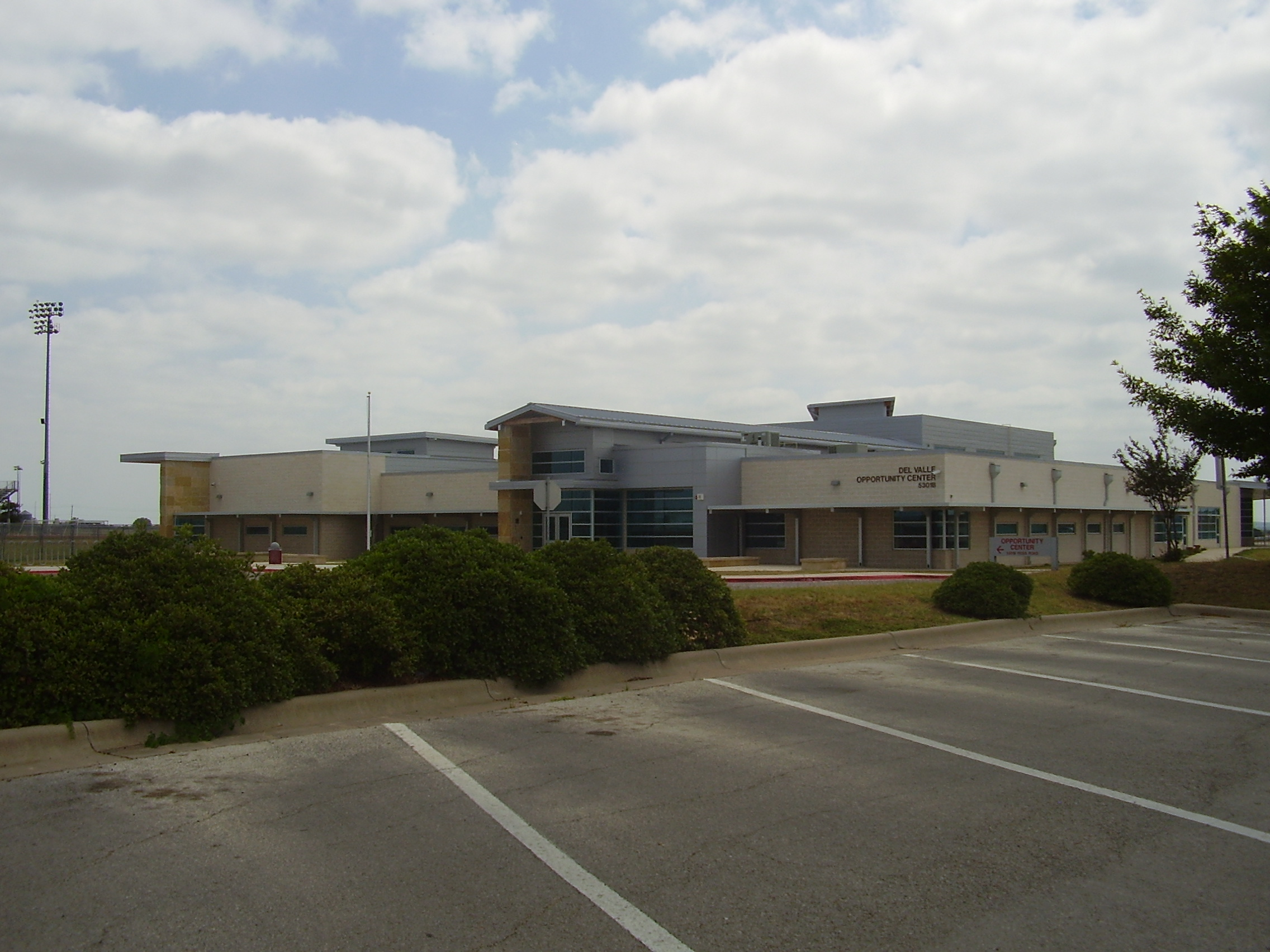
Del Valle Opportunity Center

Del Valle Independent School District (DVISD) is a public school district in the Del Valle community area of unincorporated Travis County, Texas (USA).

The school district, named after a land grant, serves much of southeast Travis County. Incorporated communities in the district include Creedmoor, Webberville, most of Mustang Ridge, and parts of Austin. The Garfield census-designated place and the unincorporated communities of Elroy, Hornsby Bend, and Pilot Knob also lie within the district. As of 2013 DVISD covers 38.2 square miles (99 km^{2}) of land within the City of Austin, making up 12% of the city's territory. The boundary of DVISD is about 75% in size of that of the Austin Independent School District.

In 2019, the school district had a four-year graduation rate of 92.4%.

== History ==
Originally the facilities of the Colorado Common School District Number 36 were at the intersection of U.S. Highway 183 and Texas State Highway 71. In 1952 the City of Austin annexed about one third of the district territory, including Montopolis and the property of the Austin Country Club. Since the existing school buildings were located on that property, the district needed to find a new location for its schools. Popham Elementary School opened across from Bergstrom Air Force Base; when Bergstrom was in operation, the district served the children living on the base. At the time the district taught grades one through eight. High school students attended the Austin Independent School District.

In 1954 the school district annexed the Dry Creek School District. The district annexed the Pilot Knob districts in 1956. During that year, Del Valle Junior-Senior High School, serving grades seven through ten, opened. Grade 11 appeared in 1957, and grade 12 appeared in 1958. In 1958 the sports stadium, Cardinal Field, opened followed by a field house in 1962. A building program passed in the 1959-1960 school year lead to the opening of a new junior high school. The Elroy Common School District merged into the Colorado common school district in 1961, forming the largest common school district in the state. In April 1963 the school district changed its name to the Del Valle Independent #910. In September 1966 the district annexed the Creedmoor Common School District #41. In 1967 the Hornsby-Dunlap Common School District was annexed.

Smith Elementary School and a new middle school opened on the site of the Del Valle High School campus in 1972. In the 1981-1982 school year Hillcrest Elementary opened. Baty opened as a result of a bond program in 1984. When the City of Austin wanted to build Austin-Bergstrom International Airport in an area that housed Del Valle's high school and three elementary schools, voters approved a $38.1 million bond to build the schools in a new location. Baty Elementary, Hillcrest Elementary, Popham Elementary, and Del Valle High School moved.

Superintendent Bernard Blanchard retired in 2011.

== Schools ==
=== High School (Grades 9–12) ===
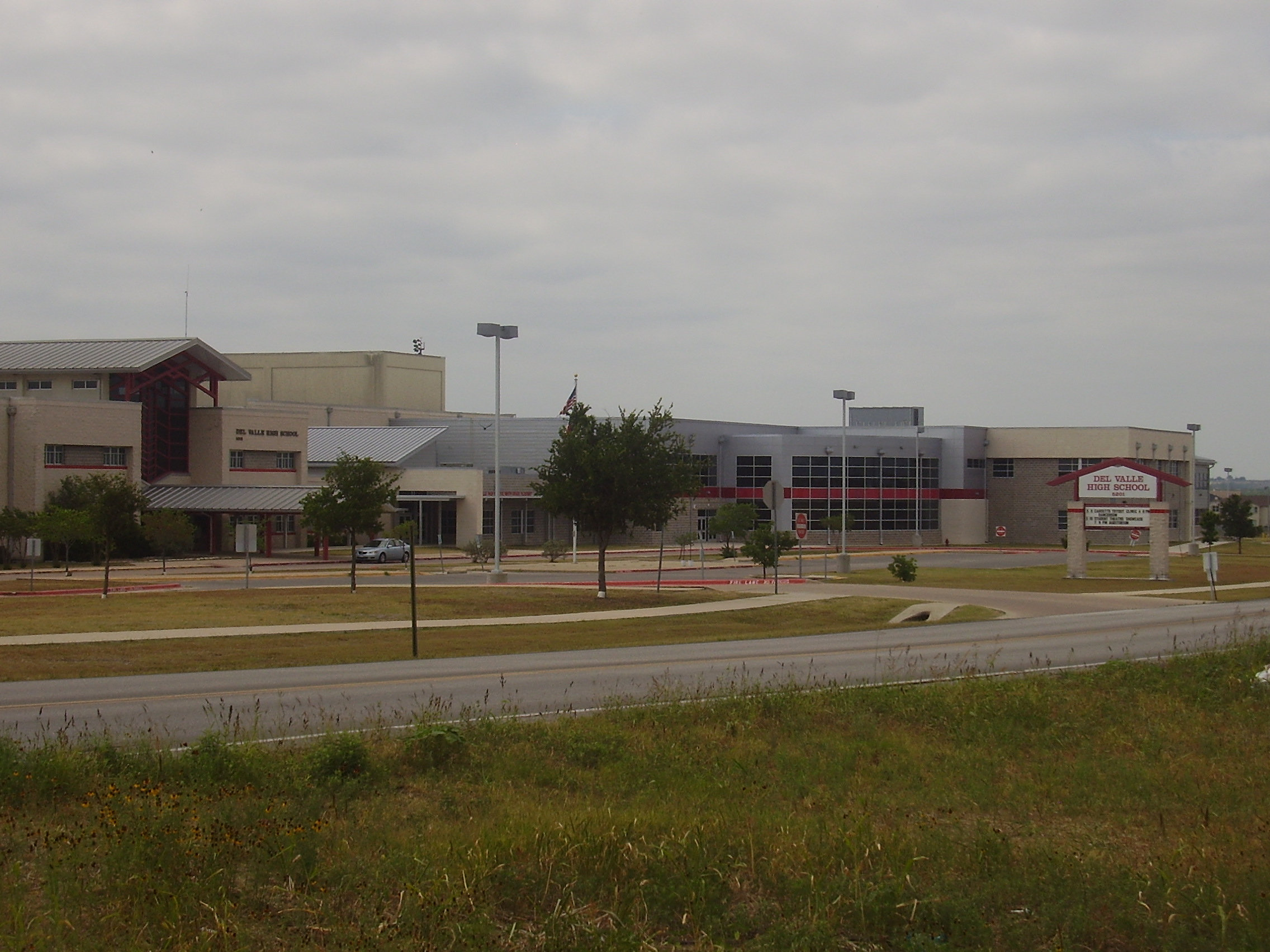
Del Valle High School

- Del Valle High School
- North Del Valle High School (opening fall 2027)
- Del Valle Opportunity Center

=== Middle Schools (Grades 6–8) ===
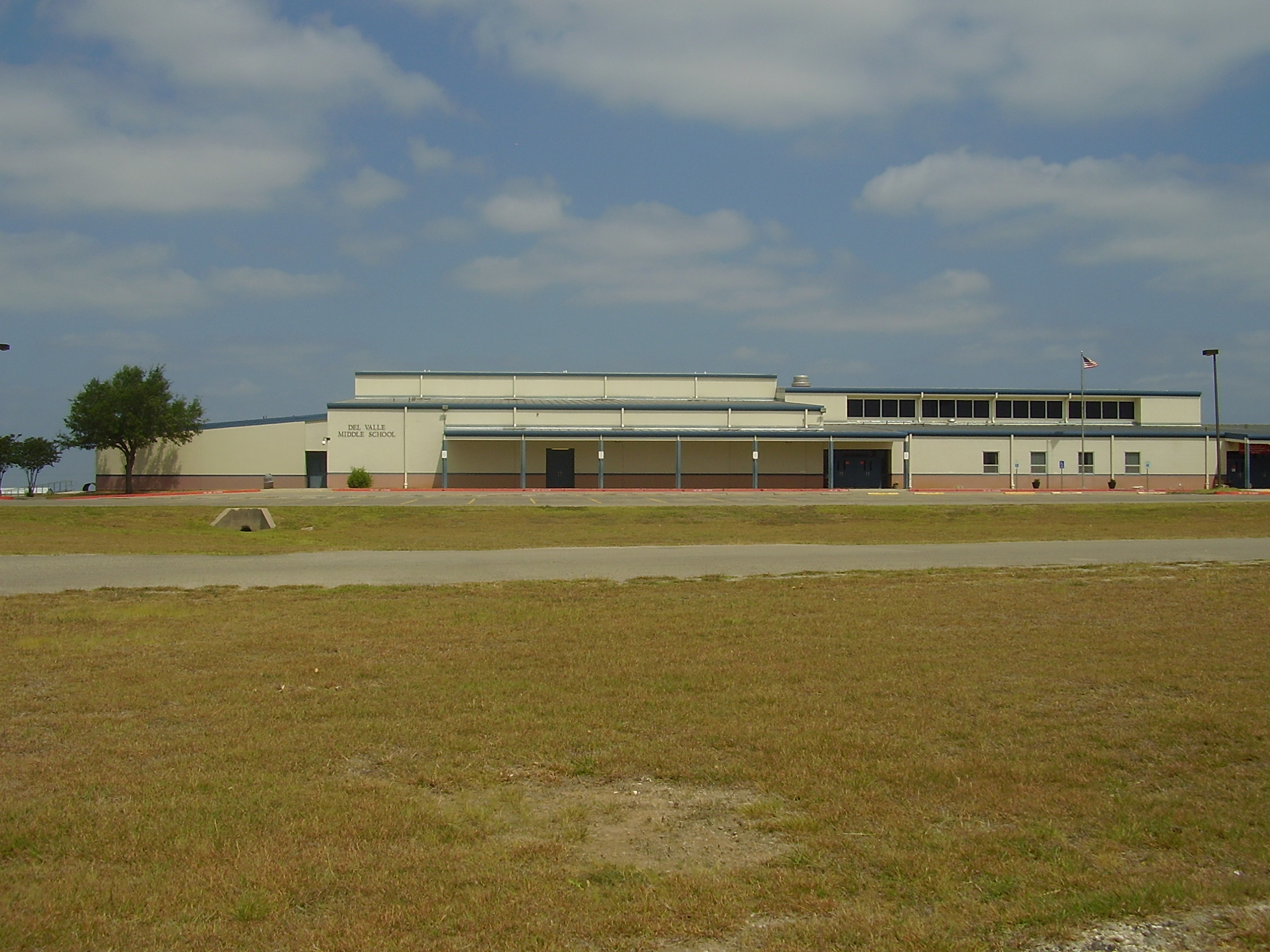
Del Valle Middle School

- Del Valle Middle School
- John P. Ojeda Middle School
- Dailey Middle School

=== Elementary Schools (Grades PK–5) ===
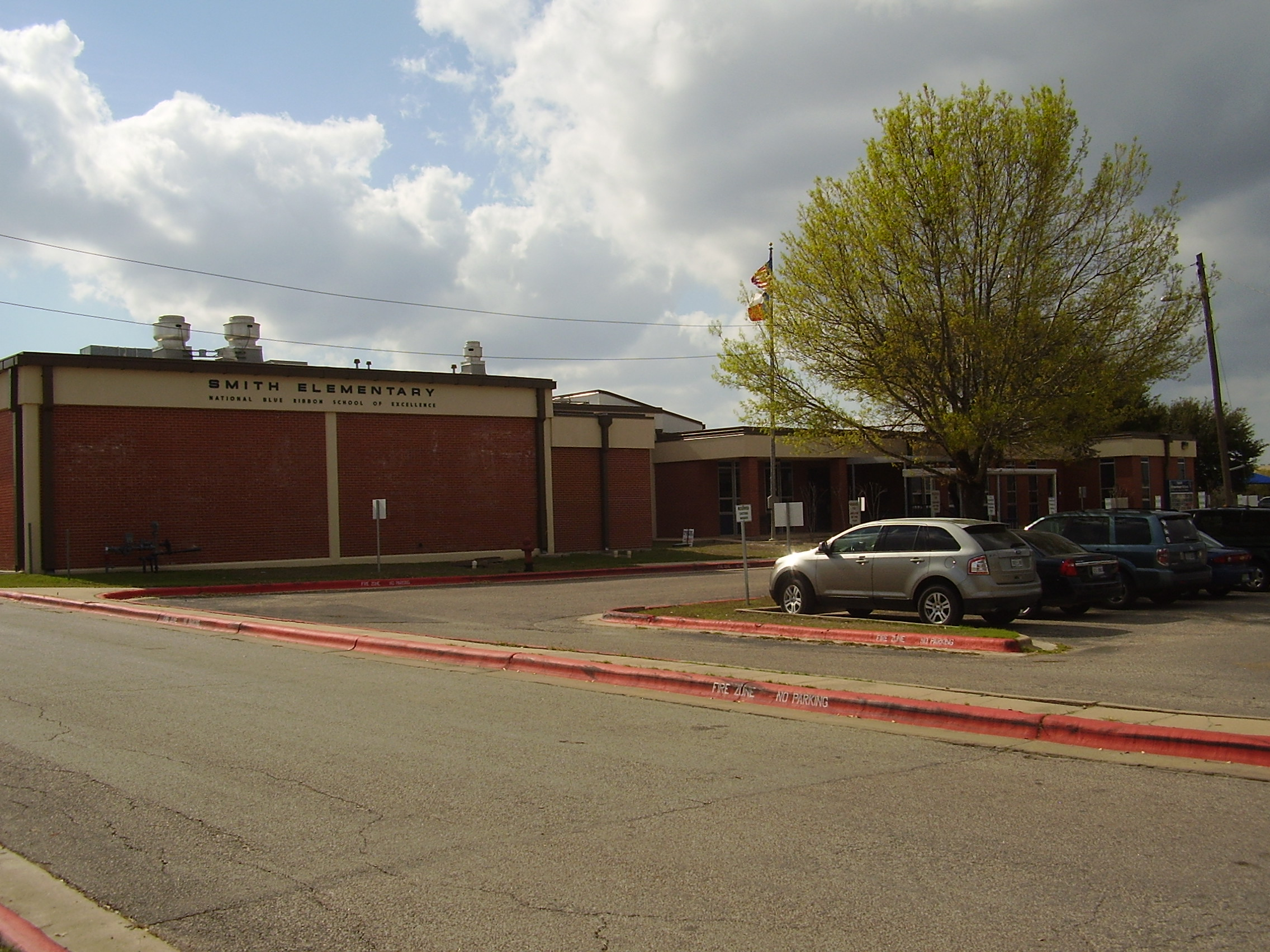
Smith Elementary School

- Baty Elementary National Blue Ribbon School in 2000–01
- Creedmoor Elementary
- Del Valle Elementary
- Hillcrest Elementary National Blue Ribbon School in 1998–99
- Hornsby-Dunlap Elementary
- Newton Collins Elementary School
- Popham Elementary
- Smith Elementary National Blue Ribbon School in 1996–97
- Joseph Gilbert Elementary School

== Other facilities ==
Its administrative headquarters is in the Edward A. Neal Administration Building, named for a superintendent who held the post for 27 years until 1998.

== Statistics ==
2020-2021 Information
| | DVISD | Statewide |
|---|---|---|
| Beginning teachers' salary | $49,000 | $48,996 |
| Average teachers' number of years experience | 8 | 11.1 |
| Economically disadvantaged students | 85.82% | 60.6% |
| Students with limited English proficiency | 40.12% | 19.5% |
| Student / teacher ratio | 22.1 | 15.1 |

Demographics:

- African American: 8.36%
- Hispanic: 85.25%
- White: 4.13%
- Native American: 0.11%
- Asian/Pacific Islander: 0.74%
- Two or more races: 1.40%
