= Texas State Highway 71 =

State highway in Texas

State Highway 71
- SH 71 highlighted in red

Route information
- Maintained by TxDOT
- Length: 253.199 mi (407.484 km)
- Existed: 1923–present

Major junctions
- West end: US 87 / US 377 near Brady
- US 281 near Marble Falls; US 290 in Austin; I-35 in Austin; US 183 in Austin; SH 21 / SH 95 in Bastrop; US 77 at La Grange; US 90 in Columbus; I-10 in Columbus; US 90 Alt. at Altair; Future I-69 / US 59 at El Campo
- East end: SH 35 at Blessing

Location
- Country: United States
- State: Texas
- Counties: McCulloch, Mason, San Saba, Llano, Burnet, Blanco, Travis, Bastrop, Fayette, Colorado, Wharton, Matagorda

Highway system
- Highways in Texas; Interstate; US; State; Former; Toll; Loops; Spurs; FM/RM; Park; Rec
← SH 70	→ SH 72

State Highway 71 (SH 71) is a Texas state highway that runs 253 miles (407 km). The western terminus is at US 87 and US 377 south of Brady and its eastern terminus is at SH 35 near Blessing. This highway is designated the "10th Mountain Division Highway" from SH 95 to Interstate 35.

== History ==
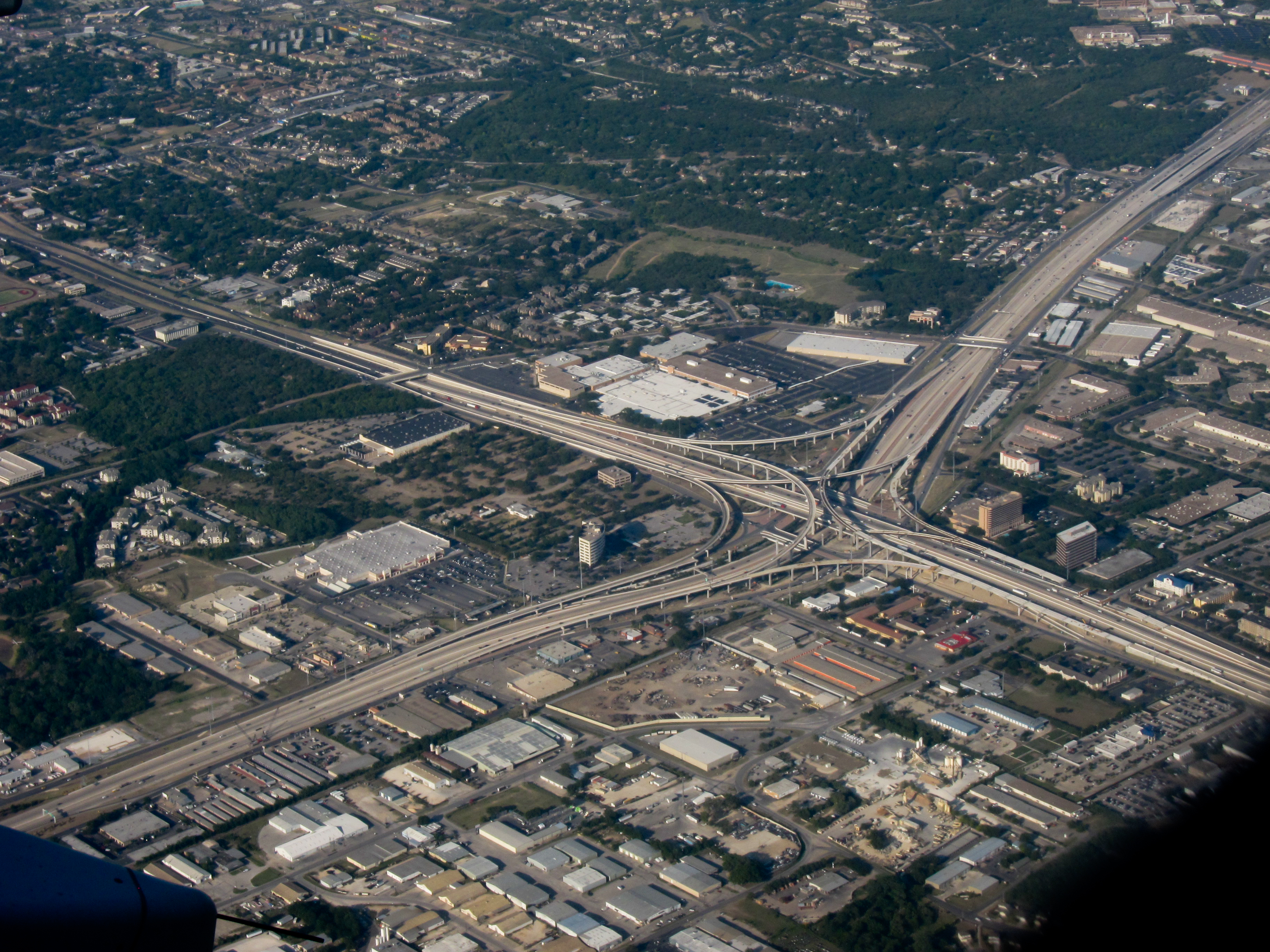
The intersection between IH35 and Texas State Highway 71

SH 71 was originally designated on August 21, 1923 from Austin to Columbus, replacing SH 3D and the western half of SH 3A. On June 8, 1925, SH 71 was extended to Midfield, though this was not effective until 1926. On March 19, 1928, it was extended south to its current end. On June 21, 1938, SH 71 Spur was designated in Columbus. In 1935, U.S. Highway 290 was codesignated along the stretch from Austin to Bastrop, dropping SH 71 from this section completely on September 26, 1939. SH 71 Spur was renumbered as Spur 52. On May 23, 1951, this section was restored when US 290 was rerouted farther north. On October 24, 1955, SH 71 was signed, but not designated along Ranch to Market Road 93 to Llano. On October 31, 1965, the highway was extended to its current designation over the cancelled Ranch to Market Road 93 and Ranch to Market Road 734. On February 16, 1982, SH 71 was relocated in Columbus.

=== Austin and Bastrop ===
Through Austin, SH 71 is known as Ben White Boulevard and is one of Austin's newest freeways. Sections have opened regularly since 1996, when the first section west of Interstate 35 was opened. A five-level stack was completed at Interstate 35 in December 2011, and the freeway east of Interstate 35 to Austin-Bergstrom International Airport was completed in 2014. Construction commenced in 2015 east of US 183 (Bastrop Freeway) where a section of SH 71 to the SH 130 tollway has been converted into a tollway with a two lane bridge crossing SH 130.

Major displacements of commercial properties were required to build the Austin expansions. Most of the freeway had a 150-foot (46 m) wide right-of-way which was expanded to over 300 feet (91 m), and the western segment, which opened in 1998, was built on an 80-foot (24 m) right-of-way. The section at the western end required many more business displacements. The new freeway features depressed sections, elevated sections, and partial stack interchanges.

An interchange over Ross Road and Kellam Road southeast of Austin was completed circa mid-2024.

== Business routes ==
SH 71 has two business routes.

=== La Grange business loop ===

Business State Highway 71-E (Bus. SH 71-E) is a business loop that runs through La Grange. The road was designated in 1991 upon completion of a bypass around the city.

=== Columbus business loop ===

Business State Highway 71-F (Bus. SH 71-F) is a business loop that runs through Columbus. The city was bypassed on February 16, 1982, and the original route was designated as Loop 329. The route received the Bus. SH 71-F designation on June 21, 1990.

== Major intersections ==
County	Location	mi	km	Destinations	Notes
McCulloch	Brady			US 87 / US 377 – Brady, Mason	
McCulloch				FM 2309 north – Brady	
McCulloch				FM 1851 – Voca	
McCulloch				FM 1851 south – Voca	
McCulloch				FM 3293 west	
Mason	Fredonia			RM 386 south – Mason	
San Saba	No major junctions				
Mason	Pontotoc			RM 501 east – Cherokee	
Llano				SH 29 west – Mason	West end of SH 29 overlap
Llano	Llano			SH 16 north / SH 29 east – San Saba, Burnet	East end of SH 29 overlap; west end of SH 16 overlap
Llano	Llano			RM 152 west – Castell	
Llano	Llano			SH 16 south – Fredericksburg	East end of SH 16 overlap
Llano				FM 2333 east – Sunrise Beach Village	
Llano				RM 962 east – Round Mountain	
Llano				RM 2831 north	
Llano				RM 2147 east – Horseshoe Bay, Cottonwood Shores	
Burnet	Marble Falls			US 281 – Marble Falls, Burnet, Johnson City, San Antonio	Cloverleaf Interchange
Burnet				Spur 191 north – Spicewood	
Blanco	No major junctions				
Travis				RM 2322 north (Pace Bend Road) – Briarcliff, Pace Bend State Park	
Travis	Bee Cave			RM 3238 west (Hamilton Pool Road)	
Travis	Bee Cave			RM 620 north – Lakeway, Round Rock	
Travis	Bee Cave			RM 2244 east – West Lake Hills	
Travis	Austin			US 290 west – Johnson City, Fredericksburg	West end of US 290 overlap
Travis	Austin	See US 290			
Travis	Austin			I-35 / US 290 east – Waco, San Antonio	East end of US 290 overlap
Travis	Austin			Woodward Street / Todd Lane / Burleson Road	
Travis	Austin			Montopolis Drive	
Travis	Austin			Riverside Drive	
Travis	Austin			US 183 (Bastrop Highway) / 183 Toll Road (Bergstrom Expressway) – Lampasas, Lockhart	East end of freeway
Travis	Austin			Spirit of Texas Drive – Austin-Bergstrom International Airport	Interchange; no direct westbound exit and eastbound entrance (signed at Presidential Boulevard / Cardinal Loop)
Travis	Austin			Cardinal Loop / Presidential Boulevard – Austin-Bergstrom International Airport, Del Valle	Interchange; West end of 71 Toll Lanes
Travis	Austin			FM 973 – Manor, Mustang Ridge	Interchange; no direct westbound exit and eastbound entrance (signed at SH 130)
Travis	Austin			SH 45 Toll north / SH 130 Toll north – Waco	Interchange; eastbound exit and westbound entrance; SH 130 exit 449
Travis	Austin			SH 45 Toll / SH 130 Toll – Bastrop, San Antonio	SH 130 exit 449; East end of 71 Toll Lanes
Travis	Del Valle			Ross Road / Kellam Road	Interchange
Bastrop				FM 1209 – Webberville	
Bastrop				SH 21 west – San Marcos	Interchange; west end of SH 21 overlap
Bastrop				FM 20 south to FM 969 north – Lockhart, Webberville	West end of expressway
Bastrop	Bastrop			SH 304 south to FM 969 – Gonzalez	
Bastrop	Bastrop			Loop 150 east / Hasler Boulevard / Childers Drive – Bastrop, Bastrop State Park	East end of expressway
Bastrop	Bastrop			SH 21 east / SH 95 north – Bryan, Elgin	Interchange; east end of SH 21 overlap; west end of SH 95 overlap
Bastrop	Bastrop			Loop 150 west / Tahitian Drive – Bastrop, Bastrop State Park	Interchange
Bastrop				SH 95 south / FM 153 east / Loop 230 east – Smithville, Flatonia, Winchester	Interchange; east end of SH 95 overlap
Bastrop	Smithville			Colorado Street (County Road 319)	Interchange
Bastrop	Smithville			Loop 230 west – Smithville	Interchange
Fayette				Loop 543 east – West Point	
Fayette				FM 154 – West Point, Muldoon	
Fayette				Loop 543 west – West Point	
Fayette				Loop 220 east – Plum	
Fayette				Loop 220 west – Plum	
Fayette				Bus. SH 71 east – La Grange	West end of freeway
Fayette	La Grange			US 77 / Von Minden Street – Giddings, Schulenburg	Access to St Mark's Medical Center
Fayette	La Grange			SH 159 – Bellville, La Grange	
Fayette				Bus. SH 71 west – La Grange	East end of freeway
Fayette				FM 955 north – Fayetteville	
Fayette	Ellinger			FM 2503 north	
Colorado	Hillcrest			FM 1890 west (Shaws Bend Road)	
Colorado				Bus. SH 71 east – Columbus	Interchange
Colorado	Columbus			Round House Road	Interchange
Colorado	Columbus			US 90 – Weimar, Sealy	Interchange; westbound exit and eastbound entrance
Colorado				I-10 west – San Antonio	Interchange; west end of I-10 overlap, exit 693 eastbound, 695 westbound; no eastbound entrance
Colorado	Columbus			I-10 east / Bus. SH 71 west – Houston, Columbus	East end of I-10 overlap, exit 696
Colorado	Altair			US 90 Alt. – Hallettsville, Eagle Lake	
Colorado				FM 1693 west	
Colorado	Garwood			FM 950 east – Matthews	
Colorado				FM 333 west	
Wharton				FM 1160 south – Louise	
Wharton				FM 961 east – Wharton	
Wharton				FM 2546 – Jones Creek	
Wharton				FM 2546 north – Jones Creek	
Wharton				FM 1300 west	
Wharton	El Campo			FM 2765 (Loop Street)	
Wharton	El Campo			FM 653 south (Wharton Street)	
Wharton	El Campo			I-69 BL / Bus. US 59 – Pierce, Louise	
Wharton	El Campo			FM 1163 south (2nd Street)	
Wharton	El Campo			FM 653 north (Wharton Street)	
Wharton	El Campo			Future I-69 / US 59 – Houston, Wharton, Ganado	I-69/US 59 exit 61; U.S. 59 is the future Interstate 69
Wharton				FM 2674 south	
Wharton	Danevang			FM 441 north – Hillje	
Matagorda				FM 1468 east – Markham	
Matagorda	Midfield			SH 111 west / FM 2431 east – Edna, Markham	
Matagorda				FM 456 east	
Matagorda	Blessing			SH 35 – Bay City, Palacios	
1.000 mi = 1.609 km; 1.000 km = 0.621 mi: Concurrency terminus; Incomplete access
