= Texas State Highway 95 =

State highway in Texas

State Highway 95
- SH 95 highlighted in red

Route information
- Maintained by TxDOT
- Length: 122.355 mi (196.911 km)
- Existed: 1924–present

Major junctions
- South end: US 77 Alt. in Yoakum
- US 90 Alt. in Shiner; US 90 in Flatonia; I-10 in Flatonia; SH 21 / SH 71 in Bastrop; US 290 in Elgin; US 79 in Taylor; SH 29 near Circleville
- North end: Future I-14 / US 190 / SH 36 in Temple

Location
- Country: United States
- State: Texas
- Counties: Lavaca, Fayette, Bastrop, Travis, Williamson, Bell

Highway system
- Highways in Texas; Interstate; US; State; Former; Toll; Loops; Spurs; FM/RM; Park; Rec
← SH 94	→ US 96

State Highway 95 (SH 95) is a state highway which connects the cities of Yoakum and Temple in the U.S. state of Texas.

== Route description ==
The southern terminus of SH 95 is in Lavaca County at US 77 Alt. along the northern edge of Yoakum. The roadway continues south from this point as FM 3475. The highway runs north to Shiner, where it intersects US 90 Alt. It runs roughly parallel to the Union Pacific rail line through Moulton and into Fayette County. In Flatonia, SH 95 crosses both US 90 and I-10 before briefly turning to the northwest. It resumes a more northward course before entering Bastrop County. In the northern part of Smithville, SH 95 begins a concurrency with westbound SH 71. The two routes travel together to the northwest, reaching Bastrop; here, SH 71 splits from SH 95 and continues west toward Austin, and northbound SH 21 is briefly concurrent with SH 95 through the center of the city. After SH 21 separates and continues east toward Bryan–College Station, SH 95 resumes a northerly trajectory, passing to the west of Camp Swift before meeting and sharing a brief overlap with US 290 in Elgin. After separating from US 290, SH 95 again runs north parallel to the Union Pacific rail line, briefly crossing into Travis County before entering Williamson County, reaching a junction with US 79 in Taylor. Continuing north, it first passes through Granger and then through Bartlett at the Bell County line. SH 95 then turns to the northeast and passes through Holland. The route then reaches Temple, where the SH 95 designation ends at an interchange with US 190/SH 36 (future I-14). The roadway continues north as Loop 363.

The portion of SH 95 from SH 71 to US 290 has been designated part of the 10th Mountain Division Highway.

== History ==
The route was designated on April 21, 1924 along a route from Taylor to Elgin. On April 6, 1932, it was extended south to Hochheim, replacing SH 109, and extended north to Temple, replacing part of SH 2B. On July 15, 1935, the section from Elgin to Flatonia was cancelled as it was not fully built, creating a gap. On February 21, 1937, the section from Elgin to Bastrop was restored, partially closing the gap. On February 9, 1939, the road had already been improved from Elgin to Sayersville and this completed the connection to Bastrop. The Works Progress Administration funded the $109,000 relief project. On September 26, 1939, the section from Yoakum to Hochheim was transferred to SH 111, and the section from Flatonia to Yoakum was renumbered to SH 297, eliminating the gap. On November 20, 1939, before signage was changed, SH 297 was changed back to SH 95, creating a gap between Flatonia and Bastrop. On May 29, 1941, the section of SH 95 from Flatonia north to Smithville was restored as a temporary route and SH 95 was concurrent with SH 71 between Bastrop and Smithville, closing the gap. The temporary route later became the permanent route because TxDOT could not construct a more direct route for SH 95 from Bastrop to Flatonia. On November 24, 1978, the section from SH 53 to SH 36 in Temple was cancelled and transferred to Loop 363.

== Major intersections ==
County	Location	mi	km	Destinations	Notes
Lavaca	Yoakum			US 77 Alt. / FM 3475 south – Victoria, Hallettsville, Yoakum	
Lavaca				FM 958 west – Midway	
Lavaca	Shiner			FM 966 south	
Lavaca	Shiner			US 90 Alt. – Gonzales, Hallettsville	
Lavaca				FM 3435 west – Gonzales	
Lavaca				FM 1891 east	
Lavaca				FM 340 east – Witting	
Lavaca	Moulton			FM 532 east – Komensky, Moravia	south end of FM 532 overlap
Lavaca	Moulton			FM 532 west – Gonzales, Waelder	north end of FM 532 overlap
Fayette	Flatonia			US 90 west – Waelder	South end of US 90 concurrency
Fayette	Flatonia			US 90 east – Schulenburg	North end of US 90 concurrency
Fayette	Flatonia			I-10 to FM 609 – San Antonio, Houston	I-10 exit 661
Fayette				FM 154 north – Muldoon	
Fayette				FM 1115 south – Waelder	
Fayette	Cistern			FM 2237 east – Muldoon	
Bastrop	Smithville			FM 535 west – Rosanky	
Bastrop	Smithville			FM 2571 west – Upton	
Bastrop	Smithville			Loop 230 east (Third Street) – La Grange	south end of Loop 230 overlap
Bastrop	Smithville			SH 71 east / FM 153 east – Winchester, Buescher State Park	north end of Loop 230 overlap; south end of SH 71 overlap; interchange
Bastrop	Bastrop			Loop 150 west to SH 21 east – Caldwell, Bastrop State Park	
Bastrop	Bastrop			SH 21 west / SH 71 west – Austin, San Marcos	South end of SH 21 concurrency; north end of SH 71 concurrency
Bastrop	Bastrop			SH 21 east / Loop 150 – Caldwell, Bryan, Bastrop State Park	North end of SH 21 concurrency
Bastrop				FM 1441 east – Lake Bastrop	
Bastrop				FM 2336 north – McDade	
Bastrop	Elgin			US 290 east – Giddings	South end of US 290 concurrency
Bastrop	Elgin			Loop 109 north to FM 1704 – Historical District	
Bastrop	Elgin			US 290 west – Austin	North end of US 290 concurrency
Bastrop	Elgin			FM 1100 west / North Avenue C – Kimbro, Elgin	south end of FM 1100 overlap
Bastrop	Elgin			FM 1100 east (North Main Street)	south end of FM 1100 overlap
Bastrop	Elgin			Loop 109 south – Historical District	
Travis	No major junctions				
Williamson				Spur 277 – Coupland	
Williamson				FM 1466 east – Coupland	
Williamson				FM 1660 west – Rices Crossing	
Williamson	Taylor			US 79 (truck route) / Rices Crossing Road – Granger, Austin, Rockdale	South end of US 79 Business concurrency
Williamson	Taylor			FM 112 east (Walnut Street)	
Williamson	Taylor			Bus. US 79 north (4th Street)	North end of US 79 Business concurrency
Williamson	Taylor			FM 397 (truck route) – Elgin	
Williamson	Circleville			FM 1331 east – Granger Lake	
Williamson				SH 29 west – Georgetown	
Williamson	Granger			FM 971 west – Weir	south end of FM 971 overlap
Williamson	Granger			FM 971 east – Granger Dam	north end of FM 971 overlap
Williamson				FM 972 west – Walburg	
Bell	Bartlett			FM 487 (East Clark Street) – Schwertner, Jarrell, Davilla	
Bell				FM 2268 east – Rogers, Davilla	South end of FM 2268 concurrency
Bell	Holland			FM 1123 north / FM 2268 west – Salado	North end of FM 2268 concurrency
Bell	Academy			FM 436 (East Main Street) – Belton, Heidenheimer	
Bell				FM 93 – Belton, Heidenheimer	interchange
Bell	Temple			US 190 / SH 36 / Loop 363 – Waco, Cameron	interchange, future I-14
1.000 mi = 1.609 km; 1.000 km = 0.621 mi: Concurrency terminus
