= Texas State Highway 21 =

State highway in Texas

State Highway 21

Route information
- Maintained by TxDOT
- Length: 312.50 mi (502.92 km)
- Existed: April 4, 1917–present

Major junctions
- West end: I-35 at San Marcos
- US 183 / SH 130 Toll in Mustang Ridge; US 290 in Paige; US 77 near Lincoln; US 190 / SH 6 in Bryan; I-45 / US 190 in Madisonville; US 287 in Crockett; US 69 in Alto; Future I-69 / US 59 in Nacogdoches; US 96 in San Augustine
- East end: LA 6 near Milam

Location
- Country: United States
- State: Texas
- Counties: Hays, Caldwell, Bastrop, Lee, Burleson, Brazos, Madison, Houston, Cherokee, Nacogdoches, San Augustine, Sabine

Highway system
- Highways in Texas; Interstate; US; State; Former; Toll; Loops; Spurs; FM/RM; Park; Rec
← SH 20	→ SH 22

State Highway 21 (SH 21) runs from the Texas-Louisiana boundary east of San Augustine to San Marcos in east and central Texas. SH 21 mostly follows the alignment of the Old San Antonio Road and the El Camino Real, except for the portion between Midway and Bryan, where the Old San Antonio Road took a more northerly route, and SH 21 follows a more direct route. That section of the Old San Antonio Road is served by Texas State Highway OSR.

== History ==
Historic SH 21

SH 21 was one of the original 25 routes proposed in Texas on June 21, 1917, along a route from the Louisiana state line east of St. Augustine to Gonzales, overlaid on top of the Gonzales-St. Augustine Highway. There was proposed extension southward to Karnes City on February 18, 1918. On July 16, 1923, the terminus was shortened to Giddings, with the section south of there being cancelled. A spur, SH 21 Spur, was designated on March 19, 1930, from Milam to Hemphill. On August 1, 1930, this spur became part of SH 87. On September 29, 1933, SH 21 was extended to Lockhart. On July 15, 1935, the section from Giddings to Lockhart was cancelled, and SH 21 was rerouted though Lincoln, replacing part of SH OSR, and followed SH 44 to Giddings. On October 21, 1936, SH 21 Spur to Chireno was added. On May 18, 1937, the spur in Chireno became a loop, SH 21 Loop. On February 21, 1938, another SH 21 Spur to McMahan's Chapel was added. On April 19, 1938, the section of SH 21 from Lincoln to Giddings was cancelled, and SH 21 was extended to Bastrop, replacing part of SH OSR. On September 26, 1939, the section from Paige to Bastrop was cancelled, as it was already part of US 290. The spur and loop became Loop 34 (Chireno) and Spur 35 (McMahan's Chapel). On August 2, 1943, the western terminus had been extended to end in San Marcos, along its current route, replacing part of SH OSR.

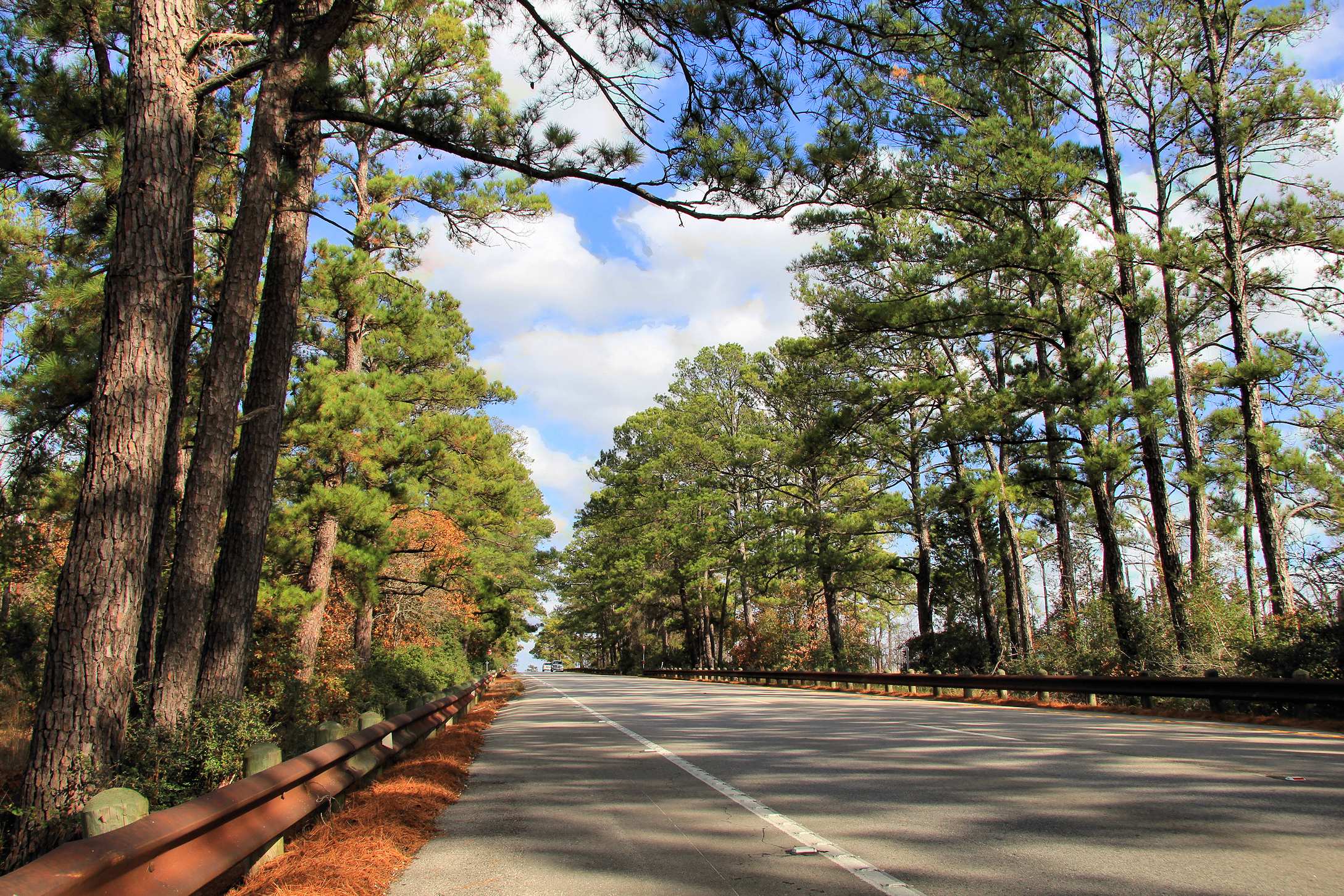
Westbound Highway 21 through the "Lost Pines" north of Bastrop.

On June 24, 2010, the SH 21 designation was extended along SH 80 and SH 142 to end at I-35.

== Major intersections ==
County	Location	mi	km	Exit	Destinations	Notes
Hays	San Marcos	0.0– 0.2	0.0– 0.32		I-35 / SH 80 north – Wimberley, San Antonio, Austin	I-35 exit 205; west end of SH 80 overlap
Hays	San Marcos	0.9	1.4		SH 80 south / SH 142 east – Lockhart, Luling, Martindale	Interchange; east end of SH 80 / SH 142 overlap
Caldwell–Hays county line		6.4	10.3		FM 1966 east – Maxwell	
Caldwell–Hays county line		7.8	12.6		RM 150 west – Kyle	
Hays	Uhland	9.3	15.0		FM 2720 south to SH 142	
Caldwell	Niederwald	13.9	22.4		FM 2001 east – Lockhart	West end of FM 2001 overlap
Caldwell–Hays county line	Niederwald	15.3	24.6		FM 2001 west – Buda	East end of FM 2001 overlap
Caldwell	Mustang Ridge	18.0– 18.2	29.0– 29.3		SH 130 Toll / US 183 – Waco, Austin, Lockhart, Seguin, San Antonio	SH 130 exit 461/463
Caldwell	Mustang Ridge	19.0	30.6		FM 1854 south – Lytton Springs	
Bastrop	Saint Mary's Colony	25.5	41.0		FM 812 – Elroy, Red Rock	Interchange
Bastrop	Cedar Creek	30.3	48.8		FM 535 – Rosanky, Rockne	
Bastrop		34.5	55.5		FM 1209 north	
Bastrop		35.8	57.6		SH 71 west – Austin	Interchange; west end of SH 71 overlap
Bastrop	Bastrop	37.8	60.8		FM 20 south / FM 969 west – Lockhart	interchange; west end of freeway
Bastrop	Bastrop	39.1	62.9		SH 304 south / FM 969 west	
Bastrop	Bastrop	40.0	64.4		Loop 150 east / Hasler Boulevard / Childers Street	Interchange; east end of freeway
Bastrop	Bastrop	42.1	67.8		SH 71 east / SH 95 south – Smithville	Interchange; east end of SH 71 overlap; west end of SH 95 overlap
Bastrop	Bastrop	42.8	68.9		SH 95 north / Loop 150 west – Elgin	east end of SH 95 overlap; west end of Loop 150 overlap
Bastrop	Bastrop	43.5	70.0		Loop 150 east – Smithville	East end of Loop 150 overlap
Bastrop	Bastrop	43.6	70.2		PR 1A – Bastrop State Park	
Bastrop	Circle D-KC Estates	48.6	78.2		FM 1441 west – Lake Bastrop, Lost Pines Scout Reservation	
Bastrop	Paige	55.2– 55.4	88.8– 89.2		US 290 – Austin, Paige, Giddings	Interchange
Lee		62.7	100.9		FM 2440 east – Giddings	
Lee	Lincoln	67.4	108.5		FM 1624 – Fedor, Giddings	
Lee		69.5	111.8		US 77 – Giddings, Lexington, Rockdale	Interchange
Lee		74.1	119.3		FM 3403 west	
Lee	Old Dime Box	77.8	125.2		FM 141 south – Dime Box, Nails Creek State Park	
Burleson		82.4	132.6		FM 696 north – Lexington	
Burleson	San Antonio Prairie	84.8	136.5		FM 60 south – Deanville, Lake Somerville State Park	
Burleson		88.2	141.9		FM 908 north – Rockdale	
Burleson	Caldwell	91.4	147.1		FM 975 (Banks Street)	
Burleson	Caldwell	92.4	148.7		Loop 83 (Main Street) – Business District	
Burleson	Caldwell	92.6	149.0		SH 36 – Cameron, Milano, Somerville, Brenham	
Burleson		94.0	151.3		FM 2000	
Burleson		98.3	158.2		FM 1362 north	West end of FM 1362 overlap
Burleson	Cooks Point	99.0	159.3		FM 1362 south	East end of FM 1362 overlap
Burleson		103.5	166.6		FM 50 south – Independence	West end of FM 50 overlap
Brazos		105.0	169.0		FM 50 north – Mumford	East end of FM 50 overlap
Brazos	Bryan	106.5	171.4		SH OSR east	
Brazos	Bryan	108.8	175.1		SH 47 south – College Station, Texas A&M University	Interchange
Brazos	Bryan	112.9– 113.0	181.7– 181.9		FM 2818 (North Harvey Mitchell Parkway) – College Station	Interchange
Brazos	Bryan	114.2	183.8		FM 158 east (West William J. Bryan Parkway) / FM 1687 west (Sandy Point Road) – Huntsville, Lake Bryan, Hamilton Unit	
Brazos	Bryan	115.5	185.9		Bus. SH 6-R (Texas Avenue) – Hearne, College Station, Downtown Bryan	
Brazos	Bryan	115.8	186.4		FM 974 east (Tabor Road) – Tabor	
Brazos	Bryan	116.4– 116.5	187.3– 187.5		US 190 west / SH 6 – Waco, Houston	Interchange; west end of US 190 overlap
Brazos	Wixon Valley	121.3	195.2		FM 2776 north	
Brazos	Kurten	124.2	199.9		Bus. SH 21-H east – Kurten	
Brazos	Kurten	124.6	200.5		FM 2038 – Kurten	
Brazos	Kurten	125.5	202.0		Bus. SH 21-H west – Kurten	
Brazos		130.7	210.3		FM 974 west – Edge	
Madison		134.2	216.0		FM 2865 north	
Madison	North Zulch	137.9	221.9		FM 39 – Normangee, Iola	Interchange
Madison	North Zulch	138.1	222.3		Loop 160 east (Trinity Avenue)	
Madison	North Zulch	138.6	223.1		Loop 160 west (Fifth Street)	
Madison	Cottonwood	146.1	235.1		FM 1372 west	
Madison		148.5	239.0		FM 1452 west	West end of FM 1452 overlap
Madison		148.8	239.5		FM 1452 east	East end of FM 1452 overlap
Madison	Madisonville	150.4	242.0		FM 978 west (Woodrow Street)	
Madison	Madisonville	150.7	242.5		Spur 174 south (Madison Street)	
Madison	Madisonville	150.9	242.9		SH 75 (May Street) to I-45 north / SH 90 – Buffalo, Huntsville, Navasota	
Madison	Madisonville	152.9– 153.0	246.1– 246.2		I-45 / US 190 east – Dallas, Houston	I-45 exit 142; east end of US 190 overlap
Madison	Jenkins	154.5	248.6		FM 2346 north	
Madison		155.6	250.4		FM 1428 east	
Madison		160.8	258.8		FM 2158 south	
Madison	Midway	161.8	260.4		SH OSR west – Normangee	
Madison	Midway	161.9	260.6		FM 247 south – Ferguson Unit	
Madison	Midway	162.2	261.0		FM 2548 east / FM 3060 north	
Madison	Antioch	166.1	267.3		FM 2548 west	
Houston	Sand Ridge	169.8	273.3		FM 2498 north	
Houston	Mapleton	171.4	275.8		FM 3275 south	
Houston	Austonio	175.1	281.8		FM 1280 west	west end of FM 1280 overlap
Houston	Austonio	175.2	282.0		FM 1280 east	east end of FM 1280 overlap
Houston	Cooper	180.0	289.7		FM 2967 north – Porter Springs	
Houston		187.9	302.4		SH 7 west – Centerville	West end of SH 7 overlap
Houston	Crockett	188.3	303.0		Loop 304 (truck route)	
Houston	Crockett	189.0	304.2		FM 229 to FM 2076	
Houston	Crockett	189.6– 189.7	305.1– 305.3		US 287 / SH 7 east / SH 19	East end of SH 7 overlap; traffic circle around Houston County Courthouse
Houston	Crockett	189.8	305.5		FM 2022 north (North Sixth Street)	
Houston	Crockett	191.0	307.4		Loop 304 (truck route)	
Houston		193.6	311.6		FM 3187 south	
Houston	Belott	201.4	324.1		FM 1733	
Houston		208.7	335.9		FM 227 east – Ratcliff	West end of FM 227 overlap
Houston		209.3	336.8		FM 227 west – Grapeland, Augusta	East end of FM 227 overlap
Houston	Weches	210.8	339.2		PR 44 – Mission Tejas State Park	
Cherokee	Weeping Mary	220.2	354.4		FM 220 south – Cold Springs	
Cherokee	Alto	223.0	358.9		SH 294 west (Elkhart Street) – Elkhart	
Cherokee	Alto	223.2	359.2		US 69 (Marcus Street) – Rusk, Lufkin	
Cherokee	Linwood	228.0	366.9		FM 241 north – Salem	
Cherokee	Linwood	228.2	367.3		FM 2708 south	
Nacogdoches	Douglass	234.7	377.7		FM 225 south	West end of FM 225 overlap
Nacogdoches	Douglass	234.7	377.7		FM 225 north – Cushing	East end of FM 225 overlap
Nacogdoches	Nacogdoches	247.3	398.0		US 59 north / Loop 224 east (Stallings Drive) to SH 7 Bus. SH 21-P east	Interchange; western end of US 59/Loop 224 concurrency; western terminus of Bus. SH 21-P
Nacogdoches	Nacogdoches	248.2– 248.6	399.4– 400.1		FM 225 (Durst Street)	Interchange
Nacogdoches	Nacogdoches	249.1– 249.6	400.9– 401.7		SH 7 west (South Fredonia Street) / Bus. SH 7-N east – Crockett	Interchange; western end of SH 7 concurrency; western terminus of Bus. SH 7-N
Nacogdoches	Nacogdoches	249.6	401.7		US 59 south	Future interchange; future eastern end of US 59 concurrency
Nacogdoches	Nacogdoches	250.0– 250.4	402.3– 403.0	59S	US 59 south / Bus. US 59-F north (South Street) – Lufkin	Interchange; eastern end of US 59 concurrency; southern terminus of Bus. US 59-F; signed as exit 59S eastbound only
Nacogdoches	Nacogdoches	250.9	403.8		FM 2863 south (New Press Road) / Hunter Street	Northern terminus of FM 2863
Nacogdoches	Nacogdoches	251.8	405.2		FM 1275 north (South University Drive)	Western end of FM 1275 concurrency
Nacogdoches	Nacogdoches	251.9	405.4		FM 1275 south (South Rayburn Drive)	Eastern end of FM 1275 concurrency
Nacogdoches	Nacogdoches	252.5	406.4		FM 2259 (Woden Road)	
Nacogdoches	Nacogdoches	253.7	408.3		Loop 224 west / SH 7 east Bus. SH 21-P west (Main Street)	Interchange; eastern end of SH 7/Loop 224 concurrency; eastern terminus of Bus. SH 21-P
Nacogdoches	Oak Ridge	256.9	413.4		FM 226 south – Woden, Etoile	
Nacogdoches	Melrose	260.7	419.6		FM 3276 north	
Nacogdoches	Chireno	269.5	433.7		FM 95 / Loop 34 south – Martinsville, Chireno	
Nacogdoches	Chireno	270.2	434.8		Loop 34 south – Chireno	
San Augustine		273.0	439.4		FM 1196 south	
San Augustine	Denning	276.3	444.7		FM 354 north	
San Augustine		277.8	447.1		FM 3409 south	
San Augustine		281.2	452.5		Spur 85 south	
San Augustine	San Augustine	283.5	456.2		US 96 – Center, Jasper	
San Augustine	San Augustine	283.9	456.9		Loop 547 east (West Columbia Street)	
San Augustine	San Augustine	284.3	457.5		SH 147 south (South Broadway Street) – El Camino Real Tourist Center (Mission Dolores)	West end of SH 147 overlap; west end of Loop 547 east overlap (eastbound only)
San Augustine	San Augustine	284.3	457.5		FM 3230 north (South Harrison Street) / Loop 547	east end of Loop 547 east overlap (eastbound only)
San Augustine	San Augustine	284.5	457.9		FM 2213 south (South Liberty Street)	
San Augustine	San Augustine	284.9	458.5		SH 147 north (South Clark Street)	East end of SH 147 overlap
San Augustine	San Augustine	284.9	458.5		Loop 547 west (East Columbia Street) to SH 147 north	
San Augustine	San Augustine	285.4	459.3		FM 3483 south	
San Augustine		289.1	465.3		FM 3153 east	
San Augustine	Fords Corner	291.7	469.4		FM 1 south – Hemphill, Pineland, Bronson	
Sabine		293.6	472.5		Spur 35 south – McMahan Chapel	
Sabine		295.1	474.9		FM 3448 north	
Sabine	Geneva	297.4	478.6		FM 330 north (Geneva Sexton Road)	
Sabine		300.8	484.1		SH 103 west – Lufkin	
Sabine	Milam	303.6	488.6		SH 87 – Red Hill Lake, Center, Hemphill, Patricia Huffman Smith NASA Museum	
Sabine		307.5	494.9		FM 3121 south – Indian Mounds Wilderness	
Sabine		312.5	502.9		LA 6 east – Many	Louisiana state line (bridge over Sabine River (Toledo Bend Reservoir))
1.000 mi = 1.609 km; 1.000 km = 0.621 mi

== Business routes ==
SH 21 has two business routes.

=== Kurten business route ===
Business State Highway 21-H
- Location: Kurten
- Length: 1.362 mi (2.192 km)
- Existed: 2002–present

Business State Highway 21-H (Bus. SH 21-H) is a 1.362-mile (2.192 km) long business route that runs through Kurten in central Texas. The route was formed from an old section of SH 21 on February 28, 2002, when SH 21 proper was moved onto a new bypass around Kurten.

=== Nacogdoches business route ===
Business State Highway 21-P
- Location: Nacogdoches
- Length: 4.170 mi (6.711 km)
- Existed: 2018–present

Business State Highway 21-P (Bus. SH 21-P) is a 4.170-mile (6.711 km) long business route that runs through Nacogdoches in eastern Texas. The route was formed from an old section of SH 21, when the main highway was re-routed onto Loop 224 and US 59 on October 25, 2018.

Major intersections

The entire route is in Nacogdoches, Nacogdoches County.

mi	km	Destinations	Notes
0.000	0.000	US 59 / SH 21 east / Loop 224 (Stallings Drive) SH 21 west (Douglass Road)	Western terminus; road continues as SH 21 west
1.341	2.158	FM 225 west (Durst Street)	Eastern terminus of FM 225
1.803	2.902	Bus. US 59 / Bus. SH 7-N west (North Street/South Street)	Western end of Bus. SH 7-N concurrency
2.375	3.822	FM 1275 (University Drive)	
2.487	4.002	FM 2259 south (Shawnee Street)	Northern terminus of FM 2259
3.043	4.897	Bus. SH 7-N east (Center Road)	Eastern end of Bus. SH 7-N concurrency
4.170	6.711	SH 7 (Stallings Drive) / SH 21 west / Loop 224 SH 21 east (Main Street)	Eastern terminus; road continues as SH 21 east
1.000 mi = 1.609 km; 1.000 km = 0.621 mi: Concurrency terminus
