= Texas Park Road 1 =

State road in Texas, United States

PR 1
- PR 1 highlighted in red

Route information
- Maintained by TxDOT
- Length: 33.591 mi (54.059 km)
- Existed: June 22, 1937–present

Major junctions
- West end: SH 21 in Bastrop
- East end: FM 153 near Smithville

Location
- Country: United States
- State: Texas
- Counties: Bastrop

Highway system
- Highways in Texas; Interstate; US; State; Former; Toll; Loops; Spurs; FM/RM; Park; Rec
← RR 1	→ I-2

Park Road 1 (PR 1) is a Park Road located in Bastrop and Buescher state parks, in the central region of the U.S. state of Texas. The highway is approximately 33.6 miles (54.1 km) long, and passes through mainly rural park land. PR 1 also includes most main roads in the two parks. Because of this, the highway has been divided into five different routes; they are PR 1A, 1B, 1C, 1D, and 1E. PR 1C makes up most of the route, while three of the segments are less than a mile long. The route was first drafted by the Civilian Conservation Corps (CCC) in 1933, as a scenic drive between the two parks. It was designated in 1937 as one of the state's originally designated Park Roads and has been extended and altered multiple times since.

== Route description ==
Park Road 1 is divided into five suffixed routes, numbered from 1A to 1E. The longest of the five routes is PR 1C, at approximately 11.2 miles (18.0 km) long, and the shortest of the routes is PR 1D, at just barely over 0.1 miles (0.16 km) long. Roads 1A, 1B, and 1D are located completely within Bastrop State Park. Park Road 1E is the only one of the routes to be located completely within Buescher State Park, and PR 1C is the only route that traveling between both parks. The Texas Department of Transportation (TxDOT) publishes yearly reports of highway's annual average daily traffic (AADT), with counts usually taken near intersections. PR 1 generally has a low AADT, with most areas of the highway having a daily count below 100 vehicles. The highest traveled point along the road is at PR 1C's intersection with County Route 174 (CR 174), with an average count of 690 vehicles. The least traveled point on the roadway is just east of the CR 174 intersection, with a daily count of just 30 vehicles.

=== Park Road 1A ===
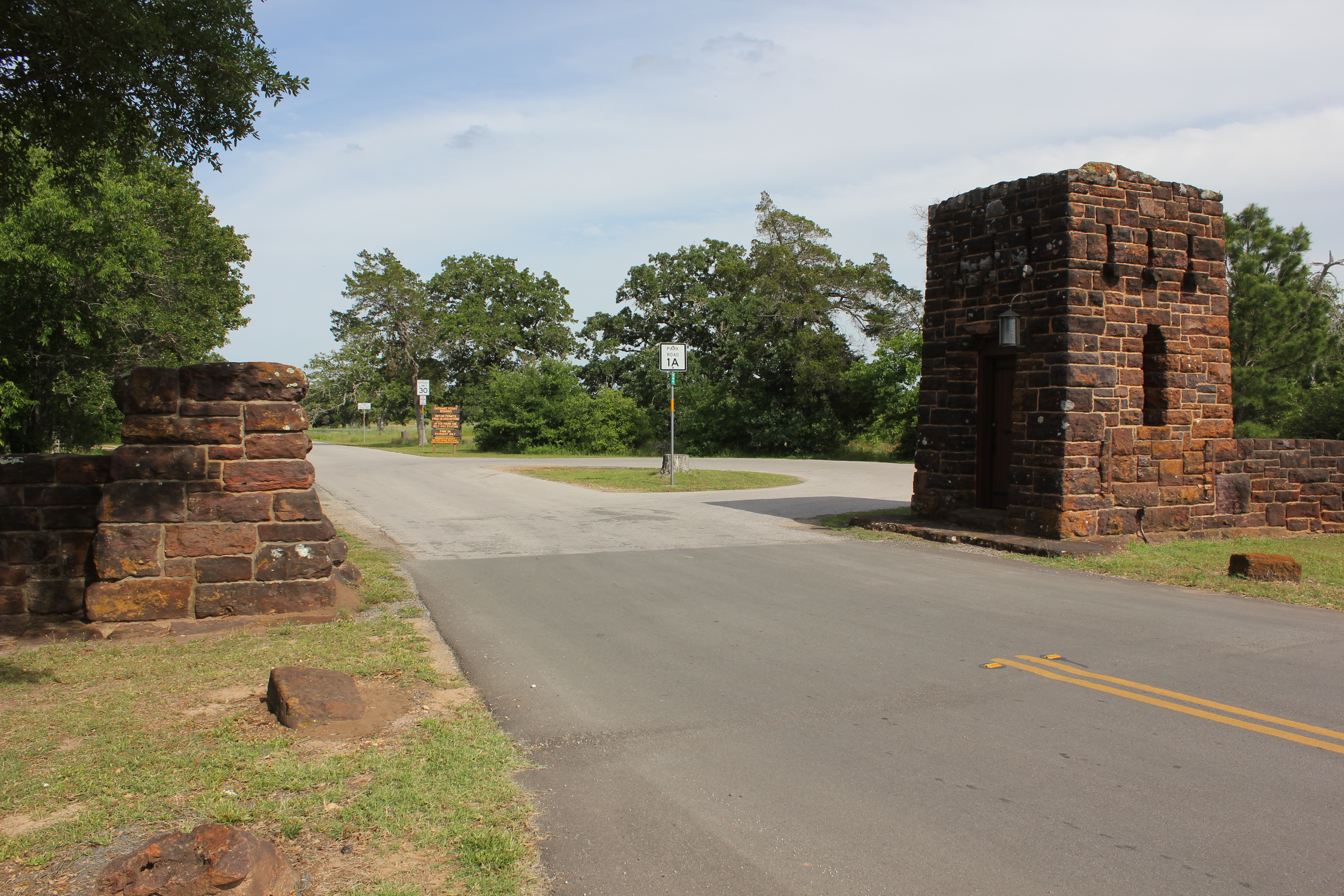
Park Road 1A at the entrance to Bastrop State Park

PR 1A
- Location: Bastrop State Park
- Length: 3.988 mi (6.418 km)

Park Road 1A (PR 1A) is a major routing of PR 1 located nearly entirely within Bastrop State Park. The highway forms a loop around the center of the park, and connects other portions of PR 1 to State Highway 21 (SH 21). The highway begins at an intersection with SH 21, on the border of the state park. The highway proceeds southward, before entering the Bastrop Golf Course, and proceeding. The road travels through the golf course, passing the park's entrance facility, before it intersects PR 1D. The highway bends southward, passing a small camping area before it bends eastward. The roadway continues, passing south of the Deer Run and Piney Hill camping areas before passing north of the Creekside Camping area and continuing eastward. The highway bends northward, providing access to the large Copperas Creek camping area and continuing northward past a small parking area. It continues north, providing access to several of the park's hiking trails and a scenic overlook, before it bends westward. After a short distance, the road turns southwest, passing Bastrop State Park Lake, before it turns southward. It travels past the park's barracks and several large camping areas, before reaching its terminus, an intersection that closes the loop.

The old earthen dam that impounded Bastrop State Park Lake failed on May 25, 2015, due to heavy rains in the Bastrop area. The volume of rain was more than the spillway could handle. The dam overtopped and then failed. Park Road 1A went across the top of the dam, and the road is now closed at that point.

=== Park Road 1B ===
PR 1B
- Location: Bastrop State Park
- Length: 0.483 mi (777 m)

Park Road 1B (PR 1B) is a short routing of PR 1 located entirely in Bastrop State Park. The road provides access to the park's cabins. The highway begins at an intersection with PR 1A on the southwestern edge of Bastrop State Park Lake. The roadway proceeds northwestward a short distance, before bending southward along a small creek. The route passes the creek, and bends northeastward. The highway intersects several small roads leading to the park cabins, including a road leading to the Lost Pines Lodge. The route bends eastward, traveling to its northern terminus, a dead end spot at one of the cabins.

=== Park Road 1C ===
PR 1C
- Location: Bastrop State Park–Buescher State Park
- Length: 11.196 mi (18.018 km)

Park Road 1C (PR 1C) is the longest segment of PR 1, connecting Bastrop and Buescher state parks through an area known as the "Lost Pines". The highway begins at an intersection with PR 1A in the central area of Bastrop State Park. It bends northeastward while providing access to the Old Road Bed trail, which leads back to PR 1A. The road continues eastward, bending several times before intersecting Harmon Road, which connects the route to State Highway 71/95. The roadway intersects several small roads as it proceeds southeastward. Before crossing over Alum Creek, the road intersects County Road 190 (CR 190), which leads to the northern portions of the park. The highway proceeds eastward into the "Lost Pines" portion of the park, where it occasionally intersects private roads. The roadway bends southward before passing the western edge of the Stengl Lost Pines Biological Station. The road continues south into Buescher State Park. The highway runs eastward, intersecting CR 185 while traveling through densely forested area. The roadway bends southward and travels parallel to the park's eastern edge. The road passes a large park complex before bending eastward. PR 1C continues southward, intersecting PR 1E while traveling along the coast of Buescher Lake, towards the park entrance. The route passes the park ranger station before reaching its terminus, an intersection with Farm to Market Road 153 (FM 153) on the park border.

=== Park Road 1D ===
PR 1D
- Location: Bastrop State Park
- Length: 0.106 mi (171 m)

Park Road 1D (PR 1D) is the shortest of the five sections of PR 1. The route serves as a driveway for the park's dining hall. The highway begins at an intersection with PR 1A near the beginning of PR 1A's large in-park loop. The highway proceeds eastward, passing a small clump of trees to the north, and a small dirt road running parallel to the route on the south. The route makes a 180 degree bend past the dining hall, and passes north of the small clump of trees. The route then reaches its northern terminus, an intersection with PR 1A.

=== Park Road 1E ===
PR 1E
- Location: Buescher State Park
- Length: 0.948 mi (1,526 m)

Park Road 1E (PR 1E) is located completely within Buescher State Park. The highway serves the park's cabins and campgrounds. The road begins at an intersection with PR 1C at the entrance to the Lakeview Camping Area, north of Park Lake. The route bends southeast, passing a small parking lot for the Buescher Hiking Trail, and the trail itself, which leads to primitive walk-in campgrounds. The roadway passes the park amphitheater, and intersects a small road that leads to the Cozy Circle Camping Area. The highway bends in a slight backwards S-shape, intersecting several roads that lead to park cabins, picnic areas, and other sites. The road continues southward, reaching an intersection with PR 1C at the park headquarters, where it terminates.

== History ==
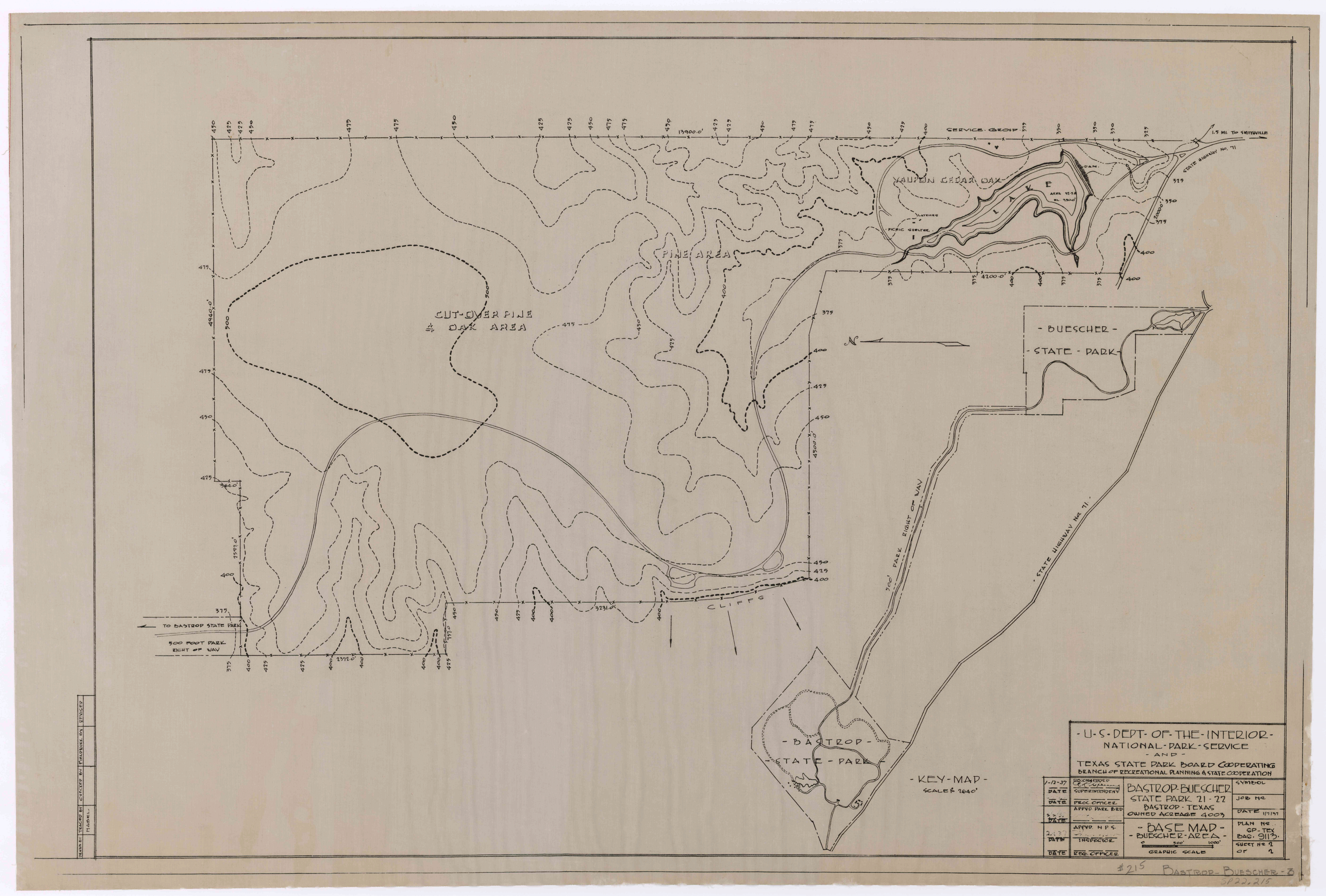
A topographic map of Buescher State Park, drawn out by the Civilian Conservation Corps while planning the park. The constructed route of PR 1 closely followed the planning.

Beginning in 1933 during the Great Depression, the Civilian Conservation Corps (CCC) worked on constructing Bastrop and Buescher state parks, including work on a scenic route to connect the two parks. Work on the parks continued through 1939, when construction on both areas, including all roads within the park and the drive connecting them were completed. Park Road 1 was first designated on June 22, 1937, as one of the original eight Park Roads in the state highway system. It was originally designated from an intersection with U.S. Route 290 passing around and through Bastrop State Park. On May 9, 1940, PR 1 was extended past Buescher State Park, to SH 71, and had several smaller roads in Bastrop and Buescher state parks added. On May 21, 1940, the route was minorly rerouted. On May 23, 1951, U.S. Route 290 was rerouted away from Bastrop, with Texas State Highway 21 redesignated to its location. On March 1, 1963, the portion of PR 1 from SH 71 to the south entrance to Buescher State Park was cancelled, with the new southern terminus becoming FM 153.

== Major junctions ==
Park Road 1A

This entire highway is located in Bastrop State Park, Bastrop County.

mi	km	Destinations	Notes
0.000	0.000	SH 21 (Chestnut Street) – Bastrop	Western terminus
0.674	1.085	PR 1A	Beginning of in-park loop
0.703	1.131	PR 1D	Southern terminus of PR 1D
2.814	4.529	PR 1C	Western terminus of PR 1C
3.452	5.555	PR 1B	Southern terminus of PR 1B
3.943	6.346	PR 1D	Northern terminus of PR 1D
3.988	6.418	PR 1A	Eastern terminus. End of in-park loop
1.000 mi = 1.609 km; 1.000 km = 0.621 mi

Park Road 1B

This entire highway is located in Bastrop State Park, Bastrop County.

mi	km	Destinations	Notes
0.000	0.000	PR 1A	Southern terminus
0.297	0.478	Lost Pines Lodge	Only access to Lost Pines Lodge
0.483	0.777	Dead end	Northern terminus
1.000 mi = 1.609 km; 1.000 km = 0.621 mi

Park Road 1D

This entire highway is located in Bastrop State Park, Bastrop County.

mi	km	Destinations	Notes
0.000	0.000	PR 1A	Western terminus
1.346	2.166	CR 180	Northern terminus of CR 180
3.489	5.615	CR 190	
5.082	8.179	CR 154	
6.711	10.800	CR 901	Western terminus of CR 901
7.509	12.085	CR 185	Southern terminus of CR 185
9.197	14.801	CR 174	Northern terminus of CR 174
10.262	16.515	PR 1E	Northern terminus of PR 1E
11.153	17.949	PR 1E	Southern terminus of PR 1E
11.196	18.018	FM 153 – Smithville	Southern terminus
1.000 mi = 1.609 km; 1.000 km = 0.621 mi

Park Road 1D

This entire highway is located in Bastrop State Park, Bastrop County.

mi	km	Destinations	Notes
0.000	0.000	PR 1A	Southern terminus
0.106	0.171	PR 1A	Northern terminus
1.000 mi = 1.609 km; 1.000 km = 0.621 mi

Park Road 1E

This entire highway is in Buescher State Park, Bastrop County. This entire highway is located in Bastrop State Park, Bastrop County.

mi	km	Destinations	Notes
0.000	0.000	PR 1C	Southern terminus
0.948	1.526	PR 1C	Northern terminus
1.000 mi = 1.609 km; 1.000 km = 0.621 mi
