= William Longley =

William or Bill Longley may refer to:

- Bill Longley (gunfighter) (1851–1878), gunfighter and outlaw
- William Harding Longley (1881–1937), American botanist
- Bill Longley (speedway rider) (1911–2005), Australian motorcycle speedway rider
