= Texas State Highway Loop 150 =

State highway loop in Bastrop, Texas, United States

State Highway Loop 150
- Loop 150 highlighted in red

Route information
- Maintained by TxDOT
- Length: 2.409 mi (3.877 km)
- Existed: 1960–present

Major junctions
- West end: SH 21 / SH 71 in Bastrop
- SH 21 / SH 95 in Bastrop
- East end: SH 71 / SH 95 in Bastrop

Location
- Country: United States
- State: Texas

Highway system
- Highways in Texas; Interstate; US; State; Former; Toll; Loops; Spurs; FM/RM; Park; Rec
← Loop 149	→ Loop 151

Loop 150 is a 2.409-mile (3.877 km) loop route in the city of Bastrop, Texas, United States. Loop 150 follows the route of old alignment of SH 71 through Bastrop. The route of SH 71 changed when the state built a bypass around Bastrop. Loop 150 leaves SH 71 on the west side of town and rejoins SH 71 on the east side, crossing the Colorado River. The historic Colorado River Bridge at Bastrop is part of Loop 150.

== Route description ==
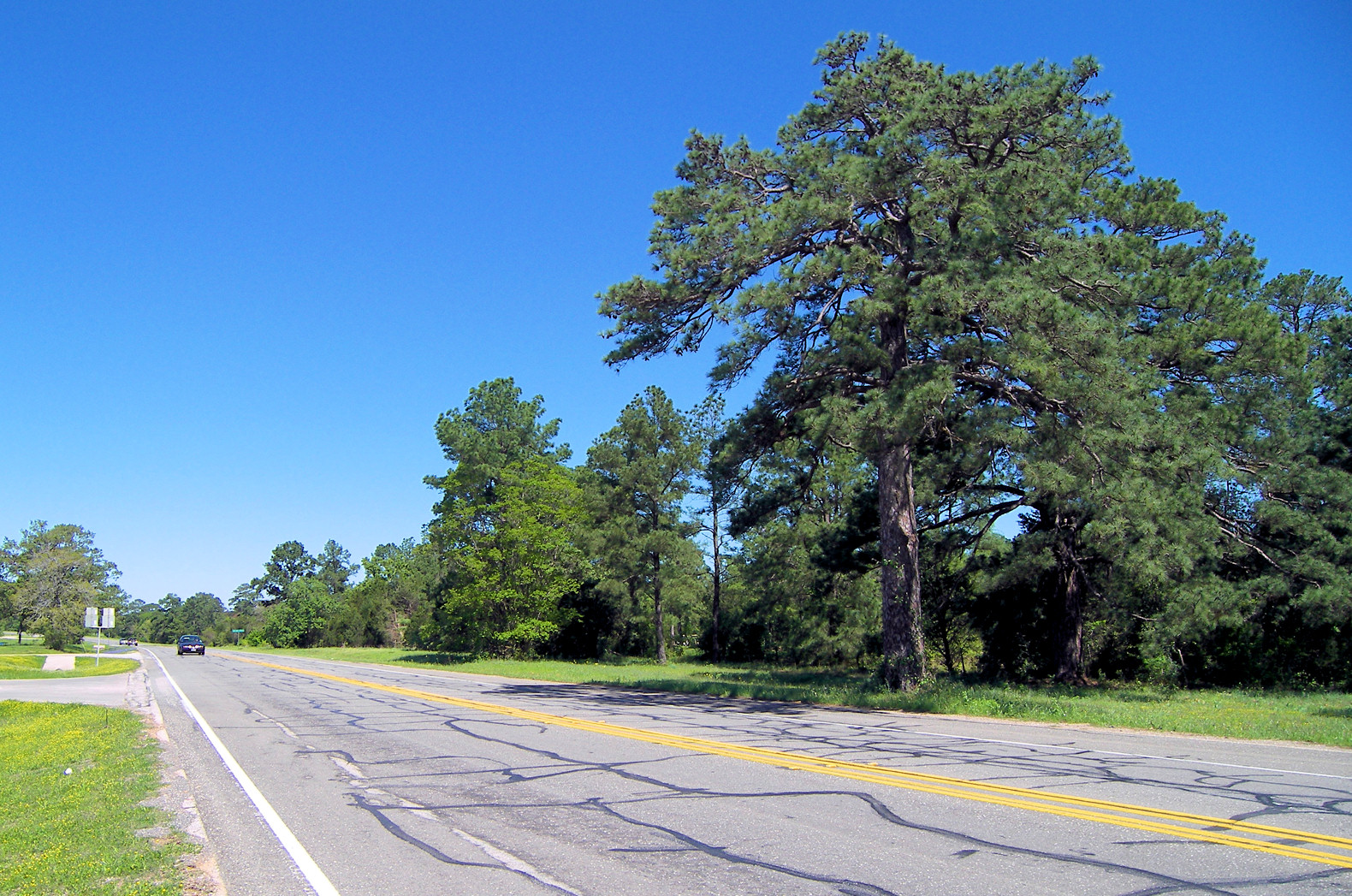
Looking west on Loop 150 from near its eastern terminus

Loop 150 begins on the west side of Bastrop at a diamond interchange with SH 21 and SH 71. The loop heads northeast from the interchange to a crossing of the Colorado River. After the river crossing, the road heads east along Chestnut Street through Bastrop. Loop 150 continues to the east through the city to an intersection with SH 21 and 95. SH 21 enters the intersection from the south concurrent with SH 95 and begins to run concurrently with Loop 150 as the two head to the east. As the loop begins to curve back towards the southeast, SH 21 leaves the concurrency to the northeast. Access to nearby Bastrop State Park is provided by an intersection with Park Road 1 just east of the SH 21 intersection. Loop 150 continues to the southeast to its endpoint at a concurrent SH 71 and SH 95.

== History ==
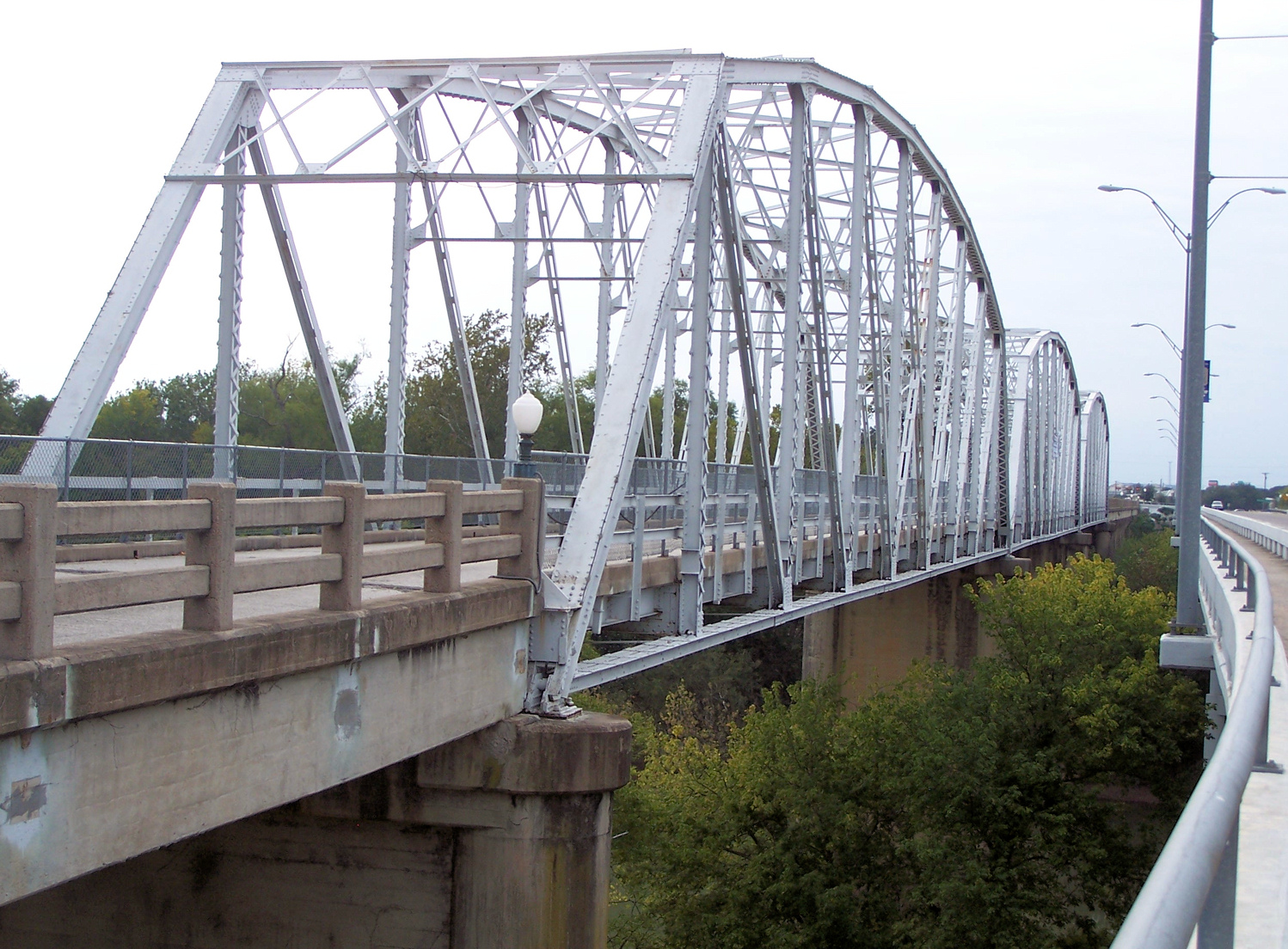
Colorado River bridge used by Loop 150 until the 1990s

The routing of the roadway had been proposed as early as 1919 as SH 3A. In 1924, the historic Colorado River Bridge at Bastrop was completed to provide access to both sides of the Colorado River. By 1926, the designation had been changed to SH 71.

The number was originally used for Spur 150 from SH 283 westward to Truscott. On May 23, 1951, this became part of the new FM 1756. On November 24, 1959, Loop 150 was designated to follow the old alignment of SH 71 in Bastrop following the completion of the new segment of SH 71 to the south. Loop 150 used the Colorado River Bridge at Bastrop until the completion of a new parallel bridge in 1993. The old bridge was closed to traffic and is still in use as a pedestrian bridge. The overpasses at the western terminus with SH 71 were completed over Loop 150 in 2005.

In 2013, the Texas Legislature, designated the new bridge on Loop 150 across the Colorado River as the Chief Petty Officer (SOC) Stephen "Matt" Mills Bridge. Mills was a highly decorated United States Navy SEAL, who died while conducting special operations in Afghanistan on August 6, 2011.

== Junction list ==
The entire route is in Bastrop, Bastrop County.

mi	km	Destinations	Notes
0.000	0.000	SH 21 / SH 71	Western terminus
		SH 21 / SH 95	Western end of SH 21 concurrency
		SH 21	Eastern end of SH 21 concurrency
		PR 1 – Bastrop State Park	
2.409	3.877	SH 71 / SH 95	Eastern terminus
1.000 mi = 1.609 km; 1.000 km = 0.621 mi: Concurrency terminus

== See also ==
- List of state highway loops in Texas
