= Gabbie Nolen =

American country music singer-songwriter (born 1982)

- Born: July 7, 1982 (age 42)
- Origin: La Grange, Texas
- Genres: Country
- Occupation: Singer
- Years active: 1991–present
- Labels: Republic/Universal Records
- Website: Official website

Gabbie Nolen (born July 7, 1982, in La Grange, Texas) is an American country music singer-songwriter. Nolen was signed by Republic/Universal Records in November 2001 after successfully recording and releasing several independent singles, including "Wait a Minute," written by Rodney Crowell and Hank Devito. Her first single for the label, "Almost There," was released in March 2002 (written by Dickie Kaiser, M. Jason Greene, and Les Rawlins). The song peaked at number 45 on the Billboard Hot Country Singles & Tracks chart. It went to number one on the Billboard Top Country Singles Sales Chart in November 2002. Republic/Universal closed its country division in late 2002.

== Singles ==
Year	Single	Peak positions
Year	Single	US Country
2002	"Almost There"	45
