= Utley, Texas =

- Unincorporated community
- Location within Texas Location within the United States
- Coordinates: 30°10′55″N 97°25′15″W
- Country: United States
- State: Texas
- County: Bastrop
- Elevation: 417 ft (127 m)
- Time zone: UTC-6 (Central (CST))
  - Summer (DST): UTC-5 (CDT)
- Area codes: 512 & 737
- GNIS feature ID: 1379199

Utley (/ˈjuːtli/ YOOT-lee) is an unincorporated community in Bastrop County, Texas, United States. According to the Handbook of Texas, the community had a population of 50 in 2000. It is located within the Greater Austin metropolitan area.

== History ==
Today, the community is now a put-in-point for canoeists on the Colorado River. The Wilbarger family also named a nearby creek.

== Geography ==
Utley is located along Farm to Market Road 969, 7 mi (11 km) northwest of Bastrop, 26 mi (42 km) southeast of Austin, and 13 mi (21 km) south of Elgin in western Bastrop County.

== Education ==
Utley had a school for Hispanic students in the 1930s. The west half of Utley today is served by the Elgin Independent School District and the east half by the Bastrop Independent School District.
