= La Grange High School =

Coordinates: 29.9021°N 96.8652°W

Location
- 820 S Vail; La Grange, Texas 78945; United States

Information
- School type: Public high school
- School district: La Grange Independent School District
- Principal: John Pineda
- Staff: 50.75 (FTE)
- Grades: 9–12
- Enrollment: 607 (2025–2026)
- Student to teacher ratio: 12.06
- Colors: Purple & Gold
- Athletics conference: UIL Class 4A
- Mascot: Leopards/Lady Leps
- Yearbook: Leopard Spots
- Website: La Grange High School

La Grange High School is a public high school in La Grange, Texas, United States. It is a part of the La Grange Independent School District located in central Fayette County. In 2015, the school was rated "Met Standard" by the Texas Education Agency.

== Athletics ==
La Grange High School is classified as a 4A school by the UIL. The La Grange Leopards compete in these sports.

Cross Country, Volleyball, Football, Basketball, Powerlifting, Swimming, Soccer, Golf, Tennis, Track, Softball & Baseball

=== State titles ===
- Football
  - 1975 (2A), 2000 (3A/D2)
- Baseball
  - 1973 (3A), 2001 (3A), 2004 (3A), 2013 (3A)
- Girls Softball
  - 2005 (3A), 2014 (3A), 2016 (4A)
- Boys Track
  - 1923 (B)

== Notable athletes ==
- Johnnie Johnson – Member of the Los Angeles Rams from 1980 to 1988. Played Safety for the University of Texas from 1976 to 1979. Unanimous All-America selection at defensive back in 1978 and 1979. Elected to College Football Hall of Fame on in 2007.
- Homer Bailey – Cincinnati Reds Pitcher (Drafted #7 in 2004 MLB Draft, pitched two no-hitters.)
- Jeff Kelly – Linebacker for Kansas State University. Member of the Atlanta Falcons from 1999–2002 and Toronto Argonauts in 2006.
- Trey Supak – Pitcher for Pittsburgh Pirates. (Drafted #73 Overall in The 2014 First-year Player Draft.)
- J.K. Dobbins – Running back for the Ohio State Buckeyes 2017–2019. Running back for the Baltimore Ravens, Los Angeles Chargers
