= Plum, Texas =

- Unincorporated community
- Location within Texas Location within the United States
- Coordinates: 29°56′06″N 96°58′03″W
- Country: United States
- State: Texas
- County: Fayette

Area
  - Total: 3.51 sq mi (9.09 km^{2})
- Elevation: 299 ft (91 m)
- Time zone: UTC-6 (Central (CST))
  - Summer (DST): UTC-5 (CDT)
- ZIP code: 78952
- Area code: 979
- GNIS feature ID: 1365467

Plum is an unincorporated community in Fayette County, Texas, United States. As of the 2020 census, Plum had a population of 366. Plum has a post office with the ZIP code 78952.

== Geography ==
Plum is on State Highway 71 and the Missouri, Kansas and Texas Railroad, eight miles west of La Grange in Fayette County. F. Lotto's book Fayette County, Her History and Her People, claims that the property surrounding Plum is prairie and postoak.

== Demographics ==
Historical population
| Census | Pop. | Note | %± |
|---|---|---|---|
| 2020 | 366 | | — |
U.S. Decennial Census; 1850–1900 1910; 1920 1930 1940; 1950 1960 1970; 1980 1990 2000; 2010 2020

Plum first appeared as a census-designated place in the 2020 U.S. census.

=== 2020 Census ===
Plum CDP, Texas – Racial and ethnic composition Note: the US Census treats Hispanic/Latino as an ethnic category. This table excludes Latinos from the racial categories and assigns them to a separate category. Hispanics/Latinos may be of any race.
| Race / Ethnicity (NH = Non-Hispanic) | Pop 2020 | % 2020 |
|---|---|---|
| White alone (NH) | 168 | 45.90% |
| Black or African American alone (NH) | 34 | 9.29% |
| Native American or Alaska Native alone (NH) | 0 | 0.00% |
| Asian alone (NH) | 0 | 0.00% |
| Native Hawaiian or Pacific Islander alone (NH) | 0 | 0.00% |
| Other race alone (NH) | 1 | 0.27% |
| Mixed race or Multiracial (NH) | 9 | 2.46% |
| Hispanic or Latino (any race) | 154 | 42.08% |
| Total | 366 | 100.00% |

== History ==
The area was initially settled by families from Tennessee on lands granted to Andrew Castleman in 1828 and John Cooke in 1831 and acquired the name Plum Grove. Plum Grove is the second oldest established community in Fayette County. The Hopewell (now Plum) Baptist Church was the first Baptist church in Texas established west of the Colorado River and the first in Texas to hold an ordination service and administer the ordinance of baptism. On July 8, 1861, the Plum Grove Rifles was formed under the command of Capt. Thomas C. Moore. Apparently the unit was designed for training, because its members were subsequently drafted or volunteered to join other regular units. In 1880 a post office was established, and by 1900 the community had two churches, two stores, two cotton gins, two blacksmith shops, a saloon, and a physician. By 1950 it had an estimated population of 280 and seven businesses. By the 1980s the population had dropped to ninety-five and the number of businesses to two; the town retained its post office. The discovery of oil in the Austin Chalk formation during the late 1970s and early 1980s boosted the local economy. Through 2000 the population was still ninety-five.

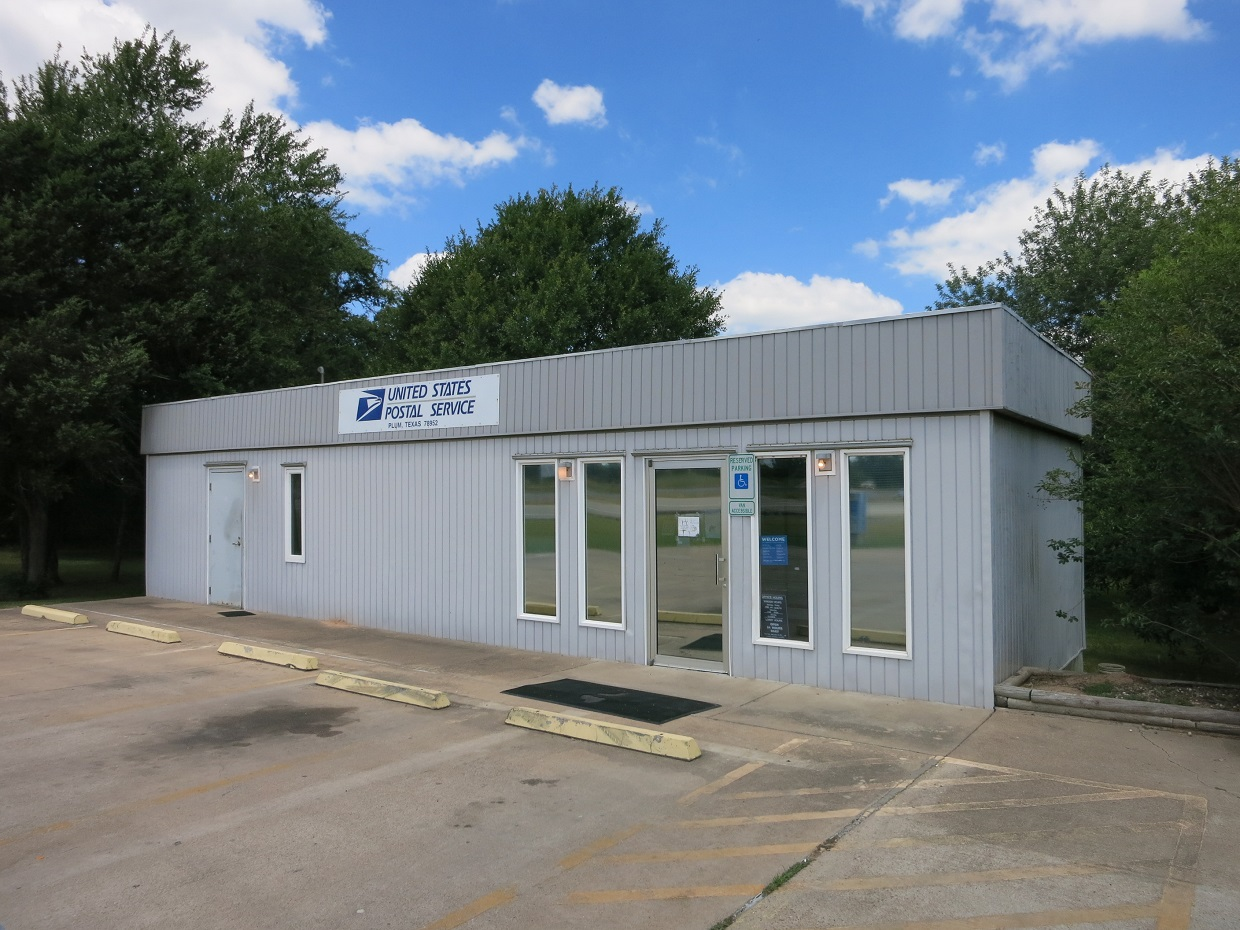
US Post Office on Texas Highway 71

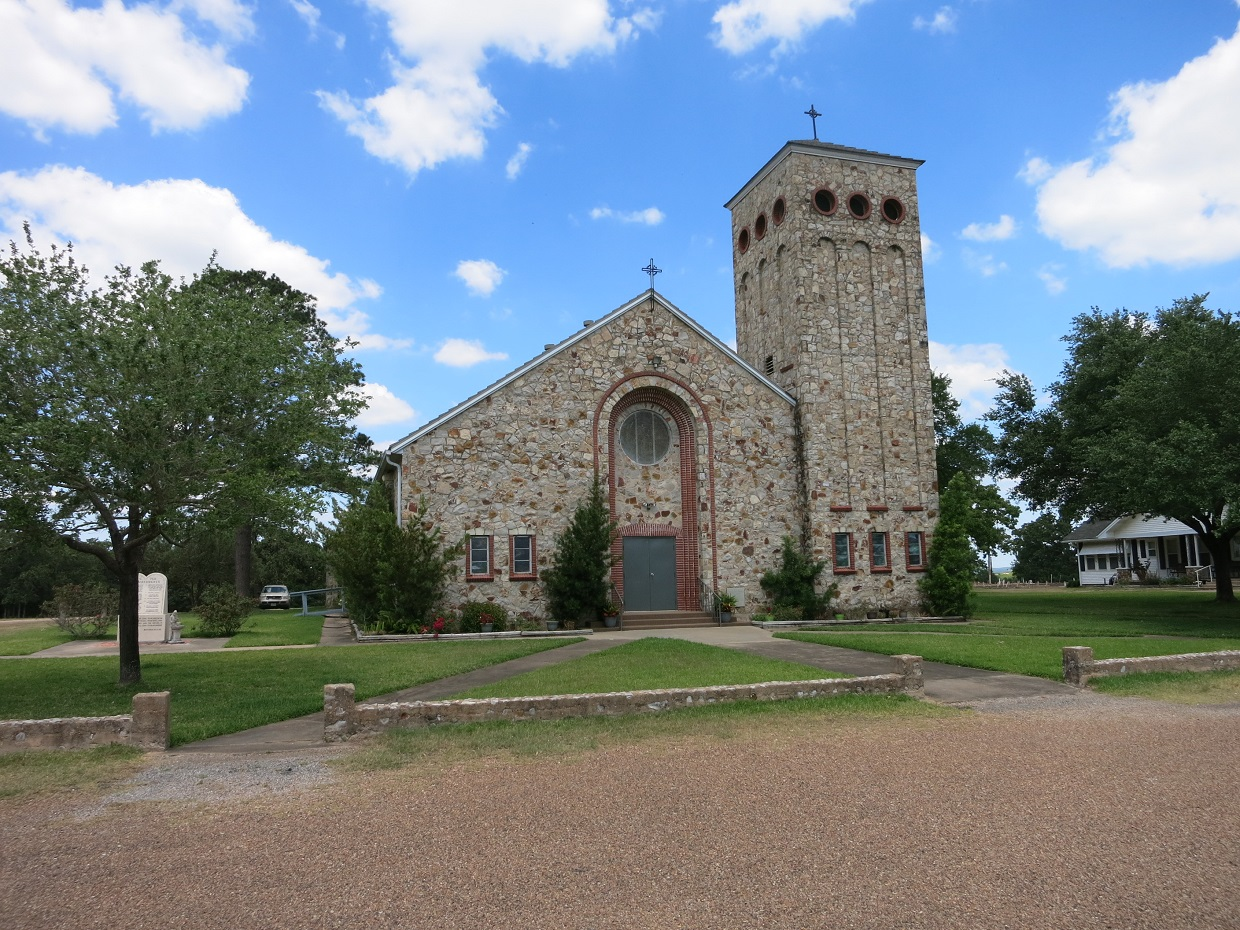
Saints Peter and Paul Catholic Church

== Education ==
It is in the La Grange Independent School District.

Areas in La Grange ISD are assigned to Blinn Junior College District.
