= West Point, Fayette County, Texas =

Unincorporated community in Texas, US

Coordinates: 29°56′38″N 97°02′13″W

West Point is an unincorporated community in western Fayette County, Texas, United States.

West Point has one post office, founded, according to USPS records, on January 27, 1873; its ZIP Code is 78963. However, it is in disrepair and is no longer staffed or accessible.

== History ==
Around 1831, the land for West Point was deeded as a town to Montreville Woods and another, unnamed member of the Woods family. In the 1880s, the first railroad arrived in the town, and a community was established. The Woods family built a stockade on the land, and the region was referred to unofficially as Wood's Prairie.

When West Point grew to have a cannery, two doctors, and three hotels; in 1873, a post office was granted. In the 1920s and '30s, TX-71 was constructed one mile south of the railroad tracks, which were operated by MK&T, and a large portion of the populace moved towards it.

During the 1940s, the population of West Point approached 300. Students attended classes in La Grange and even today, the area is served by La Grange Independent School District.

West Point fell into decline in the late 1940s, shrinking to half its size by 1950. The 1990 census was the last one conducted in the community, reporting 250 residents. This number was reused on the 2000 census and West Point fell off the register for 2010.
