= Circleville, Texas =

Circleville
- Unincorporated Community
- Interactive map of Circleville
- Location within Texas Circleville (the United States)
- Coordinates: 30°38′15″N 97°26′8″W
- Country: United States
- State: Texas
- County: Williamson County
- Elevation: 545 ft (166 m)
- Postal code: 78736

Circleville is an unincorporated community located along State Highway 95 in Williamson County, Texas, United States.

== History ==
The area where Circleville reside was first claimed by Texas Revolutionary War veterans William M. McFadin and Absalom James Jett via land certificates. McFadin, much like Jett and his family, never visited Williamson County. However, McFadin's son David Hutcheson McFadin, as well as McFadin's wife did. Somewhere before December 1846, David, alongside his wife and daughter, moved to Williamson County, residing on the bought track McFadin owned, in which legal disputes regarding the ownership rights of the track ensued until 1884. He would then build a home, cultivated land, continued to work in the stock business, and serve as the Circleville Christian Church's county commissioner for 12 years.

Jett earned the first-class land certificate in 1838, in which he then used to survey his tract that encompasses 2,568 acres in Williamson County in 1847. He sold 1800 acres of that tract to an investor named Nathan Holbert, who in turn sold 1152 acres of the sold land to Joseph Eubank Jr. Joseph, alongside his two brothers James B Eubank and William White Eubank, then migrated with their respective families to Circleville in 1852.

In its early days, the community had a cotton gin, two general stores (opened 1867 and 1870), a gristmill called Star Mills (opened in 1857), a molasses or syrup press, tin and pewter shops, two blacksmithwheelwright shops (opened in 1858 and 1878), a carding factory, a freighting business, and a cattle auction market. Circleville gained its communal post office in 1857 with James as its postmaster. Homes and outbuildings in this year were built with semicircle shaped foundations, in which it became the subject of its community's name.

In January 1869, Joseph donated land for a school-cum-church. In 1890, David donated his land for the community cemetery to be established.

The Kansas, Texas and Missouri Railroad crosses through the community in the 1880s; most of them through the Jett headright track. Several train wrecks had occurred there due to a badly designed curve located on the south side of the San Gabriel River.

In the late 19th century, many businesses in Circleville moved to Granger and Taylor since their establishment due to being more prosperous.

In 1901, the trustees of Circleville bought an acre to establish a new school and church, in which it was then built in 1904 and was called the "Colored Christian Church". The Circleville Community School District bought more land for a new school located in north side of the San Gabriel River in 1921 and 1925. The school consolidated with the Jonah School District in 1950.

The communal post office closed in 1911, and by 1980, the community had a population of 50, and the community's remaining amenities includes a cemetery, cattle auction barn, two stores, and a tavern. In 1990, the population was 42 and remained that way until 2020.
