= Keith Koehl =

The Reverend Keith Koehl
- Church: Roman Catholic
- Diocese: Austin

Orders
- Ordination: 24 May 1997

Personal details
- Born: La Grange, Texas, United States
- Education: Master of Divinity; Bachelor of Music
- Alma mater: University of St. Thomas (Texas); University of Texas at Austin

Keith Koehl is an American Roman Catholic priest of the Diocese of Austin in Texas, United States, and former Vice Rector of the Holy Trinity Seminary in Irving, Texas.

== Biography ==
Keith Koehl was born and grew up in La Grange, Texas, United States. He attended Holy Trinity Seminary from August 1990 through May 1992 as a pre-theologian, and major seminary at St. Mary’s Seminary in Houston, Texas. He was ordained to the priesthood for the Diocese of Austin on May 24, 1997.

Before Holy Trinity Seminary, Koehl served as the pastor of St. Patrick’s Catholic Church in Hutto, Texas (2006-2016), overseeing the establishment of its new church site and parish offices as the parish grew to over 600 families. His previous assignments include parochial vicar at St. Mary’s Catholic Center, a campus ministry at Texas A&M University in College Station (2001-2006), as well as parochial vicar at St. Thomas More Catholic Church (Austin, Texas) (1997-2001).
