= Lincoln, Texas =

- Unincorporated community
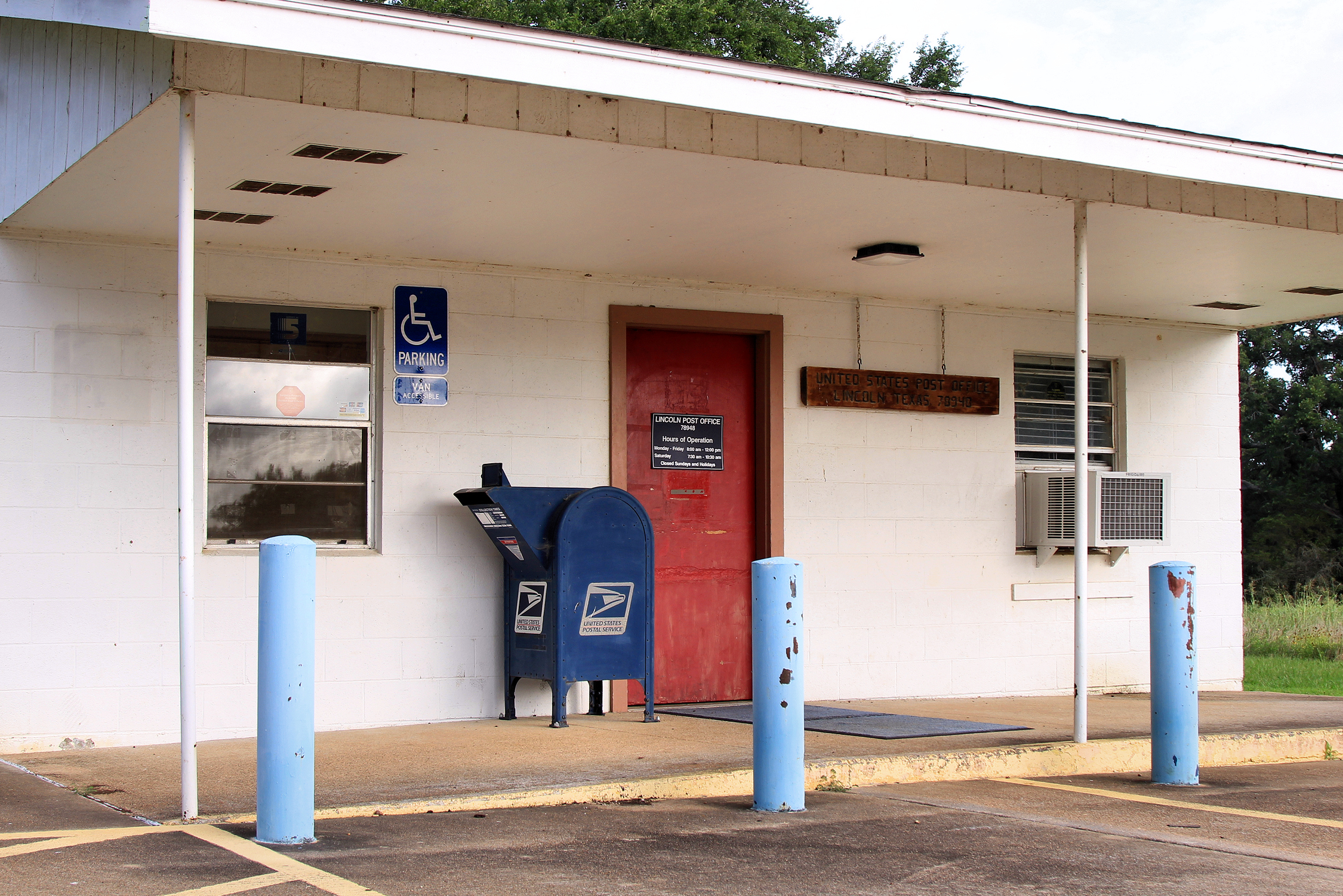
- Lincoln post office

- Location in Texas Location in the United States
- Coordinates: 30°17′15″N 96°57′48″W
- Country: United States
- State: Texas
- County: Lee
- Elevation: 371 ft (113 m)

Population (2000)
  - Total: 276
- Time zone: UTC-6 (Central (CST))
  - Summer (DST): UTC-5 (CDT)
- ZIP codes: 78948
- GNIS feature ID: 1339937

Lincoln is an unincorporated community in central Lee County, Texas, United States. It lies along Highway 21, north of the city of Giddings, the county seat of Lee County. Although Lincoln is unincorporated, it has a post office, with the ZIP code of 78948.

Lincoln was formerly named Evergreen. Evergreen was the home town of the infamous American Old West gunfighter Bill Longley.
