= Texas State Highway Loop 111 =

State highway in Texas

State Highway Loop 111
- Airport Boulevard

Route information
- Maintained by TxDOT
- Length: 4.219 mi (6.790 km)
- Existed: orig. 1940 curr. 1960–present

Major junctions
- South end: US 183
- North end: FM 969

Location
- Country: United States
- State: Texas

Highway system
- Highways in Texas; Interstate; US; State; Former; Toll; Loops; Spurs; FM/RM; Park; Rec
| ← Loop 110 | → Spur 112 |

Loop 111 is a 4.219-mile (6.790 km) state-maintained roadway located in Austin, Texas. It is named Airport Boulevard.

== History ==
Spur 111 was originally assigned on August 27, 1940 from SH 70 in Spur, Texas to the Texas State Experimental Farm. On May 19, 1942, it was modified to start at Loop 21. The route number was changed to FM 836 on November 6, 1948. The western part is now FM 2794. On March 22, 1960, Loop 111 was designated as the Austin Loop, running east of Austin from I-35 down to US 290 and extended further south to US 183 on August 23, 1960. This section of road was redesignated as US 183 on June 10, 1966, causing Loop 111 to move to its current location along Airport Boulevard.

The section of Airport Boulevard between I-35 and FM 969 was removed from Loop 111 on May 24, 2007, but the signage in that portion has not been removed (as of September 2010). Airport Boulevard itself continues north of FM 969 to cross I-35 and Spur 69 (leading to RM 2222) before terminating at Lamar Boulevard.

Loop 111 is named Airport Boulevard because it once formed the south boundary of Robert Mueller Municipal Airport, which was the main airport serving Austin until 1999. Mueller Airport was closed when Austin-Bergstrom International Airport was opened, and the former airport site is undergoing development into a mixed-use residential, retail and commercial district. Contributing to the name is the northern end at Lamar is the site of the University Airport which closed around 1949.

== Route description ==
Loop 111 is a four- and six-lane urban roadway running just east of the Austin central business district. It starts at an intersection with US 183 just north of the Colorado River. Loop 111 proceeds north along Airport Boulevard for 4.2 miles (6.8 km) to its northern end at an intersection with FM 969. Airport Boulevard itself continues north and west to cross I-35 and Spur 69.

== Junction list ==
The entire route is in Austin, Travis County.

| mi | km | Destinations | Notes |
|---|---|---|---|
| 0.0 | 0.0 | US 183 (Ed Bluestein Boulevard) / 183 Toll Road (Bergstrom Expressway) | |
| 4.2 | 6.8 | FM 969 (Martin Luther King Jr. Boulevard) | |
1.000 mi = 1.609 km; 1.000 km = 0.621 mi
