= Farm to Market Road 969 =

Road in Texas, United States

Farm to Market Road 969

Route information
- Maintained by TxDOT
- Length: 28.954 mi (46.597 km)
- Existed: November 23, 1948–present

Major junctions
- West end: Loop 111 in Austin
- US 183; SH 130 Toll
- East end: SH 21 / SH 71 near Bastrop

Location
- Country: United States
- State: Texas

Highway system
- Highways in Texas; Interstate; US; State; Former; Toll; Loops; Spurs; FM/RM; Park; Rec
← FM 968	→ FM 970

Farm to Market Road 969 (FM 969) is a 28.95-mile (46.59 km) farm-to-market road located in Travis and Bastrop counties in the U.S. state of Texas.

== Route description ==
FM 969 begins at an intersection with Loop 111 (Airport Boulevard), east of Interstate 35. It proceeds east along MLK Boulevard for 6.3 miles (10.1 km), passing by Morris Williams Golf Course and US 183 before leaving the Austin city limits. The route passes FM 973 south of Lake Walter E. Long and continues east and southeast for 22.6 miles (36.4 km), passing through the villages of Utley and Webberville before terminating at an intersection with SH 71/SH 21, just west of Bastrop. Between Austin and Webberville, FM 969 is named Webberville Road. Several graveyards dating to the Republic of Texas era are located along this segment.

== History ==
FM 969 originally started at SH 29 at 19th Street, northeast of downtown Austin; at the time, SH 29 was along the current alignment of Loop 111. It then proceeded eastward along 19th Street, terminating near Hornsby Bend. On December 17, 1952, FM 969 was extended east to FM 1704. On September 23, 1953, FM 969 was extended west to US 81 (now I-35) On March 26, 1958, it had been extended to its current eastern termination point at SH 71/SH 21.

In 1975, 19th Street was renamed MLK Boulevard between Lamar Boulevard and the Austin city limits.

On July 11, 1986, the segment between I-35 and Loop 111 was removed from FM 969 and returned to city maintenance. This segment passes by Oakwood Cemetery, the oldest cemetery in Austin, and by UFCU Disch-Falk Field, the University of Texas at Austin baseball field.

On June 27, 1995, the segment of FM 969 between Loop 111 and FM 973 was redesignated Urban Road 969 (UR 969), while the segment east of FM 973 remained FM 969. The designation of the UR 969 section reverted to FM 969 with the elimination of the Urban Road system on November 15, 2018.

The bridge over Walnut Creek between US 183 and SH 130 was rebuilt between 2001 and 2003.

== Junction list ==
County	Location	mi	km	Destinations	Notes
Travis	Austin	0.0	0.0	Loop 111 (Airport Boulevard)	
Travis	Austin	2.3	3.7	US 183 (Ed Bluestein Boulevard) / 183 Toll Road (Bergstrom Expressway)	Diamond interchange
Travis	Austin	4.1	6.6	FM 3177 (Decker Lane)	Southern terminus of FM 3177
Travis		6.2	10.0	FM 973	
Travis		6.7	10.8	SH 45 Toll / SH 130 Toll (Pickle Parkway)	Diamond interchange; SH 130 exit 444
Bastrop		19.8	31.9	FM 1704	Southern terminus of FM 1704
Bastrop		25.0	40.2	FM 1209	Northern terminus of FM 1209
Bastrop	Bastrop	28.9	46.5	SH 21 / SH 71	Access to/from westbound SH 21/71 frontage road only
1.000 mi = 1.609 km; 1.000 km = 0.621 mi
