= Chireno, Texas =

- City
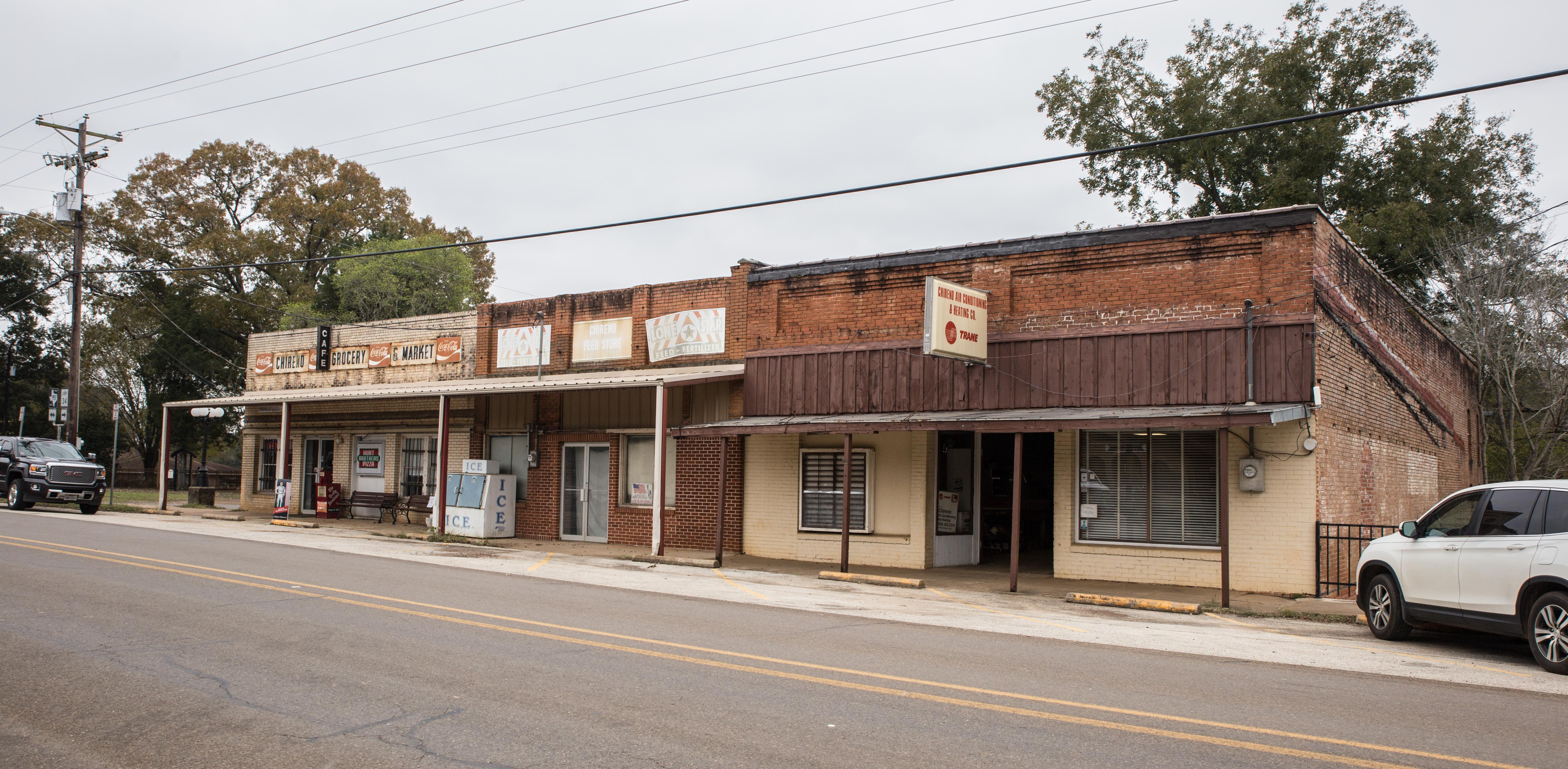

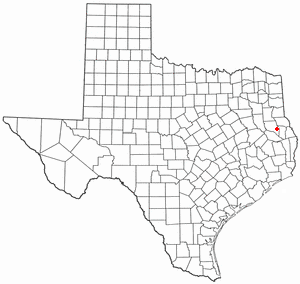
- Location of Chireno, Texas

- Location of Chireno inside of Nacogdoches County
- Coordinates: 31°30′11″N 94°20′41″W
- Country: United States
- State: Texas
- County: Nacogdoches

Area
  - Total: 1.87 sq mi (4.85 km^{2})
  - Land: 1.87 sq mi (4.85 km^{2})
  - Water: 0 sq mi (0.00 km^{2})
- Elevation: 269 ft (82 m)

Population (2020)
  - Total: 370
  - Density: 197.4/sq mi (76.23/km^{2})
- Time zone: UTC-6 (Central (CST))
  - Summer (DST): UTC-5 (CDT)
- ZIP code: 75937
- Area code: 936
- FIPS code: 48-14776
- GNIS feature ID: 2409456
- Website: www.chireno.com

Chireno (/ʃɪˈriːnoʊ/ shi-REE-noh) is a city in Nacogdoches County, Texas, United States. Its population was 370 at the 2020 census.

== Geography ==
According to the United States Census Bureau, the city has a total area of 1.9 square miles (4.9 km^{2}), all land.

== Demographics ==
Historical population
| Census | Pop. | Note | %± |
|---|---|---|---|
| 1890 | 276 | | — |
| 1970 | 308 | | — |
| 1980 | 371 | | 20.5% |
| 1990 | 415 | | 11.9% |
| 2000 | 405 | | −2.4% |
| 2010 | 386 | | −4.7% |
| 2020 | 370 | | −4.1% |
U.S. Decennial Census

=== 2020 census ===
As of the 2020 census, Chireno had a population of 370. The median age was 35.9 years; 29.7% of the residents were under 18 and 15.1% were 65 or older. For every 100 females, there were 88.8 males, and for every 100 females 18 and over, there were 81.8 males 18 and over.

None of the residents lived in urban areas, while 100.0% lived in rural areas.

Of the 144 households in Chireno, 43.1% had children under 18 living in them, 50.7% were married-couple households, 13.9% were households with a male householder and no spouse or partner present, and 28.5% were households with a female householder and no spouse or partner present. About 22.9% of all households were made up of individuals, and 11.8% had someone living alone who was 65 or older.

The city had 169 housing units, of which 14.8% were vacant. Among occupied housing units, 72.2% were owner-occupied and 27.8% were renter-occupied. The homeowner vacancy rate was <0.1% and the rental vacancy rate was 14.3%.

Racial composition as of the 2020 census
| Race | Percentage | Number |
|---|---|---|
| White | 76.5% | 283 |
| Black or African American | 8.4% | 31 |
| American Indian and Alaska Native | 0.8% | 3 |
| Some other race | 7.0% | 26 |
| Two or more races | 7.3% | 27 |
| Hispanic or Latino (of any race) | 15.9% | 59 |

=== 2010 census ===
As of the 2010 census, Chireno had a population of 386. The median age was 40. The racial makeup of the population was 75.9% White, 14.2% Black or African American, 8.3% from some other race, and 1.6% from two races ( White and Native American); 11.1% of the population was Hispanic or Latino of any race.

=== 2000 census ===
As of the census of 2000, 405 people, 156 households, and 109 families were residing in the city. The population density was 216.1 inhabitants per square mile (83.4/km^{2}). The 180 housing units had an average density of 96.1 per square mile (37.1/km^{2}). The racial makeup of the city was 82.96% White, 12.59% African American, 0.99% from other races, and 3.46% from two or more races. Hispanics or Latinos of any race were 6.17% of the population.

Of the 156 households, 30.1% had children under 18 living with them, 52.6% were married couples living together, 13.5% had a female householder with no husband present, and 30.1% were not families. About 28.8% of all households were made up of individuals, and 16.0% had someone living alone who was 65 or older. The average household size was 2.60, and the average family size was 3.21.

In the city, the age distribution was 25.7% under 18, 8.9% from 18 to 24, 25.2% from 25 to 44, 22.0% from 45 to 64, and 18.3% who were 65 or older. The median age was 36 years. For every 100 females, there were 84.9 males. For every 100 females 18 and over, there were 81.3 males.

The median income in the city for a household was $25,625 and for a family was $35,833. Males had a median income of $25,625 versus $20,227 for females. The per capita income for the city was $14,099. About 17.6% of families and 23.9% of the population were below the poverty line, including 37.9% of those under 18 and 21.1% of those 65 or over.

== Climate ==
The climate in this area is characterized by hot, humid summers and generally mild to cool winters. According to the Köppen climate classification, Chireno has a humid subtropical climate, Cfa on climate maps.
