= Bill Longley (gunfighter) =

American outlaw

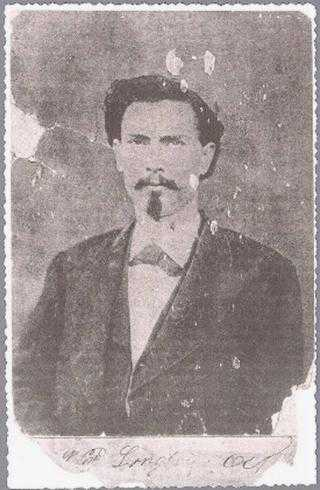
- William Preston Longley
- Born: William Preston Longley; October 6, 1851; Austin County, Texas, U.S.
- Died: October 11, 1878 (aged 27); Giddings, Texas, U.S.
- Cause of death: Execution by hanging
- Other name: Bloody Bill
- Conviction: Murder
- Penalty: Death

William Preston Longley (October 6, 1851 – October 11, 1878), also known as Wild Bill Longley, was an American Old West outlaw and gunfighter noted for his ruthless nature, speed with a gun, quick temper, and unpredictable demeanor. He is considered to have been one of the deadliest gunfighters in the Old West.

== Early life ==
Bill Longley was born on Mill Creek in Austin County, Texas, the sixth of ten children of Campbell and Sarah Longley. His family moved when he was two years old and he was raised on a farm near Old Evergreen, Texas, in present-day Lincoln, Lee County, Texas, where he spent a large part of his childhood learning to shoot. He received an average education for the time. He was six feet (183 cm) tall with a thin build, jet black hair.

By 1867, Texas was fully under the control of the Union due to the Reconstruction Act. The military acted in all capacities, including law enforcement, which caused considerable resentment throughout the state. Around this time, Longley dropped out of school and began living a wild life, drinking, and running in the company of others of a similar disposition.

== First murders in Texas ==
In 1867 the Longley family farm was just one mile from the Camino Real, an old Spanish royal highway that joined San Antonio and Nacogdoches, Texas.

In mid-December 1868, three former slaves named Green Evans, Pryer Evans, and the third known only as Ned, rode through Evergreen, intending evidently to visit friends farther south. Longley, accompanied by a couple of friends, forced the three men at gunpoint into a dry creek bed. Green Evans panicked and spurred his horse to escape. Longley shot at him several times, killing him.

Longley and his friends went through the dead man's pockets, as Pryer Evans and Ned rode away. Although given sole responsibility for the murder, Longley later claimed that he was not the only one shooting. Longley's account of this murder differs from that of his later killings, where he was more inclined to brag about shooting men than to try to divert blame to others. Some versions of Evans' killing claim he was a member of the Texas State Police; the TSP only existed from 1870 to 1873.

Longley drifted around Texas for a time, and while gambling in saloons he became acquainted with noted gambler Phil Coe In 1869, Longley and his brother-in-law, John Wilson, embarked on a crime spree through southern Texas. Together they robbed settlers, and in one instance killed a freed slave named Paul Brice in Bastrop County, Texas, after which they stole his horses. They reportedly also killed a freed slave woman in Evergreen.

In March 1870, a $1,000 reward for their capture was offered by the Union military authority. Longley later claimed that Wilson was killed by outlaws in 1870 in Brazos County, Texas, although conflicting evidence suggests he was actually killed in 1874 in Falls County, Texas.

== U.S. Cavalry career ==
Longley left Texas and moved north to avoid the authorities and by May 1870, he had joined a gold-hunting party in Cheyenne, Wyoming.

The gold mining party travelled into the Black Hills of South Dakota, but a treaty with the Sioux prohibited mining, and the party disbanded when intercepted by a U.S. cavalry unit. On June 22, 1870, Longley enlisted for a five-year commitment in the army, joining Company B of the U.S. 2nd Cavalry Regiment. His unit was stationed at Camp Stambaugh. He deserted two weeks later, as he was unable to adapt to the strict lifestyle, but was captured and court-martialed. He was sentenced to two years hard labor, strapped to a ball and chain, and imprisoned at Camp Stambaugh. He was held for four months and then released to return to his unit. His marksmanship skills were noticed, and he was assigned to the regular hunting parties regularly leaving the post. He deserted again in May 1872.

== Return to Texas and further murders ==
Longley's travels for the rest of 1872 are unknown, but by February 1873 he had returned to Texas, where he was accused of murdering another freedman in Bastrop County. Following that, he returned to live with his father's family in Bell County, Texas. In the summer of that year, Mason County Sheriff, J. J. Finney, arrested Longley for murder and took him to Austin to collect a reward. When the federal military reward was not forthcoming from state officials, however, Finney released Longley, possibly in exchange for a bribe from Longley's uncle, Alexander "Pres" Preston Longley, of California.

On March 31, 1875, Longley killed his childhood friend, Wilson Anderson, with a shotgun. The murder was alleged to have been instigated by Longley's uncle, Caleb B. Longley, who had blamed Anderson for the death of his son, Cale, and urged Longley to take revenge. Longley then fled northward, accompanied by his brother, James Stockton Longley, who was later tried and acquitted of Anderson's murder. A new reward was posted for Longley's capture.

Under increasing pressure from law enforcement, Longley fled from place to place and used several aliases to avoid arrest. He briefly found work on a cotton farm, but he was forced to run again in November 1875, after murdering a hunting buddy named George Thomas with whom he had had a fistfight.

Longley committed another killing in Uvalde County, Texas in January 1876, when his attempted ambush of fellow outlaw and former US soldier, William Lewis "Lou" Shroyer, turned into a gunfight. Shroyer shot Longley's horse out from under him, but Longley shot Shroyer dead. This is the only known case in Longley's career where one of his victims returned fire.

Fleeing again, Longley went to east Texas and became a sharecropper for a preacher, William R. Lay. Stability eluded him again, however, when he became a rival, with Lay's nephew, for the affections of a young woman. Longley beat up his rival, was subsequently jailed, and escaped. He blamed Lay for his brief imprisonment. On June 13, 1876, Longley rode out to his landlord's farm, found him milking a cow, and murdered him with a shotgun. Lay was the last man known to have been killed by Longley.

Longley next possibly went to Grayson County, Texas, where two of his friends, Jim and Dick Sanders, were in jail. He broke them out, and the trio escaped, disarming deputy Matt Shelton when he tried to arrest them. Longley fled to Louisiana. Approximately one year later, deputy Matt Shelton confirmed the encounter.

== Capture and execution ==
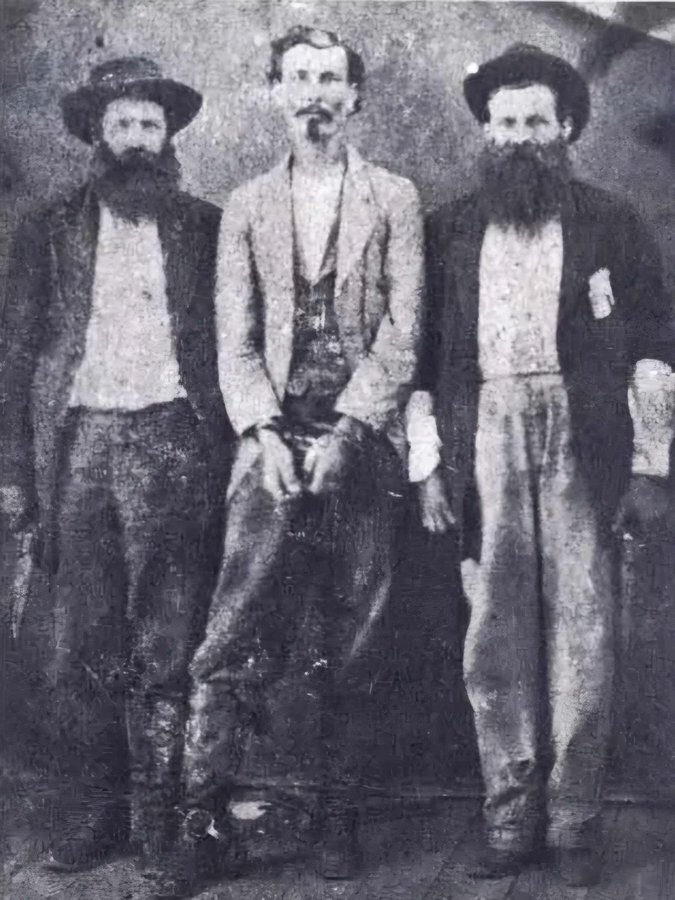
Picture of Sherriff Bill Burrows [left] and Sherriff Milt Mast (right) with a handcuffed William Longley (center)

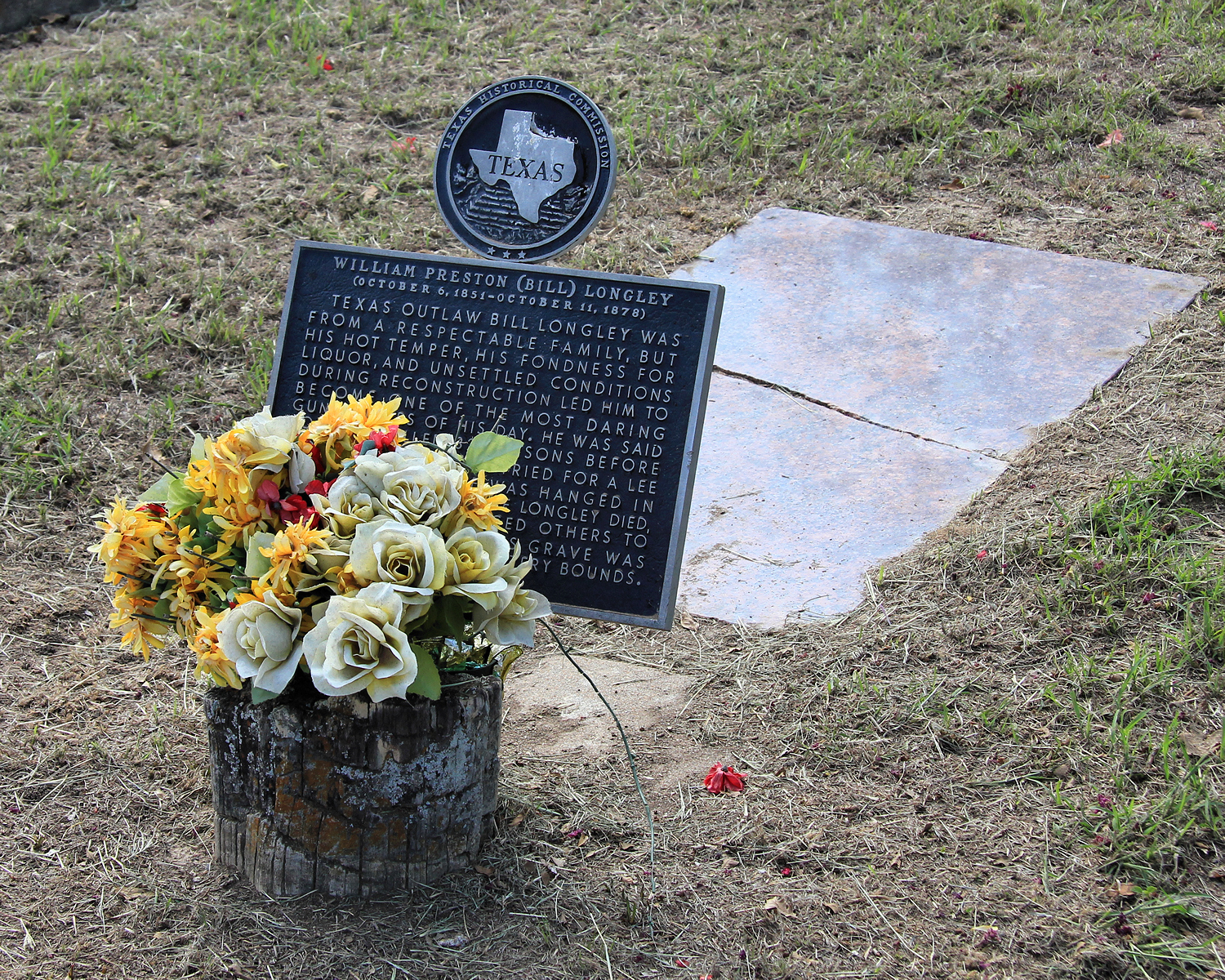
Grave site of Bill Longley in Giddings City Cemetery

On June 6, 1877, Longley was surrounded and arrested without incident by Nacogdoches County Sheriff Milt Mast and two deputies while he was residing in De Soto Parish, Louisiana under the alias "Bill Jackson." He was returned to Texas, tried in the Lee County Court, and sentenced to hang for the murder of Wilson Anderson. His appeal was denied in March 1878. On October 11, 1878, Longley was executed by hanging in Giddings, Texas, only a few miles from his childhood home of Evergreen. His grave and a state historical marker are in the Giddings City Cemetery.

== Legend, hoaxes, and tall tales ==
Although he was known to have committed seven murders Longley claimed to have killed thirty-two people, mostly of African American heritage.

=== Death hoax ===
Years after the execution, Longley's father, Campbell, came forward in a press release stating that his son had not been executed, and the death had been faked. After confirming the location of Longley's grave site, an exhumation of the human remains was performed in 2000. They were taken to the Smithsonian Institution in Washington D. C., where DNA tests were performed, along with a skull reconstruction. In June 2001, it was officially reported that the remains from the grave site were indeed those of Bill Longley.

=== Unverified claims ===
Numerous myths and legends have grown up about Longley that cannot be verified by any contemporary source. Many of these legends trace back to tall tales that Longley himself told while imprisoned in Giddings in 1877. Some of these stories are probably false, while others could be true but lack any contemporary corroborating evidence. Longley's lies appear to have been motivated partly by his desire to rival John Wesley Hardin's reputation as a killer. Ironically Longley was outraged when he found he was to be put to death, while Hardin had only been sentenced to twenty-five years in prison.

The most clearly false story Longley told was of being captured and lynched in 1869 alongside one of Cullen Baker's outlaw gang, surviving when a lucky shot severed the rope he had been hanged from, and then joining Baker's riders. As Baker was dead and his band dispersed at the time Longley claimed this happened, the story cannot be true. There is no contemporaneous evidence to back claims that Longley murdered a black militiaman in Old Evergreen in 1866 for insulting his father, or that he shot eight black people in Lexington in 1867 to avenge the loss of a horse racing bet. Furthermore, Longley would have been 14 and 15 years old respectively at the time of the alleged incidents. True or false, the stories are consistent with Longley's well-established racist character; in his own words he "...was taught to believe it was right to kill sassy negroes..."

Longley's account of killing a trail boss named Rector while en route to Wyoming in 1870 is similarly of unknown veracity.

== Weapons of choice ==
Traditionally, Longley is said to have used a pair of Dance .44 revolvers; the Dance was a Texas-manufactured imitation of the Colt Dragoon. However, he used a shotgun to kill both Wilson Anderson and William Lay, his only murders for which his weapon is definitely known.

== In popular culture ==
Longley figures prominently in Louis L'Amour's 1959 novel The First Fast Draw, a highly fictionalized version of Cullen Baker's life. Longley is a major character in The Pistoleer, a novel by James Carlos Blake (Berkley Books, NY, 1995).

In 1954, the actor Douglas Kennedy played Longley in an episode of the syndicated western television series Stories of the Century. In 1958, Steve McQueen played Longley in Season 2, Episode 23 of Tales of Wells Fargo. Longley is the title character in The Texan, a television series starring Rory Calhoun which aired on CBS from 1958-1960, which portrayed Longley as a noble wanderer.
