= Muldoon, Texas =

- Unincorporated place
- Location within Texas Location within the United States
- Coordinates: 29°48′57″N 97°04′16″W
- Country: United States
- State: Texas
- County: Fayette

Area
  - Total: 0.66 sq mi (1.7 km^{2})
  - Water: 0.039 sq mi (0.1 km^{2})
- Elevation: 341 ft (104 m)

Population (2025)
  - Total: 720
- Time zone: UTC-6 (Central (CST))
  - Summer (DST): UTC-5 (CDT)
- ZIP code: 78949
- Area code: 361
- FIPS code: 48-40276
- GNIS feature ID: 1342244

Muldoon is a town in southwestern Fayette County, Texas, United States, located 10 miles north of Flatonia and 16 miles southwest of La Grange. It is at the junction of FM 154 and FM 2237. Its population, according to the 2010 census, is 114.

== History ==
The town of Muldoon was named after Father Michael Muldoon, a clergyman who briefly served Stephen F. Austin's first colonists. He was the only non-Hispanic member of the Monterrey, Mexico Diocese and was probably assigned his duties because he spoke English. He was born in County Cavan in Ireland and later ordained in Spain.

In 1834, Muldoon travelled to Mexico to visit Stephen F. Austin during Austin's confinement there. Later, he assisted William Wharton in his escape from a Matamoros prison in 1837, after which the town of Wharton, Texas was founded. Muldoon was openly pro-Texan, which led to his own brief imprisonment by the Mexican government. However, he eventually was released, and even travelled back to Texas following the revolution, making an appearance in 1842 during which he was given a letter of appreciation from Texas President Anson Jones. Afterward, Father Muldoon disappeared from history and his final resting place is unknown.

The San Antonio and Aransas Pass Railroad tracks, laid in the early 1900s alongside what later was designated FM 154, once carried a high volume of passenger traffic to and from Muldoon on a regular basis. During this period, the railroad formed a large portion of Muldoon's economy; however, ridership eventually dwindled and Muldoon's prominence as a rail depot faded. Additionally, the advent of diesel power obviated the need for locomotives to refill their water tanks, which further reduced the number of trains stopping in Muldoon. The old train station was abandoned in the 1950s with discontinuance of the Dinky (a small passenger train) that ran a route from Flatonia to Muldoon. In the 1960s, Hurricane Carla severely damaged the old water tower that had served the steam locomotives, and this structure subsequently was removed.

Muldoon once had a thriving business community, including several stores, at least one saloon, a blacksmith shop, a small hotel, and a rock quarry that produced the stone used in the construction of the Galveston jetties. None of these businesses are still in operation. The Kerr Store, which was built in 1890 and abandoned in the mid 1900s, still stands today along FM 154, along with another former store building, the former blacksmith shop, and several other historic buildings.
