= Voca, Texas =

Unincorporated community in Texas, US

Coordinates: 31°00′40″N 99°11′04″W

Voca is an unincorporated community in McCulloch County, Texas, United States. According to the Handbook of Texas, the community had an estimated population of 56 in 2000.

Voca has a post office, with the ZIP code 76887.
