= Winchester, Texas =

Unincorporated community in Texas, US

Winchester
- Unincorporated community
- Location within Texas
- Coordinates: 30°00′34″N 97°00′50″W
- Country: United States
- State: Texas
- County: Fayette
- First settled: 1827
- Post office established: 1867
- Founder: John Ingram
- Named for: Winchester, Tennessee

Population (2000)
  - Total: 50
- Time zone: Central Standard Time
  - Summer (DST): Central Daylight Time
- Postal code: 78945
- Area code: 979

Winchester is an unincorporated community in northwestern Fayette County, Texas, United States.

== Education ==
Winchester is located in the La Grange Independent School District.
