= La Grange Independent School District =

School district in Texas, United States

Address
- 560 North Monroe La Grange, Texas, 78945; United States

District information
- Grades: PK–12
- Schools: 3
- NCES District ID: 4826100

Students and staff
- Students: 1,926 (2023–2024)
- Teachers: 142.61 (on an FTE basis)
- Student–teacher ratio: 13.51:1

Other information
- Website: www.lgisd.net

La Grange Independent School District is a public school district based in La Grange, Texas, United States. As of 2019, the district's superintendent is William (Bill) Wagner, and the assistant superintendent is Stacy Eilers.

The district serves the city of La Grange and unincorporated areas in Fayette County, including Winchester.

In 2009, the school district was rated "academically acceptable" by the Texas Education Agency.

== Schools ==
All schools are located in the city of La Grange.

- La Grange High School – grades 9–12; principal: John Pineda; assistant principal: Brad Harbers
- La Grange Middle School – grades 7–8; principal: Dr. Sarah Otto; assistant principal: Regina Walker
- Hermes/Intermediate School – prekindergarten-grade 6; principal: Lauren Almanza; assistant principals: Stephanie Jurek and Dawn Given

== Bond 2017 ==
On May 6, 2017, voters approved the district's $37.9 million bond proposal, which included new elementary facilities, a band hall addition for the middle and high school, and a dual-credit center renovation.

For more information regarding Bond 2017, click here
