= La Grange, Texas =

- City
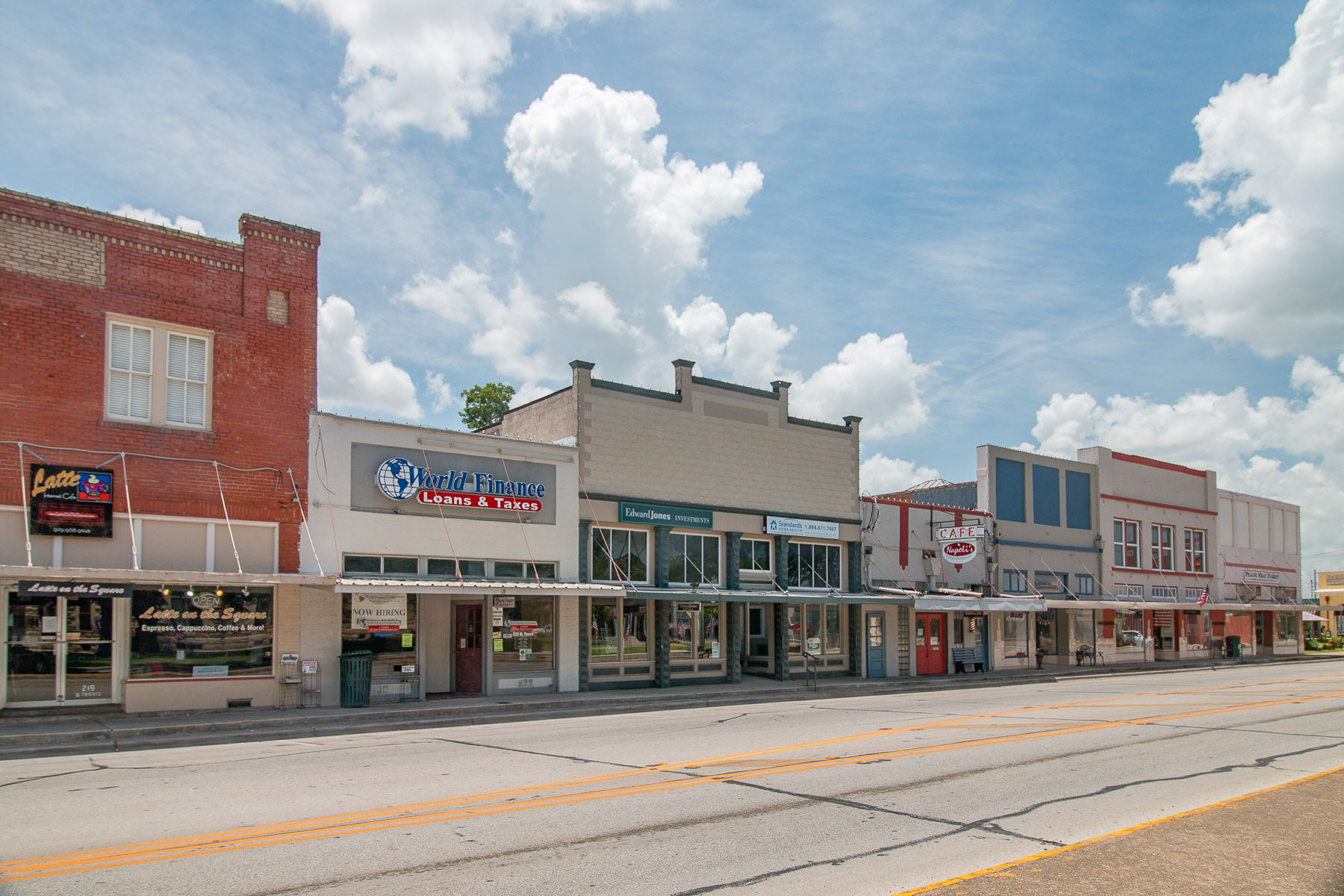
- Downtown La Grange

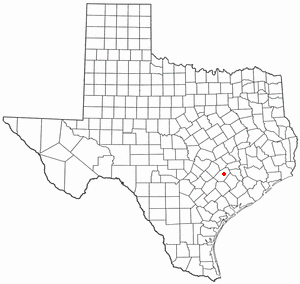
- Location of La Grange, Texas. It can be found at the intersection of State Highway 71 and U.S. 77, about an hour's drive east of Austin.

- Coordinates: 29°54′20″N 96°52′36″W
- Country: United States
- State: Texas
- County: Fayette
- Platted: 1837
- Incorporated: 1850

Government
  - Type: Mayor-Council
  - Mayor: Jan Dockery
  - City Manager: Jack Thompson

Area
  - Total: 4.15 sq mi (10.74 km^{2})
  - Land: 4.14 sq mi (10.71 km^{2})
  - Water: 0.012 sq mi (0.03 km^{2})
- Elevation: 305 ft (93 m)

Population (2020)
  - Total: 4,391
  - Density: 1,130.8/sq mi (436.62/km^{2})
- Time zone: UTC-6 (Central (CST))
  - Summer (DST): UTC-5 (CDT)
- ZIP code: 78945
- Area code: 979
- FIPS code: 48-40276
- GNIS feature ID: 2411569
- Website: www.cityoflg.com

La Grange (/lə ˈɡreɪndʒ/ lə GRAYNJ) is a city in and the county seat of Fayette County, Texas, United States, near the Colorado River. La Grange is in the center of the Texas-German belt. As of the 2020 census, La Grange had a population of 4,391. In 2018 the estimated population was 4,632.

== History ==
La Grange was the site of an early crossing of the Colorado River along La Bahía (Lower Road) of the El Camino Real (Kings Highway), during the Spanish period. The earliest Anglo-American settlers in the area were Aylett C. Buckner and Peter Powell, who lived slightly to the west. The first Anglo-American settlement on the city's present location was by Stephen F. Austin's band of colonists in 1822. John Henry Moore built a blockhouse in 1828 (some sources cite 1826) as protection from the Comanche. The building is known as Moore's Fort and can be found today in nearby Round Top, having been moved there for restoration.

Map of La Grange, 1880

By 1831 a small community had developed around Moore's Fort. The town of La Grange was platted in 1837, during the Republic of Texas period, as the county seat for the then-new county of Fayette. Both of these place names were in honor of the Marquis de Lafayette, who fought with the Americans and aided the cause of the American Revolution; he died in 1834. Lafayette's castle in France for which La Grange was named is the Château de la Grange-Bléneau.

In the immigration wave of Germans after the revolutions of 1848, the town was a major site of German settlement; newcomers said (like the Czechs who followed them) that the rolling hills and forests were reminiscent of their homelands. In the 21st century, the German and Czech influences on the town are still visible in many local customs, the architecture, and the town's reputation for rejecting prohibition of alcoholic beverages during the 1920s and 1930s—beyond a token effort by the local authorities. German and Czech culture had a more social tradition around drinking. La Grange became the home of many Jewish immigrants in the late 19th century, who entered the region through the port of Galveston.

La Grange has a number of properties listed on the National Register of Historic Places. The town was the departure point for the Mier Expedition, known for the Black Bean Episode. Team members had gathered at a historic oak that is a local landmark. The tree survives, although it was damaged from being hit by the car of a drunk driver. The tree has a concrete support for stability.

=== Monument Hill and Kreische Brewery State Historic Sites ===
After independence, Texas continued to have armed confrontations with Mexican forces over control of the territory between the Rio Grande and the Nueces River. In what is known as the 1842 Dawson Massacre, numerous Texas militia were killed by Mexican forces near San Antonio. Several years later, the remains of those dead and of those from the black bean death lottery (Mier Expedition), were exhumed and reinterred in La Grange in a large common tomb with a sandstone vault. This took place in a ceremony on September 18, 1848, at the location now known as Monument Hill; more than 1,000 people attended, including former president of the Republic of Texas, Sam Houston.

On January 17, 1849, Heinrich Ludwig Kreische, a recent German immigrant, purchased 172 acres (70 ha) of land which included the tomb. He built a three-story house and, in 1860, began building a brewery. By 1879, it was the third-largest brewing operation in Texas, with its flagship product being "Kreische's Bluff Beer". Kreische maintained the tomb for the rest of his life, but the tomb and Kreische Brewery began to deteriorate after his death in 1882. The brewery closed in 1884.

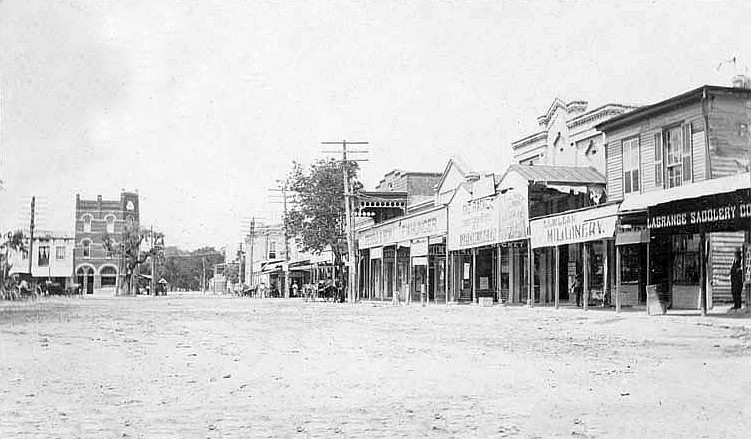
East side of public square, c. 1908

The Kreische family asked the city to remove the tomb from their property, as it was frequently vandalized. On April 15, 1905, the Texas Legislature passed a bill to authorize acquisition, by purchase or condemnation, of the 0.36 acres (0.15 ha) of land occupied by the tomb. The state acquired the land by condemnation on June 24, 1907.

In 1933, during the Great Depression, the State Highway Commission fenced the 0.36 acres and agreed to maintain it as a state park, as one of the infrastructure projects of this period. In the same year, the Daughters of the Republic of Texas purchased a new granite vault for the tomb. For the 1936 Texas Centennial, the Texas Centennial Commission erected a 48-foot (15 m) shellstone monument with an art deco mural to mark the mass grave.

In 1949, the state transferred authority for the site to the Texas Parks and Wildlife Department. In 1956, the citizens of Fayette County purchased 3.54 acres (1.43 ha) around Monument Hill and deeded the land to the state for parkland. Another 36 acres (15 ha), including the Kreische Brewery and the Kreische Home, were added to the park site in 1977. The complete site, called Monument Hill and Kreische Brewery State Historic Sites, opened to the public in 1983, after archaeological studies were completed.

Outside La Grange was a brothel known as the Chicken Ranch. It closed in 1973 after its operations were revealed, largely through the investigative and reporting efforts of Houston television journalist Marvin Zindler. The brothel inspired the 1973 ZZ Top song "La Grange". The band performed in La Grange at the Fayette County Fair on September 5, 2015. The Chicken Ranch also served as the basis for the 1978 Broadway musical The Best Little Whorehouse in Texas and its 1982 movie adaptation.

In 1974, a little league team from La Grange won the Texas state championship.

The Texas Czech Heritage and Cultural Center is located at 250 Fair Grounds Road in La Grange. The center constructed a new archives building, aided by a seed donation in 2007 from the estate of Adolph R. Hanslik of Lubbock. Hanslik was known as the "dean of West Texas cotton producers" and was a native of Hallettsville in Lavaca County.

== Geography ==
La Grange is located slightly northeast of the center of Fayette County. U.S. Route 77 passes through the center of town as Jefferson Street, leading north 20 miles (32 km) to Giddings and south 16 miles (26 km) to Schulenburg and Interstate 10. Texas State Highway 71 passes through the northern part of La Grange on a bypass, leading southeast 26 miles (42 km) to Columbus and Interstate 10, and northwest 20 miles (32 km) to Smithville. Austin is 64 miles (103 km) northwest via Highway 71, and Houston is 101 miles (163 km) east via Highway 71 and I-10.

According to the United States Census Bureau, the city has a total area of 4.1 square miles (10.7 km^{2}), of which 0.012 square miles (0.03 km^{2}), or 0.25%, is water. The city sits in the valley of the Colorado River, primarily on the northeastern side, although the city limits now extend across the river along West Travis Street as far as the Highway 71 bypass.

The center of La Grange has an elevation of 266 feet (81 m) above sea level.

== Climate ==
La Grange has sweltering summers and comfortable winters. It is the 6th hottest city in Texas.

Climate data for Muldoon, Texas
Month	Jan	Feb	Mar	Apr	May	Jun	Jul	Aug	Sep	Oct	Nov	Dec	Year
Record high °F (°C)	94 (34)	100 (38)	104 (40)	100 (38)	106 (41)	107 (42)	110 (43)	110 (43)	110 (43)	102 (39)	97 (36)	92 (33)	110 (43)
Mean daily maximum °F (°C)	65 (18)	67 (19)	73 (23)	78 (26)	84 (29)	92 (33)	100 (38)	97 (36)	91 (33)	82 (28)	74 (23)	62 (17)	80 (27)
Mean daily minimum °F (°C)	42 (6)	49 (9)	52 (11)	59 (15)	73 (23)	80 (27)	82 (28)	83 (28)	75 (24)	68 (20)	56 (13)	44 (7)	64 (18)
Record low °F (°C)	0 (−18)	10 (−12)	15 (−9)	33 (1)	42 (6)	52 (11)	59 (15)	60 (16)	41 (5)	27 (−3)	19 (−7)	0 (−18)	0 (−18)
Average rainfall inches (mm)	2.75 (70)	2.37 (60)	2.51 (64)	2.92 (74)	5.95 (151)	4.46 (113)	1.3 (33)	2.42 (61)	3.8 (97)	4.22 (107)	3.10 (79)	2.60 (66)	38.59 (980)
Source: Weatherbase

== Demographics ==
Historical population
Census	Pop.	Note	%±
1870	1,165		—
1880	1,325		13.7%
1890	1,626		22.7%
1900	2,392		47.1%
1910	1,850		−22.7%
1920	1,669		−9.8%
1930	2,354		41.0%
1940	2,531		7.5%
1950	2,738		8.2%
1960	3,623		32.3%
1970	3,092		−14.7%
1980	3,768		21.9%
1990	3,951		4.9%
2000	4,478		13.3%
2010	4,641		3.6%
2020	4,391		−5.4%
U.S. Decennial Census

=== 2020 census ===
As of the 2020 census, there were 4,391 people, 1,767 households, and 1,043 families residing in the city. The median age was 39.7 years, 25.5% of residents were under the age of 18, and 21.7% were 65 years of age or older. For every 100 females there were 90.3 males, and for every 100 females age 18 and over there were 87.1 males age 18 and over.

97.6% of residents lived in urban areas, while 2.4% lived in rural areas.

Of the 1,767 households in La Grange, 32.3% had children under the age of 18 living in them. Of all households, 44.4% were married-couple households, 17.9% were households with a male householder and no spouse or partner present, and 32.1% were households with a female householder and no spouse or partner present. About 32.7% of all households were made up of individuals and 18.6% had someone living alone who was 65 years of age or older.

There were 2,033 housing units, of which 13.1% were vacant. The homeowner vacancy rate was 3.5% and the rental vacancy rate was 7.2%.

Racial composition as of the 2020 census
Race	Number	Percent
White	2,837	64.6%
Black or African American	440	10.0%
American Indian and Alaska Native	46	1.0%
Asian	19	0.4%
Native Hawaiian and Other Pacific Islander	4	0.1%
Some other race	558	12.7%
Two or more races	487	11.1%
Hispanic or Latino (of any race)	1,330	30.3%

=== 2010 census ===
According to the census of 2010, there were 4,641 people and 1,854 households residing in La Grange. The population density was 1,292.4 people per square mile. There were 2,064 housing units. The racial makeup of the city was 56.6% non-Hispanic White, 8.7% Black or African American, 0% Native American, 0% Asian, 0% Pacific Islander. Hispanic or Latino persons were 35.6% of the population.

=== 2000 census ===
According to the census of 2000, there were 4,478 people, 1,792 households, and 1,146 families residing in the city. The population density was 1,255.2 people per square mile (484.6 people/km^{2}). There were 2,067 housing units at an average density of 579.4 units per square mile (223.7 units/km^{2}). The racial makeup of the city was 74.27% White, 10.36% African American, 0.54% Native American, 0.69% Asian, 0.02% Pacific Islander, 12.19% from other races, and 1.92% from two or more races. Hispanic or Latino people of any race were 20.81% of the population.

Of the city's 1,792 households, 31.0% had children under the age of 18, 48.8% were married couples living together, 10.7% had a female householder with no husband present, and 36.0% were non-families. Individuals made up 32.8% of all households, and 18.4% had someone living alone who was 65 years of age or older. The average household size was 2.43 and the average family size was 3.08.

In the city, the population was spread out, with 25.3% under the age of 18, 9.2% from 18 to 24, 25.3% from 25 to 44, 19.3% from 45 to 64, and 20.9% who were 65 years of age or older. The median age was 38 years. For every 100 females, there were 88.5 males. For every 100 females age 18 and over, there were 85.1 males.

The median income for a household in the city was $31,392, and the median income for a family was $39,718. Males had a median income of $28,631 versus $21,023 for females. The per capita income for the city was $15,288. About 9.2% of families and 13.4% of the population were below the poverty line, including 12.6% of those under age 18 and 9.0% of those age 65 or over.

== Sister cities ==
- Frenštát pod Radhoštěm, Czech Republic
- Olfen, Germany

== Education ==
La Grange students attend school in the La Grange Independent School District.

Students attend La Grange Elementary School, La Grange Middle School, and La Grange High School.

== Notable people ==
- Homer Bailey, former MLB pitcher, born and attended high school in La Grange
- Walker Keith Baylor, Alabama judge and politician, accidentally killed in La Grange in 1845
- J. K. Dobbins, running back for the Los Angeles Chargers, attended La Grange High School
- Johnnie Johnson, retired NFL cornerback and safety, born and attended high school in La Grange
- Jeff Kelly, retired NFL linebacker, born and attended high school in La Grange
- Keith Koehl, Roman Catholic prelate, born in La Grange
- Gabbie Nolen, country music singer, born in La Grange
- Rube Foster, American professional baseball co-founder, player, manager, and executive in the Negro leagues
