= List of Farm to Market Roads in Texas (1600–1699) =

- Texas Farm to Market Road and Ranch to Market Road markers

Highway names
- Interstates: Interstate Highway X (IH-X, I-X)
- US Highways: U.S. Highway X (US X)
- State: State Highway X (SH X)
- Loops: Loop X
- Spurs: Spur X
- Recreational: Recreational Road X (RE X)
- Farm or Ranch to Market Roads: Farm to Market Road X (FM X); Ranch to Market Road X (RM X)
- Park Roads: Park Road X (PR X)

System links
- Highways in Texas; Interstate; US; State; Former; Toll; Loops; Spurs; FM/RM; Park; Rec

Farm to Market Roads in Texas are owned and maintained by the Texas Department of Transportation (TxDOT).

== FM 1600 ==
Farm to Market Road 1600
- Location: Milam County
- Length: 10.59 mi (17.04 km)
- Existed: 1950–present

Farm to Market Road 1600 (FM 1600) is located in Milam County.

== FM 1601 ==
Farm to Market Road 1601
- Location: Ector and Crane counties
- Length: 25.546 mi (41.112 km)
- Existed: 1950–present

Farm to Market Road 1601 (FM 1601) is located in Ector and Crane counties.

== FM 1602 ==
Farm to Market Road 1602
- Location: Hamilton County
- Length: 28.849 mi (46.428 km)
- Existed: 1950–present

Farm to Market Road 1602 (FM 1602) is located in Hamilton County.

FM 1602 begins at an intersection with SH 36 in Jonesboro. The highway travels in a northwestern direction, intersects SH 22, then has a brief overlap with FM 219 near Fairy. Leaving Fairy, FM 1602 continues to pass by farmland in rural Hamilton County before ending at US 281 just south of Hico.

FM 1602 was designated in 1950, running from US 281 near Hico, southward via Fairy and Lanham to a road intersection 4.7 miles (7.6 km) south of Lenham; this section was originally signed as FM 220, but was changed to FM 1602 to avoid confusion with the nearby SH 220. In 1951, the highway was extended 2.0 miles (3.2 km) southeastward. In 1952, FM 1602 was further extended 5.1 miles (8.2 km) southeastward to SH 36 in Jonesboro, bringing the highway to its current length.

The entire route is in Hamilton County.

Location	mi	km	Destinations	Notes
Jonesboro	0.0	0.0	SH 36 – Hamilton, Gatesville	
	11.4	18.3	SH 22 – Hamilton, Cranfills Gap	
	18.7	30.1	FM 219 west – Dublin	South end of FM 219 overlap
Fairy	18.9	30.4	FM 219 east – Cranfills Gap	North end of FM 219 overlap
	28.9	46.5	US 281 – Hamilton, Stephenville	
1.000 mi = 1.609 km; 1.000 km = 0.621 mi: Concurrency terminus

== FM 1603 ==
Farm to Market Road 1603
- Location: Navarro County
- Length: 6.595 mi (10.614 km)
- Existed: 1950–present

Farm to Market Road 1603 (FM 1603) is located in Navarro County.

== FM 1604 ==
Farm to Market Road 1604
- Location: Hill County
- Length: 0.438 mi (705 m)
- Existed: November 7, 1980–present

Farm to Market Road 1604 (FM 1604) is located in Hill County. It was designated on November 7, 1980, on its current route as a renumbering of the FM 308 spur connection in Irene.

FM 1604 begins at an intersection with 2nd Street in Irene. The highway travels north along 3rd Street, intersecting 1st Street near the old town square. FM 1604 continues to travel north then makes a sharp turn to the west before ending at an intersection with FM 308.

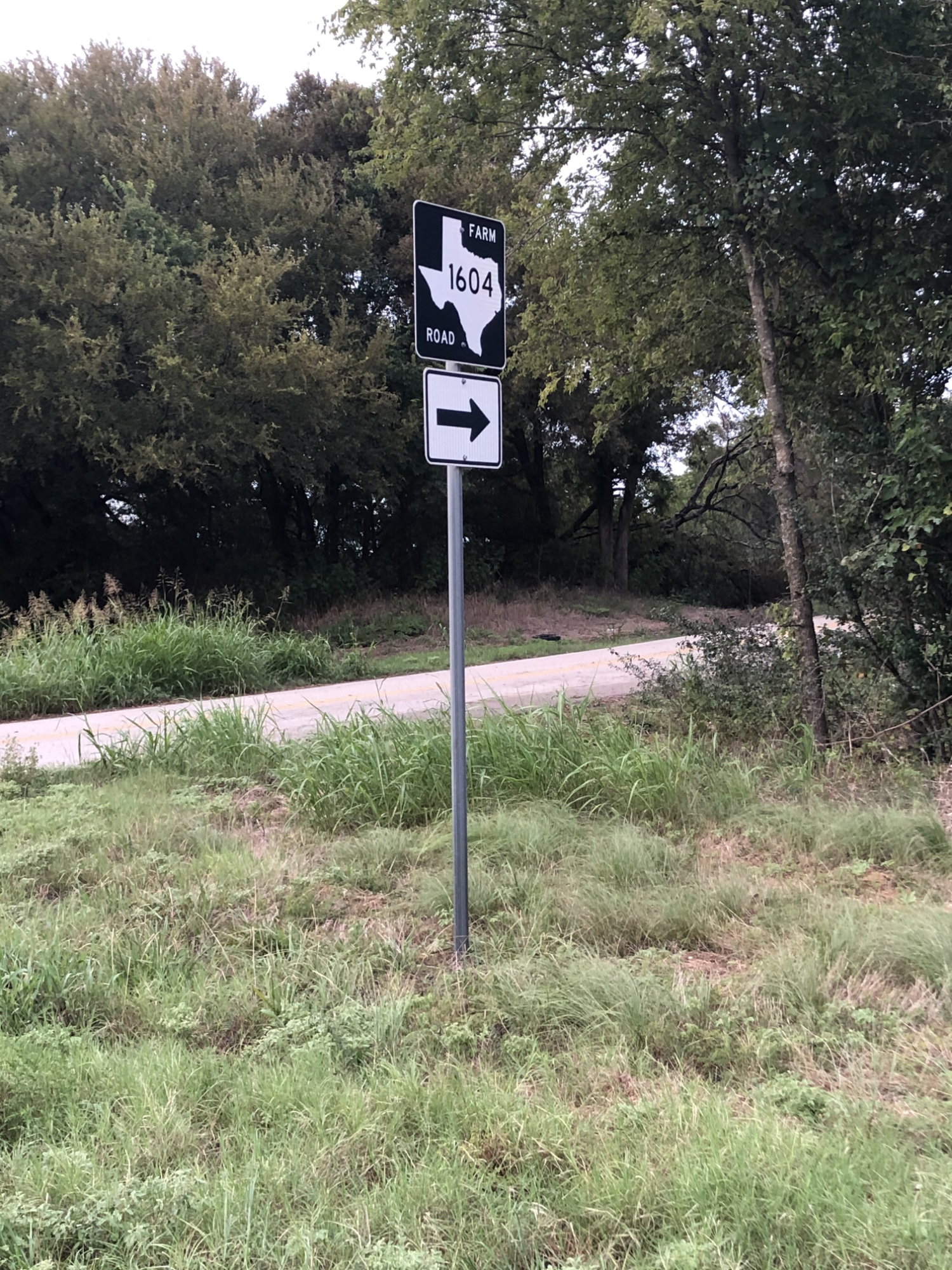
FM 1604 sign on FM 308.

=== FM 1604 (1951) ===
Farm to Market Road 1604
- Location: Baylor County
- Existed: January 30, 1951–January 14, 1957

FM 1604 was first designated on January 30, 1951. The highway ran north from FM 1153 near Seymour northward 1.0 mile (1.6 km) to a point in Baylor County. FM 1604 was cancelled on January 14, 1957, and transferred to RM 1919.

=== FM 1604 (1957) ===
Farm to Market Road 1604
- Location: Bexar County
- Existed: November 20, 1956–June 30, 1977

FM 1604 was designated again on November 20, 1956, running east from US 87 (now concurrent with I-10) to US 281 at a distance of approximately 8.2 miles (13.2 km). On December 19, 1958, FM 1604 was extended 13.5 miles (21.7 km) to US 90. On August 7, 1959, the highway was extended another 22.0 miles (35.4 km) when it absorbed Loop 334 from US 87 to FM 2173 (now Macdona Lacoste Road) in Macdona. FM 1604 was extended to the San Antonio River on May 3, 1963. On August 23, 1964, FM 1627 (which went from I-35 to SH 218) became part of FM 1604 because the sections from US 281 to I-35 and from SH 218 to US 90 opened. The highway was extended from the San Antonio River to I-10 east of San Antonio on May 7, 1969, completing the loop around San Antonio at a distance of approximately 93.4 miles (150.3 km). On August 23, 1973, the section of FM 1518 from SH 16 to FM 2173 was redesignated and officially signed as FM 1604. On September 4, 1973, most of FM 2173, which went from Kinney Road south of Macdona to FM 1518, was redesignated and officially signed as FM 1604. The rest of FM 2173 was given to the city of Somerset. On June 30, 1977, FM 1604 was cancelled and redesignated as Loop 1604 as the section from US 90 south to FM 1518 opened, creating a full loop, replacing the section of FM 1518 from SH 16 to the current junction with Loop 1604.

== FM 1605 ==
Farm to Market Road 1605
- Location: Scurry County
- Length: 2.109 mi (3.394 km)
- Existed: October 2, 1959–present

Farm to Market Road 1605 (FM 1605) is located in Scurry County. It begins at an intersection with SH 350 in Snyder. FM 1605 runs along 37th Street in the southern part of the town before ending at an intersection with US 180/Bus. US 84/SH 208.

The current FM 1605 was designated on October 2, 1959, along the current route; at the time, Bus. US 84 was mainline US 84. It is a reestablishment of the FM 1605 that was designated in 1955.

=== FM 1605 (1951) ===
Farm to Market Road 1605
- Location: Brazoria County
- Existed: January 30, 1951–October 15, 1954

The first use of the FM 1605 designation was in Brazoria County on January 30, 1951, from FM 521 to SH 288. FM 1605 was cancelled on October 15, 1954, and became a portion of FM 1460 (now SH 332).

=== FM 1605 (1955) ===
Farm to Market Road 1605
- Location: Scurry County
- Existed: July 28, 1955–September 1, 1958

The second use of the FM 1605 designation was in Scurry County on July 28, 1955, running from SH 350 to US 84 (now Bus. US 84). FM 1605 was cancelled on September 1, 1958, as the county could not secure right of way.

=== FM 1605 (1958) ===
Farm to Market Road 1605
- Location: Taylor County
- Existed: October 31, 1958–October 2, 1959

The third use of the FM 1605 designation was in Taylor County on October 31, 1958, from US 83 to the Jones County line. FM 1605 was cancelled on October 2, 1959, and redesignated as FM 2404, as the routing of FM 1605 previously designated in 1955 now had its right of way secured.

== FM 1606 ==
Farm to Market Road 1606
- Location: Scurry and Fisher counties
- Length: 43.59 mi (70.15 km)
- Existed: 1951–present

Farm to Market Road 1606 (FM 1606) is located in Scurry and Fisher counties.

== FM 1607 ==
Farm to Market Road 1607
- Location: Scurry County
- Length: 7.717 mi (Note: The certified length given is shorter than the actual mileage, as the TxDOT description of FM 1601 considers it to be discontinuous at rather than concurrent with FM 1609.) (12.419 km)
- Existed: 1951–present

Farm to Market Road 1607 (FM 1607) is located in Scurry County.

FM 1607 begins at an intersection with FM 1606 west of Snyder. The highway runs east and has an overlap with FM 1609 and intersects FM 1611 before entering Snyder. FM 1607 runs along 37th Street to El Paso Avenue, and then along El Paso Avenue before ending at an intersection with US 180.

FM 1607 was designated on June 21, 1951, running from US 180 in Snyder westward to what is now FM 1611. The highway was extended further west to FM 1609 on October 29, 1953. On September 1, 1954, FM 1607 was extended west to FM 1606, absorbing FM 1608.

The entire route is in Scurry County.

Location	mi	km	Destinations	Notes
	0.0	0.0	FM 1606 / County Road 3102	
	3.0	4.8	FM 1609 south – Ira	West end of FM 1609 overlap
	3.5	5.6	FM 1609 north – Union	East end of FM 1609 overlap
	5.5	8.9	FM 1611 north / Block Line Road	
Snyder	8.2	13.2	US 180	
1.000 mi = 1.609 km; 1.000 km = 0.621 mi: Concurrency terminus

== FM 1608 ==
Farm to Market Road 1608
- Location: Knox and Baylor counties
- Length: 7.850 mi (12.633 km)
- Existed: November 3, 1972–present

Farm to Market Road 1608 (FM 1608) is located in Knox and Baylor counties.

=== FM 1608 (1951) ===
Farm to Market Road 1608
- Location: Scurry County
- Existed: June 21, 1951–September 1, 1954

A previous route numbered FM 1608 was designated on June 21, 1951, from FM 1606, 2 miles (3.2 km) south of US 180, east 3 miles (4.8 km) to FM 1609. FM 1608 was cancelled on September 1, 1954, and became a portion of FM 1607.

=== RM 1608 ===
Ranch to Market Road 1608
- Location: Medina County
- Existed: October 31, 1958–May 21, 1970

Ranch to Market Road 1608 (RM 1608) was designated on October 31, 1958, from FM 471, 1 mile (1.6 km) west of the Bexar County line, west 7.3 miles (11.7 km) to a road intersection. RM 1608 was cancelled on May 21, 1970, and transferred to FM 1283.

== FM 1609 ==
Farm to Market Road 1609
- Location: Scurry County
- Length: 10.0 mi (16.1 km)
- Existed: 1951–present

Farm to Market Road 1609 (FM 1609) is located in Scurry County.

== FM 1610 ==
Farm to Market Road 1610
- Location: Borden and Scurry counties
- Length: 18.303 mi (29.456 km)
- Existed: 1951–present

Farm to Market Road 1610 (FM 1610) is located in Borden and Scurry counties.

== FM 1611 ==
Farm to Market Road 1611
- Location: Scurry County
- Length: 9.37 mi (15.08 km)
- Existed: 1951–present

Farm to Market Road 1611 (FM 1611) is located in Scurry County.

== FM 1612 ==
Farm to Market Road 1612
- Location: Swisher and Hale counties
- Length: 6.214 mi (10.000 km)
- Existed: April 24, 1953–present

Farm to Market Road 1612 (FM 1612) is located in Swisher and Hale counties.

=== FM 1612 (1951) ===
Farm to Market Road 1612
- Location: Scurry County
- Existed: June 21, 1951–February 24, 1953

A previous route numbered FM 1612 was designated on June 21, 1951, from US 84 (now Bus. US 84) in Hermleigh northwest to US 180. FM 1612 was cancelled on February 24, 1953, and transferred to FM 644.

== FM 1613 ==
Farm to Market Road 1613
- Location: Scurry County
- Length: 4.699 mi (7.562 km)
- Existed: 1951–present

Farm to Market Road 1613 (FM 1613) is located in Scurry County.

== FM 1614 ==
Farm to Market Road 1614
- Location: Scurry County
- Length: 8.032 mi (12.926 km)
- Existed: 1951–present

Farm to Market Road 1614 (FM 1614) is located in Scurry County.

== FM 1615 ==
Farm to Market Road 1615
- Location: Henderson County
- Length: 10.456 mi (16.827 km)
- Existed: 1951–present

Farm to Market Road 1615 (FM 1615) is located in Henderson County.

== FM 1616 ==
Farm to Market Road 1616
- Location: Henderson County
- Length: 7.108 mi (11.439 km)
- Existed: 1951–present

Farm to Market Road 1616 (FM 1616) is located in Henderson County.

== FM 1617 ==
Farm to Market Road 1617
- Location: Trinity County
- Length: 1.768 mi (2.845 km)
- Existed: May 6, 1964–present

Farm to Market Road 1617 (FM 1617) is located in Trinity County.

=== FM 1617 (1951) ===
Farm to Market Road 1617
- Location: Henderson County
- Existed: May 23, 1951–December 11, 1961

A previous route numbered FM 1617 was designated on May 23, 1951, from FM 316 at Payne Springs west and north 6 miles (9.7 km) to FM 85. FM 1617 was cancelled on October 3, 1961, and transferred to FM 90, which also replaced the portion of FM 85 north of FM 1250.

== FM 1618 ==
Farm to Market Road 1618
- Location: Leon County
- Length: 2.678 mi (4.310 km)
- Existed: March 26, 1953–present

Farm to Market Road 1618 (FM 1618) is located in Leon County.

=== FM 1618 (1951) ===
Farm to Market Road 1618
- Location: Garza County
- Existed: May 23, 1951–February 24, 1953

A previous route numbered FM 1618 was designated on May 23, 1951, from Loop 46 at Post northeast 5.0 miles (8.0 km) to a road intersection 0.7 miles (1.1 km) north of Yellow House Fork of the Brazos River. On November 20, 1951, the road was extended northeast 2.5 miles (4.0 km). FM 1618 was cancelled on February 24, 1953, and transferred to FM 651.

== FM 1619 ==
Farm to Market Road 1619
- Location: Hall and Childress counties
- Length: 13.086 mi (21.060 km)
- Existed: 1951–present

Farm to Market Road 1619 (FM 1619) is located in Hall and Childress counties.

== FM 1620 ==
Farm to Market Road 1620
- Location: Guadalupe County
- Length: 1.43 mi (2.30 km)
- Existed: 1951–present

Farm to Market Road 1620 (FM 1620) is located in Guadalupe County.

== FM 1621 ==
Farm to Market Road 1621
- Location: Kendall County
- Length: 4.895 mi (7.878 km)
- Existed: October 31, 1958–present

Farm to Market Road 1621 (FM 1621) is located in Kendall County.

=== FM 1621 (1951) ===
Farm to Market Road 1621
- Location: Guadalupe County
- Existed: May 23, 1951–August 8, 1958

A previous route numbered FM 1621 was designated on May 23, 1951, from US 81 at Selma southeast to FM 78 at Schertz. FM 1621 was cancelled on August 8, 1958, and transferred to FM 1518.

== FM 1622 ==
Farm to Market Road 1622
- Location: Yoakum County
- Length: 14.119 mi (22.722 km)
- Existed: December 17, 1952–present

Farm to Market Road 1622 (FM 1622) is located in Yoakum County. It was numbered on January 29, 1953.

=== FM 1622 (1951) ===
Farm to Market Road 1622
- Location: Blanco and Kendall counties
- Existed: May 23, 1951–January 29, 1953

A previous route numbered FM 1622 was designated on May 23, 1951, from US 281 south of Twin Sisters west to Kendall (now Kendalia). FM 1622 was cancelled on January 29, 1953, and transferred to FM 473.

== RM 1623 ==
Ranch to Market Road 1623
- Location: Gillespie and Blanco counties
- Length: 23.386 mi (Note: The certified length given is shorter than the actual mileage, as the TxDOT description of RM 1623 considers it to be discontinuous at US 290.) (37.636 km)
- Existed: May 23, 1951 (Note: RM 1623 was originally designated as FM 1623 from 1951 to 1969.)–present

Ranch to Market Road 1623 (RM 1623) is located in Gillespie and Blanco counties. It is 23.4 miles (37.7 km) long.

RM 1623 begins in eastern Gillespie County at an intersection with RM 2721. It travels to the south into Stonewall, where it crosses Ranch Road 1, and has a one-block eastward concurrency with US 290 before continuing southward. It then turns to the southeast and crosses into Blanco County. The route intersects RM 1888 before turning to the east and running along the north bank of the Blanco River into Blanco. The RM 1623 designation ends at US 281 in central Blanco; the roadway continues as Loop 163.

RM 1623 was first designated in Blanco County on May 23, 1951, as Farm to Market Road 1623 (FM 1623), and ran from US 281 in Blanco to the west approximately 5.0 mi (8.0 km). Its length was extended to 10.3 mi (16.6 km) on October 28, 1953, and increased again to 13.6 mi (21.9 km) on September 29, 1954; the designation ended at the Gillespie County line. The extension into Gillespie County and to US 290 was approved on August 24, 1955. The route was redesignated on November 26, 1969, as RM 1623, the same day the extension to RM 2721 was added.

Junction list

County	Location	mi	km	Destinations	Notes
Gillespie		0.0	0.0	RM 2721	Northern terminus (Note: The section between RM 2721 and US 290 in Stonewall is signed south–north, but the majority of the route is signed west–east.)
Gillespie	Stonewall	3.0	4.8	RR 1 – Lyndon B. Johnson National Historical Park	
Gillespie	Stonewall	3.4	5.5	US 290 west – Fredericksburg	West end of US 290 concurrency
Gillespie	Stonewall	3.6	5.8	US 290 east – Johnson City	East end of US 290 concurrency
Blanco		18.4	29.6	RM 1888 (River Road) – Luckenbach	
Blanco	Blanco	23.6	38.0	US 281 / Loop 163 – Johnson City, San Antonio	Eastern terminus
1.000 mi = 1.609 km; 1.000 km = 0.621 mi

== FM 1624 ==
Farm to Market Road 1624
- Location: Lee County
- Length: 17.878 mi (28.772 km)
- Existed: 1951–present

Farm to Market Road 1624 (FM 1624) is located in Lee County.

FM 1624 was designated on May 23, 1951, from SH 21 south of Lincoln northwestward 6.5 mi (10.5 km) toward Fedor to the south end of the Yegua Creek Bridge. On November 20, 1951, FM 1624 was extended northwest 1.9 mi (3.1 km) to Fedor School. On May 21, 1953, FM 1624 was extended eastward from SH 21 to US 77. On June 28, 1963, FM 1624 was extended east to Loop 123 and FM 696 in Lexington.

== FM 1625 ==
Farm to Market Road 1625
- Location: Travis County
- Length: 5.008 mi (8.060 km)
- Existed: 1951–present

Farm to Market Road 1625 (FM 1625) is located in Travis County. It is 5.1 miles (8.21 km) in length.

FM 1625 begins at an intersection in Creedmoor. It passes FM 1327 and then continues north 4.7 miles (7.6 km) to its terminus at a dead end right next to the intersection of US 183 and William Cannon Drive, near the community of Colton south of Austin-Bergstrom International Airport.

FM 1625 was originally assigned on May 23, 1951, to a road segment between FM 1327 in Creedmoor and the then-current alignment of SH 29 in mid-1951. This segment was then combined with FM 1327 on November 20, 1951. The new alignment was assigned on November 20, 1951; the section south of FM 1327 was originally part of FM 1327.

FM 1625 originally had its northern terminus at US 183 in Colton, but it was truncated 200 feet (61 m) to a dead end circa 2020 after William Cannon Drive was extended to intersect US 183.

Junction list

The entire route is in Travis County.

Location	mi	km	Destinations	Notes
	0.0	0.0	Williamson Road / Old Lockhart Road	
Creedmoor	0.3	0.48	FM 1327 to I-35 / US 183	
Colton	5.0	8.0	Dead end	Within 200 feet southwest of the intersection of US 183 and William Cannon Drive
1.000 mi = 1.609 km; 1.000 km = 0.621 mi

== FM 1626 ==
Farm to Market Road 1626
- Location: Hays and Travis counties
- Length: 13.361 mi (21.502 km)
- Existed: 1951–present

Farm to Market Road 1626 (FM 1626) is located in Travis and Hays counties. The road is 13.4 miles (21.6 km) long.

The road begins at a junction with I-35 in Kyle. It runs north, intersecting RM 967 in Hays, just west of Buda, and continues to run north before turning east. It runs east through Manchaca before ending at another intersection with I-35 in southern Austin, just east of San Leanna.

Construction began in fall 2013 to expand the roadway from two lanes to four lanes with a center turn lane. The project was expected to be completed in fall 2014; however, it is still incomplete as of December 2021.

FM 1626 was designated on May 23, 1951, from US 81 (now I-35) west 2.7 miles (4.3 km) to Manchaca. On May 6, 1964, FM 1626 was extended to RM 967. On October 26, 1983, FM 1626 was extended to FM 2770. On May 24, 2007, FM 1626 was extended south to I-35.

Junction list

County	Location	mi	km	Destinations	Notes
Hays	Kyle	0.0	0.0	I-35	I-35 exit 215
Hays		3.0	4.8	FM 2770 (Jack C. Hays Trail) – Jack C. Hays High School	
Hays	Hays	6.3	10.1	RM 967 – Buda	
Hays				SH 45 Toll	Seagull intersection
Travis	Austin	13.3	21.4	I-35	Access to/from southbound I-35 frontage road only
1.000 mi = 1.609 km; 1.000 km = 0.621 mi

== FM 1627 ==
Farm to Market Road 1627
- Location: Bexar County
- Existed: May 23, 1951–August 13, 1964

Farm to Market Road 1627 (FM 1627) was located in Bexar County. No highway currently uses the FM 1627 designation.

FM 1627 was designated on May 23, 1951, from US 81 (now I-35) near Selma to SH 218 at a distance of 0.4 miles (0.64 km). The highway was cancelled on August 13, 1964, and replaced by FM 1604 (now Loop 1604).

== FM 1628 ==
Farm to Market Road 1628
- Location: Bexar County
- Length: 1.804 mi (2.903 km)
- Existed: 1951–present

Farm to Market Road 1628 (FM 1628) is located in Bexar County.

== FM 1629 ==
Farm to Market Road 1629
- Location: Fannin County
- Length: 2.864 mi (4.609 km)
- Existed: June 23, 1953–present

Farm to Market Road 1629 (FM 1629) is located in Fannin County.

=== FM 1629 (1951) ===
Farm to Market Road 1629
- Location: Cooke County
- Existed: May 23, 1951–February 6, 1953

A previous route numbered FM 1629 was designated on May 23, 1951, from FM 1203 at Callisburg east and north 5.0 mi (8.0 km) to a road intersection 1 mile (1.6 km) south of Sturgeon. FM 1629 was cancelled on February 6, 1953, and transferred to FM 1203 (now FM 678).

== FM 1630 ==
Farm to Market Road 1630
- Location: Montague and Cooke counties
- Length: 21.081 mi (33.927 km)
- Existed: 1951–present

Farm to Market Road 1630 (FM 1630) is a two-lane highway connecting the farming community of Hardy, near Forestburg in Montague County to FM 51 3 miles (4.8 km) south of Gainesville in Cooke County. FM 1630 terminates at FM 677 at its western end and at FM 51 at its eastern end.

FM 1630 was designated on May 23, 1951, from FM 51 southwest 4.1 miles (6.6 km) to a road intersection. On November 20 of that year, FM 1630 was extended southwest 3.8 miles (6.1 km) to another road intersection. On August 24, 1955, FM 1630 was extended west to FM 677.

== RM 1631 ==
Ranch to Market Road 1631
- Location: Gillespie County
- Length: 15.917 mi (25.616 km)
- Existed: May 23, 1951 (Note: RM 1631 was originally designated as FM 1631 from 1951 to 1956.)–present

Ranch to Market Road 1631 (RM 1631) is located in Gillespie County.

It was originally Farm to Market Road 1631.

== FM 1632 ==
Farm to Market Road 1632
- Location: Tyler County
- Length: 5.177 mi (8.332 km)
- Existed: May 2, 1962–present

Farm to Market Road 1632 (FM 1632) is located in Tyler County.

=== FM 1632 (1951) ===
Farm to Market Road 1632
- Location: Hockley County
- Existed: May 23, 1951–January 13, 1960

A previous route numbered FM 1632 was designated on May 23, 1951, from SH 290 (now SH 116) at Smyer south 10.0 miles (16.1 km) to a county road. On March 31, 1955, the road was extended south 2.4 miles (3.9 km) to FM 41. FM 1632 was cancelled on January 13, 1960, and transferred to FM 168.

== FM 1633 ==
Farm to Market Road 1633
- Location: Limestone County
- Length: 9.304 mi (14.973 km)
- Existed: 1951–present

Farm to Market Road 1633 (FM 1633) is located in Limestone County.

== FM 1634 ==
Farm to Market Road 1634
- Location: Wichita County
- Length: 2.694 mi (4.336 km)
- Existed: May 5, 1966–present

Farm to Market Road 1634 (FM 1634) is located in Wichita County.

=== FM 1634 (1951) ===
Farm to Market Road 1634
- Location: Cochran and Hockley counties
- Existed: May 23, 1951–February 10, 1966

A previous route numbered FM 1634 was designated on May 23, 1951, from FM 300, 2.5 miles (4.0 km) south of SH 290 (now SH 116), west 7.1 miles (11.4 km) to the Cochran County line. Four months later the road was extended west 0.4 miles (0.64 km) to FM 769. FM 1634 was cancelled on February 10, 1966, and became a portion of FM 300.

== FM 1635 ==
Farm to Market Road 1635
- Location: Cass County
- Length: 1.261 mi (2.029 km)
- Existed: June 10, 1966–present

Farm to Market Road 1635 (FM 1635) is located in Cass County.

=== FM 1635 (1951) ===
Farm to Market Road 1635
- Location: Hockley County
- Existed: May 23, 1951–February 10, 1966

A previous route numbered FM 1635 was designated on May 23, 1951, from SH 290 (now SH 116), 6.2 miles (10.0 km) west of Levelland south 2.5 miles (4.0 km) to then-proposed FM 1634. FM 1635 was cancelled on February 10, 1966, and became a portion of FM 303.

== FM 1636 ==
Farm to Market Road 1636
- Location: Jones County
- Length: 18.922 mi (30.452 km)
- Existed: July 28, 1955–present

Farm to Market Road 1636 (FM 1636) is located in Jones County.

=== FM 1636 (1951) ===
Farm to Market Road 1636
- Location: McLennan County
- Existed: May 23, 1951–October 18, 1954

A previous route numbered FM 1636 was designated on May 23, 1951, from US 81, 2 miles (3.2 km) north of Waco to northwest 11 miles (18 km) to Gholson. This was corrected to 12.3 miles (19.8 km) six months later. FM 1636 was cancelled on October 18, 1954, and became a portion of FM 1244 (now FM 933; FM 1244 was reassigned to the old route of FM 933).

== FM 1637 ==
Farm to Market Road 1637
- Location: Bosque and McLennan counties
- Length: 19.6 mi (31.5 km)
- Existed: 1951–present

Farm to Market Road 1637 (FM 1637) runs from FM 56 to Lake Shore Drive in Waco.

FM 1637 begins at an intersection with FM 56 north of Valley Mills and runs parallel in close proximity to the North Bosque River from here to FM 185 (North River Crossing Road) in Waco. In Waco, the highway is known as China Spring Road from FM 185 to FM 3051, running near Lake Waco and along the northern boundary of Waco Regional Airport before turning in a more southward direction. At FM 3051, FM 1637 is known as 19th Street and crosses over the Bosque River and runs through less developed areas of Waco before ending at Lake Shore Drive.

FM 1637 was designated on May 23, 1951, running northwest from US 84 to the community of Earth. On October 26, 1954, the highway was extended 4.5 miles (7.2 km) to a road intersection north of China Spring. On June 25, 1965, FM 1637 was extended another 6.2 miles (10.0 km), absorbing FM 2704. On September 30, 1970, the highway was relocated around China Spring, adding a loop through that town. On June 27, 1995, the section of FM 185 to US 84 was transferred to Urban Road 1637. On April 2, 2017, the section from Lake Shore Drive to US 84 was given to the city of Waco. This section is now 19th Street, 18th Street, Lyle Avenue/Herring Avenue, and 4th Street/5th Street.

Junction list

County	Location	mi	km	Destinations	Notes
Bosque		0.0	0.0	FM 56 – Valley Mills, Laguna Park	
McLennan		9.9	15.9	FM Spur 1637 east – China Spring	
McLennan	Waco	13.0	20.9	FM 185 south (River Crossing Road) – Crawford	
McLennan	Waco	13.1	21.1	FM Spur 1637 west (Old China Spring Road) – China Spring	
McLennan	Waco	15.0	24.1	FM 2490 north (Wortham Bend Road)	
McLennan	Waco	18.2	29.3	FM 3051 east (Steinbeck Bend Drive) – Bellmead, Airport	
McLennan	Waco	19.6	31.5	Lake Shore Drive	
1.000 mi = 1.609 km; 1.000 km = 0.621 mi

== FM 1638 ==
Farm to Market Road 1638
- Location: Nacogdoches County
- Length: 7.215 mi (11.611 km)
- Existed: May 23, 1951–present

Farm to Market Road 1638 (FM 1638) is a 7.2-mile (11.6 km) route in Nacogdoches County. It connects US 59 Bus. in Nacogdoches with FM 698 northwest of Redfield.

FM 1638 was designated on May 23, 1951, from the Nacogdoches city limits north to FM 698. On January 23, 1956, it was extended southeast to US 59 (now US 59 Bus.).

== FM 1639 ==
Farm to Market Road 1639
- Location: Rusk and Gregg counties
- Length: 3.702 mi (5.958 km)
- Existed: May 23, 1951–present

Farm to Market Road 1639 (FM 1639) runs from Farm to Market Road 3053 (FM 3053) north of Overton northeast to Texas State Highway 31 (SH 31) east of Kilgore.

FM 1639 was designated on May 23, 1951, "officially" running from Texas State Highway 135 (but actually from Farm to Market Road 850) (Note: While the southern terminus of Farm to Market Road 1639 was initially officially listed as being at Texas State Highway 135, it was actually at Farm to Market Road 850. This discrepancy was not corrected until February 1, 1964.) in Overton north to SH 31. On December 20, 1963, FM 1639 was extended about 1.5 miles (2.4 km) east-northeast over the former routing of SH 31 to the current SH 31 route.

February 1, 1964, the official southern terminus was finally corrected to read "FM 850". A little more than two years later, on May 5, 1966, Farm to Market Road 3053 (FM 3053) was established, running north-northeast from a point on FM 1639 {approximately 5 miles [8.0 km] north-northwest of Red Level and 7.5 miles [12.1 km] north of Overton) to Interstate 20. On January 31, 1972, the section south of FM 1639's junction with FM 3053 was transferred to FM 3053.

== FM 1640 ==
Farm to Market Road 1640
- Location: Fort Bend County
- Length: 3.83 mi (6.16 km)
- Existed: 1951–present

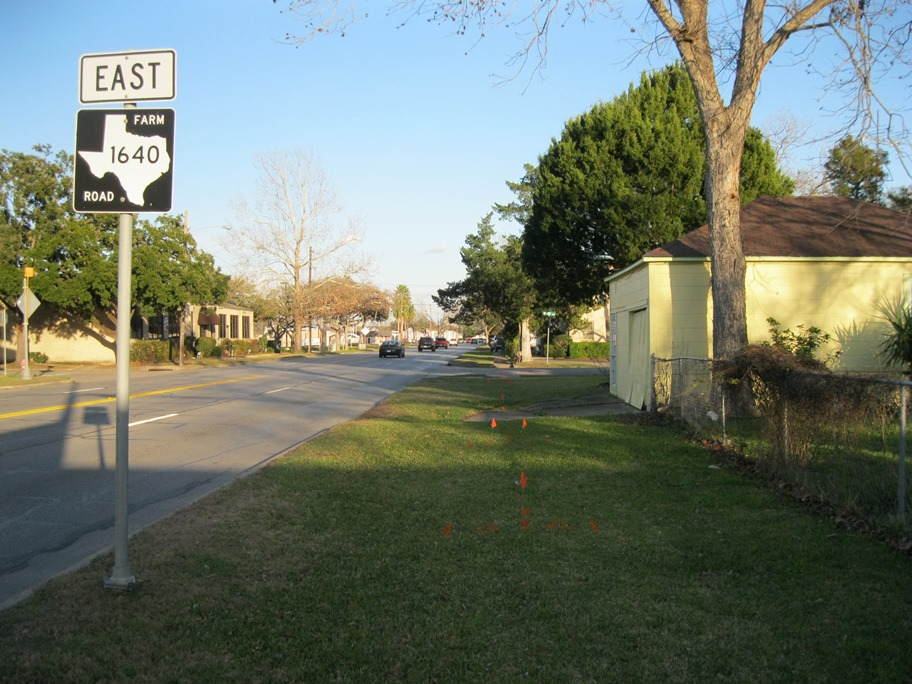
FM 1640 between 4th and 5th Streets

Farm to Market Road 1640 (FM 1640) is located in Fort Bend County. The highway begins at Spur 529 in Rosenberg and follows a city street east to FM 762 in Richmond.

FM 1640 begins at Spur 529 on the western edge of Rosenberg and follows Avenue I east for most of its length. From Spur 529 to the traffic light at SH 36 or First Street is 0.7 miles (1.1 km). From SH 36 to the slight jog at Millie Street is 1.0 mile (1.6 km). From Millie Street to the traffic signal at Reading Road is 1.1 miles (1.8 km). This stretch of Avenue I passes the administration building for the Lamar Consolidated Independent School District and Traylor Stadium's south grandstand. From Reading Road to the intersection with FM 2218 is 0.7 miles (1.1 km). In the last 200 yards (183 m) before the intersection, FM 1640 changes direction from east to northeast. In this area, there are several businesses including a Valero filling station and a Walmart on the south side of the highway and a Wharton County Junior College campus on the north side. After going 0.3 miles (0.5 km) to the northeast, FM 1640 crosses Union Pacific Railroad tracks and ends at a traffic light at FM 762 in front of the George Memorial Library. The continuation of the road to the northeast is called Golfview Drive.

FM 1640 was originally authorized on May 23, 1951, to run from FM 762 in Richmond west to Jeanetta Street in Rosenberg, which was a distance of 2.2 miles (3.5 km). On January 1, 1966, the highway was extended an additional 1.7 miles (2.7 km) along Avenue I to US 59. The connection to US 59 was 0.25 miles (0.40 km) west of the US 59 intersection with SH 36. The old route along Millie Street from Avenue I to US 59 became a spur connection. A 1955 USGS map showed that US 59 shared its right-of-way with US 90 Alt., which still passes through downtown Richmond and Rosenberg. US 59 split off from US 90 Alt. on the west side of Rosenberg in 1955 and headed southwest. By the time the 1971 USGS map was published, US 59 bypassed Rosenberg to the south and Spur 529 used the former right-of-way of US 59 west of Rosenberg. On April 3, 2006, the spur connection to US 90 Alt. at Millie Street was removed from the state highway system. (Note: The TxDOT website fails to mention that the western end of FM 1640 is at Spur 529.) In 2017, FM 1640 and US 90 Alt. were converted to a one-way pair in Rosenberg.

Junction list

The entire route is in Fort Bend County.

Location	mi	km	Destinations	Notes
Rosenberg	0.0	0.0	Spur 529	Western terminus of FM 1640
Rosenberg	0.7	1.1	SH 36 (First Street) – Wallis, Needville	
Richmond	3.5	5.6	FM 2218 (B.F. Terry Boulevard) – Pleak	
Richmond	3.8	6.1	FM 762 – Crabb	Eastern terminus of FM 1640
1.000 mi = 1.609 km; 1.000 km = 0.621 mi

== FM 1641 ==
Farm to Market Road 1641
- Location: Kaufman County
- Length: 5.348 mi (8.607 km)
- Existed: 1951–present

Farm to Market Road 1641 (FM 1641) is located in Kaufman County. It is known locally as Talty Road. FM 1641 begins at an intersection with FM 148 in Talty, with southbound traffic on FM 1641 continuing straight at the intersection traveling on northbound FM 148. The highway travels through the city before meeting I-20 at exit 493. FM 1641 continues to Forney to an intersection with FM 548 just south of US 80.

FM 1641 was designated on May 23, 1951, from US 80 to FM 148 in Talty. On January 18, 1960, the section from FM 740 Spur to US 80 was transferred to the new FM 688, along with FM 740 Spur itself.

== FM 1642 ==
Farm to Market Road 1642
- Location: Collingsworth and Childress counties
- Length: 14.652 mi (23.580 km)
- Existed: October 28, 1953–present

Farm to Market Road 1642 (FM 1642) is located in Collingsworth and Childress counties.

=== FM 1642 (1951) ===
Farm to Market Road 1642
- Location: Brown and Mills counties
- Existed: May 23, 1951–November 12, 1953

A previous route numbered FM 1642 was designated on May 23, 1951, from SH 16, 0.3 miles (0.48 km) south of Priddy, west 10.2 miles (16.4 km) to a road intersection 1 mile (1.6 km) west of Democrat. On December 17, 1952, the road was extended west 7.4 miles (11.9 km) to FM 590 at Zephyr. On August 25, 1953, the western terminus was moved to US 84. FM 1642 was cancelled on November 12, 1953, and transferred to FM 218.

== FM 1643 ==
Farm to Market Road 1643
- Location: Wood County
- Length: 5.776 mi (9.296 km)
- Existed: May 2, 1962–present

Farm to Market Road 1643 (FM 1643) is located in Wood County.

=== FM 1643 (1951) ===
Farm to Market Road 1643
- Location: Polk County
- Existed: May 23, 1951–February 21, 1958

A previous route numbered FM 1643 was designated on May 23, 1951, from Loop 177 at Moscow west 5.9 miles (9.5 km) to a road intersection. On November 5, 1952, the eastern terminus was moved to US 59 as a section of Loop 177 was transferred to FM 1643. On October 13, 1954, the road was extended west 4.7 miles (7.6 km) to FM 350 near Colita. FM 1643 was cancelled on February 21, 1958, and transferred to FM 350.

== FM 1644 ==
Farm to Market Road 1644
- Location: Robertson County
- Length: 23.413 mi (37.680 km)
- Existed: 1951–present

Farm to Market Road 1644 (FM 1644) is located in Robertson County.

== FM 1645 ==
Farm to Market Road 1645
- Location: Shelby County
- Length: 13.764 mi (22.151 km)
- Existed: May 25, 1951–present

Farm to Market Road 1645 (FM 1645) is a 13.8-mile (22.2 km) route in Shelby County. It connects the north end of CR 1211, at a point roughly 1.8 miles (2.9 km) south of Arcadia), with US 59/US 84 east of Timpson.

FM 1645 was designated May 25, 1951, from SH 87 in Huber to US 84 east of Timpson. On May 2, 1962, it was extended approximately 2.9 miles (4.7 km) south of Huber. On September 29, 1977, the route was extended approximately 1.9 miles (3.1 km) south to Arcadia; it also replaced FM 3231, which had extended approximately 1.8 miles (2.9 km) south from Arcadia.

== FM 1646 ==
Farm to Market Road 1646
- Location: Stonewall County
- Length: 10.657 mi (17.151 km)
- Existed: 1951–present

Farm to Market Road 1646 (FM 1646) is located in Stonewall County.

=== FM 1646 (1951) ===
Farm to Market Road 1646
- Location: Stephens County
- Existed: May 23, 1951–August 29, 1951

A previous route numbered FM 1646 was designated on May 23, 1951, from SH 6, 6.0 miles (9.7 km) south of Breckenridge, eastward to a road intersection (current FM 1852). FM 1646 was cancelled on August 29, 1951, and transferred to FM 576.

== FM 1647 ==
Farm to Market Road 1647
- Location: Wood County
- Length: 4.973 mi (8.003 km)
- Existed: 1951–present

Farm to Market Road 1647 (FM 1647) is located in Wood County.

== FM 1648 ==
Farm to Market Road 1648
- Location: Nacogdoches County
- Length: 6.253 mi (10.063 km)
- Existed: October 31, 1958–present

Farm to Market Road 1648 (FM 1648) is located in Nacogdoches County.

=== FM 1648 (1951) ===
Farm to Market Road 1648
- Location: San Saba County
- Existed: May 23, 1951–November 29, 1957

A previous route numbered FM 1648 was designated on May 23, 1951, from SH 16 in Cherokee west 10.5 miles (16.9 km) to a county road. On November 21, 1956, the road was extended west 6.0 miles (9.7 km) to a road intersection. On October 31, 1957, the road was extended west to Pontotoc, but FM 1648 was cancelled on November 29, 1957, and transferred to FM 501, which became RM 501 that day.

== FM 1649 ==
Farm to Market Road 1649
- Location: Upshur County
- Length: 10.746 mi (17.294 km)
- Existed: 1951–present

Farm to Market Road 1649 (FM 1649) is located in Upshur County.

== FM 1650 ==
Farm to Market Road 1650
- Location: Upshur and Gregg counties
- Length: 9.061 mi (14.582 km)
- Existed: 1951–present

Farm to Market Road 1650 (FM 1650) is located primarily in Upshur County. The western terminus of FM 1650 is east of Gilmer, at an intersection with SH 154. The route generally travels to the southeast and passes through unincorporated communities including Bethlehem. It ends at an intersection with U.S. Highway 259 (US 259) shortly after entering Gregg County.

FM 1650 was designated along its current routing on May 23, 1951, from SH 154 to SH 26. SH 26 would be canceled in its entirety and be replaced by US 259 when that route was commissioned on December 12, 1962.

Junction list

County	Location	mi	km	Destinations	Notes
Upshur		0.0	0.0	SH 154 – Gilmer, Harleton	Western terminus
Upshur		3.1	5.0	FM 726 south – Glenwood	West end of FM 726 concurrency
Upshur		3.3	5.3	FM 726 north – Old Diana	East end of FM 726 concurrency
Gregg		9.0	14.5	US 259 – Ore City, Longview	Eastern terminus
1.000 mi = 1.609 km; 1.000 km = 0.621 mi

== FM 1651 ==
Farm to Market Road 1651
- Location: Van Zandt County
- Length: 13.008 mi (20.934 km)
- Existed: May 23, 1951–present

Farm to Market Road 1651 (FM 1651) is located in Van Zandt County.

== FM 1652 ==
Farm to Market Road 1652
- Location: Van Zandt County
- Length: 6.036 mi (9.714 km)
- Existed: May 23, 1951–present

Farm to Market Road 1652 (FM 1652) is located entirely Van Zandt County.

== FM 1653 ==
Farm to Market Road 1653
- Location: Van Zandt County
- Length: 5.666 mi (9.119 km)
- Existed: May 23, 1951–present

Farm to Market Road 1653 (FM 1653) is located in Van Zandt County.

== FM 1654 ==
Farm to Market Road 1654
- Location: Van Zandt County
- Existed: May 23, 1951–December 18, 1990

Farm to Market Road 1654 (FM 1654) was located in Van Zandt County. There is currently no highway using the FM 1654 designation.

FM 1654 was designated on May 23, 1951, from SH 198 south of Canton to SH 64 southeast of Canton, and was signed (but not designated) as part of SH 243 upon completion. FM 1654 was cancelled on August 29, 1990, as the SH 243 designation became official.

== FM 1655 ==
Farm to Market Road 1655
- Location: Wise and Montague counties
- Length: 25.282 mi (40.687 km)
- Existed: May 23, 1951–present

Farm to Market Road 1655 (FM 1655) is a two-lane highway connecting various farming areas of Wise and Montague counties. It runs from U.S. Highway 380 (US 380), near Bridgeport, to FM 455, near Forestburg. Towns served by FM 1655 include Bridgeport, Alvord, and Chico in Wise County and Forestburg in Montague County.

FM 1655 was designated on May 23, 1951, from US 81 in Alvord to a county road 0.5 miles (0.80 km) south of the Wise–Montague county line. On February 6, 1953, FM 1655 was extended south and west to SH 24/SH 114 (now SH 101) in Chico, replacing FM 1881. On September 27, 1960, FM 1655 was extended northeast to FM 455. On August 29, 1961, SH 24 and SH 114 were relocated in Chico, causing FM 1655 to lose 0.2 miles (0.32 km). On Match 27, 1963, the section of FM 1655 from FM 1810 to SH 24/SH 114 was transferred to FM 1810, and the section of FM 1810 from what was then FM 2403 to SH 24 (now US 380) was transferred to FM 1655.

== FM 1656 ==
Farm to Market Road 1656
- Location: Shelby County
- Length: 1.669 mi (2.686 km)
- Existed: May 2, 1962–present

Farm to Market Road 1656 (FM 1656) is located in Shelby County.

=== FM 1656 (1951) ===
Farm to Market Road 1656
- Location: Wise County
- Existed: May 23, 1951–July 5, 1951

The first use of the FM 1656 designation was in Wise County, from FM 51 via Slidell to the Denton County line. FM 1656 was cancelled two months later and became a portion of FM 425 (now FM 455).

=== FM 1656 (1951–1960) ===
Farm to Market Road 1656
- Location: Lynn County
- Existed: July 25, 1951–November 15, 1960

The next use of the FM 1656 designation was in Lynn County, from FM 211, 2.5 miles (4.0 km) southeast of Wilson, south 4.3 miles (6.9 km) to a road intersection. On September 21, 1955, the road was extended south 5.0 miles (8.0 km) to US 380. FM 1656 was cancelled on November 15, 1960, and transferred to FM 1054.

== FM 1657 ==
Farm to Market Road 1657
- Location: Fisher County
- Length: 7.084 mi (11.401 km)
- Existed: July 28, 1955–present

Farm to Market Road 1657 (FM 1657) is a designation that has been used four times. The current use is in Fisher County, from FM 611 south to US 180.

=== FM 1657 (1951–1952) ===
Farm to Market Road 1657
- Location: Wise County
- Existed: May 23, 1951–January 3, 1952

The first use of the FM 1657 designation was in Wise County, from FM 51 to Greenwood. Eight months later FM 1657 was cancelled and transferred to FM 455 (now FM 1204).

=== FM 1657 (1951–1953) ===
Farm to Market Road 1657
- Location: Hood County
- Existed: November 20, 1951–February 6, 1953

The second use of the FM 1657 designation was in Hood County, from SH 144 in Granbury southwest 4.7 miles (7.6 km) to a road intersection. FM 1657 was cancelled on February 6, 1953, and transferred to FM 51.

=== FM 1657 (1953–1954) ===
Farm to Market Road 1657
- Location: McLennan County
- Existed: February 24, 1953–October 26, 1954

The third use of the FM 1657 designation was in McLennan County, from SH 6, 3.5 miles (5.6 km) northwest of Speegleville, east 8 miles (13 km) to FM 1637 at Bosqueville. FM 1657 was cancelled on October 26, 1954, and removed from the highway system in exchange for extending FM 185.

== FM 1658 ==
Farm to Market Road 1658
- Location: Wise County
- Length: 7.050 mi (11.346 km)
- Existed: May 23, 1951–present

Farm to Market Road 1658 (FM 1658) is located in Wise County.

== FM 1659 ==
Farm to Market Road 1659
- Location: Llano County
- Existed: May 23, 1951–October 29, 2004

Farm to Market Road 1659 (FM 1659) was located in Llano County. There is currently no highway using the FM 1659 designation.

FM 1659 was designated on May 23, 1951, from FM 386 (later FM 734 and RM 734, now SH 71) east and south via Valley Spring to FM 386. FM 1659 was cancelled on October 29, 2004, and returned to Llano County.

== FM 1660 ==
Farm to Market Road 1660
- Location: Williamson County
- Length: 18.47 mi (Note: The certified length given is shorter than the actual mileage, as the TxDOT description of FM 1660 considers it to be discontinuous at US 79.) (29.72 km)
- Existed: May 23, 1951–present

Farm to Market Road 1660 (FM 1660) is located in Williamson County. It runs about 19.3 miles (31.1 km) from Jonah southeastward to a point near Coupland. When the road was created on May 23, 1951, it ran from Hutto southeast 5.5 miles (8.9 km) to Norman's Crossing. On September 29, 1954, the road was extended to join with FM 973 at Rice's Crossing. On December 13, 1956, the portion of FM 973 that ran toward Coupland was redesignated as FM 1660, but signage did not change until the travel map was published. On June 28, 1963, the road was extended north from Hutto to Jonah.

Junction list

The entire route is in Williamson County.

Location	mi	km	Destinations	Notes
	0.0	0.0	SH 95 – Taylor, Elgin	
Rice's Crossing	3.4	5.5	FM 973 – Taylor, Manor	
Norman's Crossing	5.7	9.2	FM 3349 north	
Hutto	11.2	18.0	US 79 north – Taylor	South end of US 79 overlap
Hutto	11.4	18.3	US 79 south – Round Rock	North end of US 79 overlap
Jonah	18.7	30.1	SH 29 – Georgetown, Taylor	
1.000 mi = 1.609 km; 1.000 km = 0.621 mi: Concurrency terminus

== FM 1661 ==
Farm to Market Road 1661
- Location: Haskell and Jones counties
- Length: 23.515 mi (37.844 km)
- Existed: May 23, 1951–present

Farm to Market Road 1661 (FM 1661) is located in Haskell and Jones counties.

== FM 1662 ==
Farm to Market Road 1662
- Location: Rusk County
- Length: 11.224 mi (18.063 km)
- Existed: October 29, 1953–present

Farm to Market Road 1662 (FM 1662) is located in Rusk County.

=== FM 1662 (1951) ===
Farm to Market Road 1662
- Location: Hill and Limestone Counties
- Existed: May 23, 1951–November 13, 1953

A previous route numbered FM 1662 was designated on May 23, 1951, from FM 73 at Prairie Hill northwest 9.2 miles (14.8 km) to the Hill County line. On February 21, 1952, the road was extended 2.0 miles (3.2 km) northwest to SH 31 in Mount Calm, replacing Spur 117. FM 1662 was cancelled on November 13, 1953, and transferred to FM 737 (now FM 339).

== FM 1663 ==
Farm to Market Road 1663
- Location: Chambers County
- Length: 16.744 mi (26.947 km)
- Existed: August 15, 1955–present

Farm to Market Road 1663 (FM 1663) is located in Chambers County. It runs from SH 61 at Hankamer to SH 73/SH 124 at Winnie.

FM 1663 was designated on August 15, 1955, from the north end of FM 1724, 3 miles (4.8 km) east of Hankamer, east 3.2 miles (5.1 km) to a road intersection. On November 21, 1956, the road was extended east and south 4.3 miles (6.9 km). On October 31, 1957, the road was extended south to SH 73-T (now SH 65) and west to SH 61 at Hankamer. On May 25, 1966, the section from FM 1410 south 5.0 miles (8.0 km) to SH 73-T was transferred to FM 1410 while FM 1663 was rerouted east to I-10/Spur 5 at Winnie, replacing FM 2990. On August 4, 1988, the road was extended to SH 73/SH 124 at Winnie, replacing Spur 5.

=== FM 1663 (1951) ===
Farm to Market Road 1663
- Location: Limestone County
- Existed: May 23, 1951–October 18, 1954

A previous route numbered FM 1663 was designated on May 23, 1951, from SH 14 at Kosse northwest 5.5 miles (8.9 km) to a road intersection at Coit. FM 1663 was cancelled on October 18, 1954, and became a portion of FM 339.

== FM 1664 ==
Farm to Market Road 1664
- Location: Maverick County
- Length: 4.773 mi (7.681 km)
- Existed: May 23, 1951–present

Farm to Market Road 1664 (FM 1664) is located in Maverick County. It runs from US 277 near Quemado westward, southward, and eastward to another point on US 277 near Normandy.

FM 1664 was designated on May 23, 1951, along the current route.

== FM 1665 ==
Farm to Market Road 1665
- Location: Maverick County
- Length: 3.958 mi (6.370 km)
- Existed: May 23, 1951–present

Farm to Market Road 1665 (FM 1665) is located in Maverick County. It runs from US 277 south of Normandy eastward and southward to another point on US 277.

FM 1665 was designated on May 23, 1951, along the current route.

== FM 1666 ==
Farm to Market Road 1666
- Location: Maverick County
- Length: 0.834 mi (1,342 m)
- Existed: May 23, 1951–present

Farm to Market Road 1666 (FM 1666) is located in Maverick County. It runs from US 277 near Quemado eastward to FM 1908.

FM 1665 was designated on May 23, 1951, along the current route. The eastern terminus was designated FM 1591 until October 19, 1956.

== FM 1667 ==
Farm to Market Road 1667
- Location: Henderson County
- Length: 4.559 mi (7.337 km)
- Existed: October 31, 1958–present

Farm to Market Road 1667 (FM 1667) is located in Henderson County.

=== FM 1667 (1951) ===
Farm to Market Road 1667
- Location: Zavala County
- Existed: May 23, 1951–March 22, 1955

A previous route numbered FM 1667 was designated on May 23, 1951, from FM 1436 at La Pryor east across US 83, then north and west to US 83. FM 1667 was cancelled on March 22, 1955, and became a portion of FM 1436.

== FM 1668 ==
Farm to Market Road 1668
- Location: Zavala County
- Length: 8.539 mi (13.742 km)
- Existed: May 23, 1951–present

Farm to Market Road 1668 (FM 1668) is located in Zavala County.

== FM 1669 ==
Farm to Market Road 1669
- Location: Angelina County
- Length: 10.689 mi (17.202 km)
- Existed: May 23, 1951–present

Farm to Market Road 1669 (FM 1669) is located in Angelina County.

== FM 1670 ==
Farm to Market Road 1670
- Location: Bell County
- Length: 6.825 mi (10.984 km)
- Existed: May 23, 1951–present

Farm to Market Road 1670 (FM 1670) is located in Bell County.

== FM 1671 ==
Farm to Market Road 1671
- Location: Falls and Bell counties
- Length: 7.112 mi (11.446 km)
- Existed: May 23, 1951–present

Farm to Market Road 1671 (FM 1671) is located in Falls and Bell counties.

== RM 1672 ==
Ranch to Market Road 1672
- Location: Coke County
- Length: 1.847 mi (2.972 km)
- Existed: May 23, 1951 (Note: RM 1672 was originally designated as FM 1672 from 1951 to 1959.)–present

Ranch to Market Road 1672 (RM 1672) is located in Coke County.

It was originally designated as Farm to Market Road 1672 (FM 1672).

== FM 1673 ==
Farm to Market Road 1673
- Location: Scurry County
- Length: 9.342 mi (15.034 km)
- Existed: July 28, 1955–present

Farm to Market Road 1673 (FM 1673) is located in Scurry County.

=== FM 1673 (1951) ===
Farm to Market Road 1673
- Location: Coke County
- Existed: May 23, 1951–October 18, 1954

A previous route numbered FM 1673 was designated on May 23, 1951, from US 277, 1 mile (1.6 km) north of Bronte, to the Runnels County line. FM 1673 was cancelled on October 18, 1954, and became a portion of FM 384.

== RM 1674 ==
Ranch to Market Road 1674
- Location: Kimble and Menard counties
- Length: 38.662 mi (62.220 km)
- Existed: May 23, 1951 (Note: RM 1674 was originally designated as FM 1674 from 1951 to 1956.)–present

Ranch to Market Road 1674 (RM 1674) is located in Kimble and Menard counties. It runs from US 377/Loop 481 north of Junction to RM 864 at Fort McKavett.

RM 1674 was designated as FM 1674 on May 23, 1951, from US 290 (now I-10), 3.6 miles (5.8 km) east of Roosevelt, northwest 5.4 miles (8.7 km) to a road intersection. On November 20, 1951, the road was extended north 6.3 miles (10.1 km). On November 21, 1956, the route was changed to RM 1674 and extended north 14.8 miles (23.8 km) to RM 864 at Fort McKavett. On July 1, 1969, the road was extended east 13.7 miles (22.0 km) over a former section of US 290 to US 377/Loop 481 north of Junction. On November 25, 1975, a 2.7-mile (4.3 km) section from RM 864 north to SH 29 (now US 190) was added, but this was cancelled on January 24, 1978.

== RM 1675 ==
Ranch to Market Road 1675
- Location: Reagan County
- Length: 2.851 mi (4.588 km)
- Existed: May 23, 1951 (Note: RM 1675 was originally designated as FM 1675 from 1951 to 1959.)–present

Ranch to Market Road 1675 (RM 1675) is located in Reagan County. It runs from US 67 via Texon and Santa Rita to another point on US 67.

RM 1675 was designed on May 23, 1951, along the current route as Farm to Market Road 1675 (FM 1675). The designation was changed to RM 1675 on November 13, 1959.

== RM 1676 ==
Ranch to Market Road 1676
- Location: Reagan and Crockett counties
- Length: 12.987 mi (20.901 km)
- Existed: May 23, 1951 (Note: RM 1676 was originally designated as FM 1676 from 1951 to 1959.)–present

Ranch to Market Road 1676 (RM 1676) is located in Reagan and Crockett counties. From its northern terminus at US 67 west of Big Lake, it runs approximately 13 miles (21 km) before state maintenance ends.

RM 1676 was designated on May 23, 1951, as Farm to Market Road 1676 (FM 1676). From US 67, it ran southward and westward for approximately 2 miles (3.2 km). On February 24, 1953, a spur connection to a pipeline station was added. The route was extended to the Crockett County line on October 29, 1953, and the designation was changed to RM 1676 on December 15, 1959. RM 1676 was extended into Crockett County and to its current southern terminus on November 29, 1989. The spur connection was removed and transferred to private ownership on October 30, 2009.

== FM 1677 ==
Farm to Market Road 1677
- Location: Runnels County
- Length: 8.935 mi (14.379 km)
- Existed: May 23, 1951–present

Farm to Market Road 1677 (FM 1677) is located in Runnels County.

== FM 1678 ==
Farm to Market Road 1678
- Location: Runnels County
- Length: 9.118 mi (14.674 km)
- Existed: May 23, 1951–present

Farm to Market Road 1678 (FM 1678) is located in Runnels County.

== FM 1679 ==
Farm to Market Road 1679
- Location: Calhoun County
- Length: 4.491 mi (7.228 km)
- Existed: May 23, 1951–present

Farm to Market Road 1679 (FM 1679) is located in Calhoun County.

== FM 1680 ==
Farm to Market Road 1680
- Location: Gonzales and Lavaca counties
- Length: 12.402 mi (19.959 km)
- Existed: May 23, 1951–present

Farm to Market Road 1680 (FM 1680) is located in Gonzales and Lavaca counties.

== FM 1681 ==
Farm to Market Road 1681
- Location: Gonzales and Wilson counties
- Length: 14.305 mi (23.022 km)
- Existed: May 23, 1951–present

Farm to Market Road 1681 (FM 1681) is located in Gonzales and Wilson counties.

== FM 1682 ==
Farm to Market Road 1682
- Location: Gonzales County
- Length: 6.934 mi (11.159 km)
- Existed: May 23, 1951–present

Farm to Market Road 1682 (FM 1682) is located in Gonzales County. It runs from SH 80 in Leesville to SH 97 in Bebe.

FM 1682 was designated on May 23, 1951, from SH 80 in Leesville, eastward 3.0 miles (4.8 km) to a road intersection. On November 20, 1951, it was extended eastward to SH 200 (now SH 97).

== FM 1683 ==
Farm to Market Road 1683
- Location: Jackson County
- Length: 6.457 mi (10.392 km)
- Existed: May 23, 1951–present

Farm to Market Road 1683 (FM 1683) is located in Jackson County.

== FM 1684 ==
Farm to Market Road 1684
- Location: Refugio County
- Length: 3.413 mi (5.493 km)
- Existed: October 29, 1953–present

Farm to Market Road 1684 (FM 1684) is located in Refugio County.

=== FM 1684 (1951) ===
Farm to Market Road 1684
- Location: La Salle County
- Existed: May 23, 1951–November 16, 1953

A previous route numbered FM 1684 was designated on May 23, 1951, from FM 1019 southeast of Bigwells southeast to FM 468 northwest of Cotulla. On July 31, 1952, the road was rerouted over a section of former FM 468 to Woodward (the former section of FM 1684 became part of FM 468). FM 1684 was cancelled on November 16, 1953, and transferred to FM 469.

== FM 1685 ==
Farm to Market Road 1685
- Location: Victoria County
- Length: 6.616 mi (10.647 km)
- Existed: May 23, 1951–present

Farm to Market Road 1685 (FM 1685) is located in Victoria County.

== FM 1686 ==
Farm to Market Road 1686
- Location: Victoria County
- Length: 20.624 mi (33.191 km)
- Existed: May 23, 1951–present

Farm to Market Road 1686 (FM 1686) is located in Victoria County.

== FM 1687 ==
Farm to Market Road 1687
- Location: Brazos County
- Length: 10.731 mi (17.270 km)
- Existed: May 23, 1951–present

Farm to Market Road 1687 (FM 1687), known locally as Sandy Point Road, is located in Brazos County, running from FM 50 in Mudville, eastward to FM 158 and SH 21 in Bryan.

FM 1687 was designated on May 23, 1951, from SH 21 in Bryan to SH OSR. On November 24, 1959, FM 1687 was extended west 1.8 miles (2.9 km) to a road intersection. On September 27, 1960, FM 1687 was extended west to FM 50. On June 27, 1995, the section from FM 2818 to SH 21 was transferred to UR 1687, but this section was changed back to FM 1687 on November 15, 2018.

The entire route is in Brazos County.

Location	mi	km	Destinations	Notes
Mudville			FM 50	
			SH OSR	
Bryan			FM 2818 (Harvey Mitchell Pkwy)	
Bryan			SH 21 (San Jacinto Ln)	
1.000 mi = 1.609 km; 1.000 km = 0.621 mi

== FM 1688 ==
Farm to Market Road 1688
- Location: Brazos County
- Length: 2.919 mi (4.698 km)
- Existed: May 23, 1951–present

Farm to Market Road 1688 (FM 1688), known locally as Leonard Road, is located in Brazos County, running from SH 47 northeastward to FM 2818 in Bryan.

FM 1688 was designated on May 23, 1951, from Loop 158 (now FM 158) southwest 4.8 miles (7.7 km) to a road intersection. On February 26, 1986, FM 1688 was extended to FM 60. On December 14, 1989, the section from FM 158 to FM 2818 was given to the city of Bryan. On October 28, 1992, the section from SH 47 to FM 60 was transferred to SH 47 (which the route had been decided to follow the proposed route of FM 1688) and FM 1179 (this section of FM 1179 was changed to be built as a county road (Jones Road) on October 26, 1995). On June 27, 1995, FM 1688 was transferred to UR 1688, but this was changed back to FM 1688 on November 15, 2018.

== FM 1689 ==
Farm to Market Road 1689
- Location: Brown and Comanche counties
- Length: 20.892 mi (33.622 km)
- Existed: May 23, 1951–present

Farm to Market Road 1689 (FM 1689) is located in Brown and Comanche counties. The road begins in May off of U.S. Highway 183 (US 183), and continues east, entering Comanche county, as both FM 1477 ends at it and FM 589 merges and eventually ends at FM 1689 in Sidney. The highway ends at SH 36 in Comanche.

FM 1689 was designated on May 23, 1951, from US 283 (now US 183) in May eastward 3.6 miles (5.8 km) to a road intersection at the Comanche County line. On December 11, 1953, FM 1689 was extended east to FM 589 at Sidney, replacing a section of FM 589. On November 21, 1956, FM 1689 was extended southeast 0.6 miles (0.97 km) to a road intersection. On October 14, 1960, FM 1689 was extended southeast to SH 36, replacing FM 2634 (the connecting section was designated on September 27).

== FM 1690 ==
Farm to Market Road 1690
- Location: Lampasas and Coryell counties
- Length: 17.596 mi (28.318 km)
- Existed: May 23, 1951–present

Farm to Market Road 1690 (FM 1690) is located in Lampsas and Coryell counties.

== RM 1691 ==
Ranch to Market Road 1691
- Location: Sutton County
- Length: 18.129 mi (29.176 km)
- Existed: May 23, 1951 (Note: RM 1691 was originally designated as FM 1691 from 1951 to 1956.)–present

Ranch to Market Road 1691 (RM 1691) is located in Sutton County.

It was originally designated as Farm to Market Road 1691 (FM 1691).

== FM 1692 ==
Farm to Market Road 1692
- Location: Tom Green and Runnels counties
- Length: 25.163 mi (40.496 km)
- Existed: May 23, 1951–present

Farm to Market Road 1692 (FM 1692) is located in Tom Green and Runnels counties.

== FM 1693 ==
Farm to Market Road 1693
- Location: Colorado County
- Length: 13.718 mi (22.077 km)
- Existed: May 23, 1951–present

Farm to Market Road 1693 (FM 1693) is located in Colorado County.

== FM 1694 ==
Farm to Market Road 1694
- Location: Nueces County
- Length: 12.058 mi (19.405 km)
- Existed: April 24, 1953–present

Farm to Market Road 1694 (FM 1694) is located in Nueces County.

=== FM 1694 (1951) ===
Farm to Market Road 1694
- Location: Colorado County
- Existed: May 23, 1951–February 24, 1953

A previous route numbered FM 1694 was designated on May 23, 1951, from SH 200 (now US 90 Alt.) west and south to near Calhoun. FM 1694 was cancelled on February 24, 1953, and eliminated from the highway system in exchange for extending FM 1597 (now FM 1093); FM 1694 was to be transferred to FM 1597, but this never happened.

== FM 1695 ==
Farm to Market Road 1695
- Location: McLennan County
- Length: 5.944 mi (9.566 km)
- Existed: October 31, 1958–present

Farm to Market Road 1695 (FM 1695) is located in McLennan County. It runs from US 84 west of Waco to I-35. The highway is locally known as Hewitt Drive for its entire length.

FM 1695 begins at I-35/FM 3148 in Hewitt. The highway travels in a northwest direction before turning in a slight northeast direction at an interchange with FM 2113 (Spring Valley Road). FM 1695 travels near the town square and turns back to the northwest at FM 2063 (Sun Valley Boulevard). The highway enters Woodway before ending at US 84.

FM 1695 was designated on October 31, 1958, from US 84, 1.5 miles (2.4 km) west of Waco, south via Hewitt to FM 2113. On June 30, 1995, the route was redesignated Urban Road 1695 (UR 1695). On September 25, 2008, by district request, the road was extended to I-35. The designation reverted to FM 1695 with the elimination of the Urban Road system on November 15, 2018.

Junction list

The entire route is in McLennan County.

Location	mi	km	Destinations	Notes
Hewitt	0.0	0.0	I-35 / FM 3148 east – Waco, Fort Worth, Dallas, Austin	I-35 exit 325
Hewitt	0.7	1.1	FM 2113 (Spring Valley Road)	Interchange
Hewitt	3.4	5.5	FM 2063 east (Sun Valley Boulevard) to I-35 / Chama Drive	
Waco	5.3	8.5	FM 3223 east (Imperial Drive) / Chapel Road	
Woodway	5.9	9.5	US 84 (Woodway Drive)	
1.000 mi = 1.609 km; 1.000 km = 0.621 mi

=== FM 1695 (1951) ===
Farm to Market Road 1695
- Location: Freestone and Navarro counties
- Existed: May 23, 1951–November 22, 1954

A previous route numbered FM 1695 was designated on May 23, 1951, from FM 488 west 5.0 miles (8.0 km) to Saint Elmo. On August 20, 1952, the road was extended 1.6 miles (2.6 km) west to Winkler. FM 1695 was cancelled on November 22, 1954, and became a portion of FM 246 (now FM 416).

== FM 1696 ==
Farm to Market Road 1696
- Location: Grimes and Walker counties
- Length: 30.908 mi (49.742 km)
- Existed: May 23, 1951–present

Farm to Market Road 1696 (FM 1696) is located in Grimes and Walker counties.

== FM 1697 ==
Farm to Market Road 1697
- Location: Washington and Lee counties
- Length: 14.993 mi (24.129 km)
- Existed: May 23, 1951–present

Farm to Market Road 1697 (FM 1697) is located in Washington and Lee counties.

== FM 1698 ==
Farm to Market Road 1698
- Location: Terry County
- Length: 5.815 mi (9.358 km)
- Existed: July 25, 1951–present

Farm to Market Road 1698 (FM 1698) is located in Terry County.

=== FM 1698 (May 1951) ===
Farm to Market Road 1698
- Location: Hopkins County
- Existed: May 23, 1951–August 8, 1951

A previous route numbered FM 1698 was designated on May 23, 1951, from SH 11 at Como south 5.5 miles (8.9 km) to a county road. FM 1698 was cancelled two months later and became a portion of FM 270 (now FM 69).

== FM 1699 ==
Farm to Market Road 1699
- Location: Red River County
- Length: 12.993 mi (20.910 km)
- Existed: May 23, 1951–present

Farm to Market Road 1699 is a 12.993-mile (20.910 km) state road in Red River County that connects FM 1158 in White Rock with FM 114 in English.
