= Farm to Market Road 973 =

Road in Texas, United States

Farm to Market Road 973

Route information
- Maintained by TxDOT
- Length: 34.499 mi (Note: The certified length given is shorter than the actual mileage, as the TxDOT description of FM 973 considers it to be discontinuous at rather than concurrent with FM 812, SH 71, and Loop 212.) (55.521 km)
- Existed: 1948–present

Major junctions
- South end: US 183
- SH 71 near Austin-Bergstrom International Airport; SH 130 Toll; US 290 in Manor
- North end: US 79 in Taylor

Location
- Country: United States
- State: Texas
- Counties: Travis, Williamson

Highway system
- Highways in Texas; Interstate; US; State; Former; Toll; Loops; Spurs; FM/RM; Park; Rec
← FM 972	→ FM 974

Farm to Market Road 973 (FM 973) is a farm-to-market road in Travis and Williamson counties in the U.S. state of Texas.

== Route description ==
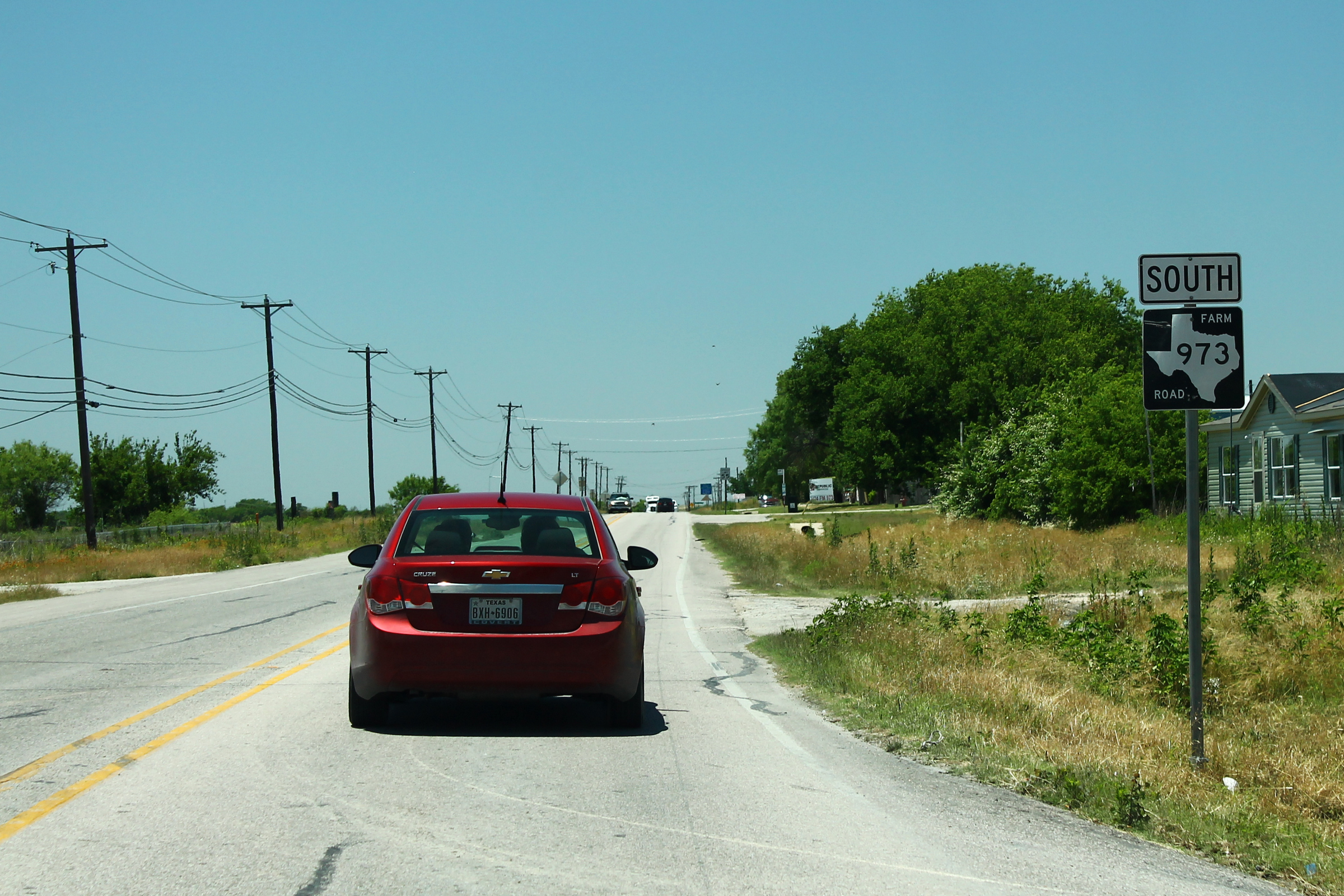
Roadsign off TX SH 71

FM 973 begins at US 183 southeast of Austin, near Mustang Ridge. The route travels generally to the northeast and enters Austin, where it intersects SH 71 near Austin–Bergstrom International Airport. It continues to skirt the eastern city limits of Austin, crossing the SH 130 toll road before entering Manor, where it intersects US 290. FM 973 continues north into Williamson County before reaching its northern terminus at US 79 in Taylor.

The segment of FM 973 between US 183 and SH 71 is designated a scenic roadway by the City of Austin.

== History ==
FM 973 was first designated in Williamson County on November 23, 1948; its original routing was from SH 95 north of Coupland to the Travis County line. It was extended southward into Travis County on May 23, 1951, to an intersection with the former SH 20 (present-day US 290) in Manor, replacing FM 1326. On January 21, 1956, the route was extended northward to SH 95 in Taylor, and the eastern leg from Rice's Crossing to SH 95 was redesignated as FM 1660, but was not effective until the 1957 travel map was released. On October 31, 1957, a southern extension from Manor to SH 71 was added. The section from Loop 212 to FM 969 was formerly proposed as FM 2332. Two further extensions, to FM 812 on September 20, 1961, and US 183 on June 12, 1968, brought the route's southern terminus to its current location. On April 30, 1987, the northern terminus in Taylor was shifted to a point along US 79; this change took effect in 1992, when the new alignment was opened to traffic. On June 29, 2010, FM 973 was rerouted, with the old route given to the county. On February 24, 2011, FM 973 was rerouted on a new route from US 290 to current FM 973; the old route became Business FM 973.

In 2017, TxDOT began studying the possibility of rerouting and expanding FM 973 to bypass downtown Manor and eliminate its concurrency with US 290. As of June 2022, the preferred alignment has been identified, but funding has not yet been secured.

== Major intersections ==
County	Location	mi	km	Destinations	Notes
Travis		0.0	0.0	US 183 – Lockhart, Austin	Southern terminus
Travis		2.5	4.0	FM 812 east – Elroy	South end of FM 812 concurrency
Travis	Austin	3.1	5.0	FM 812 west	North end of FM 812 concurrency
Travis	Austin	7.3	11.7	SH 71 (Bastrop Highway) – Bastrop, Austin–Bergstrom International Airport	Interchange
Travis		11.6	18.7	FM 969 (Webberville Road) – Webberville	
Travis		15.0	24.1	SH 45 Toll / SH 130 Toll – Pflugerville, Georgetown	SH 130 exit 441
Travis	Manor	19.0	30.6	Loop 212 west (Old Highway 20)	South end of Loop 212 concurrency
Travis	Manor	20.4	32.8	US 290 – Austin, Elgin	North end of Loop 212 concurrency
Williamson	Rice's Crossing	31.1	50.1	FM 1660 – Hutto, Coupland	
Williamson	Taylor	36.6	58.9	US 79 – Round Rock	Northern terminus
1.000 mi = 1.609 km; 1.000 km = 0.621 mi
