= Katherine Taylor (artist) =

American artist and sculptor (born 1974)

Katherine 'KT' Taylor
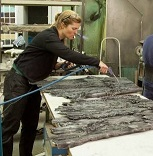
- Taylor working at Alfa Arte
- Born: 1974 (age 51–52); Midland, Texas, U.S.
- Occupations: Artist, sculptor
- Website: www.ktcreature.com

Katherine 'KT' Taylor (born 1974, Midland, Texas) is an American artist living and working between Houston, Texas; Keene, New York; and Eibar, Spain. Taylor primarily focuses on cast metal sculptures in bronze and stainless steel.

== Early life and education ==
Taylor was born in Midland, a city in western Texas, in October 1974. Taylor attended the St. Paul’s School in Concord, New Hampshire, from which she graduated in 1993. She then attended Dartmouth College, graduating with a bachelor's degree in studio art in 1997, and received her Master of Fine Arts from the University of Melbourne in 2005.

== Career ==
Taylor works with Alfa Arte, a fine art foundry located in Northern Spain. She started working with Alfa almost twenty years ago when she met her husband who is also from the Basque Country.

Taylor's 2019 exhibition at Skoto Gallery in New York was inspired by her trip to the Arctic through the Arctic Circle Residency program, and the fauna she saw there.

In 2021, Taylor was the Sawtooth National Recreation Area's artist-in-residence. She has also been commissioned for pieces at the Museum of the Southwest, University of Texas Permian Basin and Easton Park, Austin, TX.

Her work is represented by the Skoto Gallery in New York City.

== Exhibitions ==
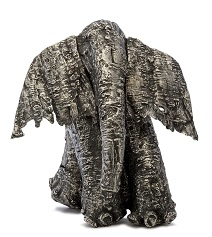
Elefantito stainless steel shown at Skoto Gallery 2018

Taylor began exhibiting in the late 1990s and has since taken part in over 40 individual and group exhibitions in Europe, North America and Australia.

She has exhibited at the Skoto Gallery in New York multiple times. She has had sole exhibitions there in 2014, 2016, 2019, and 2023. She has been included in group exhibitions there in 2012 and 2015.

Solo exhibitions

- 2004:
  - Maurice Stenberg Galleries, Chicago
  - Red Gallery, Melbourne, Australia
- 2010: New Harmony Gallery of Contemporary Art
- 2013: National Arts Club (New York)

Group exhibitions

- 2005: Cobalt Gallery, Melbourne, Australia
- 2007: Alfa Arte Prize, Eibar (Spain)
- 2012: Hood Museum (New Hampshire)
- 2015: Art Center at Hargate, St. Paul's School (New Hampshire)

== Awards ==
Katherine has received multiple grants and scholarship from different foundations and schools.

Year	Award
2019	Fuera de Serie award to the best Furniture design, Barcelona, Spain
2018	The Arctic Circle Summer Expedition
2006	Karravaz Foundation, Spain
2003	Melbourne University, Australia
2002	Reynolds Scholarship, Dartmouth College
2001	Ceramic Sculpture Award, University of Texas
