= Newton Collins =

American former slave and landowner

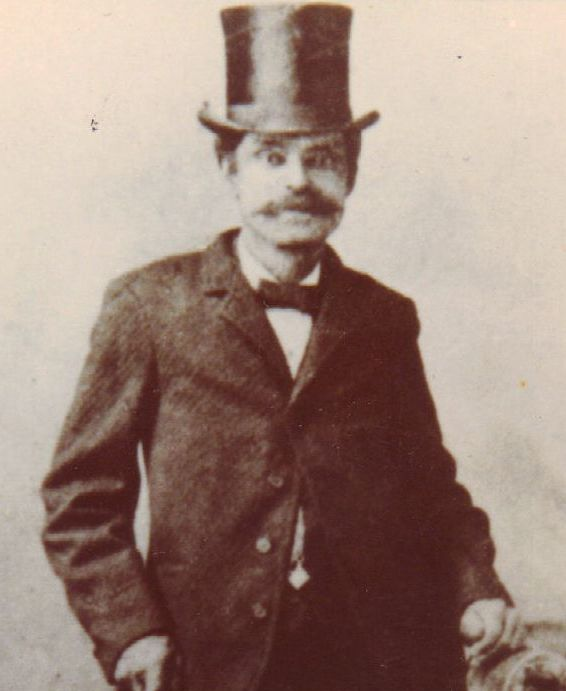
- Born: Newton Isaac Collins; February 11, 1826; State of Alabama, U.S.
- Died: September 7, 1903 (aged 77); Austin, Texas, U.S.
- Known for: Re-enslavement in Texas; post-emancipation prosperity

Newton Isaac Collins Sr. (February 11, 1826 – September 7, 1903) was an African-American freedman from Alabama who moved to Travis County, Texas, in the 1840s, where he was re-enslaved. After the Emancipation Proclamation, Collins again received his freedom and became a businessman, land owner, and community leader in southeastern Travis County.

== Biography ==
His mother was an enslaved African-American; his father, Silas Collins, was their enslaver, but manumitted the young Collins at an early age and saw to it that he was educated and apprenticed in carpentry. After his father died in the 1840s, Collins moved to the area that is now Manor, Texas, where he was kidnapped and re-enslaved by a family named Parsons. In 1854, he married Sarah Elizabeth Harrington, a similarly-literate enslaved woman on the Parson estate, with whom he eventually had eight children.

With the promulgation of the Emancipation Proclamation in Texas on June 19, 1865, Collins again received his freedom. He then developed a carpentry business constructing houses and churches around Travis County, Texas. Over the succeeding decades his business success enabled him to buy land in eastern Travis County, including some 506 acres (205 ha) of farmland in Pilot Knob, Texas, near what is now McKinney Falls State Park.

As Collins and his adult children's families settled in the area, he built and furnished a one-room school and a Methodist church to serve the community, and he hired a teacher and preacher to operate them. Collins died in Austin on September 7, 1903, and was buried in the Collins Cemetery on his family land in Pilot Knob.

Newton Collins Elementary School in Easton Park, Austin, is named after Collins. It is thought to be the first modern school in Central Texas named for a formerly enslaved person.
