= Norman's Crossing, Texas =

Unincorporated community in Texas, US

- Unincorporated community
- Location in Texas
- Country: United States
- State: Texas
- County: Williamson
- Established: 1846
- Founder: Daniel Kimbro
- Named for: Martin Bynum Norman, originally for Willis Avery

Population (2009)
  - Total: 40
- Time zone: UTC-6 (Central (CST))
  - Summer (DST): UTC-5 (CDT)
- ZIP code: 76574
- Area code: 512

Norman's Crossing (sometimes shortened to just "Norman") is an unincorporated farming community in Williamson County, Texas, United States, founded by Daniel Kimbro (1808-1852) in 1846. The community is located on Brushy Creek between Hutto and Rice's Crossing, near the intersection of FM 1660 and FM 3349, approximately 25 miles northeast of Austin.

== History ==
Originally named Avery, it was later known as Norman's Crossing, after M. B. Norman (1856-1921), an Alabama native, who owned a farm and co-operated a cotton gin there. In the early 1900s, the town had a church, school, store, a garage shop, and a machine shop. Descendants of Kimbro and Norman still live in the area today.

== See also ==
List of unincorporated communities in Texas
Rice's Crossing
Brushy Creek
