= Farm to Market Road 812 =

Road in Texas, United States

Farm to Market Road 812

Route information
- Maintained by TxDOT
- Length: 21.272 mi (34.234 km)
- Existed: 1948–present

Major junctions
- South end: FM 20 at Red Rock
- SH 21
- North end: US 183 at Pilot Knob

Location
- Country: United States
- State: Texas

Highway system
- Highways in Texas; Interstate; US; State; Former; Toll; Loops; Spurs; FM/RM; Park; Rec
← FM 811	→ FM 813

Farm to Market Road 812 (FM 812) is a 21.3-mile (34.3 km) state-maintained roadway located in Travis and Bastrop counties in the US State of Texas.

== History ==
Part of FM 812 was once known as the Austin-Port Lavaca Stagecoach Road.

FM 812 was first designated on August 26, 1948, for the road segment between SH 29 (along the current US 183 alignment) and Elroy. It was gradually extended southeast on SH 21 on October 28, 1953, to 7.0 miles (11.3 km) southeast on May 2, 1962, and to its current terminus near Red Rock on May 6, 1964.

== Route description ==
FM 812 begins at an intersection with FM 20 just west of the community of Red Rock in western Bastrop County. From there, it proceeds northwest, passing through the community of Elroy, and ends at US 183, just south of Austin-Bergstrom International Airport in the community of Pilot Knob.

For a 0.5-mile (0.80 km) segment east of Pilot Knob, FM 812 runs concurrently with FM 973.

== Major intersections ==
County	Location	mi	km	Destinations	Notes
Bastrop		0.0	0.0	FM 20	Southern terminus
Bastrop		4.8	7.7	FM 672	
Bastrop		11.1	17.9	SH 21	Diamond interchange
Bastrop		13.5	21.7	FM 2430 (Mesa Drive)	
Travis		18.5	29.8	SH 130 Toll	Diamond interchange
Travis		19.2	30.9	FM 973 south	East end of FM 973 overlap
Travis		19.7	31.7	FM 973 north	West end of FM 973 overlap
Travis		21.3	34.3	US 183	Northern terminus
1.000 mi = 1.609 km; 1.000 km = 0.621 mi: Concurrency terminus
