= Pilot Knob, Texas =

Pilot Knob
- Unincorporated community
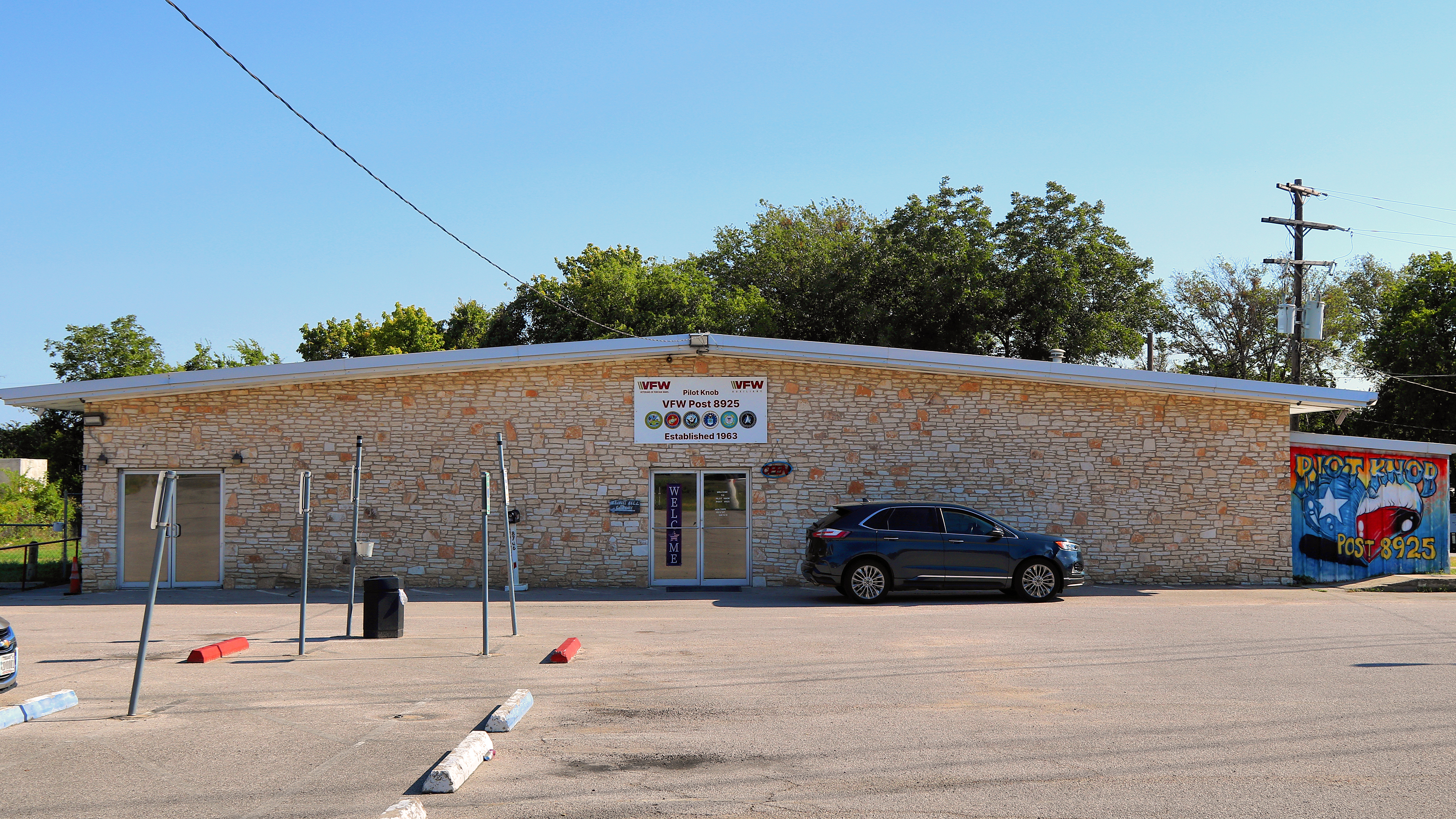
- VFW Post 8925 has been a fixture in Pilot Knob since 1963.

- Location within the state of Texas Pilot Knob (the United States)
- Coordinates: 30°09′51″N 97°41′35″W
- Country: United States
- State: Texas
- County: Travis
- Time zone: UTC-6 (Central (CST))
  - Summer (DST): UTC-5 (CDT)

Pilot Knob is an unincorporated community in southern Travis County, Texas, United States, named after an extinct volcano found in the area. The area is semi-rural with residences on large lots or acreage and convenience stores and other small businesses. It is located within the Greater Austin metropolitan area.

== History ==
Pilot Knob was named for Pilot Knob, the remnant hill of an extinct volcano. It was first settled sometime after the American Civil War. A church and a few scattered houses were visible in the 1940s. Residents tried to incorporate Pilot Knob in 1963, but it did not have enough signatures.

In 2012, the Pilot Knob planned unit development was approved.

== Geography ==
Pilot Knob is located at the intersection of US 183 and Farm to Market Road 812, 8 mi (13 km) southeast of Austin in southern Travis County.

== Education ==
In 1907, Pilot Knob had a school with two teachers and 99 students. It joined the Del Valle Independent School District in 1956 or 1957. Schools serving the community are Newton Collins Elementary School, Hillcrest Elementary School, John P. Ojeda Junior High School, and Del Valle High School.

== Notable person ==
Newton Collins, a freedman from Alabama, had a 506 acres (205 ha) farm in Pilot Knob, and an elementary school was named after him in 2018.
