= Colton, Texas =

- Unincorporated community
- Location within Texas Location within the United States
- Coordinates: 30°8′59″N 97°41′50″W
- Country: United States
- State: Texas
- County: Travis
- Elevation: 535 ft (163 m)
- Time zone: UTC-6 (Central (CST))
  - Summer (DST): UTC-5 (CDT)
- Area codes: 512 & 737
- GNIS feature ID: 1380829

Colton is an unincorporated community in Travis County, in the U.S. state of Texas. According to the Handbook of Texas, the community had a population of 50 in 2000. It is located within the Greater Austin metropolitan area.

== Geography ==
Colton is located on U.S. Route 183 and FM 1625, 7 mi (11 km) southeast of Austin in Travis County.

== Education ==
Today the community is served by the Del Valle Independent School District. Schools that serve the community are Hillcrest Elementary School, John P. Ojeda Junior High School, and Del Valle High School.
