= Jonah, Texas =

Unincorporated community in Texas, US

Coordinates: 30°38′17″N 97°32′27″W

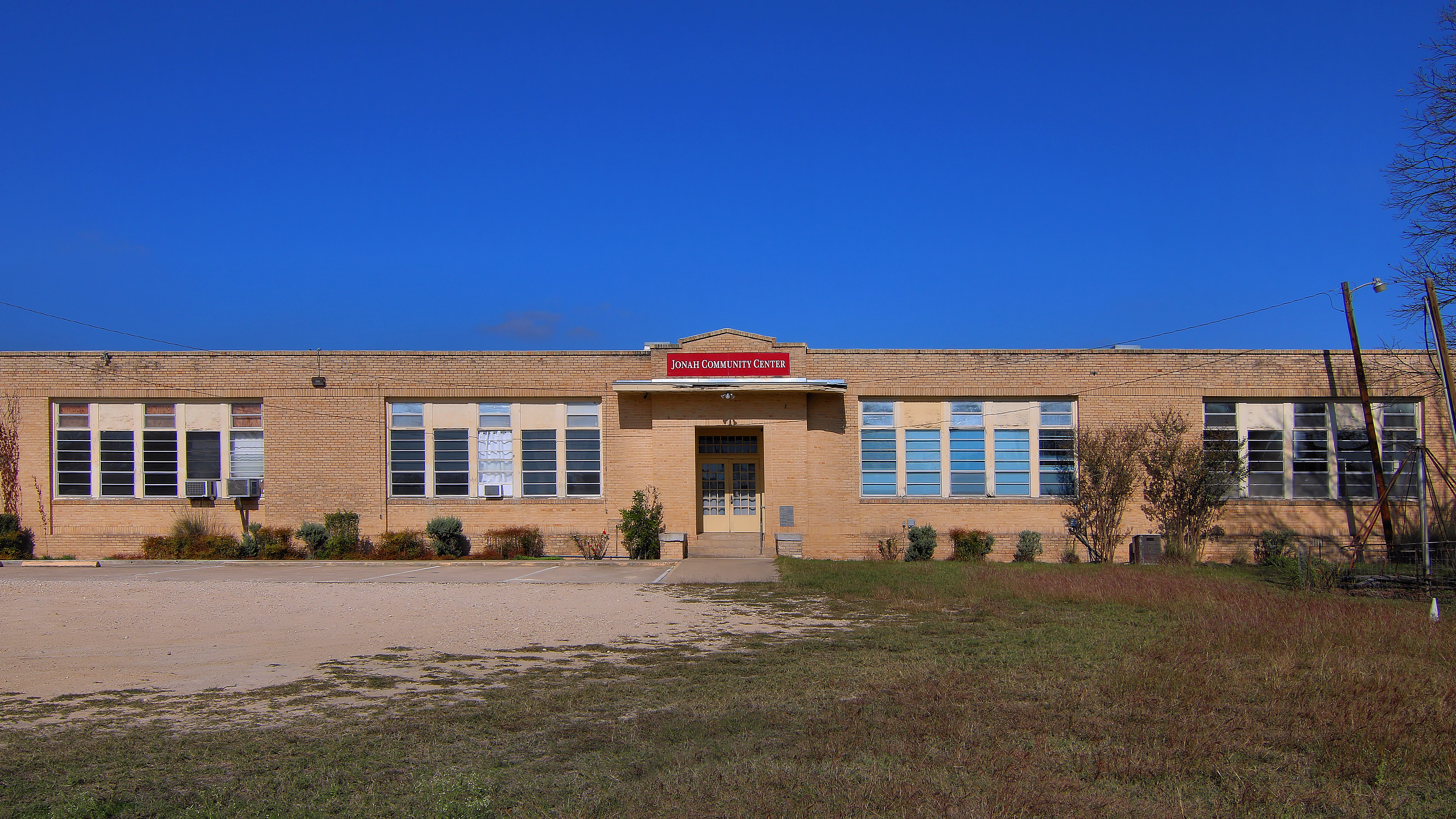
The Jonah Community Center

Jonah is an unincorporated community in Williamson County, Texas, United States. As of the 1990 census, the community had a population of 60.

Formed around mills along the San Gabriel river, the community went by several names until 1884, when the name "Jonah" was approved by post office officials. The Jonah school, built in 1922, still exists as a community center. In 1972, the Jonah Water Special Utility District was formed and continues to serve the surrounding area.
