= Easton Park =

Easton Park Pilot Knob
- Neighborhood
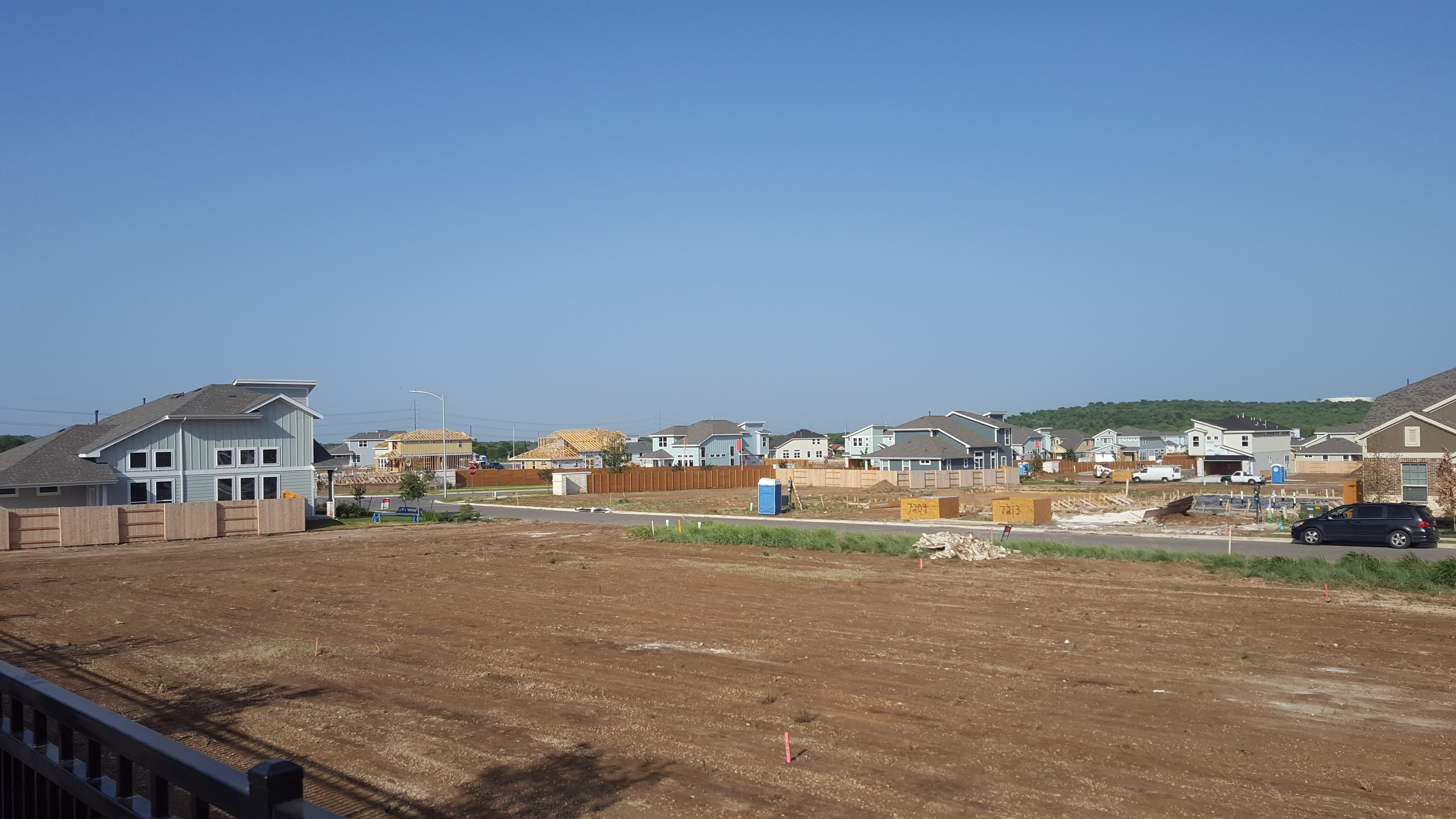
- New home construction at Easton Park in Austin, Texas, United States. Taken 11 July 2016 from the northeast corner of William Cannon Drive and McKinney Falls Parkway.
- Motto: Your Parks. You're Home.
- Coordinates: 30°8′41″N 97°42′55″W
- Country: United States
- State: Texas
- City: Austin

Area
  - Total: 3.459375 sq mi (8.95974 km^{2})
- Time zone: UTC-6 (CST)
  - Summer (DST): UTC-5 (CDT)
- ZIP Codes: 78744
- Area codes: 512, 737
- Website: www.eastonparkatx.com

Easton Park, also referred to as the Pilot Knob planned unit development, is a 2,214-acre (896 ha) Planned unit development (PUD) in the southeast portion of the city of Austin, Texas, United States. The master-planned community is currently being developed within the Pilot Knob MUD which had been under review since 2012.

== Overview ==
The community is being developed by Canadian-based Brookfield Residential as a collections of neighborhoods connected with 13.1 miles of trails and 360 acres of open space parks, recreational, and limited commercial use. When complete, the project is anticipated to have 14,300 residential units and 5.35 million square feet of commercial real estate.

== Builders ==
As of mid-2016, there were seven residential builders participating in the development of the community: Perry Homes, Brohn Homes, Highland Homes, Milestone Community Builders, Pacesetter Homes, Avi Homes, Buffington Homes, and Dream Finders Homes.

== Affordability ==
1,000 of the homes are to be earmarked for low-income residents, available through an Austin Housing Finance Corporation land trust. Eligible homes would be available to households earning less than 80% of the city's mean family income (MFI). 350 rental units will also be set aside for those earning less than 60% of the Austin MFI.
