= Rice's Crossing, Texas =

Unincorporated community in Texas, U.S.

Coordinates: 30.4796°N 97.4583°W

Rice's Crossing is an unincorporated community located six miles southwest of Taylor in Williamson County, Texas, United States. Settled in 1845 and originally called Blue Hill, the community was renamed Rice's Crossing in 1872 in honor of James O. Rice, a Texas Ranger and early settler.
