= List of dams and reservoirs in Texas =

Following is a list of dams and reservoirs in Texas.

All major dams are linked below. The National Inventory of Dams defines any "major dam" as being 50 feet (15 m) tall with a storage capacity of at least 5,000 acre-feet (6,200,000 m^{3}), or of any height with a storage capacity of 25,000 acre-feet (31,000,000 m^{3}).

== Dams and reservoirs in Texas ==
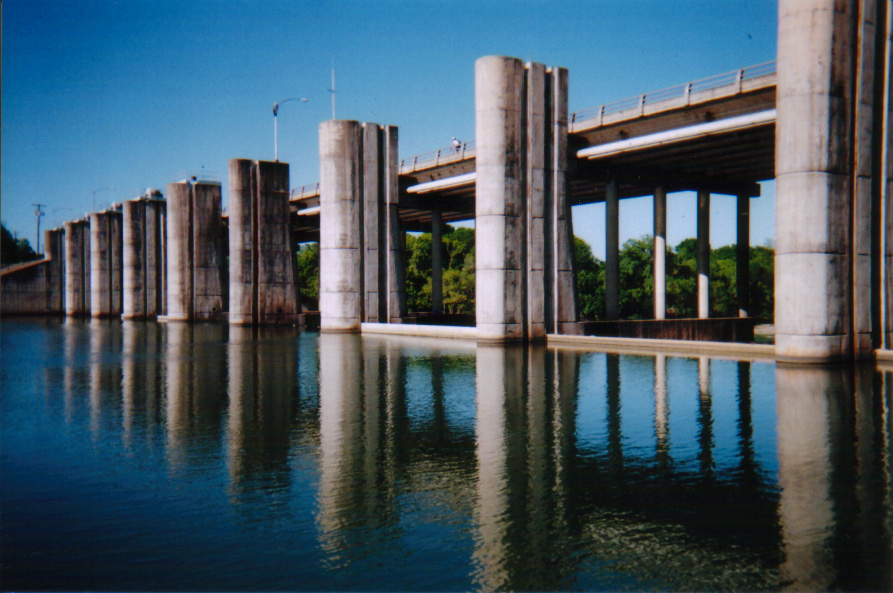
Longhorn Dam

Canyon Dam

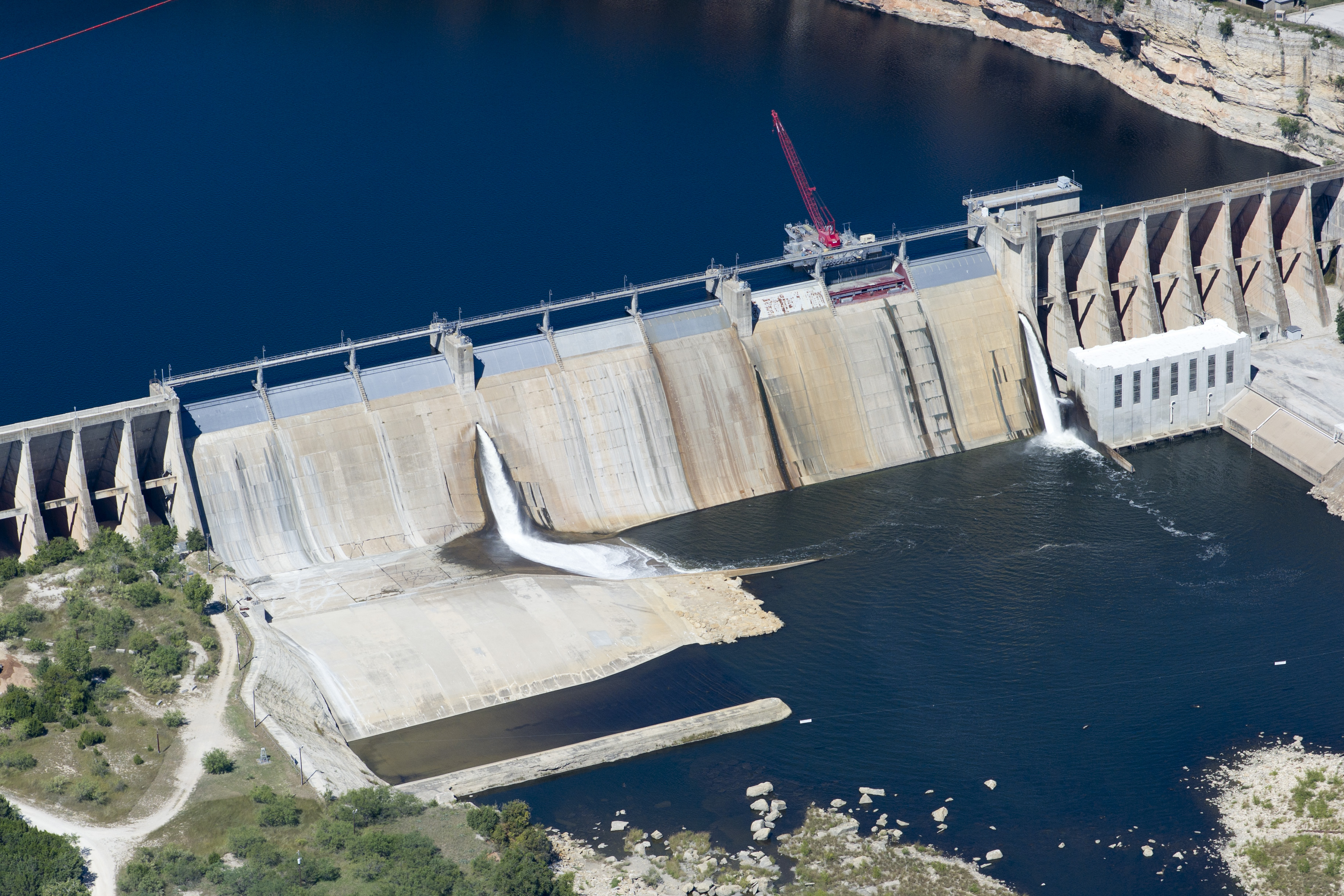
Morris Sheppard Dam, Possum Kingdom Lake

This list is incomplete. You can help Wikipedia by expanding it.

- Addicks Dam, Addicks Reservoir, United States Army Corps of Engineers
- Amistad Dam, Amistad Reservoir, International Boundary and Water Commission
- Aquilla Dam, Aquilla Lake, USACE
- Barker Dam, Barker Reservoir, USACE
- Benbrook Dam, Benbrook Lake, USACE
- Buchanan Dam, Lake Buchanan, Lower Colorado River Authority
- Canyon Dam, Canyon Lake, USACE
- Choke Canyon Dam, Choke Canyon Reservoir, United States Bureau of Reclamation
- De Cordova Bend Dam, Lake Granbury, Brazos River Authority
- Denison Dam, Lake Texoma, USACE
- Falcon Dam, Falcon International Reservoir, International Boundary and Water Commission
- Grapevine Lake Dam, Grapevine Lake, USACE
- Ferrells Bridge Dam, Lake O' the Pines, USACE
- Inks Dam, Inks Lake, Lower Colorado River Authority
- Jim Chapman Dam, Jim Chapman Lake, USACE
- John T. Montford Dam, Lake Alan Henry, City of Lubbock
- Lake Conroe Dam, Lake Conroe, City of Houston, San Jacinto River Authority
- Lake Fork Dam, Lake Fork Reservoir, Sabine River Authority of Texas
- Lake J.B. Thomas Dam, Lake J.B. Thomas, Colorado River Municipal Water District
- Lavon Dam, Lake Lavon, USACE
- Livingston Dam, Lake Livingston, Trinity River Authority
- Lewisville Lake Dam, Lewisville Lake, USACE
- Longhorn Dam, Lady Bird Lake, City of Austin, Texas
- Lost Creek Dam, Lake Jacksboro, City of Jacksboro, Texas
- Mansfield Dam, Lake Travis, Lower Colorado River Authority
- Medina Dam, Medina Lake, Bexar-Medina-Atascosa Water District
- Morris Sheppard Dam, Possum Kingdom Lake, Brazos River Authority
- Palmetto Bend Dam, Lake Texana, Lavaca-Navidad River Authority
- Lake Pflugerville, offstream storage, City of Pflugerville
- Olmos Dam
- Plunk Lake, Texas
- Joe Pool Dam, Joe Pool Lake, USACE
- Sam Rayburn Dam, Sam Rayburn Reservoir, USACE
- Red Bluff Dam, Red Bluff Reservoir, Red Bluff Water Control District
- Robert Lee Dam, E.V. Spence Reservoir, Colorado River Municipal Water District
- Rio Vista Dam, unnamed reservoir, City of San Marcos, Texas
- Sterling C. Robertson Dam, Lake Limestone, Brazos River Authority
- S.W. Freese Dam, O.H. Ivie Reservoir, Colorado River Municipal Water District
- Saffold Dam, unnamed reservoir, City of Seguin
- Sanford Dam, Lake Meredith, USBR
- Somerville Dam, Somerville Lake, USACE
- Stamford Dam, Lake Stamford, City of Stamford
- Max Starcke Dam, Lake Marble Falls, Lower Colorado River Authority
- Tawakoni Dam, Lake Tawakoni, Sabine River Authority of Texas
- Toledo Bend Dam, Toledo Bend Reservoir, Sabine River Authority of Texas (shared with Louisiana)
- Tom Miller Dam, Lake Austin, Lower Colorado River Authority
- Town Bluff Dam, Steinhagen Reservoir, USACE
- Twin Buttes Dam, Twin Buttes Reservoir, USBR
- Lake Waco Dam, Lake Waco, USACE
- Whitney Dam, Lake Whitney, USACE
- White Rock Dam, White Rock Lake, City of Dallas
- Wirtz Dam, Lake Lyndon B. Johnson, Lower Colorado River Authority
- Wright Patman Dam, Wright Patman Lake, USACE

== See also ==
- List of lakes in Texas
