= Texas Highland Lakes =

Fresh water reservoirs in Texas

Coordinates: 30.5678°N 98.3827°W

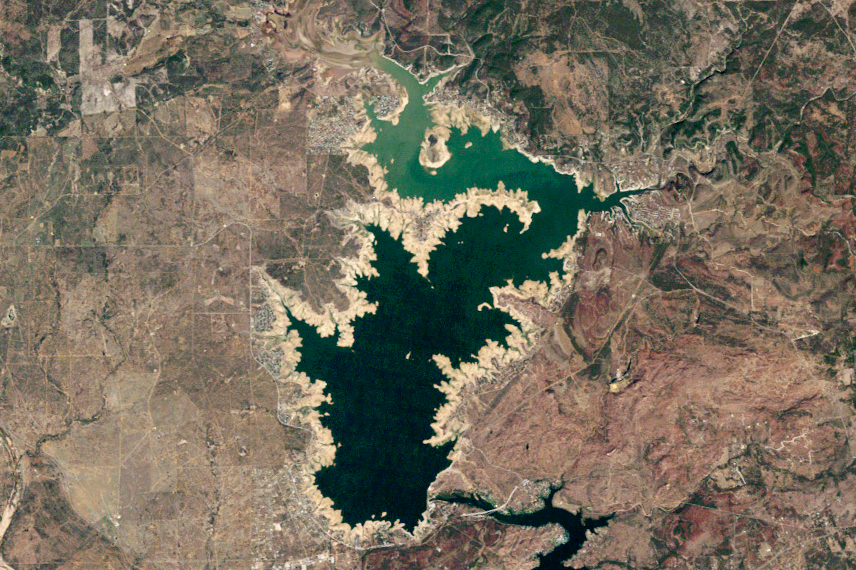
Lake Buchanan, the largest of the Texas Highland Lakes.

The Texas Highland Lakes are a chain of fresh water reservoirs in Central Texas formed by dams on the lower Colorado River. The Texas Colorado River winds southeast from West Texas to Matagorda Bay and the Gulf of Mexico.

The lower Colorado River basin has a history of major flooding. The Lower Colorado River Authority (LCRA) built the dams to manage floods and generate hydroelectric power in the 1930s and 1940s.

Lady Bird Lake (formerly Town Lake) and the respective Longhorn Dam are sometimes considered the seventh "honorary" lake and dam of the Highland Lakes despite being commissioned and managed by the City of Austin instead of the LCRA. Unlike the other reservoirs in the chain which were constructed primarily to prevent flooding and generate hydroelectric power, Lady Bird Lake was constructed in order to provide a cooling pond for the city's new power plant.

Lake	Dam	Year completed	Managing Authority	Lake area (acres)	Lake length (mi)	Max lake width (ft)	Lake volume (acre-ft)	Dam length (ft)	Dam height (ft)
Lake Buchanan	Buchanan Dam	1938	Lower Colorado River Authority	22,452	30.65	26,000 (4.92 mi)	880,356	10,988	145.5
Inks Lake	Inks Dam	1938	Lower Colorado River Authority	777	4.2	3,000	13,668	1,547.5	96.5
Lake LBJ	Wirtz Dam	1951	Lower Colorado River Authority	6,432	21.15	10,800	131,618	5,491.4	118.3
Lake Marble Falls	Max Starcke Dam	1951	Lower Colorado River Authority	613	5.75	1,080	7,597	859.5	98.8
Lake Travis	Mansfield Dam	1942	Lower Colorado River Authority	19,044			1,115,076	7,089	278
Lake Austin	Tom Miller Dam	1940	Lower Colorado River Authority	1,830	20.25	1,300	24,644	1,590	100.5
Lady Bird Lake	Longhorn Dam	1960	City of Austin	416	6	2,500	7,151	760	36

The two largest lakes—Buchanan and Travis—are the reservoirs that store water supply for the region. The smaller lakes—Inks, LBJ, Marble Falls and Austin—are pass-through lakes that are operated within a certain range.

In all, the six official dams of the Highland Lakes have a hydroelectric power production capacity of 295MW, with Mansfield Dam alone able to provide 108MW. While Longhorn Dam has no hydroelectric production capacity, Lady Bird Lake served as a cooling pond for the 100MW Seaholm Power Plant and the 550MW Holly Street Power Plant until they were closed in 1996 and 2007, respectively.
