= Tailrace fishing =

Angling below water restrictions

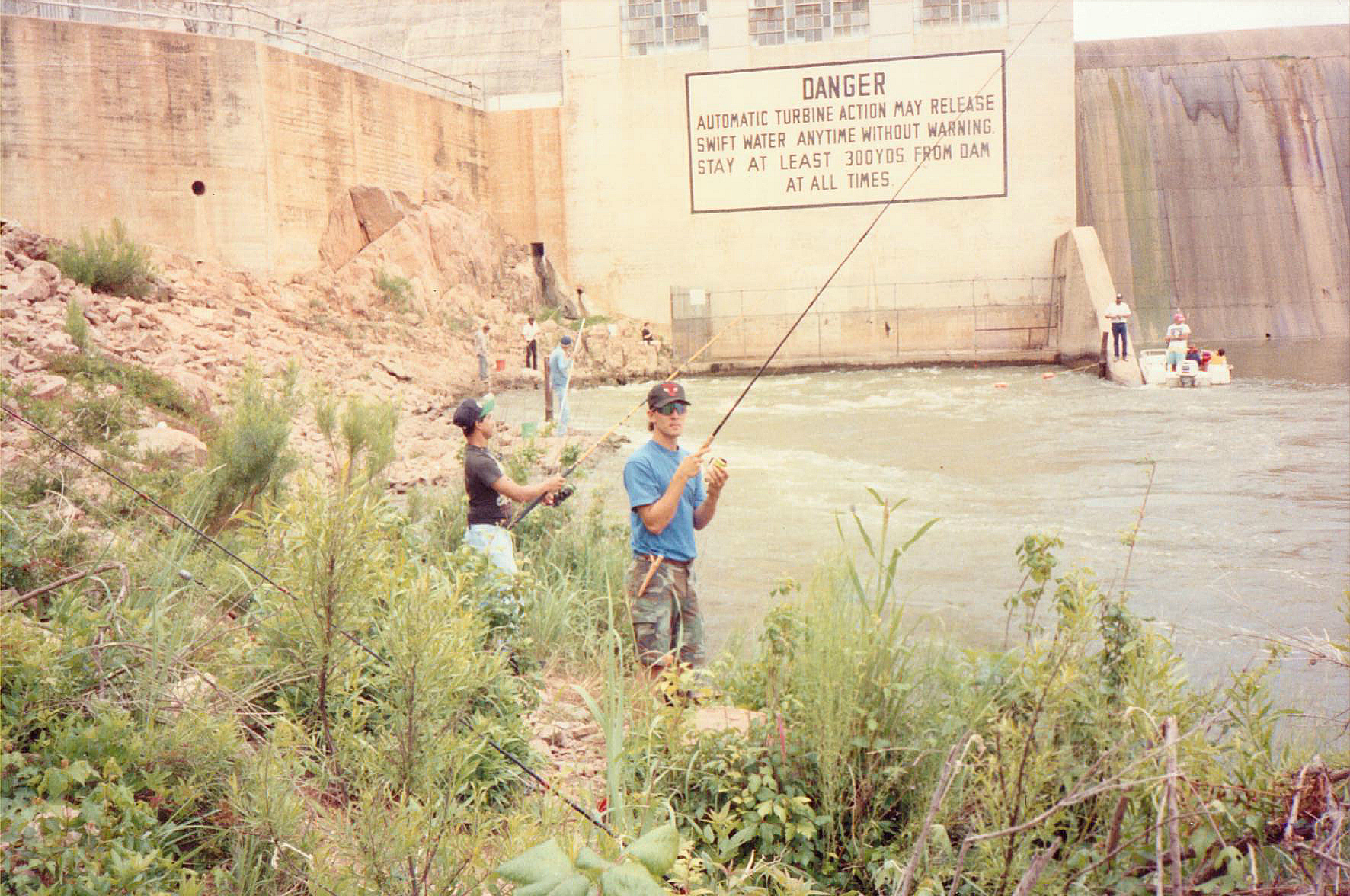
Tailrace fishing at the Inks Dam, Texas

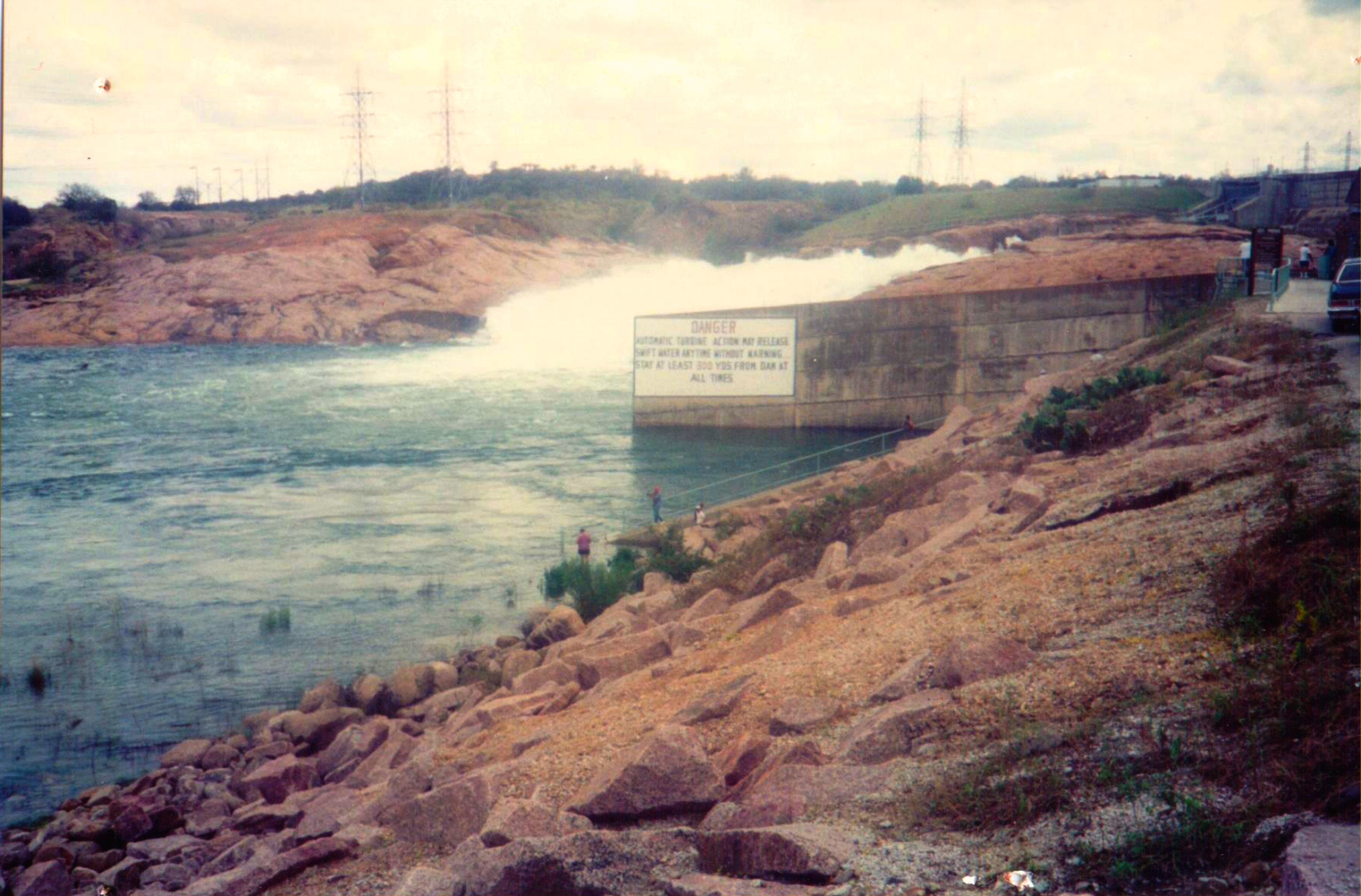
Tailrace fishing at the Wirtz Dam, Texas

Tailrace fishing is angling immediately below natural or man-made dams or restrictions to the flow of water on rivers, canals, streams or any other flowing current. Fishing in a tailrace requires a distinct set of skills in that lures or bait must be moved through the flowing water to the feeding spots in the currents. Hydro tailrace fishing occurs in the discharge of hydroelectric power stations below a dam. Fishing below spillways is another form of tailrace fishing in which the turbulent water below the dam creates pockets of water that trap bait fish and attract gamefish.

== Types of tailrace fishing ==
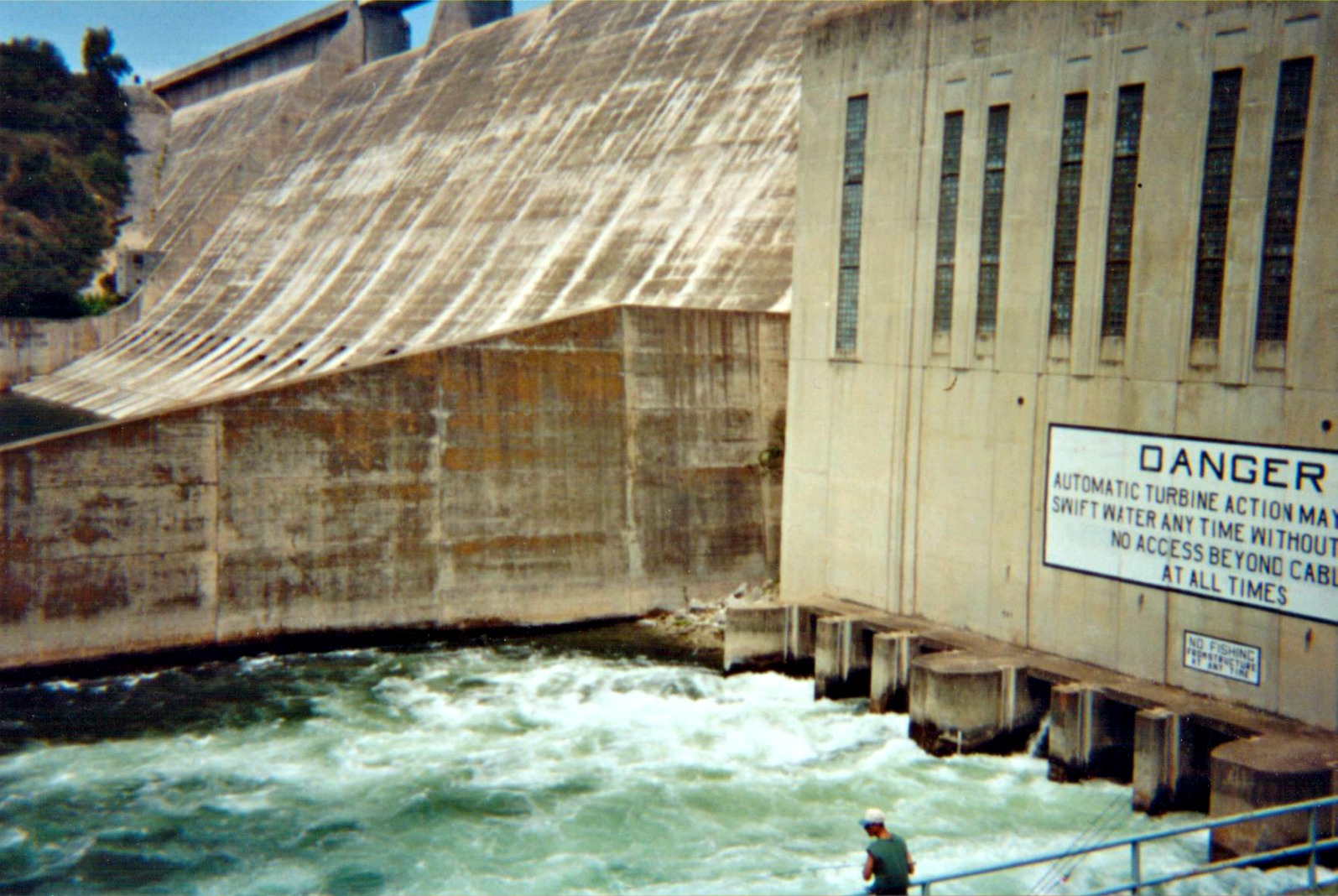
Tailrace fishing at the Mansfield Dam, Texas

Hydro tailrace fishing is a more modern form of fishing the turbulent waters below reservoirs. The term hydro generation refers to the massive generators within a dam structure that are propelled by the force of gravity pushed by the vessel of water through an impeller which rotates the rotor causing lines of magnetic flux thus creating electric current which can then be transmitted as electricity. When vanes or valves are opened the water immediately flows from the above reservoir, causing turbulent water below the dam structure. Generation once started can last for a few minutes and up to months at times if all mechanical conditions and market demand is required from the governing utility or municipality. Hydro tailrace fishing is angling with rod and reel using artificial or live bait through these swift waters.

Kinetic tailrace fishing is angling with fishing rod and reel below a dam, spillway or weir or any structure which has a drop in elevation that causes turbulent or swift moving water at its base. An example would be Mission Valley Dam on the Guadalupe River on the northern end of Lake Dunlap in New Braunsfels, Texas. Free flowing rivers and streams which flow over a Dam structure are the most common types of dams that can provide tailrace fishing.

== Access ==
Hydro tailrace fisherman face many obstacles in securing their rights as a group of fishermen. One example of regaining lost rights is the Freedom to Fish Act that came out of a dispute with the Corps of Engineers attempt to restrict access below dams on the Cumberland River.

== See also ==
- Fish ladder
