= Thomas C. Ferguson Power Plant =

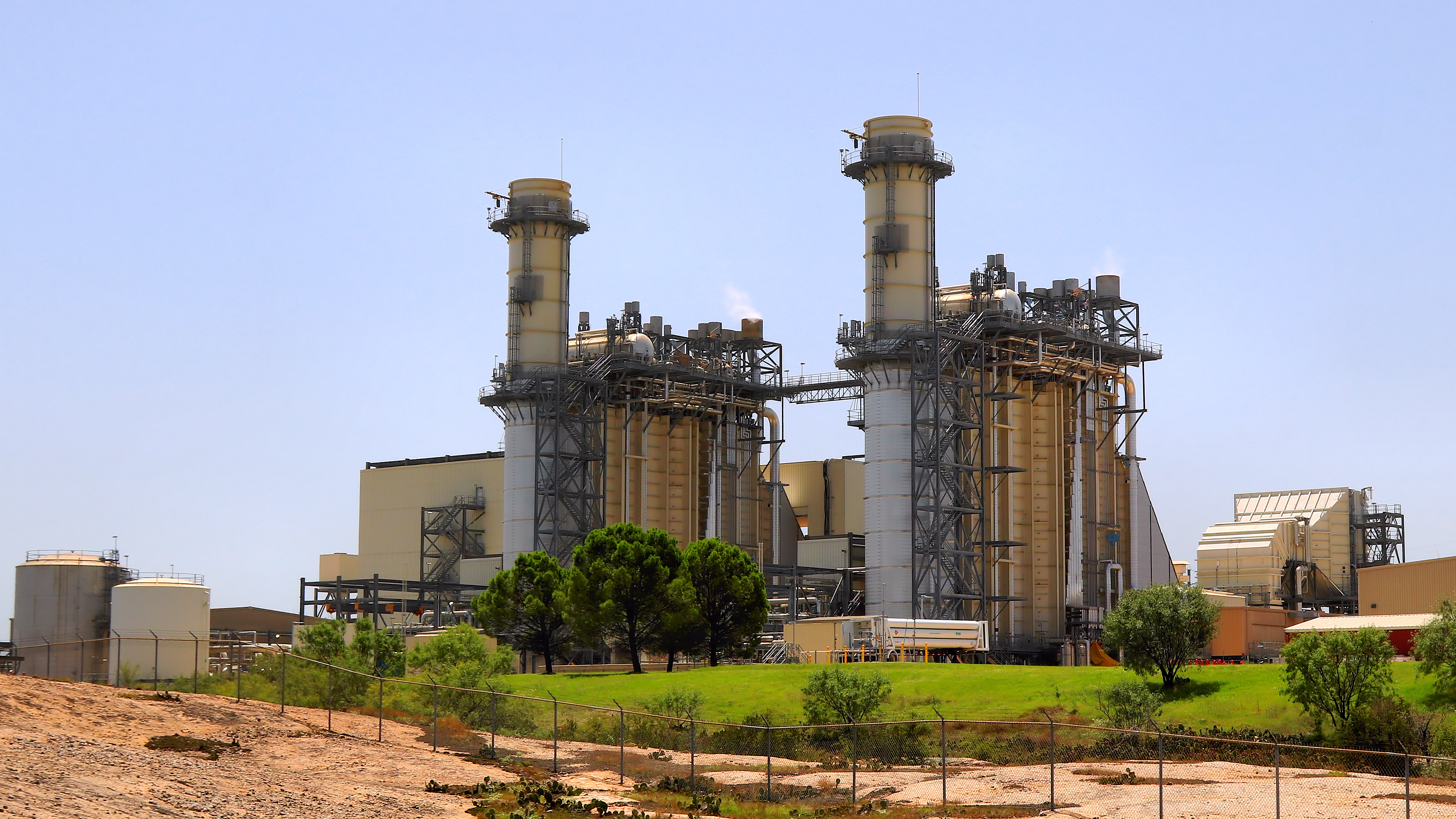
- Country: United States
- Location: Horseshoe Bay, Texas
- Coordinates: 30°33′27″N 98°22′20″W
- Status: Operational
- Commission date: Unit 1: 1974; Units 2-3: October 2014
- Decommission date: Unit 1: September 2013
- Owner: Lower Colorado River Authority

Thermal power station
- Primary fuel: Natural gas
- Cooling source: Lake LBJ

Power generation
- Nameplate capacity: 540 MW

The Thomas C. Ferguson Power Plant consists of dual natural gas fired turbines and a single steam turbine run by exhaust heat from the gas turbines in a combined cycle configuration that generates 540 megawatts (MW) of electricity. The facility is located near Horseshoe Bay in Llano County, Texas, United States. It is owned and operated by the Lower Colorado River Authority (LCRA) and was named for Thomas C. Ferguson, a member of LCRA's first Board of Directors. Cooling water is provided by Lake LBJ, a freshwater reservoir created by Wirtz Dam.

The LCRA broke ground in April 2012 on the project to replace the existing single-unit, natural gas fired 420 megawatt steam turbine plant completed in 1974. Fluor Corporation was the general contractor on the Ferguson Replacement Project. The LCRA dedicated the new $500 million facility, which is 35% more efficient, in October 2014.

During its last years, the original generator only operated during periods of peak demand or when other utilities needed reserve or emergency power. It stopped operating in September 2013 and was dismantled.

== See also ==
- List of power stations in Texas
