= Lake Austin =

Man-made reservoir in Texas, United States

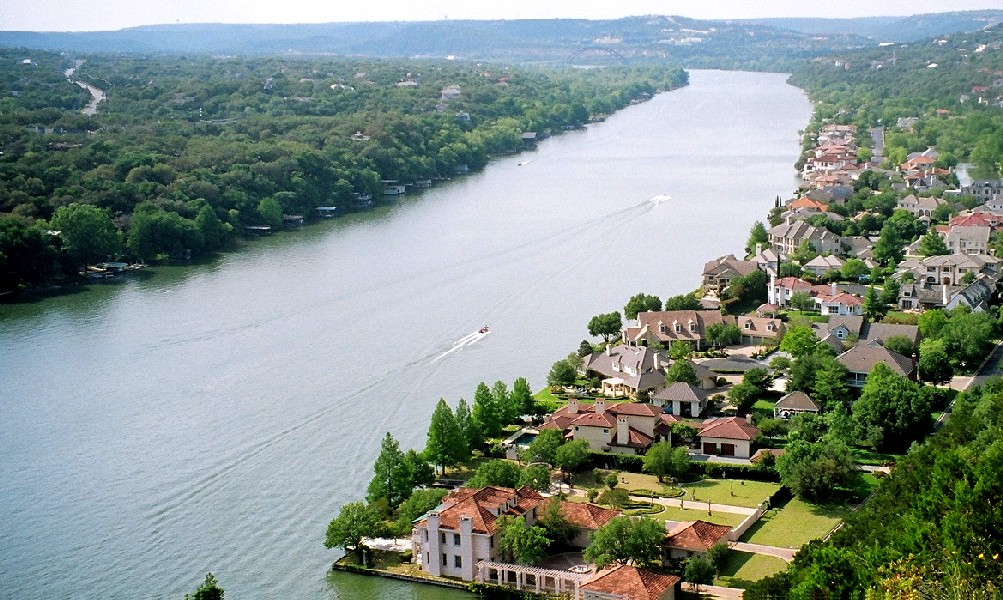
- Seen from Mount Bonnell

- Location of Lake Austin in Texas
- Location: Austin, Texas
- Coordinates: 30°17.66′N 97°47.18′W
- Lake type: Hydroelectric reservoir
- Part of: The Texas Highland Lakes
- Primary inflows: Colorado River (from Lake Travis)
- Primary outflows: Colorado River (into Lady Bird Lake)
- Basin countries: United States
- Managing agency: Lower Colorado River Authority
- Built: 1939
- Surface area: 1,599 acres (647 ha)
- Max. depth: 75 ft (23 m)
- Surface elevation: 492 ft (150 m) above sea level

Lake Austin, formerly Lake McDonald, is a water reservoir on the Colorado River in Austin, Texas. The reservoir was formed in 1939 by the construction of Tom Miller Dam by the Lower Colorado River Authority. Lake Austin is one of the seven Highland Lakes created by the LCRA, and is used for flood control, electrical power generation, and recreation.

== Hydrology ==
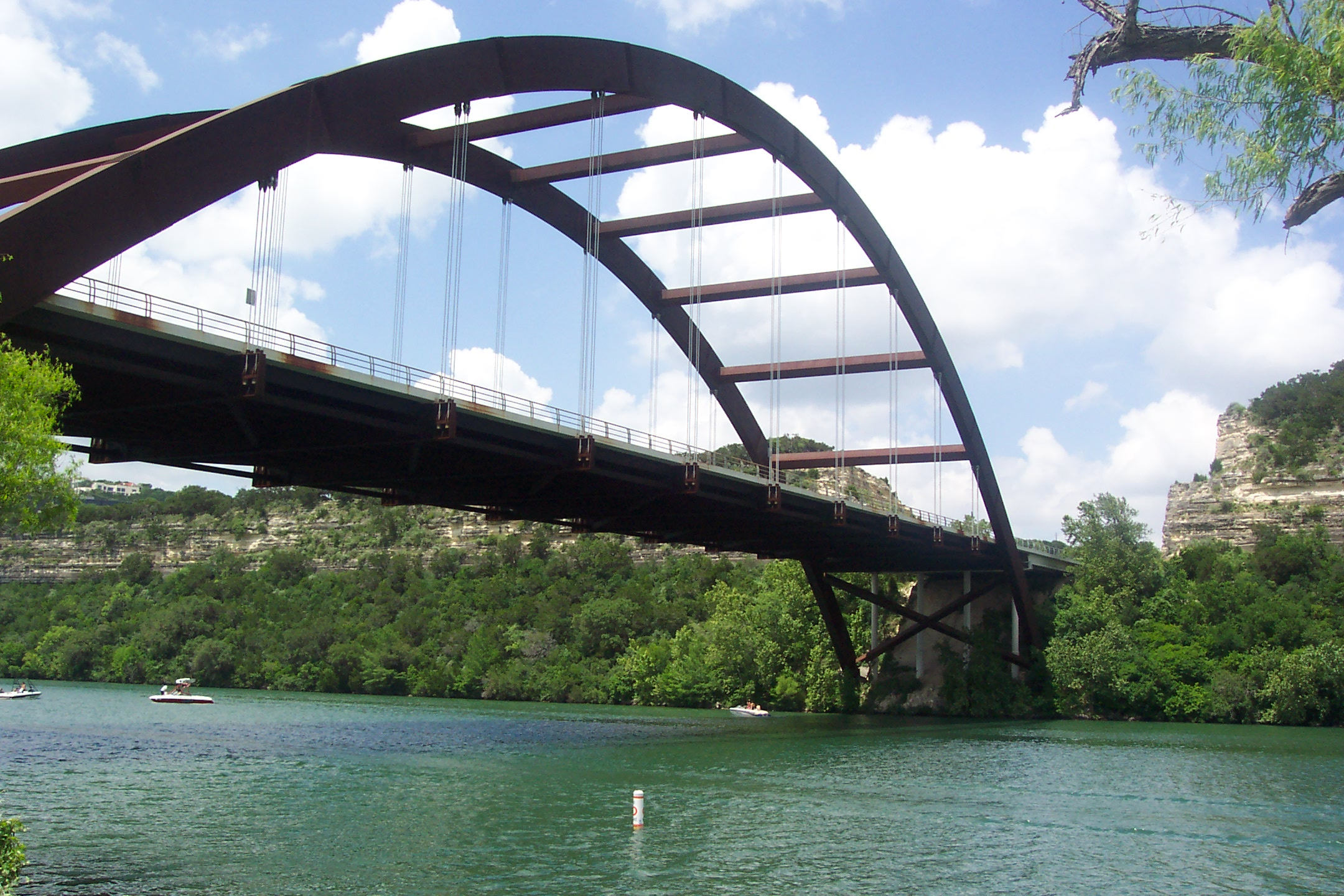
Lake Austin under the Pennybacker Bridge

Lake Austin is a part of Texas' Colorado River; it begins below Mansfield Dam and is principally fed by the outflow of Lake Travis. The lake meanders generally from northwest to southeast, with few significant tributaries; the largest are Bull Creek, entering from the north near where Loop 360 spans the lake at the Pennybacker Bridge, and Bee Creek, entering from the west just above Tom Miller Dam, where the lake ends. Its outflow through Tom Miller Dam then becomes the principal inflow for Lady Bird Lake.

Lake Austin is maintained as a constant-level lake by releases of water from Lake Travis upstream. The other Highland Lake reservoirs on the Colorado River are Lake Buchanan, Inks Lake, Lake LBJ, Lake Marble Falls, and Lake Travis upstream, and Lady Bird Lake downstream.

== History ==
The first lake on the same site was named Lake McDonald, a reservoir formed by the construction of Austin Dam between 1890 and 1893. In 1900 a heavy rainstorm overwhelmed and destroyed the first Austin Dam, causing extensive flooding. The dam began to be rebuilt in 1915, but repairs were abandoned because of a contract dispute, and the unfinished dam was again destroyed in a heavy storm later that year. In 1938 the Lower Colorado River Authority began building the Tom Miller Dam; the dam was completed and the lake filled in 1939.

== Recreational uses ==
Lake Austin is a popular fishing and boating destination. Boaters often engage in activities such as wakesurfing, waterskiing, and gathering in the designated no-wake zones.

=== Boating ===
Numerous companies rent out sailboats, motorboats, jet skis/waverunners, canoes, pontoon boats, and large party boats in the Austin area.

The Austin Parks and Recreation Department offers classes in canoeing, kayaking, and sailing.

=== Fish and wildlife populations ===
Lake Austin has been stocked with several species of fish intended to improve the utility of the reservoir for recreational fishing. The lake is considered to have an excellent stock of largemouth bass. Other fish present include catfish and sunfish.

Lake Austin is one of the Texas Highland Lakes infested with hydrilla, a non-native aquatic plant species. The Lower Colorado River Authority has intentionally lowered the water levels in the lake in the months of January and February so that freezing air temperatures might destroy substantial portions of the hydrilla in the lake each winter. As of March 2014, hydrilla has been completely eliminated from the lake through the stocking of Asian grass carp by the City of Austin. As of September 2016 the grass carp released into Lake Austin have begun to devastate the lake’s natural resources. This has led to a decline in the wildlife native to this section of the Colorado River.
