= Indian Mesa Wind Farm =

Wind farm in Texas, United States

- Country: United States
- Location: Pecos County, Texas
- Coordinates: 30.9209749°N 102.162771838°W
- Commission date: 2001
- Owner: NextEra Energy Resources
- Operator: NextEra Energy Resources

Wind farm
- Type: Onshore
- Hub height: 65 meters

Power generation
- Units operational: 125
- Make and model: Vestas: V-47 660 kW
- Nameplate capacity: 91.9 MW

External links
- Website: www.nexteraenergyresources.com/pdf_redesign/Indianmesa.pdf

Indian Mesa Wind Farm is a wind farm located in Pecos County, Texas. The farm consists of one hundred twenty-five Vestas V-47 660 kilowatt wind turbines that produce up to 82.5 megawatts of electricity. Electricity produced by the project is purchased by the Lower Colorado River Authority (51 megawatts) and TXU (31.5 megawatts). The project is built on land owned by local ranches and the University of Texas. The project was completed in 2001 by Orion Energy LLC and development partner National Wind Power.

NextEra Energy Resources acquired the farm in June, 2002.
