= Wirtz Dam =

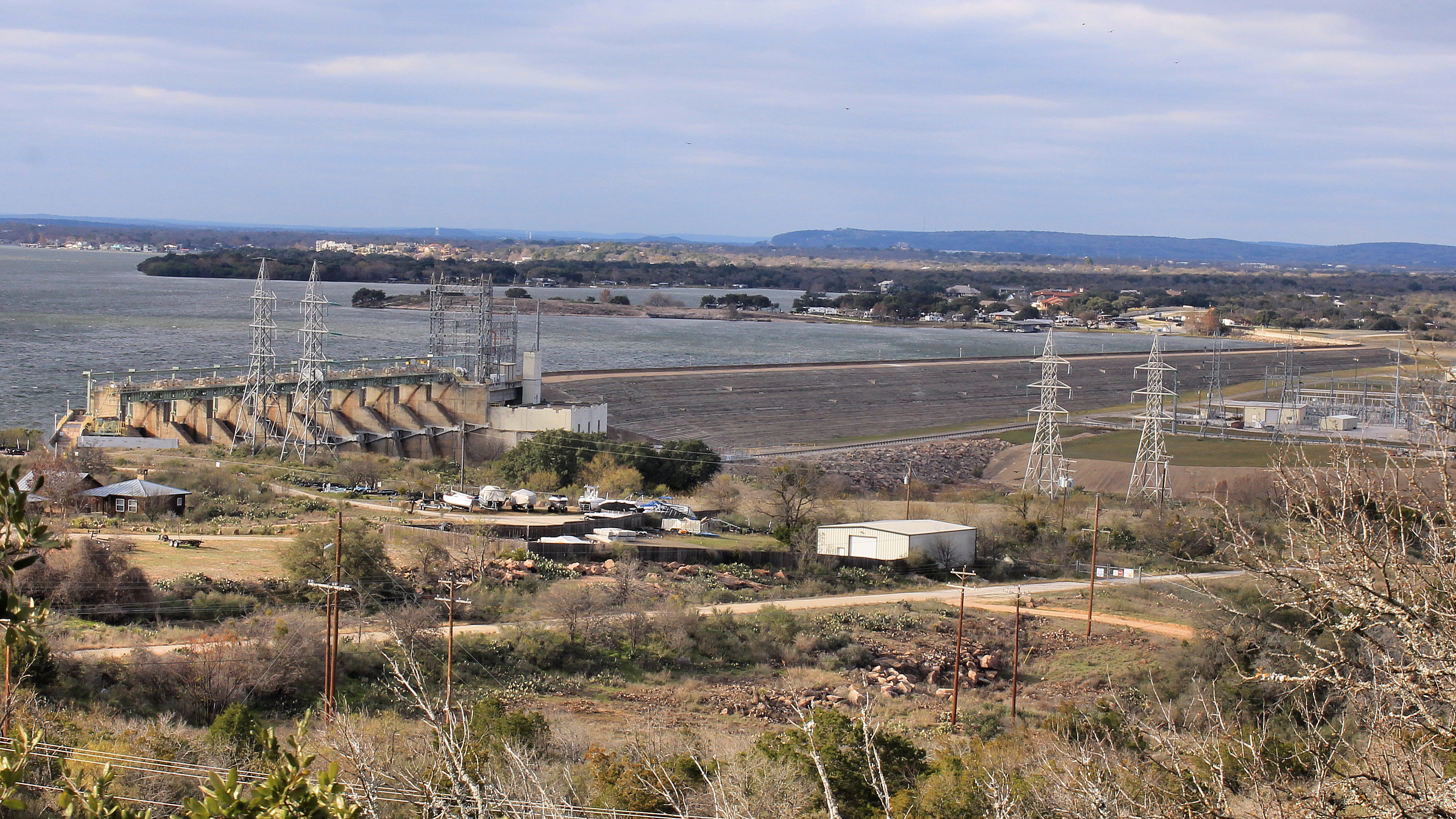
- Wirtz Dam
- Interactive map of Wirtz Dam
- Official name: Wirtz Dam
- Location: Horseshoe Bay, Burnet County, Texas, U.S.
- Coordinates: 30°33′20″N 98°20′16″W
- Construction began: 1949
- Opening date: 1951
- Operator: Lower Colorado River Authority

Dam and spillways
- Impounds: Colorado River
- Height: 118.3 feet (36.1 m)
- Length: 5,491 feet (1,674 m)
- Width (base): 80 feet (24 m)
- Spillway type: 10 controlled bulkhead-gate
- Spillway capacity: 317,400 cu ft/s (8,990 m^{3}/s) (10 floodgates at 30,800; 2 turbines at 4,700)

Reservoir
- Creates: Lake LBJ
- Surface area: 6,534 acres (26.44 km^{2})

Power Station
- Turbines: 2
- Installed capacity: 60 MW

Wirtz Dam (formerly Granite Shoals Dam) was constructed from 1949 to 1951 to provide hydroelectric power and to form Lake Lyndon B. Johnson (formerly Lake Granite Shoals), one of the Texas Highland Lakes. Lake LBJ ‒ as it is more commonly referred to ‒ provides cooling water for the Lower Colorado River Authority's Thomas C. Ferguson Power Plant along Horseshoe Bay.

Wirtz Dam was originally named Granite Shoals Dam until 1951 when it was renamed in honor of Alvin J. Wirtz who had been instrumental in the formation of the LCRA.

Likewise, Lake LBJ was originally named Lake Granite Shoals until 1965 when it was renamed for another advocate of the LCRA, U.S. President Lyndon B. Johnson.

Wirtz Dam and Lake LBJ are located due west of Lake Marble Falls and the city of Marble Falls, Texas.
