= Inks Lake State Park =

State park in Texas, United States

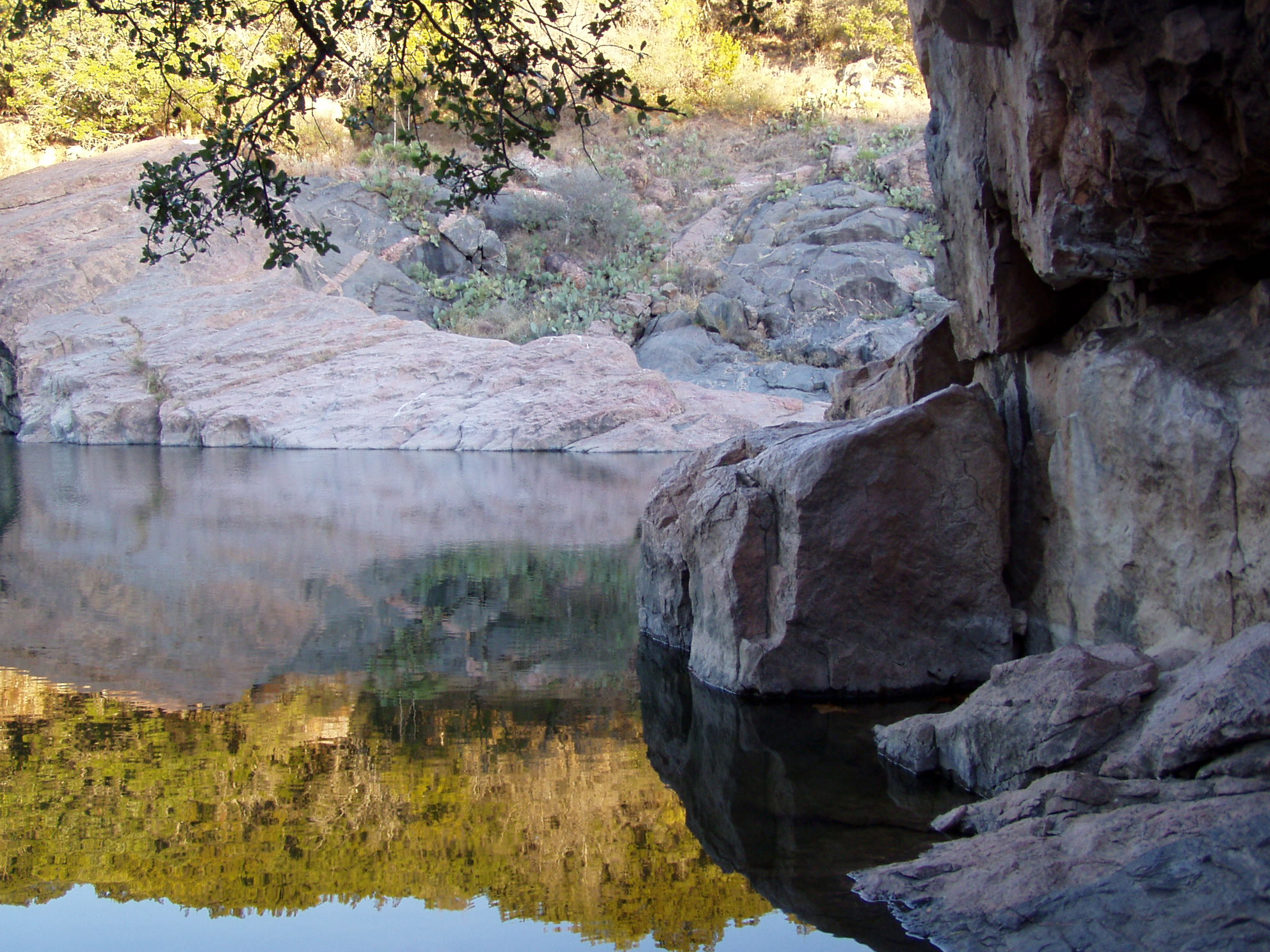
- Devil's Waterhole in Inks Lake State Park
- Location: Burnet County, Texas
- Nearest city: Burnet
- Coordinates: 30°43′52″N 98°22′14″W
- Area: 1,201 acres (486 ha)
- Established: 1940
- Visitors: 222,865 (in 2025)
- Governing body: Texas Parks and Wildlife Department
- Website: Official website

Inks Lake State Park is a 1,201 acres (486 ha) state park located in Burnet County, Texas, United States, next to Inks Lake on the Colorado River. The park opened in 1950 and is managed by the Texas Parks and Wildlife Department. It contains facilities for multiple activities in nature such as swimming, camping, hiking, boating, and fishing. The landscape consists mainly of hills and includes both forest and cleared land made up of mainly gneiss rock. Vegetations such as cedar, live oak, prickly pear cacti, and yuccas can be found inside the park. The Devil's Waterhole is a small extension of Inks Lake, which is almost completely surrounded by rock.

== History ==
Historically the park has provided many resources, employment and recreation.

Many locals suggest that native Americans have used the land for hunting, although there is no evidence of such online.

Initial development was begun in the 1930s by the Civilian Conservation Corps. Although the plans were never fulfilled, a boathouse and road system with dozens of stone culverts were constructed.

== Geology ==
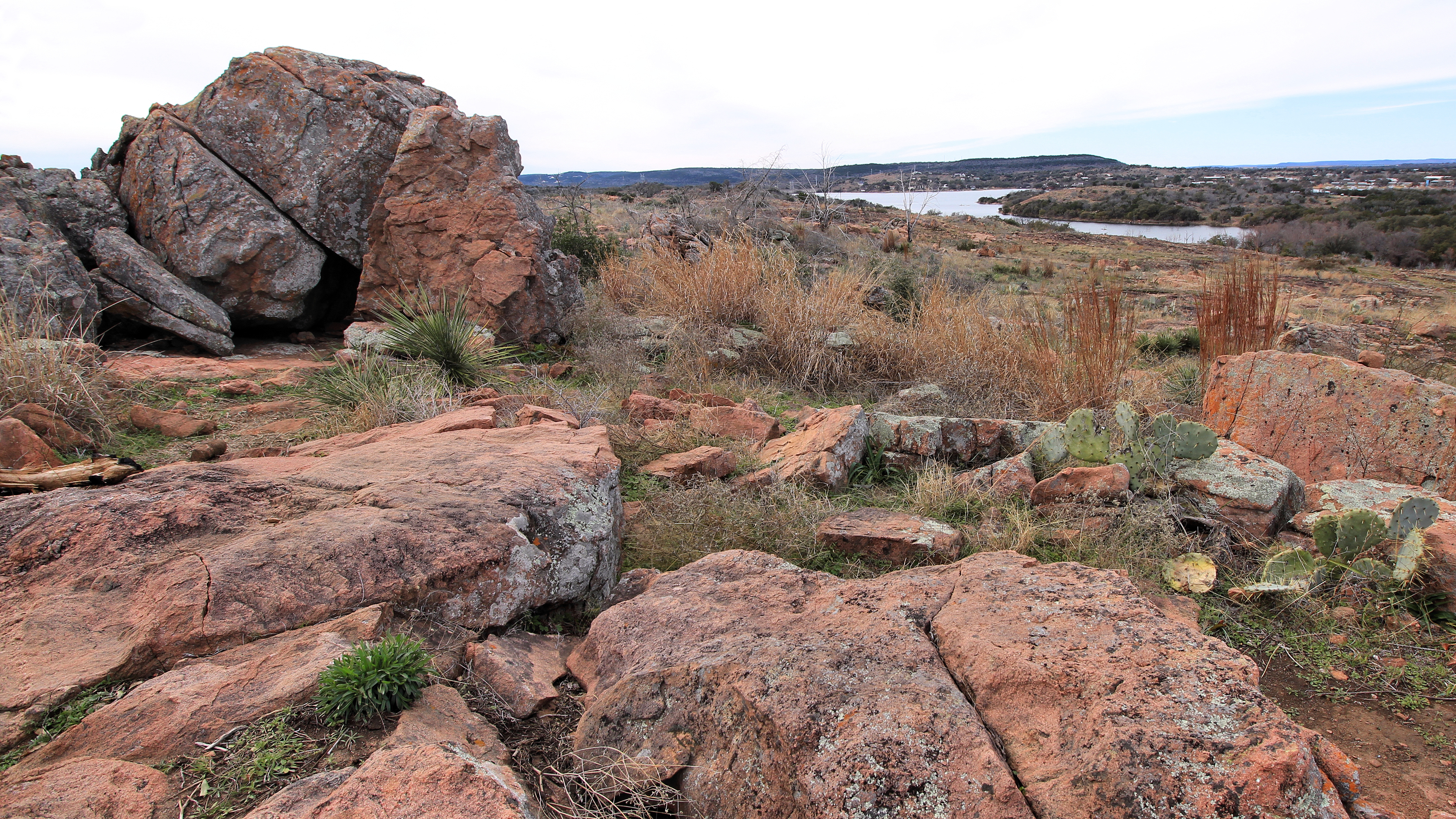
Gneiss rock found throughout the park

The park is located on the eastern edge of a Mesoproterozoic exposure within the Llano Uplift. The local rocks are named for the park as the Inks Lake Gneiss, a granitic gneiss dated at 1,232 million years old.

Rock that appears slightly pink is visible through the limestone rock in the park, a type of metamorphic rock called Valley Spring gneiss. This metamorphic rock is often mistaken for town mountain granite since they are very similar in color and texture. The small granite that only appears in the park has veins cutting through the gneiss in and around the rock.

Over millions of years, intense heat and pressure was frequently applied to the original rock, subsequently forming gneiss rocks. The original rocks were sedimentary (formed from sand, silt, and mud) and igneous (likely granite).

== Nature ==
=== Animals ===
A fox squirrel at Inks Lake State Park (2024)

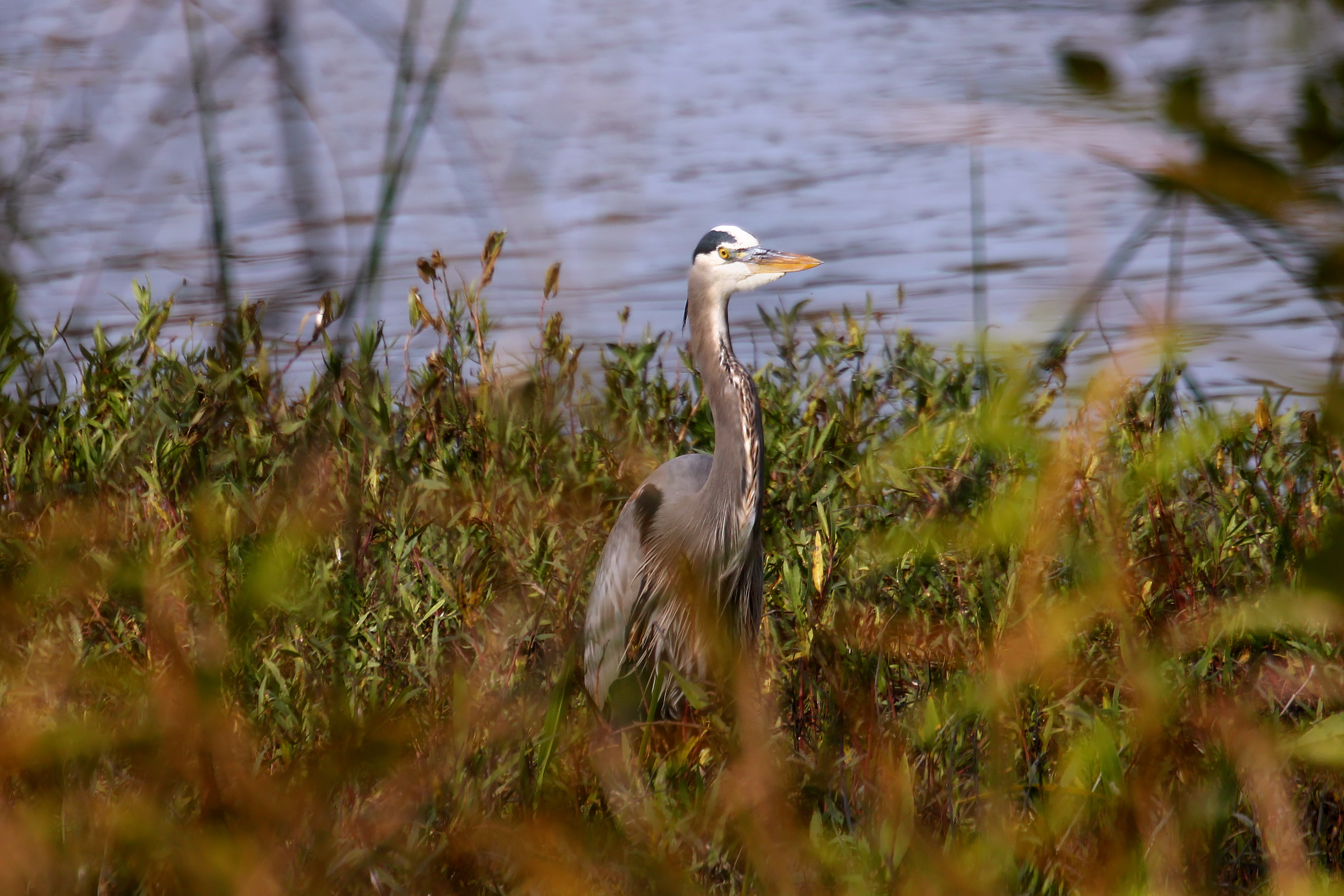
A great blue heron at Inks Lake State Park (2023)

Trees in bloom at Inks Lake State Park (2023)

The most common mammals in the park are white-tailed deer, raccoon, fox squirrel, Mexican long-nosed armadillo, skunk and rabbit. Visitors may occasionally see foxes, ringtails and coyotes.

Common birds include turkey vultures, black vultures, great blue herons, snowy egrets, mallard and wood ducks, northern cardinals, scissor-tailed flycatchers, Carolina chickadees, Bewick's wrens, red-tailed hawks and house sparrows. There is a bird hide in the park.

A number of reptiles have been documented in the park including, western diamondback rattlesnake, western cottonmouth, Texas coral snake, diamondback water snakes and red-eared sliders.

=== Plants ===
Common trees here are Ashe juniper, honey mesquite, cedar elm, live oak, post oak, Texas persimmon, pecan and willow.

Native grasses include blue grama, sideoats grama and buffalograss. Many wildflowers, such as Texas bluebonnets, Indian blankets and Indian paintbrushes, bloom in the spring.

A wide variety of cacti grow in the park, including the prickly pear, tasajillo, barrel cactus and lace cactus. You will also see yucca and beebrush.

== Water conditions ==
Conservation pool elevation usually stays around 888.22 ft. msl; however, this lake does fluctuate about 1 foot annually.

Inks lake water clarity can be seen as clear to slightly stained mostly throughout the year. It tends to have higher turbidity during the rainy season due to excessive amounts of runoff.

Although diving and swimming are allowed at the waterhole, no lifeguards are present.

== Fishing regulations ==
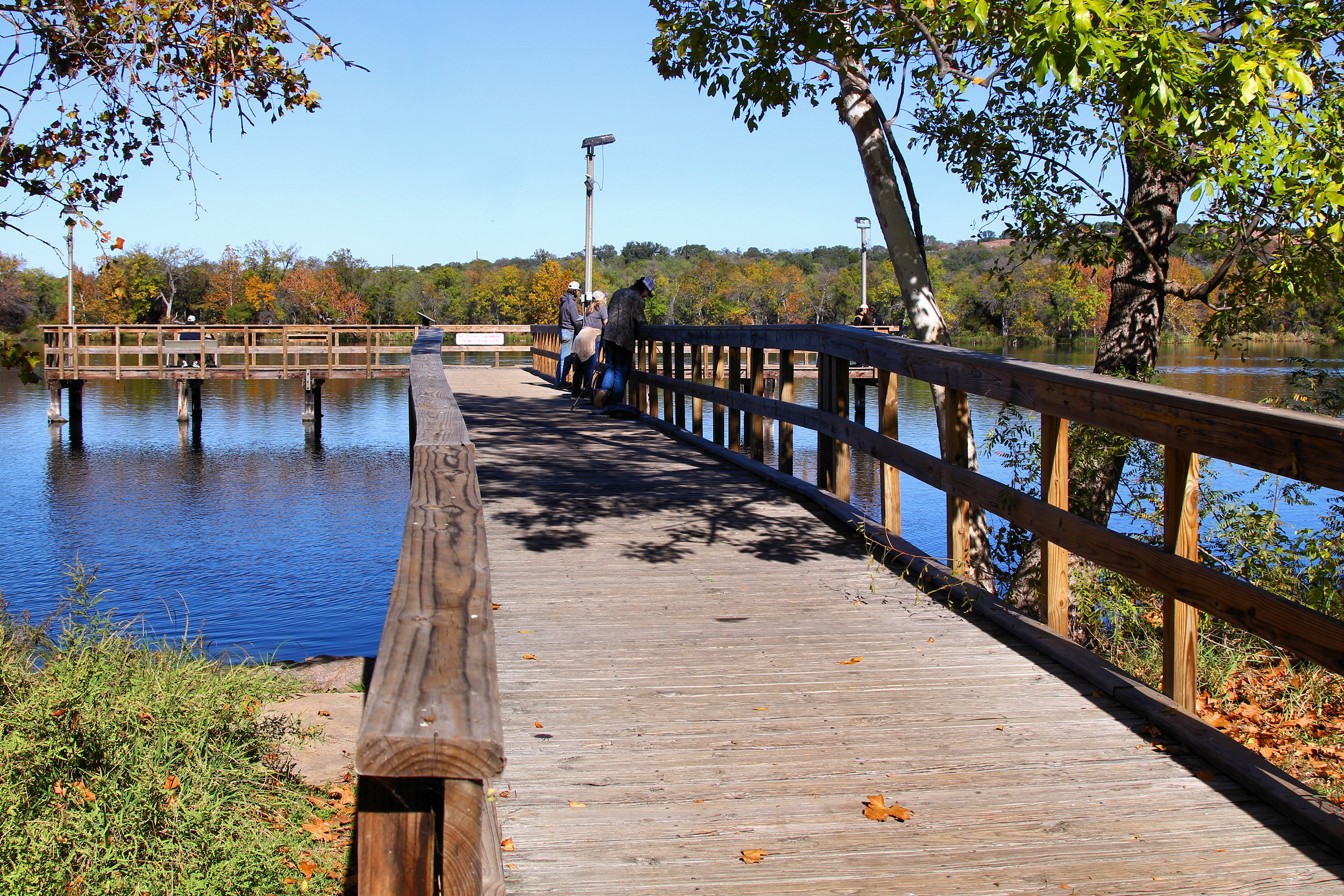
The North Fishing Pier at Inks Lake State Park.

All species of fish in the park are currently managed under statewide regulations. Bow fishers on this lake are subject matter to special regulations which are enforced by the Lower Colorado River Authority.

== Angling opportunities ==
Fish were stocked in the reservoir in the late 1980s and early 1990s, and there atre currently fishing opportunities.

It includes largemouth bass and Guadalupe bass populations, along with several species of sunfish (bream). White bass are regularly caught in the reservoir, and a small white crappie population is present. Channel and flathead catfish occur throughout the reservoir.

Species	Poor	Fair	Good	Excellent
Largemouth bass			x	
Catfish		x		
Crappie	x			
White & striped bass		x		
Sunfish			x	

== Fishing cover/structure ==
Inks Lake offers a wide variety of cover and structure for fish species. The shoreline contains various rock piles, ledges, and rock banks. Brush piles and gravel beds have been placed near fishing piers and other strategic locations to attract more fish.

Several private boat docks, particularly on the west side of the lake, hold fish year-round. Water in the reservoir is fairly clear.

== See also ==
- List of Texas state parks
