= Inks Lake =

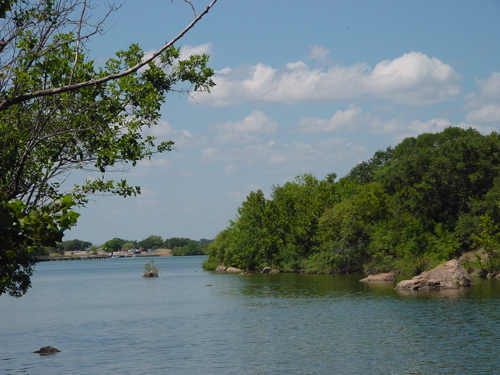

- Location within Texas Location within the United States
- Location: Burnet / Llano counties, Texas, United States
- Coordinates: 30°43.86′N 98°23.08′W
- Lake type: Hydroelectric reservoir
- Etymology: Roy B. Inks
- Primary inflows: Colorado River
- Primary outflows: Colorado River
- Basin countries: United States
- Surface area: 831 acres (3.36 km^{2})
- Max. depth: 60 ft (18 m)
- Surface elevation: 888 ft (271 m)

Inks Lake is a reservoir on the Colorado River in the Texas Hill Country in the United States. The reservoir was formed in 1938 by the construction of Inks Dam by the Lower Colorado River Authority. Located near Burnet, Texas, the lake serves to provide flood control in tandem with Lake Buchanan and features the smallest hydroelectric power plant on the Highland Lakes chain. Inks Lake was named for Roy B. Inks, one of the original board members of the Lower Colorado River Authority, and serves as a venue for outdoor recreation, including fishing, boating, swimming, camping, and picnicking.

The other reservoirs on the Colorado River are Lake Buchanan, Lake LBJ, Lake Marble Falls, Lake Travis, Lake Austin, and Lady Bird Lake.

== Fish and wildlife populations ==
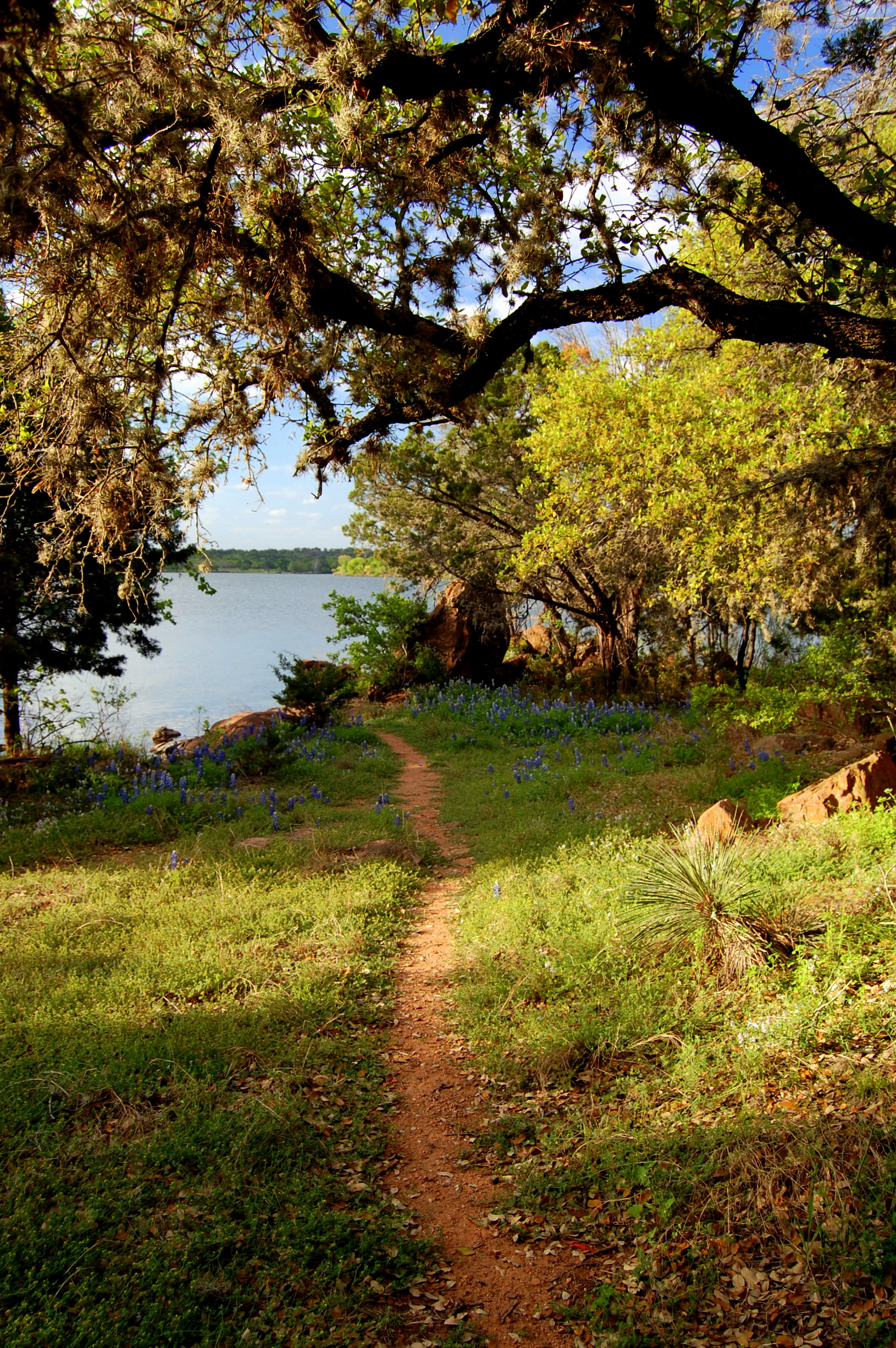
Trail at Inks Lake in the Texas Hill Country

Inks Lake has been stocked with several species of fish intended to improve the utility of the reservoir for recreational fishing. Fish present in Inks Lake include largemouth bass, white bass, catfish, crappie, and sunfish. Inks Lake is a level-controlled reservoir with less than one foot (one third meter) variation in water level annually.

== Recreational uses ==
Some of the property bordering Inks Lake is privately owned. Inks Lake State Park is adjacent to the lake and includes facilities for camping, backpacking, swimming, golf, and boat access. Cliff jumping is another water activity locals and visitors enjoy at "Devil's Water Hole" located within the confines of Inks Lake State Park on Inks Lake. In the 1990s and early 2000s, a fish restaurant was permanently moored adjacent to an RV park on a barge. The restaurant is closed, however the RV park remains. Camp Longhorn, a summer camp for boys and girls founded by Tex Robertson in 1939, is adjacent to the lake.
