= Tom Miller Dam =

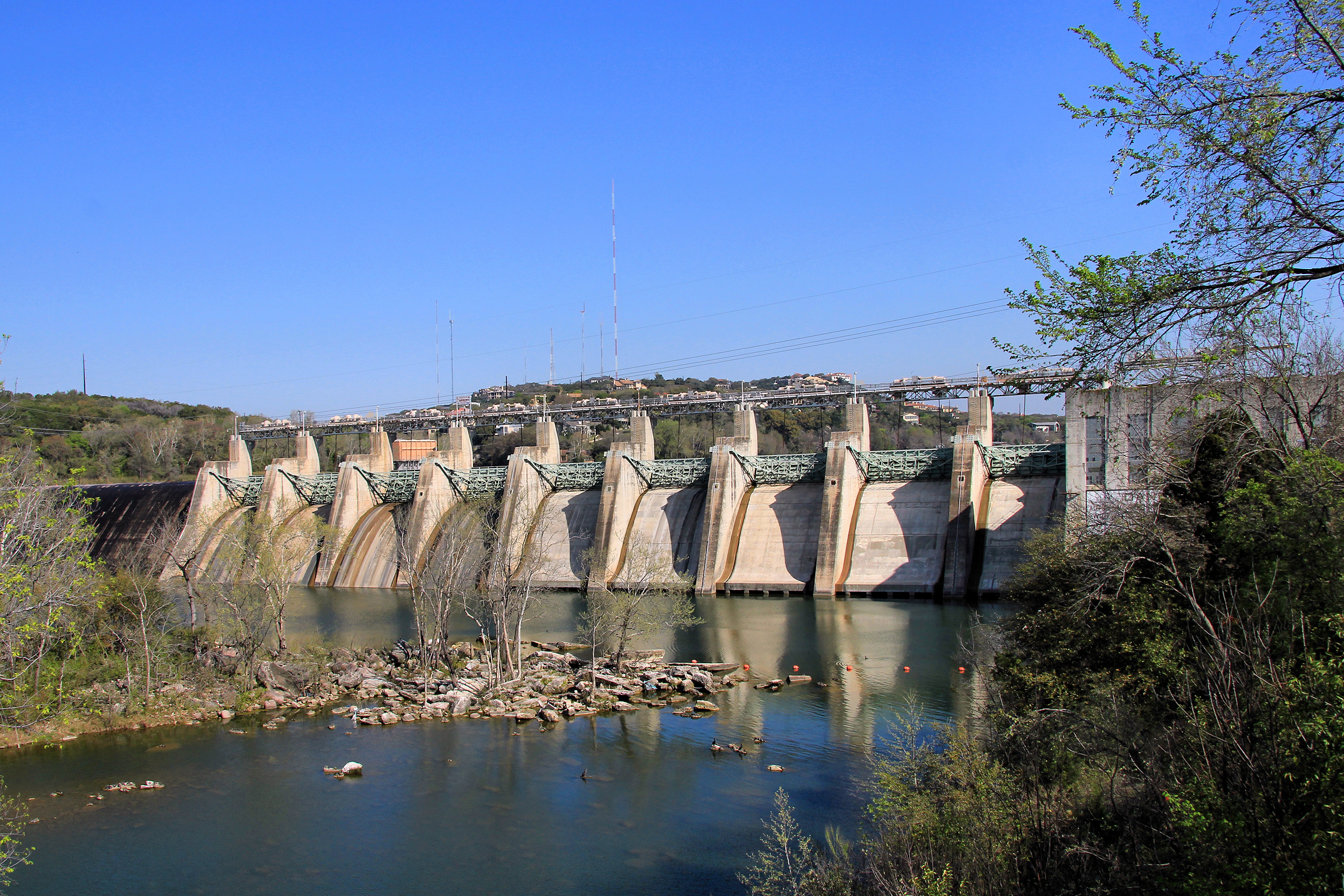
- Tom Miller Dam impounds Lake Austin. The downstream side is the beginning of Lady Bird Lake.
- Official name: Tom Miller Dam
- Location: Austin, Texas, U.S.
- Coordinates: 30°17′38″N 97°47′8″W
- Construction began: 1938
- Opening date: 1940
- Operator: Lower Colorado River Authority

Dam and spillways
- Impounds: Colorado River
- Height: 100.5 feet (30.6 m)
- Length: 1,590 feet (485 m)
- Width (base): 155 feet (47 m)
- Spillway type: 6 controlled bulkhead-gate
- Spillway capacity: 107,700 cu ft/s (3,050 m^{3}/s) (4 floodgates at 15,300; 5 floodgates at 8,600; 2 turbines at 1,750)

Reservoir
- Creates: Lake Austin
- Surface area: 1,599 acres (6.47 km^{2})

Power Station
- Turbines: 2
- Installed capacity: 17.3 MW

Tom Miller Dam is a dam located on the Colorado River within the city limits of Austin, Texas, United States. The City of Austin, aided by funds from the Public Works Administration, constructed the dam for the purpose of flood control and for generating hydroelectric power. Named after Robert Thomas Miller, a former Mayor of Austin, the dam forms Lake Austin, one of the Texas Highland Lakes.

The dam began operating in 1940 and is located at the site of the city's two previous dams, each of which were destroyed during major floods and shared the same name, Austin Dam. It is currently leased to the Lower Colorado River Authority, who maintains and operates the dam.

== See also ==
- Austin Dam failure
