= Max Starcke Dam =

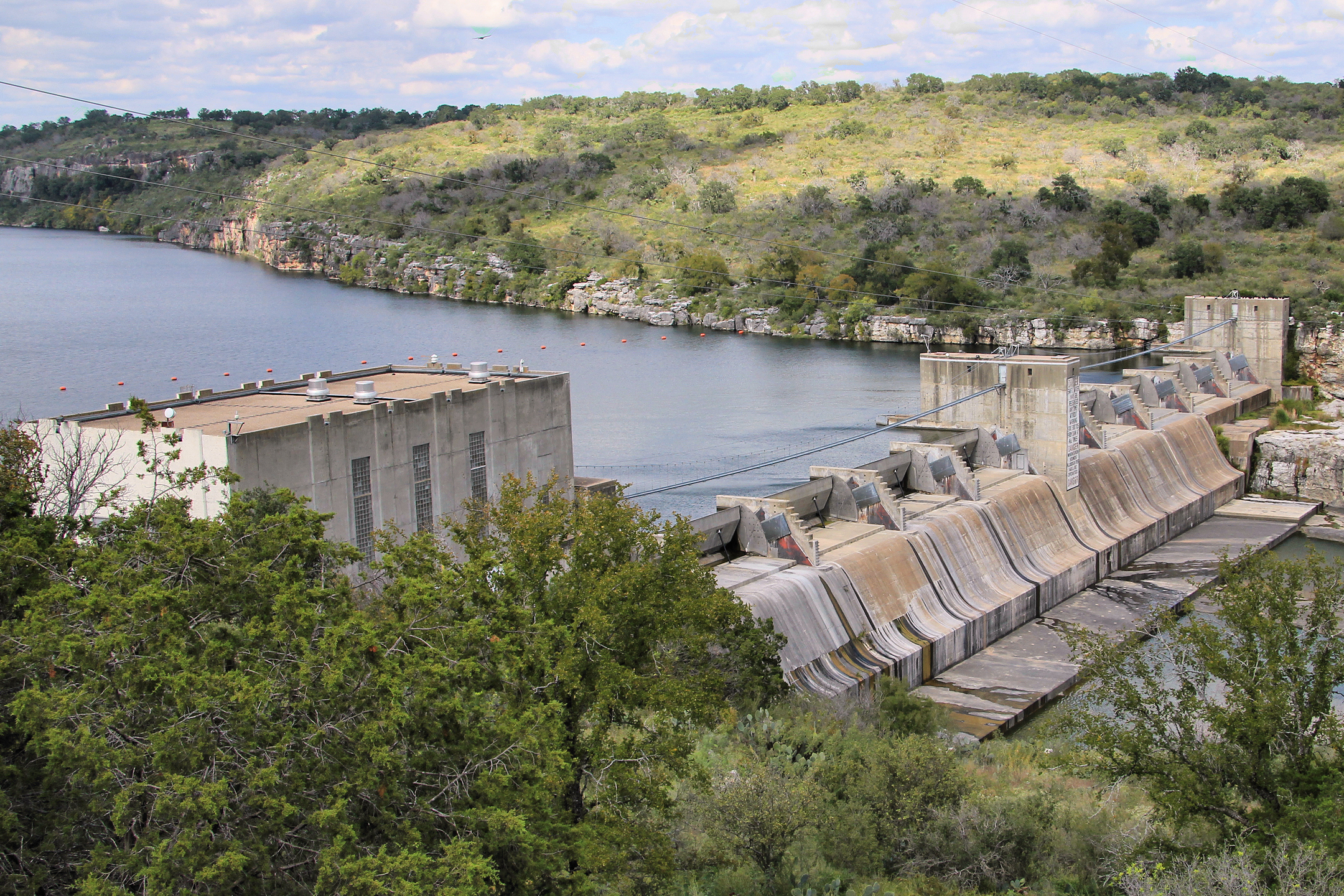
- Interactive map of Max Starcke Dam
- Official name: Max Starcke Dam
- Location: Burnet County, Texas, U.S.
- Coordinates: 30°33′24″N 98°15′24″W
- Construction began: 1949
- Opening date: 1951
- Operator: Lower Colorado River Authority

Dam and spillways
- Impounds: Colorado River
- Height: 98.8 feet (30.1 m)
- Length: 859.5 feet (262.0 m)
- Width (base): 56.8 feet (17.3 m)
- Spillway type: 10 controlled, hydraulically operated crest gates
- Spillway capacity: 109,200 cu ft/s (3,090 m^{3}/s) (10 floodgates at 10,100 cfs; 2 turbines at 4,100 cfs)

Reservoir
- Creates: Lake Marble Falls
- Surface area: 611 acres (2.47 km^{2})

Power Station
- Turbines: 2
- Installed capacity: 32 MW

Max Starcke Dam is a dam in the U.S. state of Texas. Starcke Dam impounds Lake Marble Falls, one of the Texas Highland Lakes. The dam was constructed in 1949–1951 in order to provide hydroelectric power. Located near Marble Falls, Texas, Starcke Dam was the last of the six Highland Lakes dams to be built.

Originally called Marble Falls Dam, the dam was renamed in 1962 for Max Starcke, a former Mayor of Seguin, Texas. Starcke was also the second general manager of the Lower Colorado River Authority and served in that position from 1940 through 1955.
