= Lower Colorado River Authority =

Public utility in Texas that manages the lower Colorado River

Lower Colorado River Authority (Texas)
- Abbreviation: LCRA
- Formation: 1934
- Purpose: Water conservation and reclamation, power generation, transmission
- Headquarters: 3700 Lake Austin Blvd, Austin, TX 78703
- Region served: More than 70 counties in Texas
- General Manager: Phil Wilson
- Main organ: Board of Directors
- Website: www.lcra.org

The Lower Colorado River Authority (LCRA) is a nonprofit public utility created in November 1934 by the Texas Legislature. LCRA's mission is to enhance the lives of the Texans it serves through water stewardship, energy and community service. LCRA provides public power, manages the lower Colorado River, builds and operates transmission lines, owns public parks, and offers community services.

LCRA does not receive state appropriations or have the ability to levy taxes. Instead, LCRA is funded by revenue it generates, the vast majority of which comes from producing and transmitting electricity. A very small portion of LCRA's revenue comes from selling water.

== Power generation portfolio ==
=== Coal ===
The Fayette Power Project is a three-unit coal-fired power plant in Fayette County that provides 1,625 megawatts (MW). (Austin Energy co-owns two of the units and the power they produce.) Lake Fayette is the cooling pond for the project. LCRA uses coal from the Powder River Basin in Wyoming as fuel.

=== Natural gas ===
The Sim Gideon Power Plant is a three-unit natural gas-fired plant in Bastrop County that provides 608 megawatts. The Lost Pines 1 Power Project (owned and operated by GenTex Power Corporation, an LCRA affiliate) is a natural gas-fired combined-cycle plant adjacent to the Sim Gideon plant, and the two form the Lost Pines Power Park. The Lost Pines 1 Power Project can generate up to 511 megawatts. Lake Bastrop is the cooling pond for the Lost Pines Power Park.

LCRA broke ground on a new Thomas C. Ferguson Power Plant in April 2012, about 100 yards from the site of the original Ferguson plant on Lake LBJ. The plant began operating in 2014. The old plant was decommissioned. The Ferguson facility is a natural gas-fired, combined cycle plant in Horseshoe Bay capable of producing 540 megawatts. Ferguson is among the most environmentally responsible power plants in Texas, producing 30 to 40 percent fewer emissions per unit of power than the unit it replaced. It uses about 35 percent less fuel per megawatt-hour and about one-third of the water used at a typical steam plant per unit of power.

The Winchester Power Park in Fayette County provides about 176 megawatts for use primarily during peak-demand periods.

The LCRA buys natural gas on the open market and stores it at the Hilbig Gas Storage Facility, an underground reservoir near Rockne, Texas. The facility can hold up to 4 billion cubic feet of natural gas.

In 2025, LCRA commissioned Timmerman Power Plant Unit 1, a 10-unit 186-megawatt gas-fired peaker plant located in Maxwell, Texas, near San Marcos, Texas, utilizing reciprocating internal combustion engine technology. Unit 2, which is identical to Unit 1, is set to be commissioned in 2026.

=== Hydroelectric ===
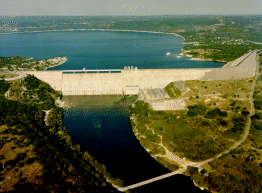
Mansfield Dam, the dam completed in 1941 that forms Lake Travis (the beginning of Lake Austin and an early low-water crossing is seen below the dam)

LCRA operates six hydroelectric dams along the Colorado River in Central Texas that provide a source of renewable energy and form six lakes collectively known as the Texas Highland Lakes:

- Buchanan Dam (54.9 MW) - forms Lake Buchanan
- Inks Dam (13.8 MW) - forms Inks Lake
- Wirtz Dam (60 MW) - forms Lake LBJ, which also serves as a cooling pond for the Thomas C. Ferguson Power Plant
- Max Starcke Dam (41.4 MW) - forms Lake Marble Falls
- Mansfield Dam (108 MW) - forms Lake Travis
- Tom Miller Dam (17 MW) - forms Lake Austin

In keeping with its state-approved Water Management Plan, LCRA generates electricity from the dams only as it releases water for other reasons, or when ordered to do so by the Electric Reliability Council of Texas (ERCOT).

=== Wind ===
LCRA purchases 51 megawatts of wind power capacity from the Indian Mesa Wind Energy Center in West Texas and 200 megawatts from the Papalote Creek II Wind Farm near the Texas Gulf Coast.

=== Transmission ===
LCRA distributes electricity to its wholesale electric customers - mostly municipal utilities and electric cooperatives - and supports the statewide electric transmission network through more than 5,100 miles of transmission lines and more than 380 substations, which are owned by LCRA Transmission Services Corporation, a nonprofit corporation owned by LCRA.

== Water ==
LCRA manages the Highland Lakes and the lower Colorado River, a 600 mi stretch of the Texas Colorado River, as a system to supply water for more than 1 million people as well as businesses, industries, the environment and agriculture in the lower Colorado River basin.

LCRA has the rights to more than 2.1 million acre-feet of water per year based mostly on surface water permits issued by the state of Texas.

== Parks and community services ==
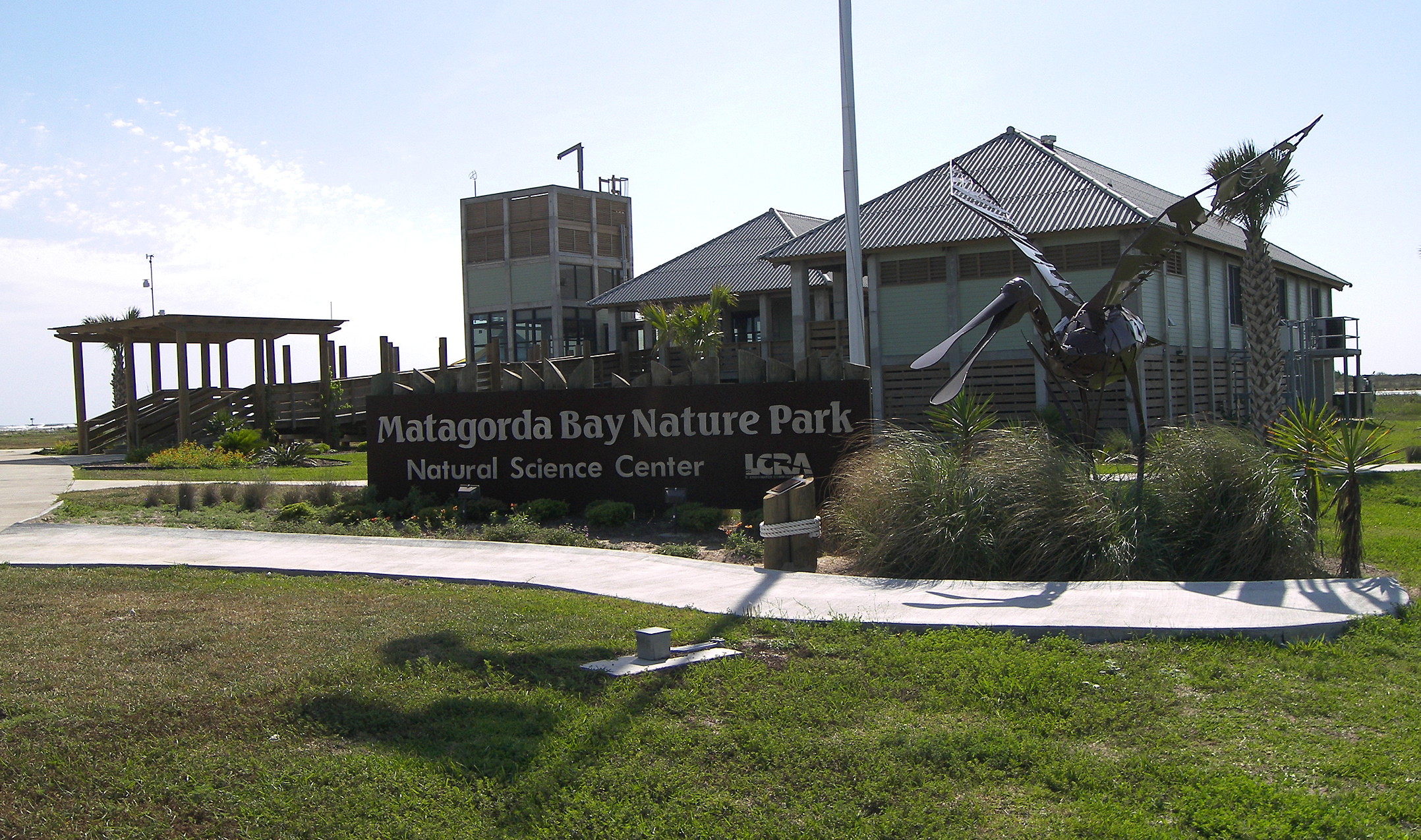
The Natural Science Center at Matagorda Bay Nature Park, one of the LCRA's many parks

LCRA owns more than 40 public parks, recreation areas and river access sites along the Highland Lakes and lower Colorado River. LCRA's McKinney Roughs Nature Park and Matagorda Bay Nature Parks have natural science centers that offer outdoor educational and recreational programs for youths and adults.

LCRA offers a wide range of conservation programs for water users within its river basin. It also operates an environmental laboratory, monitors the water quality of the lower Colorado River, and regulates on-site sewage systems to limit pollution and help protect the health of those enjoying the Highland Lakes.

LCRA's community services programs include the Community Development Partnership Program, which has awarded almost $42 million in matching grants for 1,491 community development projects since 1995.

== History ==
In November 1934, the Texas Legislature authorized the formation of the Lower Colorado River Authority to complete Buchanan Dam, where construction had been idled in 1932 following the financial collapse and bankruptcy of the Samuel Insull-controlled public utility holding company. LCRA began operations in February 1935.

LCRA completed Buchanan Dam and a companion project, Inks Dam, in 1938—the first of six dams that form the reservoirs known as the Highland Lakes. LCRA completed the chain of lakes and dams in 1951. LCRA manages the chain to protect basin residents from the worst effects of Hill Country floods and provide the lower Colorado River basin with a reliable water supply.

With the encouragement of congressman, Lyndon B. Johnson, LCRA used the hydroelectric power from its dams in 1936 to launch a public power program that served communities and electric cooperatives in Central and South Texas.

For nearly three decades, hydroelectric generation was LCRA's primary power source. Growing demand for electricity led LCRA to build natural gas and coal-fired power plants. LCRA added to its generation portfolio with the Sim Gideon Power Plant and original Thomas C. Ferguson Power Plant in the 1960s and 1970s, the Fayette Power Project in the 1970s and 1980s, the Lost Pines 1 Power Project in 2001 and the Winchester Power Project in 2010.

In 1995, LCRA became the first electric utility in Texas to provide wind-generated electricity to its customers from the Texas Wind Power Project, the first such project in the state. LCRA continues to evaluate additional renewable energy options that complement its existing generation portfolio.

LCRA's water and community services operations have grown through the years. LCRA began programs in the 1970s and 1980s to control water pollution and monitor water quality.The Environmental Laboratory Services monitors water quality and various surface water investigations. Each power plant is closely monitored by the ELS lab. It expanded its parks operations beginning in the 1990s to increase public access to the Highland Lakes and lower Colorado River. LCRA also worked with communities in its service area on projects designed to boost communities' economic development and improve their local quality of life.

== See also ==
- Upper Colorado River Authority
- List of Texas river authorities
