= Lake Lyndon B. Johnson =

Reservoir in the United States

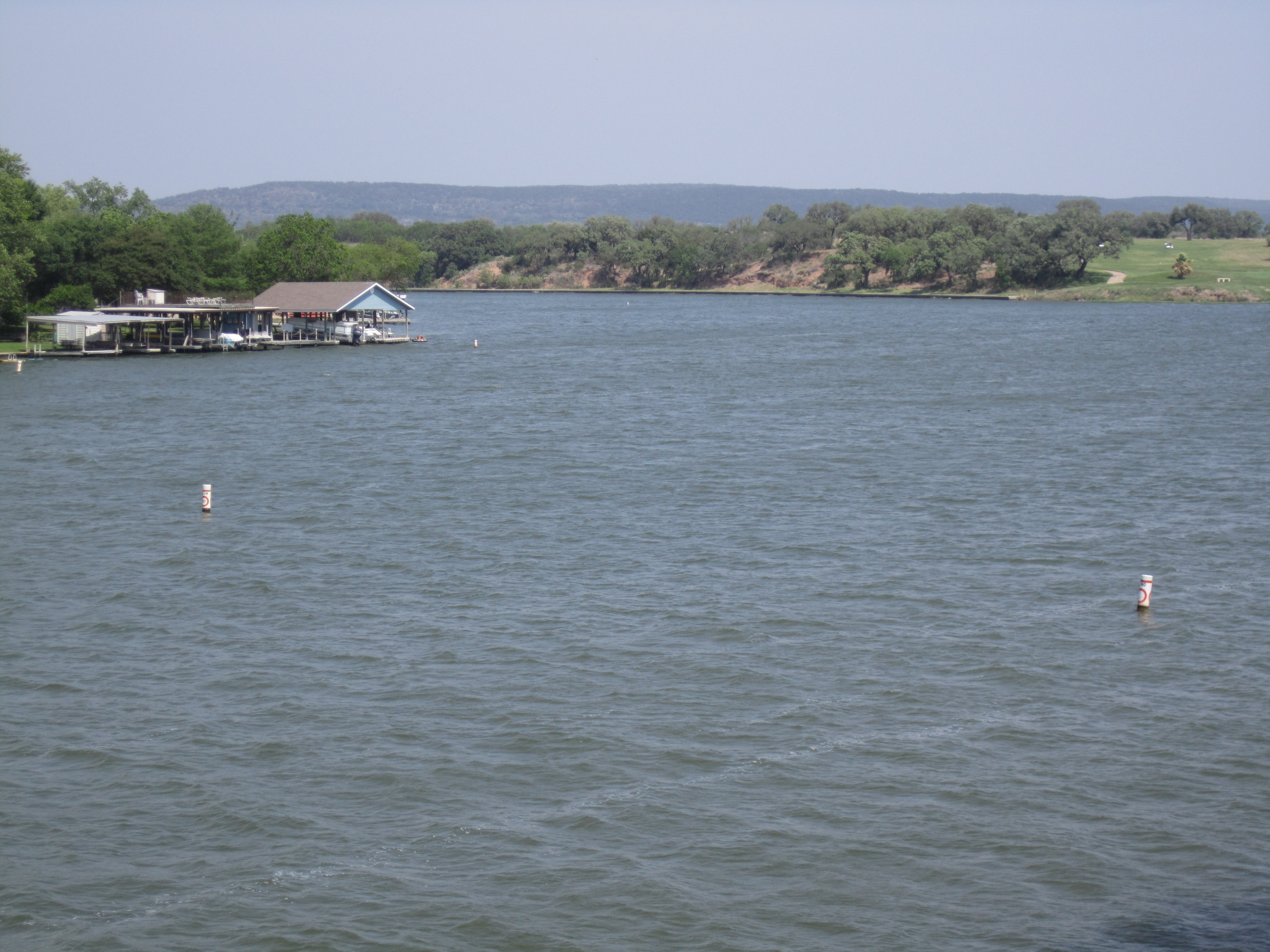
- Lake LBJ at the intersection of Llano and Burnet counties in the Texas Hill Country.

- Location within Texas Location within the United States
- Location: Texas Hill Country; Burnet County; Llano County
- Coordinates: 30°33′20″N 98°20′16″W
- Lake type: Hydroelectric reservoir
- Primary inflows: Colorado River; Llano River
- Primary outflows: Colorado River
- Basin countries: United States
- Surface area: 6,534 acres (2,644 ha)
- Max. depth: 90 ft (27 m)
- Surface elevation: 825 ft (251 m)

Lake Lyndon B. Johnson (more commonly referred to as Lake LBJ and originally named Lake Granite Shoals) is a reservoir on the Colorado River in the Texas Hill Country about 45 miles northwest of Austin. The reservoir was formed in 1950 by the construction of Granite Shoals Dam by the Lower Colorado River Authority (LCRA). The Colorado River and the Llano River meet in the northern portion of the lake at Kingsland.

== Location and history ==
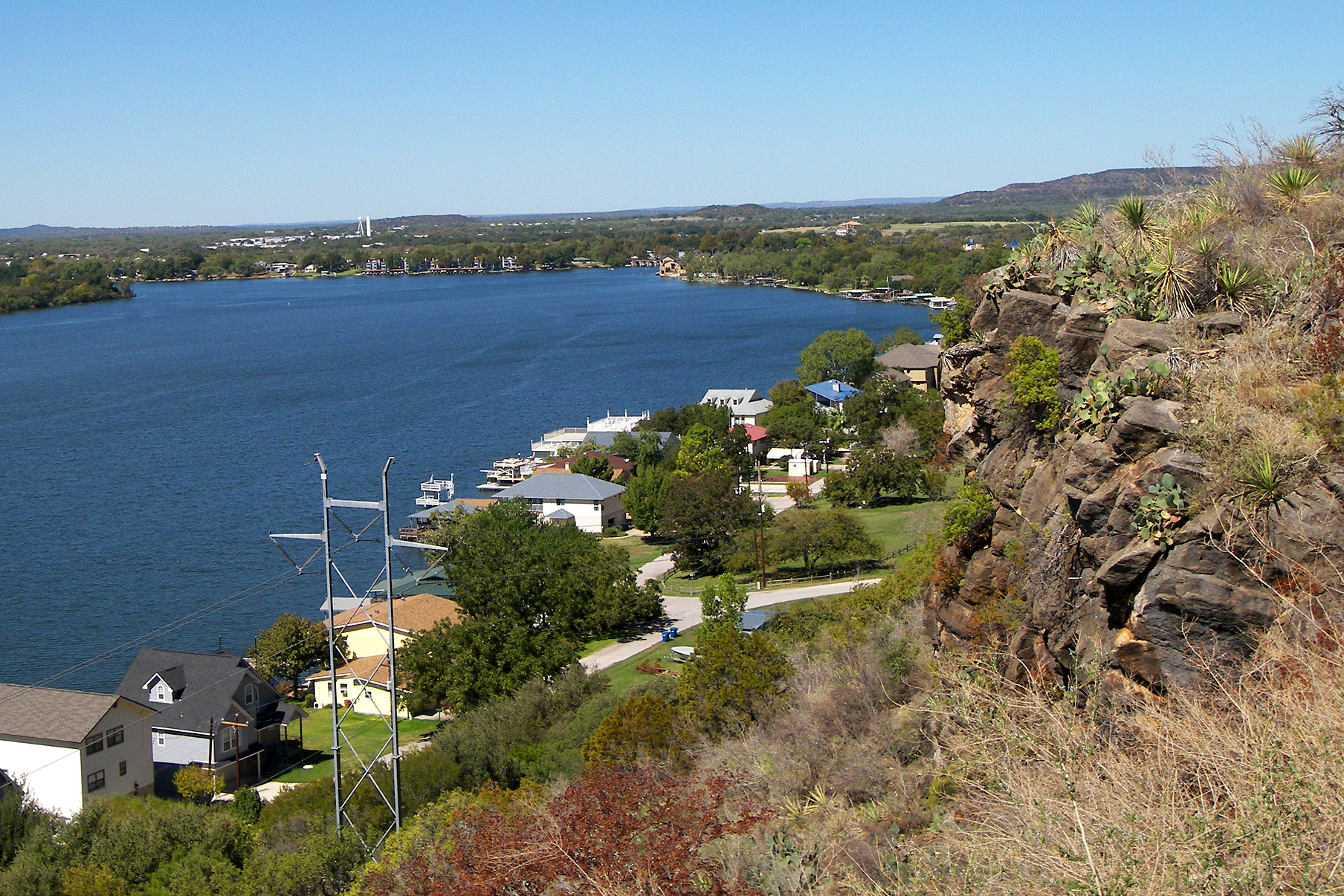
Lake LBJ just east of Kingsland.

The towns of Granite Shoals, Kingsland, Horseshoe Bay, Highland Haven, and Sunrise Beach are located on the lake. The boundary line separating Burnet County and Llano County runs down the center of the lake.

The lake was originally called Lake Granite Shoals. The dam would be renamed Wirtz Dam in 1952 for Alvin J. Wirtz, the first general counsel of the LCRA, and the lake was renamed to Lake Lyndon B. Johnson in 1965 in honor of US President Lyndon Baines Johnson. In addition to his work to enact the Rural Electrification Act that formed the basis for building the Texas Highland Lakes, President Johnson owned a ranch on the lake (which was separate and apart from the LBJ Ranch in Stonewall, Texas). He and Mrs. Johnson entertained national and foreign dignitaries on the lake during his vice presidency and presidency.

The other reservoirs on the Colorado River are Lake Buchanan, Inks Lake, Lake Marble Falls, Lake Travis, Lake Austin, and Lady Bird Lake. Lake LBJ along with Inks Lake and Lake Marble Falls are pass-through lakes for Lake Buchanan and Lake Travis. There is no room in Lake LBJ for additional water storage, and water that comes in must go out. Therefore, Lake LBJ is at a near constant level, but the level can fluctuate, especially during a flood. The LCRA lowers the lake periodically for maintenance on Wirtz Dam and to allow landowners to remove sediment around their docks.

== Fish and wildlife populations ==
Lake LBJ has been stocked with several species of fish intended to improve the utility of the reservoir for recreational fishing. Fish present in Lake LBJ include largemouth bass, white bass, catfish, and crappie. Lake LBJ is one of the Highland Lakes infested with hydrilla, a non-native aquatic plant species, and the LCRA is undergoing treatment to eradicate the hydrilla.

== Recreational uses ==
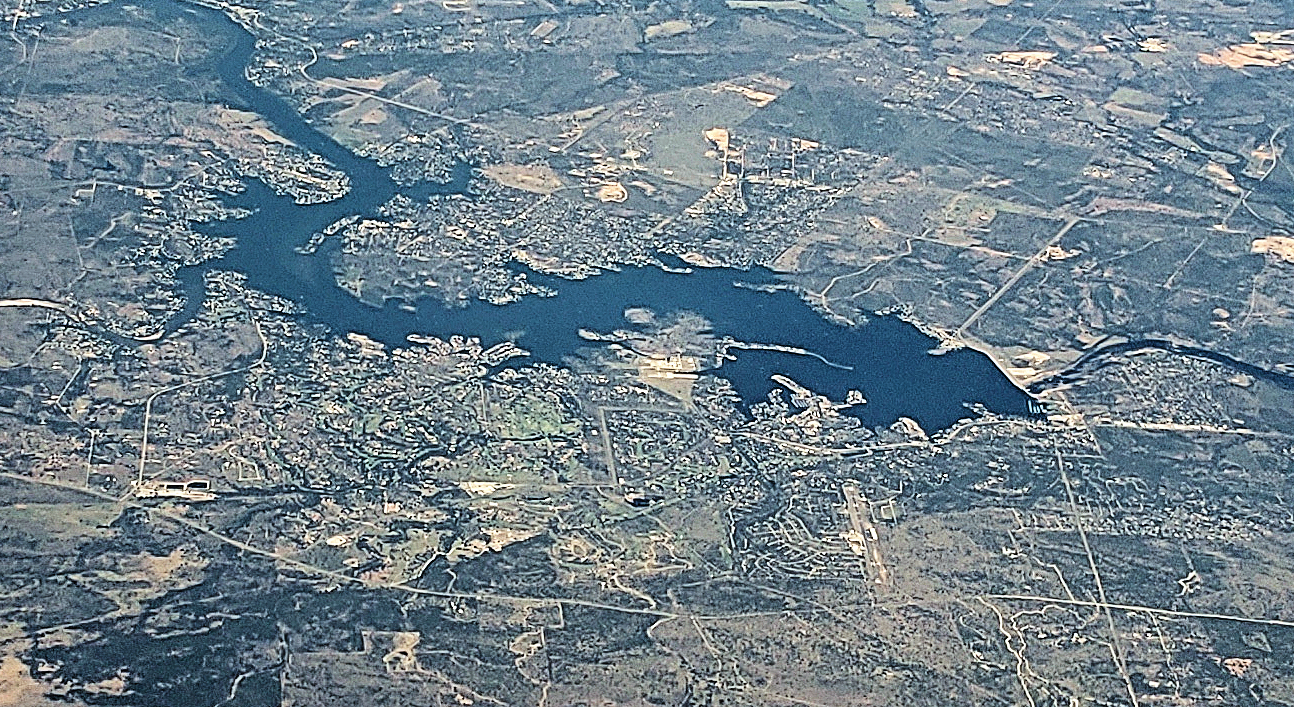
Aerial view of the Lake, looking north.

Most of the property bordering Lake LBJ is privately owned. The Nightengale Archaeological Center at Kingsland is a unique educational park operated by the Lower Colorado River Authority that is adjacent to Lake LBJ. The lake is also home to Camp Champions, the only summer camp with property on the lake. The popularity of Lake LBJ is largely due to its normally constant level water which provides ideal conditions for boating, water skiing, riding personal water craft and other water sports. Swimming in summer months is inadvisable due to the presence of the rare but deadly Naegleria fowleri.

== Cooling water ==
The lake provides cooling water for the Thomas C. Ferguson Power Plant that is located on its shores.

== See also ==
- List of memorials to Lyndon B. Johnson
