= Longhorn Dam =

Dam in Austin, Texas, U.S.

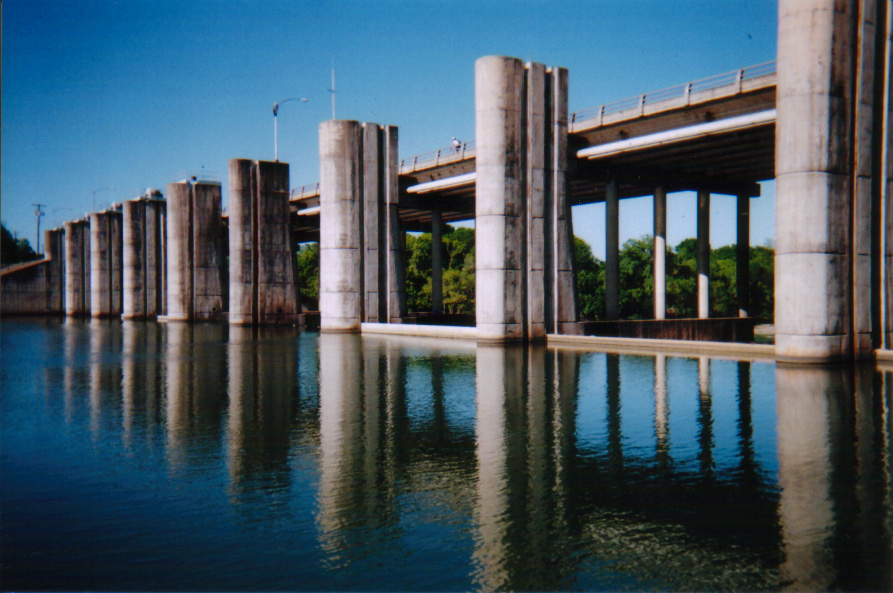
- The upstream side of Longhorn Dam in 2005

- Location within Texas
- Interactive map of Longhorn Dam
- Official name: Longhorn Dam
- Location: Austin, Texas, U.S.
- Opening date: 1960
- Operator: City of Austin

Dam and spillways
- Impounds: Colorado River
- Height: 36 feet (11 m)
- Length: 506 feet (154 m)

Reservoir
- Creates: Lady Bird Lake
- Surface area: 471 acres (191 ha)

Longhorn Dam is a dam crossing the Colorado River in Austin, Texas, United States, where it creates Lady Bird Lake. Completed in 1960, the dam was built by the City of Austin as the last in a chain of Colorado River dams in central Texas begun during the Great Depression. The name refers to its location on a ford used for longhorn cattle drives as a part of the Chisholm Trail in the late 19th century. The dam is also a bridge for Pleasant Valley Road.

== History ==
Longhorn Dam was constructed in the late 1950s to establish a cooling reservoir for Austin's Holly Street Power Plant, a 570-megawatt natural gas and fuel oil-fired electrical power plant. The reservoir it created, Lady Bird Lake, was also originally used as a source of drinking water for the city. It is not a hydroelectric dam and generates no electrical power.

In 2007, the power plant was decommissioned and subsequently demolished to make way for a new lakeside urban park; today, the reservoir's major uses are recreation and fishing. The stabilization of the downtown shoreline that the dam afforded enabled substantial parkland development along the newly created lake, including Auditorium Shores and other parts of Town Lake Park.

In the 2000s and 2010s, the aging dam's floodgates experienced a series of malfunctions, causing on some occasions, the loss of substantial amounts of water down the river (when gates failed to close properly).

The dam was originally constructed and operated by Austin Energy, the city power utility, but Austin Water took over operations of the dam in April 2018.

Since 2013, Austin Energy made several maintenance and upkeep projects to the dam such as replacing all major parts and rebuilding both hydraulic bascule systems. Austin Energy also repaired one of the gates and overhauled the mechanical lifting system.

City officials have estimated the cost of replacing the dam in the tens of millions of dollars.

Between 2013 and 2018, Austin Energy spent $1.6 million in maintenance and repair costs.

== Geography and hydrography ==
Longhorn Dam is located at 30.2504°, -97.7135° (WGS 84 datum), with a full water level at 428 feet (130 m) above sea level. The reservoir impoundment length is 5.75 miles (9.3 km), creating Lady Bird Lake (formerly called Town Lake), a freshwater lake with a surface area of 471 acres (191 ha). Water release through the dam varies with rainfall and with the seasonal demand for irrigation water downstream.

== Structure and function ==
The dam stands 36 feet (11 m) high and runs a length of 506 feet (154 m) across the Colorado River. It includes nine floodgates that are used to control water release and maintain a stable water level in the reservoir. Two are bascule gates that passively allow water to flow through to maintain Lady Bird Lake's water level; the other seven are lift gates that are controlled manually to adjust water flow in response to weather conditions and water releases for downstream ecology and irrigation.
