= Inks Dam =

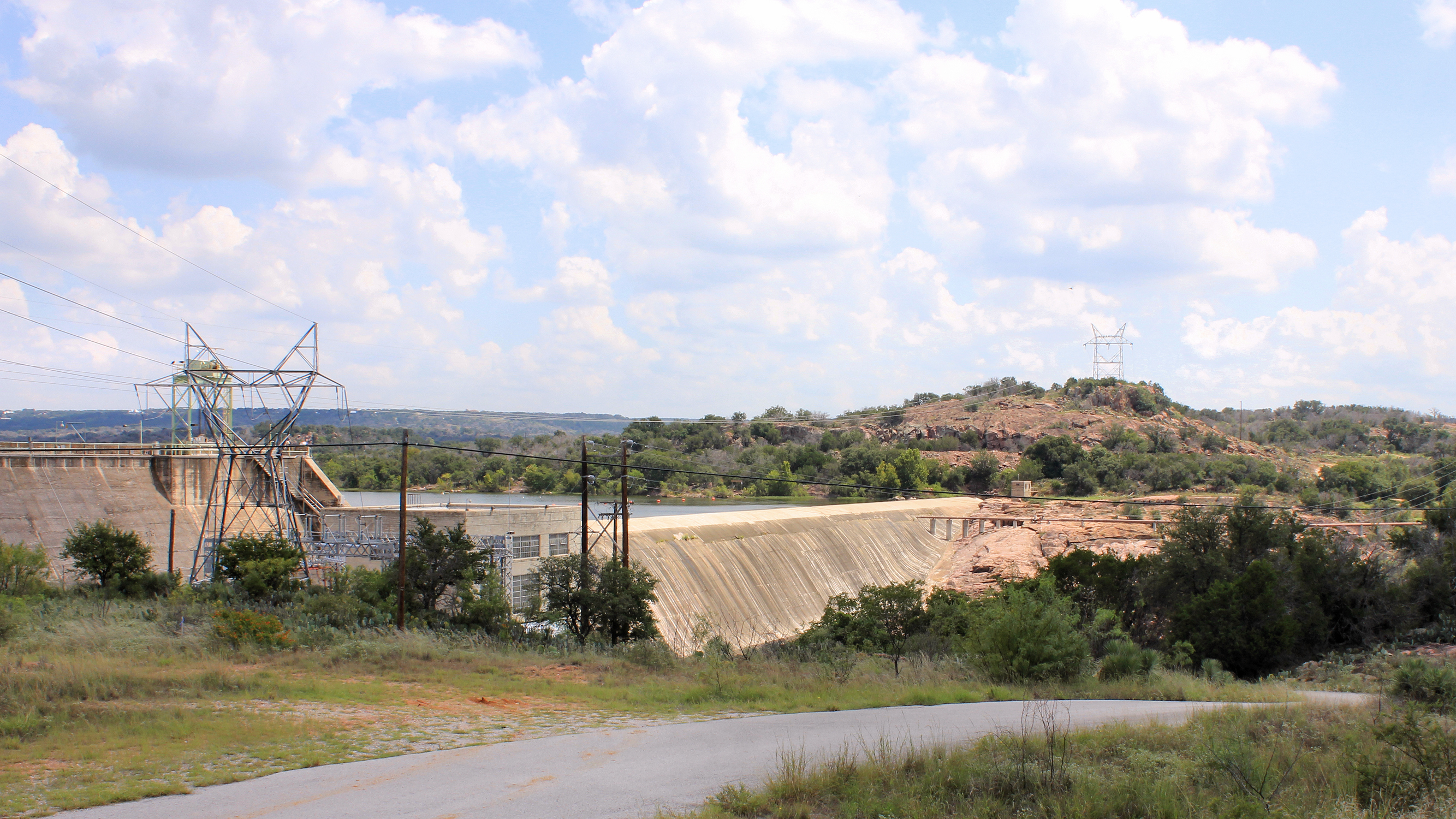
- Official name: Inks Dam
- Location: Burnet / Llano counties, Texas, U.S.
- Coordinates: 30°43′52″N 98°23′5″W
- Construction began: 1936
- Opening date: 1938
- Operator: Lower Colorado River Authority

Dam and spillways
- Impounds: Colorado River
- Height: 96.5 feet (29.4 m)
- Length: 1,547.5 feet (471.7 m)
- Width (base): 75.1 feet (22.9 m)

Reservoir
- Creates: Inks Lake

Power Station
- Turbines: 1
- Installed capacity: 13.8 MW

Inks Dam was constructed from 1936 to 1938 and forms Inks Lake, one of the seven Texas Highland Lakes. The lake and dam are owned and operated by the Lower Colorado River Authority for hydropower generation and recreational purposes and are named for Roy B. Inks, one of the original members on the LCRA Board of Directors.

The Dam is also home to a national fish hatchery. Located just downriver from the spillway, Inks Dam NFH has 30 ponds ranging in size from 0.25 to 1.5 acres (0.10 to 0.61 ha) with a total of 28 acres (11 ha) for fish production. The facility also has an isolation building for endangered species containing aquariums of various sizes of circular tanks.
