= Horseshoe Bay, Texas =

- City
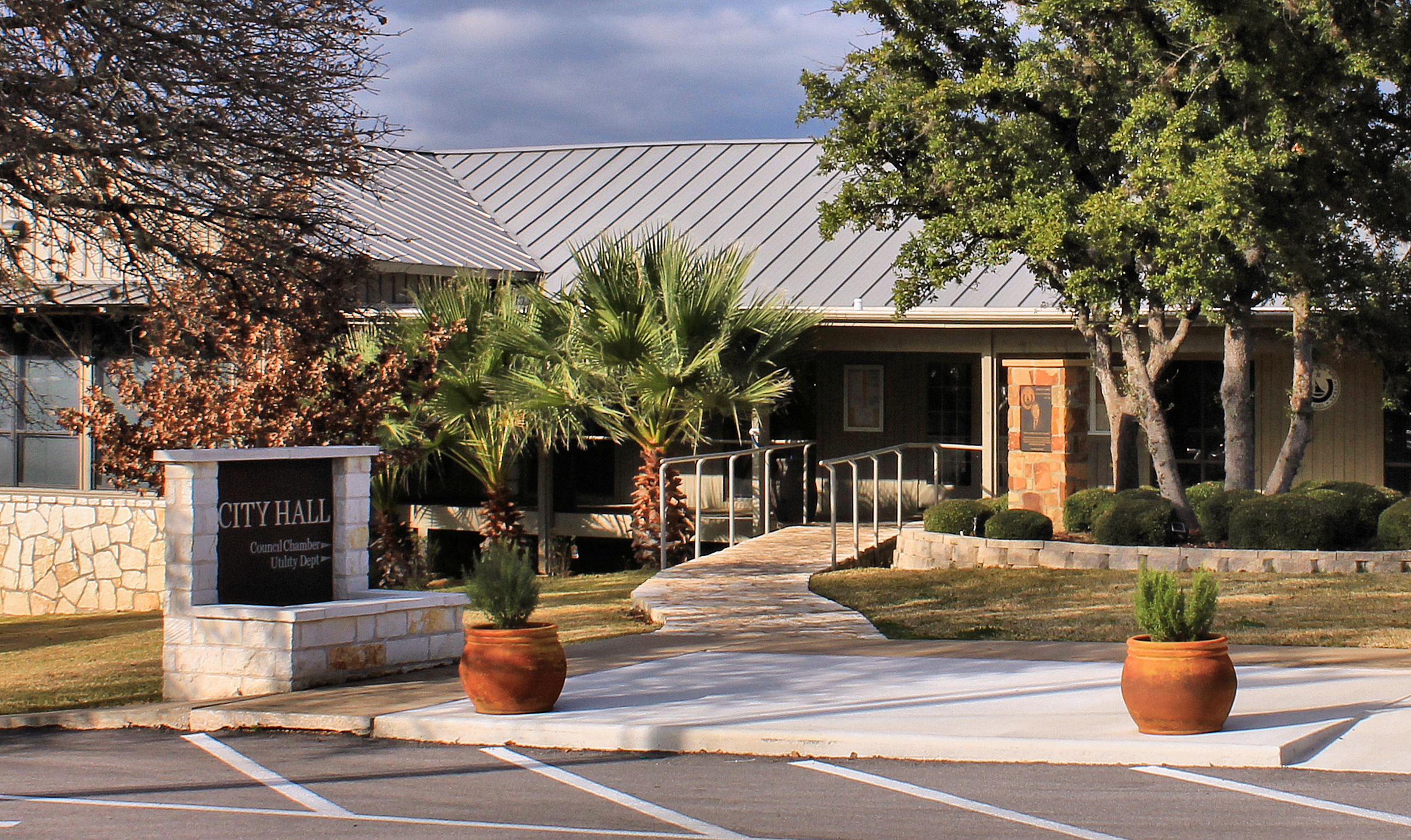
- Horseshoe Bay City Hall

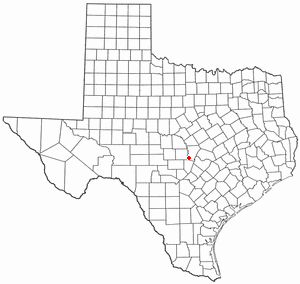
- Location of Horseshoe Bay, Texas

- Coordinates: 30°32′23″N 98°22′30″W
- Country: United States
- State: Texas
- Counties: Llano, Burnet

Area
  - Total: 16.59 sq mi (42.96 km^{2})
  - Land: 14.32 sq mi (37.10 km^{2})
  - Water: 2.26 sq mi (5.86 km^{2})
- Elevation: 883 ft (269 m)

Population (2020)
  - Total: 4,257
  - Density: 297.2/sq mi (114.7/km^{2})
- Time zone: UTC-6 (Central (CST))
  - Summer (DST): UTC-5 (CDT)
- ZIP codes: 78654, 78657
- Area code: 830
- FIPS code: 48-34862
- GNIS feature ID: 2410794
- Website: www.horseshoe-bay-tx.gov

Horseshoe Bay is a city in Llano and Burnet counties in the U.S. state of Texas.

Situated on Lake Lyndon B. Johnson and the south branch of the Colorado River, it is known in the region for its golf courses, hotel and resort, and water sports. Prior to its incorporation in September 2005, it was a census-designated place (CDP). The CDP population was 3,337 at the 2000 census. The 2010 census put the population at 3,418. The 2020 Decennial Census reported population was 4,257.

== Geography ==
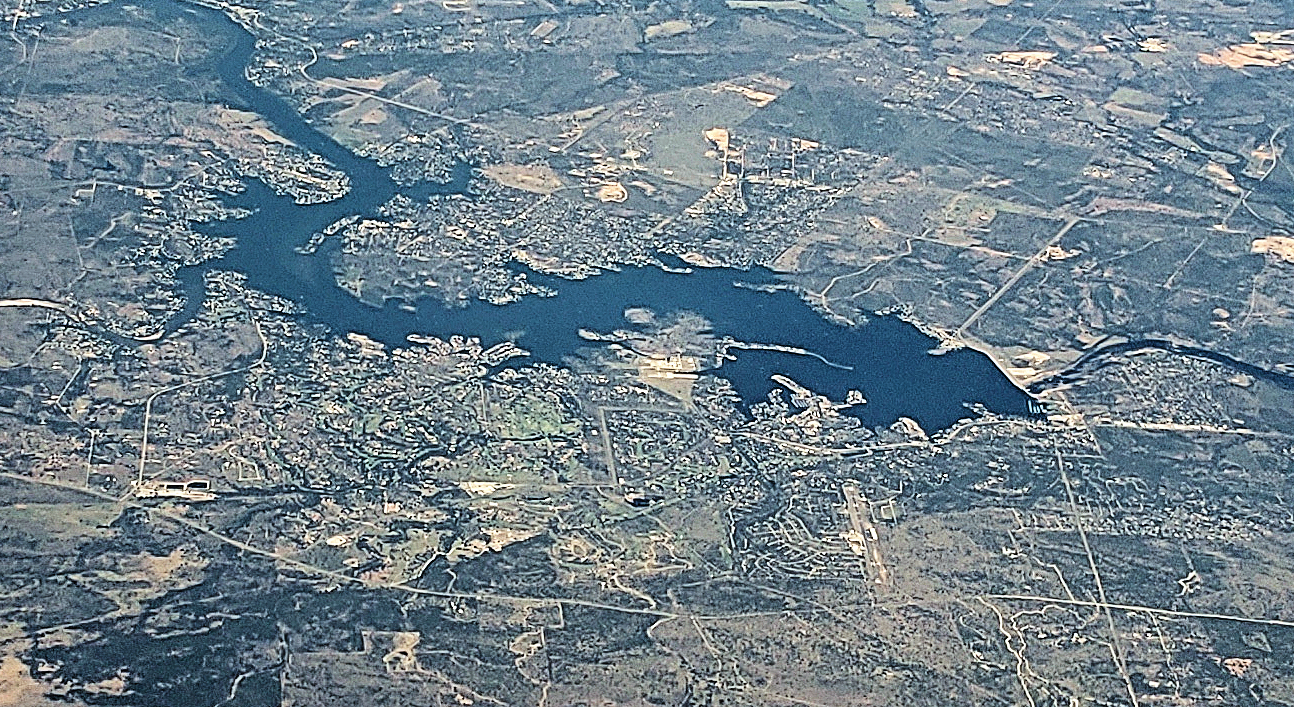
Horseshoe Bay on the near shore of Lake Lyndon B. Johnson.

Horseshoe Bay is located primarily in Llano County and extends eastward into Burnet County, on the southern shore of Lake Lyndon B. Johnson. It is about 28 miles (45 km) southeast of Llano, about 8 miles (13 km) west of Marble Falls, and 51 miles (82 km) northwest of downtown Austin.

According to the United States Census Bureau, the city has a total area of 11.6 square miles (30.1 km^{2}), of which 11.4 square miles (29.5 km^{2}) is land and 0.23 square miles (0.6 km^{2}), or 1.83%, is water.

=== Climate ===
The climate in this area is characterized by hot, humid summers and generally mild to cool winters. According to the Köppen Climate Classification system, Horseshoe Bay has a humid subtropical climate, abbreviated "Cfa" on climate maps.

== Demographics ==
Horseshoe Bay first appeared as a census-designated place in the 1990 U.S. census, and was incorporated in 2006.

Historical population
| Census | Pop. | Note | %± |
|---|---|---|---|
| 1990 | 1,546 | | — |
| 2000 | 3,337 | | 115.8% |
| 2010 | 3,418 | | 2.4% |
| 2020 | 4,257 | | 24.5% |
| 2025 (est.) | 5,339 | | 25.4% |
1990 2000; 2010

=== 2020 census ===
As of the 2020 census, there were 4,257 people, 2,114 households, and 1,309 families residing in the city. The median age was 64.0 years; 9.5% of residents were under the age of 18 and 47.5% of residents were 65 years of age or older. For every 100 females there were 92.8 males, and for every 100 females age 18 and over there were 92.0 males age 18 and over.

85.8% of residents lived in urban areas, while 14.2% lived in rural areas.

There were 2,114 households in Horseshoe Bay, of which 12.2% had children under the age of 18 living in them. Of all households, 60.5% were married-couple households, 14.2% were households with a male householder and no spouse or partner present, and 21.5% were households with a female householder and no spouse or partner present. About 26.3% of all households were made up of individuals and 17.8% had someone living alone who was 65 years of age or older.

There were 3,568 housing units, of which 40.8% were vacant. The homeowner vacancy rate was 4.8% and the rental vacancy rate was 21.6%.

The racial composition of Horseshoe Bay as reported by the 2020 census is shown below.

Racial composition as of the 2020 census
| Race | Number | Percent |
|---|---|---|
| White | 3,797 | 89.2% |
| Black or African American | 20 | 0.5% |
| American Indian and Alaska Native | 38 | 0.9% |
| Asian | 32 | 0.8% |
| Native Hawaiian and Other Pacific Islander | 0 | 0.0% |
| Some other race | 107 | 2.5% |
| Two or more races | 263 | 6.2% |
| Hispanic or Latino (of any race) | 462 | 10.9% |

=== 2000 census ===
As of the census of 2000, there were 3,337 people, 1,623 households, and 1,186 families residing in the CDP. The population density was 142.8 inhabitants per square mile (55.1/km^{2}). There were 2,773 housing units at an average density of 118.7 units per square mile (45.8 units/km^{2}). The racial makeup of the CDP was 96.22% White, 0.33% African American, 0.24% Native American, 0.78% Asian, 1.47% from other races, and 0.96% from two or more races. Hispanic or Latino of any race were 4.29% of the population.

There were 1,623 households, out of which 11.6% had children under the age of 18 living with them, 68.5% were married couples living together, 2.8% had a female householder with no husband present, and 26.9% were non-families. 24.0% of all households were made up of individuals, and 12.1% had someone living alone who was 65 years of age or older. The average household size was 2.06 and the average family size was 2.37.

In the CDP, the population was spread out, with 10.6% under the age of 18, 3.4% from 18 to 24, 15.0% from 25 to 44, 36.2% from 45 to 64, and 34.8% who were 65 years of age or older. The median age was 58 years. For every 100 females, there were 95.7 males. For every 100 females age 18 and over, there were 95.7 males.

The median income for a household in the CDP was $54,073, and the median income for a family was $65,324. Males had a median income of $39,375 versus $23,019 for females. The per capita income for the CDP was $36,254. About 5.8% of families and 6.1% of the population were below the poverty line, including 9.2% of those under age 18 and 4.7% of those age 65 or over.

== Education ==
The Llano County portion of Horseshoe Bay is served by the Llano Independent School District. The Burnet County portion is served by the Marble Falls Independent School District. As of August 2024, no public or private schools are located within the city limits of Horseshoe Bay, TX.

== Notable residents ==
- Chuck Woolery, game show host
- Jim Lovell, astronaut
