= Holly Street Power Plant =

Structure in Austin, Texas, U.S.

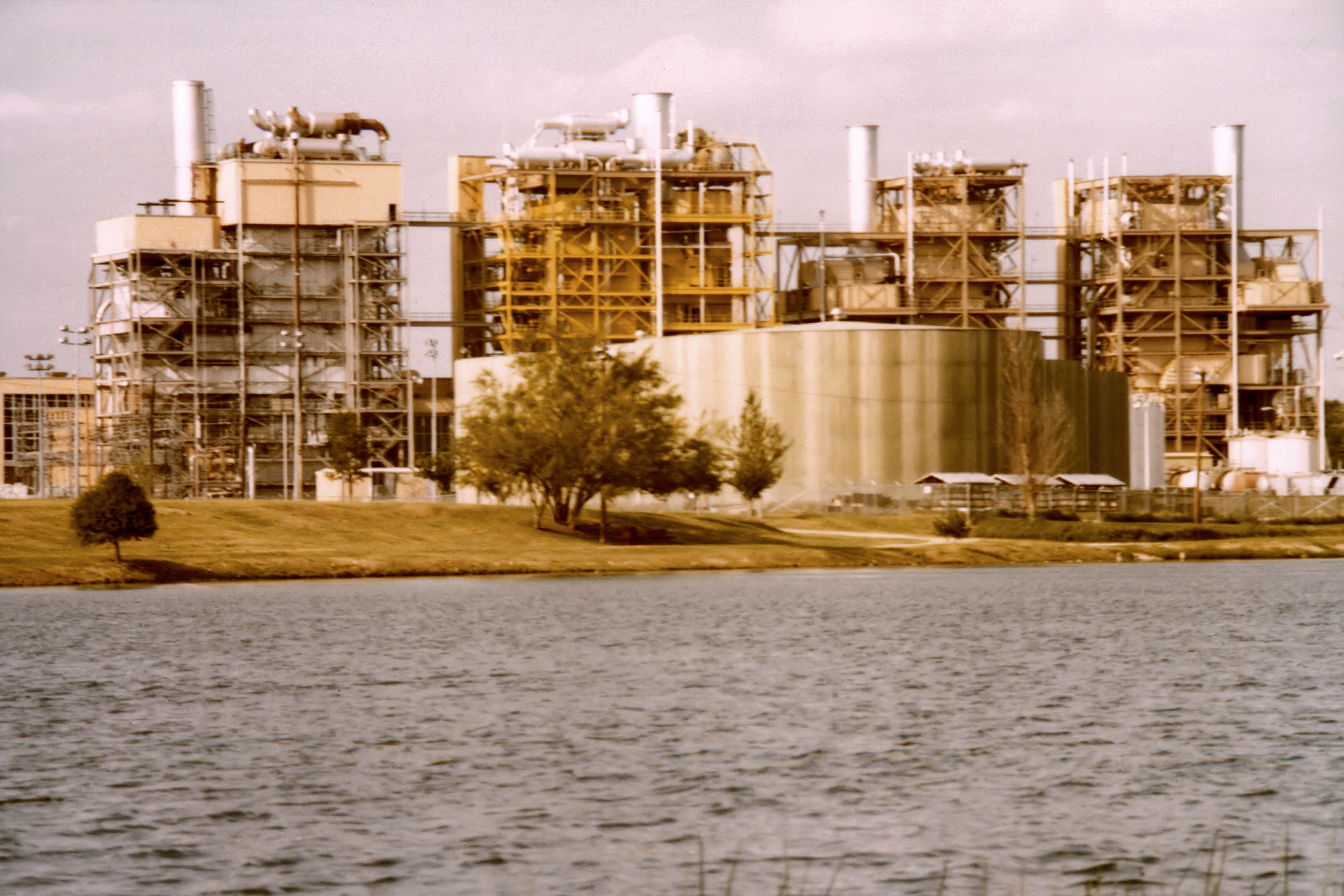
- The Holly Street Power Plant c. 1980

General information
- Type: Power Plant
- Architectural style: Construction
- Location: 2298 Riverview St., Austin, Texas, U.S.
- Coordinates: 30°15′02.1″N 97°43′11.5″W
- Elevation: 129 m
- Groundbreaking: 1958
- Inaugurated: 1960
- Closed: September 30, 2007
- Demolished: October 22, 2011
- Owner: Austin Energy

Design and construction
- Architect: J. M. Odom Construction Company

The Holly Street Power Plant was initially constructed in 1958 to serve the growing Austin Community. This electric power plant ran off natural gas and petroleum. It was constructed from 1958 till 1974, but began to produce electricity in 1960. The Holly Street Power Plant operated for 47 years until it was decommissioned in 2007 due to citizen complaints over the chemical spills that took place in 1974, 1991, and 1992 and the noise pollution the plant created.

== Decommission and destruction ==
The plant closed on September 30, 2007. After years of alleged environmental pollution seeping out into nearby neighborhoods as well as the local Town Lake, environmental justice groups fought with the city to demolish the plant. They argued that cancer rates had increased and that the noise from the plant far exceeded normal living thresholds. The plant ceased providing power for nearby residents in 2007, but would not see the actual demolition start until 2011. Companies were sought by the City of Austin to provide the destruction. This would lead to a halt in progress as the city could not reach agreements with multiple companies on payment. Decommissioning of the plant was still in progress in late 2017 when it entered the final stage of decommission: the physical building was gone but many tests to still had to be run before it was fully decommissioned and turned over to the City of Austin Parks and Recreation Department.
