= Lake Marble Falls =

Hydroelectric reservoir near Marble Falls, Texas

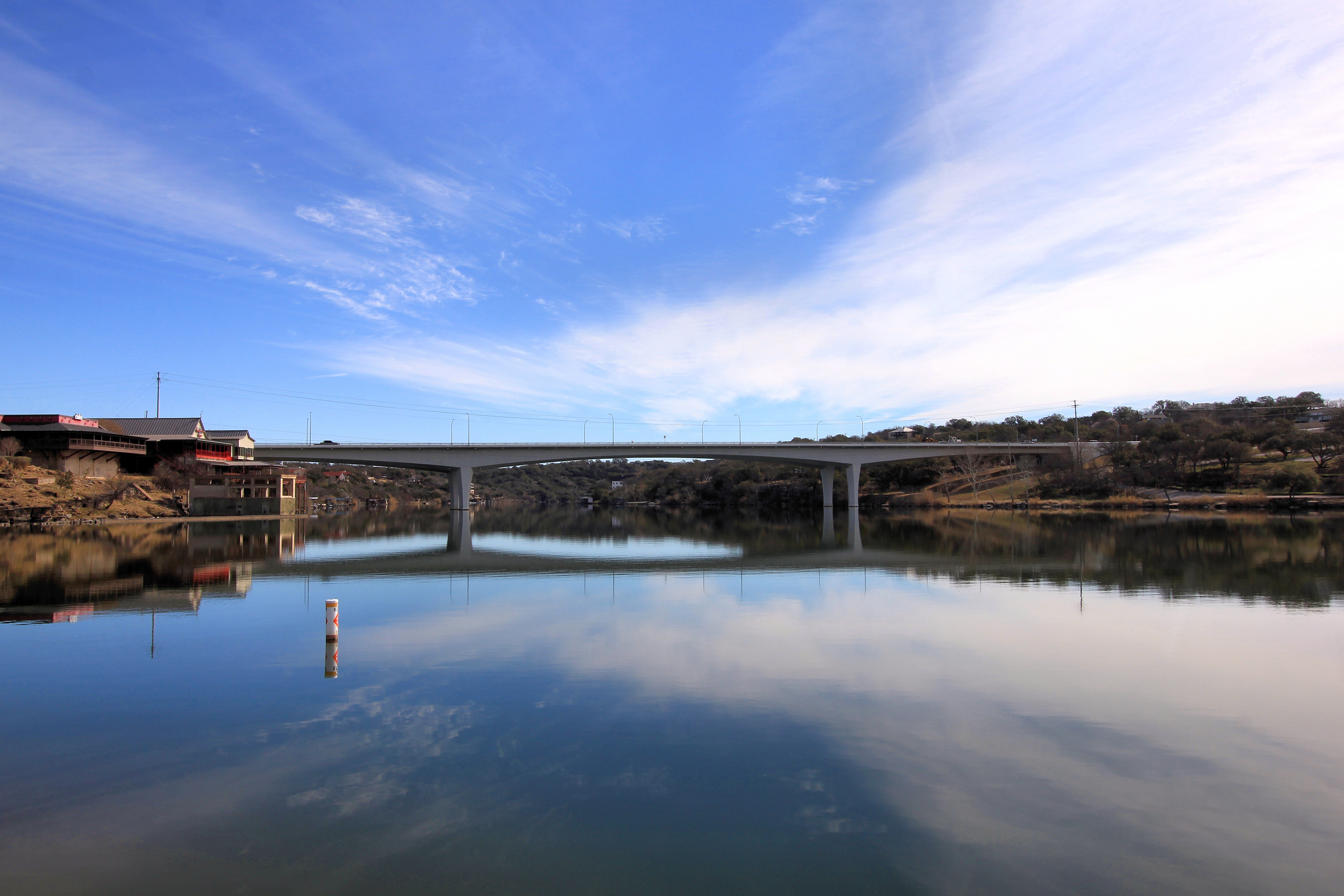
- Lake Marble Falls from Marble Falls, Texas

- Location within Texas Location within the United States
- Location: Burnet County, near the town of Marble Falls, Texas
- Coordinates: 30°33.40′N 98°15.38′W
- Lake type: Hydroelectric reservoir
- Primary inflows: Colorado River
- Primary outflows: Colorado River
- Basin countries: United States
- Surface area: 611 acres (247 ha)
- Max. depth: 60 ft (18 m)
- Surface elevation: 738 ft (225 m)

Lake Marble Falls is a reservoir on the Colorado River in the Texas Hill Country in the United States. The reservoir was formed in 1951 by the construction of Max Starcke Dam by the Lower Colorado River Authority. Originally named Marble Falls Dam, the dam was renamed in 1962 for Max Starcke, the second general director of the LCRA. Located near the city of Marble Falls, the lake is used as a venue for aquatic recreation and for the purpose of generating hydroelectric power. It is the newest and smallest of the Texas Highland Lakes.

The other reservoirs on the Colorado River are Lake Buchanan, Inks Lake, Lake LBJ, Lake Travis, Lake Austin, and Lady Bird Lake.

== Fish and wildlife populations ==
Unlike some of its immediate neighbors in the Texas Highland Lakes reservoir system, Lake Marble Falls is not infested with hydrilla, a non-native invasive plant from Asia thought to have been introduced to the U.S. via the tropical fish industry. Lake Marble Falls has been stocked with several species of native fish intended to improve the utility of the reservoir for recreational fishing. Fish present in Inks Lake include largemouth bass, catfish, and sunfish. Lake Marble Falls boasts being in the "top 50" as far as Record Stripers Striped Bass in the Texas freshwater fish records. http://www.tpwd.state.tx.us/fishboat/fish/programs/fishrecords/freshwater/top50_striped.phtml

=== Invasive Species ===
Zebra mussels are an invasive species that are able to attach themselves to boats and can be spread through anthropogenic sources. Lake Marble Falls is one of two lakes in the San Gabriel River Basin that is found to have this infestation.

== Recreational uses ==
Most of the property bordering Lake Marble Falls is privately owned. Fishing and boating are popular recreational activities, including the annual Lake Marble Falls Lakefest drag boat races.
