= Mansfield Dam =

Dam on the Colorado River near Austin, Texas, United States

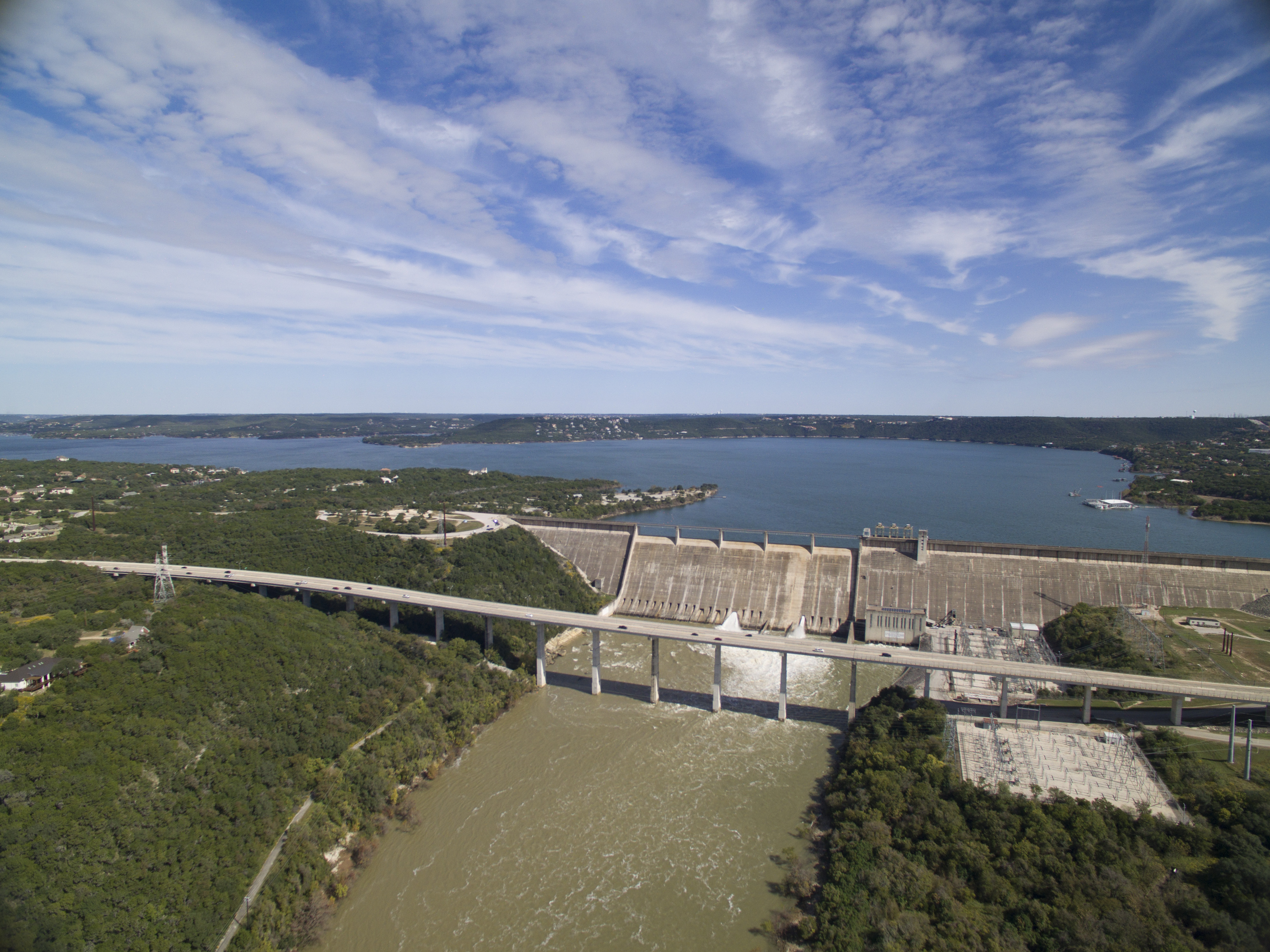
- Mansfield Dam, November 2018
- Interactive map of Mansfield Dam
- Official name: Mansfield Dam
- Location: Travis County, Texas, USA
- Coordinates: 30°23′32″N 97°54′26″W
- Construction began: 1937
- Opening date: 1941
- Operator: Lower Colorado River Authority

Dam and spillways
- Impounds: Colorado River
- Height: 278 feet (85 m)
- Length: 7,089 feet (2,161 m)
- Width (base): 213 feet (65 m)
- Spillway type: 24 controlled (paradox and jet-flow gates)
- Spillway capacity: 130,000 cu ft/s (3,700 m^{3}/s) (23 floodgates at 5,250 cfs; 1 variable discharge gate at 2,285 cfs 2 turbines at 4,100 cfs, 1 turbine at 2,400 cfs)

Reservoir
- Creates: Lake Travis

Power Station
- Installed capacity: 108 MW

Mansfield Dam (formerly Marshall Ford Dam) is a dam located across a canyon at Marshall Ford on the Colorado River, 13 miles (21 km) northwest of Austin, Texas, United States. The groundbreaking ceremony occurred on February 19, 1937, with United States Secretary of the Interior Harold L. Ickes attending. The dam was a joint project by the Lower Colorado River Authority (LCRA) and the United States Bureau of Reclamation, with partial funding provided by the Public Works Administration. Brown and Root, headed by James E. Walters Sr., was the prime contractor. The dam was completed in 1941. Originally called Marshall Ford Dam, the name was changed in 1941 in honor of United States Representative J.J. Mansfield. The reservoir behind Mansfield Dam is named Lake Travis. The dam is owned and operated by the LCRA.

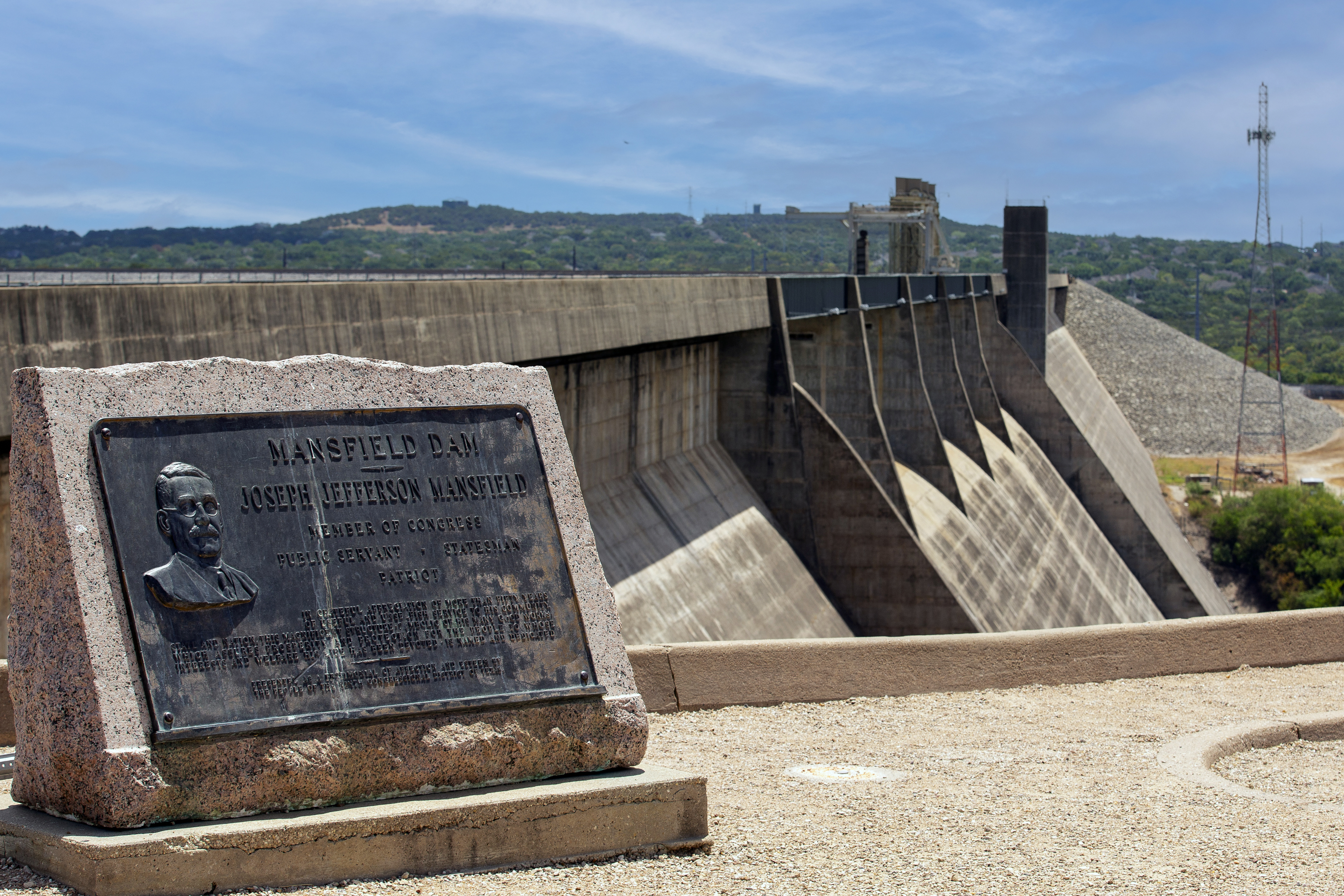
The dedication at Mansfield Dam, August 2023

Mansfield Dam is 278 feet (85 m) high, 7,089 feet (2 km) long, and 213 feet (65 m) thick at the base. The concrete gravity dam with embankment wings and saddle dikes was designed to control flooding; to store 1.4 km^{3} (369 billion US gallons) of water; and to generate hydroelectric power (108 megawatts). The Spillway Elevation is 714 feet (218 m) above Mean Sea Level (MSL). LCRA begins to open floods gates when water reaches 681 feet above MSL. At 681 feet (208 m) above MSL, discharge capacity exceeds 130,000 cubic feet per second (3,700 m^{3}/s) as the lake rises.

The two lanes of Mansfield Dam Road, formerly RM 620, traverse the top of the dam, but traffic other than service vehicles are now prohibited. 620 was rerouted in 1995 to a four-lane highway bridge on the downstream side of the dam built for increase in traffic due to the popularity in Austin of recreating at Lake Travis.

== Political History ==
Lyndon B. Johnson ran for his first elected office as United States Representative for Texas's 10th congressional district (where the Mansfield Dam was located). His campaign was backed by the dam's contractors, and his success in clearing funding and regulatory hurdles for the dam shortly after his election is considered a cornerstone of his future political career.

== See also ==
- List of dams and reservoirs in Texas
