= Lake Travis (disambiguation) =

Lake Travis can refer to the lake located west of Austin or the communities that border its lake.

== Places named after Lake Travis ==
- Lake Travis, a lake located west of Austin
- Lake Travis High School, a Central Texas high school
- Lake Travis Independent School District, a Texas school district
