= Briarcliff, Texas =

- Village
- Interactive map of Briarcliff, Texas
- Coordinates: 30°24′32″N 98°02′43″W
- Country: United States
- State: Texas
- County: Travis

Area
  - Total: 1.73 sq mi (4.49 km^{2})
  - Land: 1.65 sq mi (4.27 km^{2})
  - Water: 0.089 sq mi (0.23 km^{2})
- Elevation: 758 ft (231 m)

Population (2020)
  - Total: 2,062
  - Density: 1,251/sq mi (483.1/km^{2})
- Time zone: UTC-6 (Central (CST))
  - Summer (DST): UTC-5 (CDT)
- ZIP code: 78669
- Area code: 512
- FIPS code: 48-10197
- GNIS feature ID: 2413535
- Website: www.briarclifftx.com

Briarcliff is a village in Travis County, Texas, United States. The population was 2,062 at the 2020 census.

== Geography ==
Briarcliff is located about 30 miles west of Austin]. Briarcliff is 6.28 miles outside the western city limit of Lakeway.

According to the United States Census Bureau, the village has a total area of 1.5 square miles (3.8 km^{2}), of which 1.4 square miles (3.6 km^{2}) is land and 0.1 square mile (0.2 km^{2}) (5.48%) is water.

Water accessibility by marina to Cat Hollow off the main basin of Lake Travis is at mile marker 26.

== Demographics ==
Historical population
Census	Pop.	Note	%±
1990	335		—
2000	895		167.2%
2010	1,438		60.7%
2020	2,062		43.4%
U.S. Decennial Census

As of the census of 2000, there were 895 people, 369 households, and 260 families residing in the village. The population density was 647.0 inhabitants per square mile (249.8/km^{2}). There were 455 housing units at an average density of 328.9 per square mile (127.0/km^{2}). The racial makeup of the village was 95.31% White, 0.45% African American, 0.11% Native American, 0.45% Asian, 2.23% from other races, and 1.45% from two or more races. Hispanic or Latino of any race were 7.37% of the population.

There were 369 households, out of which 30.9% had children under the age of 18 living with them, 61.8% were married couples living together, 6.5% had a female householder with no husband present, and 29.3% were non-families. 22.5% of all households were made up of individuals, and 6.2% had someone living alone who was 65 years of age or older. The average household size was 2.43 and the average family size was 2.86.

In the village, the population was spread out, with 22.8% under the age of 18, 4.8% from 18 to 24, 32.0% from 25 to 44, 31.6% from 45 to 64, and 8.8% who were 65 years of age or older. The median age was 41 years. For every 100 females, there were 104.3 males. For every 100 females age 18 and over, there were 100.3 males.

The median income for a household in the village was $76,453, and the median income for a family was $82,507. Males had a median income of $50,000 versus $33,906 for females. The per capita income for the village was $32,650. About 0.7% of families and 3.5% of the population were below the poverty line, including 4.0% of those under age 18 and none of those age 65 or over.

== Education ==
The Village of Briarcliff is served by the Lake Travis Independent School District. Residents are zoned to West Cypress Hills Elementary School in an unincorporated area, Lake Travis Middle School in an unincorporated area, and Lake Travis High School, in an unincorporated area.

Previously, residents were zoned to Bee Cave Elementary School in Bee Cave.
