= 1979 WCT Tournament of Champions – Singles =

Singles
- 1979 WCT Tournament of Champions

Final
- Champion: (United States) Jimmy Connors
- Runner-up: (United States) Vitas Gerulaitis
- Score: 6–5, 6–0, 6–4

Details
- Draw: 6
← 1978 ·	WCT Tournament of Champions	· 1980 →

Björn Borg was the defending champion, but did not compete this year.

Jimmy Connors won the title by defeating Vitas Gerulaitis 6–5, 6–0, 6–4 in the final.

Connors did not lose a single match in the entire tournament, despite being played in a round-robin system.

== Draw ==
=== Final ===
Final
(United States) Jimmy Connors	6	6	6
(United States) Vitas Gerulaitis	5	0	4

=== Round-robin ===
		Connors	Fleming	Gerulaitis	Năstase	Orantes	Panatta	RR W–L	Set W–L	Game W–L	Standings
(United States)	Jimmy Connors		6–5, 6–0	6–0, 6–4	6–4, 6–5	6–3, 6–1	4–6, 6–5, 6–2	5–0	10–1	64–35	1
(United States)	Peter Fleming	5–6, 0–6		1–6, 3–6	6–5, 6–3	6–1, 6–2	6–3, 2–6, 6–4	3–2	6–5	47–48	3
(United States)	Vitas Gerulaitis	4–6, 0–6	6–1, 6–3		6–3, 6–2	6–2, 6–2	6–2, 6–5	4–1	8–2	52–32	2
(Romania)	Ilie Năstase	4–6, 5–6	5–6, 3–6	3–6, 2–6		6–4, 6–4	6–4, 2–6, 6–1	2–3	4–7	48–55	4
(Spain)	Manuel Orantes	1–6, 3–6	1–6, 2–6	2–6, 2–6	4–6, 4–6		3–6, 4–6	0–5	0–10	26–60	6
(Italy)	Adriano Panatta	6–4, 5–6, 2–6	3–6, 6–2, 4–6	2–6, 5–6	4–6, 6–2, 1–6	6–3, 6–4		1–4	5–8	56–63	5
