= Hilah Johnson =

American actress

- Born: Hudson Bend, Texas, US
- Education: University of Texas (BS)
- Occupations: Webseries host, author
- Known for: Hilah Cooking
- Board member of: GiveBackLA
- Website: hilahcooking.com

Hilah Johnson is an American chef, Internet personality and author from Austin, Texas. She is best known for her YouTube series Hilah Cooking.

== Early life ==
Johnson grew up in Hudson Bend, Texas, a suburb of Austin near Lake Travis. Her father was descended from Austin's famed Old Three Hundred, and her mother's ancestors included those who helped build the Republic of Texas (1836–45). When Johnson was seven, she started cooking, occasionally making dishes for herself, her parents, and her brother.

Upon reaching adulthood, she attended the University of Massachusetts Boston (UMass Boston), where she studied Biology. After a year at UMass Boston, she transferred to the University of Texas in Austin, where she finished with a degree in Botany. After college, she was part of a rock band called The Hot As Shits, and she also joined an improv troupe in Austin called Big ol’ Tire Fire. There, she met a burgeoning filmmaker named Christopher Sharpe.

Over the next few years, Johnson and Sharpe began collaborating on several projects. They worked together on the short film Freerange Asshole; she had an acting role and served as costume designer, while he worked behind the scenes as a sound mixer. They also worked together on an indie horror flick, which he directed and in which she starred, though the film was never finished. In 2010, they decided to focus on producing web content.

== Hilah Cooking ==
Johnson stars in and is co-producer (along with Sharpe) of the YouTube series Hilah Cooking. On the show, she guides viewers through the steps of cooking various homemade dishes, using humor along the way. The show premiered in January 2010, and by 2012, the show was so successful that she was able to quit her day job as a dental hygienist.

In 2011, the show had approximately two thousand subscribers. Two years later, it had increased to 100,000, and by 2015, that number was nearly 250,000.

== Other work ==
The success of Hilah Cooking led to a spin-off series, Hilah's Texas Kitchen, seen on Tastemade. On this show, Johnson traveled to eateries throughout the state of Texas to sample various Texas cuisine, as prepared by expert chefs. She then shows viewers an easy way to prepare these dishes themselves.

In addition to her online shows, Johnson has also written five books on cooking. In 2017, she debuted a new podcast, Hilah's Happy Hour.

== Awards and competitions ==
In 2011, Johnson won the YouTube Next Chef competition. In 2017, she was featured in the Star Power tournament on the 33rd season of Food Network's Chopped. She finished third on the semi-final episode featuring Internet stars.

== Personal life ==
In 2011, Johnson married her long-time collaborator Sharpe. In October 2014, they welcomed the arrival of their son Flint. The three of them moved to Los Angeles in 2015. Together, Johnson and Sharpe serve on the board of the charitable organization GiveBackLA, where they are in charge of social media.

== Publications ==
- Learn to Cook; Hilah Cooking, 2nd edition (2012) [original publication 2011], ISBN 978-0-9886736-0-1
- The Breakfast Taco Book; Hilah Cooking, 2nd edition (2013) [original publication 2011], ISBN 978-0-9886736-2-5
- Cavelady Cooking; Hilah Cooking (2012), ASIN B007ZT2LN8
- Holiday Cookies; Hilah Cooking (2012), ISBN 978-0-98867364-9
- Slow Cooker Recipes; Hilah Cooking (2014), ASIN B00NBA6BVS
