= 1977 WCT Tournament of Champions – Singles =

Singles
- 1977 WCT Tournament of Champions

Final
- Champion: (United States) Harold Solomon
- Runner-up: (Australia) Ken Rosewall
- Score: 6–5^{(7–5)}, 6–2, 2–6, 0–6, 6–3

Details
- Draw: 16
WCT Tournament of Champions	· 1978 →

In the inaugural edition of the tournament, Harold Solomon won the title by defeating Ken Rosewall 6–5^{(7–5)}, 6–2, 2–6, 0–6, 6–3 in the final.

The tournament was played in three stages. The preliminary draw was played at the World of Tennis Resort in Lakeway, Texas, with the top half being played in March and the bottom half being played in July. The final match was played at the Madison Square Garden in New York City, New York. The final was played with so-called television rules: no-ad scoring (first player to reach four points wins the game) and tiebreaks at 5-all.

== Draw ==
=== Final (September) ===
Final
Madison Square Garden, New York City
(United States) Harold Solomon	6	6	2	0	6
(Australia) Ken Rosewall	5	2	6	6	3

=== Top half (March) ===
First round
(Romania) Ilie Năstase	6	6
(United States) Bill Scanlon	1	1
(Australia) Ken Rosewall	1	6	6
(Poland) Wojciech Fibak	6	3	3
(United States) Eddie Dibbs	3	6	6
(South Africa) Cliff Drysdale	6	5	2
(India) Vijay Amritraj	2	6	6
(Italy) Adriano Panatta	6	3	3

Second round
(Romania) Ilie Năstase	3	3
(Australia) Ken Rosewall	6	6
(United States) Eddie Dibbs	6	6
(India) Vijay Amritraj	5	3

Semifinal
(Australia) Ken Rosewall	6	6
(United States) Eddie Dibbs	2	2

=== Bottom half (July) ===
First round
(United States) Dick Stockton	6	6
(Australia) John Alexander	4	4
(United States) Jimmy Connors	2	6	6
(United States) Cliff Richey	6	1	1
(Australia) Phil Dent	6	5	6
(New Zealand) Onny Parun	5	6	4
(United States) Harold Solomon	6	6
(United Kingdom) Mark Cox	3	3

Second round
(United States) Dick Stockton	w/o
(United States) Jimmy Connors
(Australia) Phil Dent	6	0	2
(United States) Harold Solomon	4	6	6

Semifinal
(United States) Dick Stockton	4	4
(United States) Harold Solomon	6	6
