= 1982 WCT Tournament of Champions =

- Date: May 2–9
- Edition: 6th
- Category: World Championship Tennis
- Draw: 61S / 28D
- Prize money: $300,000
- Surface: Clay / outdoor
- Location: Forest Hills, Queens, New York, United States
- Venue: West Side Tennis Club

Champions

Singles
- (Czechoslovakia) Ivan Lendl

Doubles
- (United States) Tracy Delatte / (United States) Johan Kriek
← 1981 ·	WCT Tournament of Champions	· 1983 →

The 1982 WCT Tournament of Champions was a men's tennis tournament played on outdoor clay courts at the West Side Tennis Club in Forest Hills, Queens, New York City in the United States and part of the 1982 World Championship Tennis circuit. It was the sixth edition of the tournament and was held from May 2 through May 9, 1982.

== Finals ==
=== Singles ===
(Czechoslovakia) Ivan Lendl defeated (United States) Eddie Dibbs 6–1, 6–1

- It was Lendl's 8th singles title of the year and the 25th of his career.

=== Doubles ===
(United States) Tracy Delatte / (United States) Johan Kriek defeated (United States) Dick Stockton / (United States) Erik van Dillen 6–4, 3–6, 6–3
