= 1979 WCT Tournament of Champions =

- Date: February 19 – 25
- Edition: 3rd
- Category: WCT
- Draw: 6S (round robin)
- Prize money: $200,000
- Surface: Hard / outdoor
- Location: Dorado, Puerto Rico
- Venue: Cerrormar Beach Hotel

Champions

Singles
- (United States) Jimmy Connors
← 1978 ·	WCT Tournament of Champions	· 1980 →

The 1979 WCT Tournament of Champions was a men's tennis tournament played on outdoor hard courts at the Cerromar Beach Hotel in Dorado, Puerto Rico. It was a six men round-robin tournament followed by a final between the two best performing players. The event was part of the 1979 World Championship Tennis (WCT) tour, which in turn was part of the 1979 Grand Prix circuit, but was classified as a special event and as such did not count towards the Grand Prix rankings. It was the third edition of the tournament and was held from February 19 through February 25, 1979. Jimmy Connors won the singles title and the accompanying $100,000 first prize money.

== Finals ==
=== Singles ===
(United States) Jimmy Connors defeated (United States) Vitas Gerulaitis 6–5, 6–0, 6–4
