= 1981 WCT Tournament of Champions =

- Date: May 4–10
- Edition: 5th
- Category: Grand Prix (WCT)
- Draw: 64S / 32D
- Prize money: $592,000
- Surface: Clay / outdoor
- Location: Forest Hills, Queens, New York, United States
- Venue: West Side Tennis Club

Champions

Singles
- (United States) Eddie Dibbs

Doubles
- (United States) Peter Fleming / (United States) John McEnroe
← 1980 ·	WCT Tournament of Champions	· 1982 →

The 1981 WCT Tournament of Champions was a men's tennis tournament played on outdoor clay courts at the West Side Tennis Club in Forest Hills, Queens, New York City in the United States and part of the 1981 Grand Prix circuit. It was the fifth edition of the tournament and was held from May 4 through May 10, 1981. The event was open to players who had won a tournament worth at least $25,000 during the previous 12 months. Tenth-seeded Eddie Dibbs won the singles title and the accompanying first prize of $100,000 plus $3,050 in bonus money.

== Finals ==
=== Singles ===
(United States) Eddie Dibbs defeated (Brazil) Carlos Kirmayr 6–3, 6–2

- It was Dibbs' 1st singles title of the year and the 21st of his career.

=== Doubles ===
(United States) Peter Fleming / (United States) John McEnroe defeated (Australia) John Fitzgerald / (United States) Andy Kohlberg 6–4, 6–4
