= 1978 WCT Tournament of Champions =

- Date: March 20–26
- Edition: 2nd
- Category: WCT
- Draw: 16S
- Prize money: $200,000
- Surface: Carpet / outdoor
- Location: Las Vegas, US
- Venue: Las Vegas Hilton

Champions

Singles
- (Sweden) Björn Borg
← 1977 ·	WCT Tournament of Champions	· 1979 →

The 1978 WCT Tournament of Champions, also known by its sponsored name Shakey's Tournament of Champions, was a men's tennis tournament played on outdoor carpet courts at the Las Vegas Hilton in Las Vegas in the United States. The event was part of the 1978 World Championship Tennis (WCT) tour, which in turn was part of the 1978 Grand Prix circuit, but was classified as a special event and as such did not count towards the Grand Prix rankings. It was the second edition of the tournament and was held from March 20 through March 26, 1978. Björn Borg won the singles title and the accompanying $60,000 first prize money.

== Finals ==
=== Singles ===
(Sweden) Björn Borg defeated (United States) Vitas Gerulaitis 6–5, 5–6, 6–4, 6–5

- It was Borg's 3rd singles title of the year and the 33rd of his career.
