= Hudson Bend, Texas =

- CDP
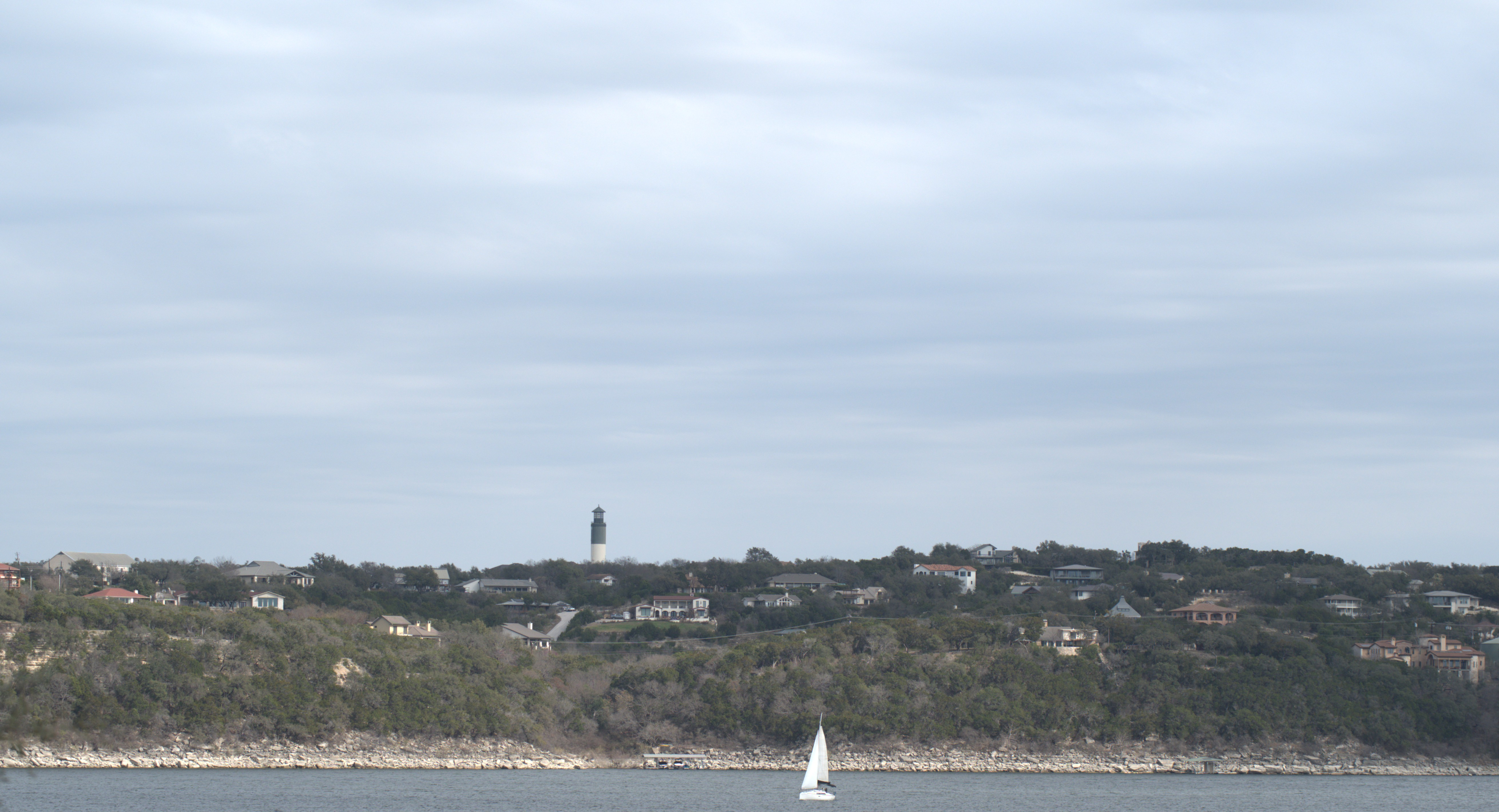
- Western Hudson Bend from the shores of Arkansas Bend Park

- Coordinates: 30°24′50″N 97°55′41″W
- Country: United States
- State: Texas
- County: Travis

Area
  - Total: 6.7 sq mi (17.3 km^{2})
  - Land: 4.0 sq mi (10.3 km^{2})
  - Water: 2.7 sq mi (7.0 km^{2})
- Elevation: 771 ft (235 m)

Population (2020)
  - Total: 4,005
  - Density: 1,010/sq mi (389/km^{2})
- Time zone: UTC-6 (Central (CST))
  - Summer (DST): UTC-5 (CDT)
- ZIP code: 78734
- Area code: 512
- FIPS code: 48-35253
- GNIS feature ID: 2408404

Hudson Bend is a census-designated place (CDP) in Travis County, Texas, United States. The population was 4,005 at the 2020 census.

== Geography ==
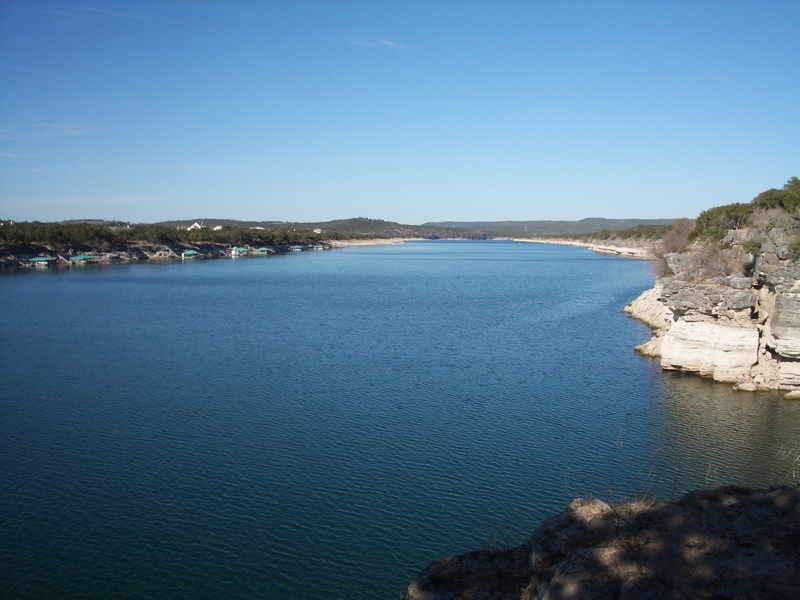
Lake Travis is located near Hudson Bend

Hudson Bend is located 16 miles (26 km) northwest of Austin on Lake Travis.

According to the United States Census Bureau, the CDP has a total area of 6.7 square miles (17.3 km^{2}), of which 4.0 square miles (10.3 km^{2}) is land and 2.7 square miles (7.0 km^{2}) (40.27%) is water.

== Demographics ==
Historical population
Census	Pop.	Note	%±
2000	2,369		—
2010	2,981		25.8%
2020	4,005		34.4%
U.S. Decennial Census; 1850–1900 1910; 1920 1930 1940; 1950 1960 1970; 1980 1990 2000; 2010 2020

Hudson Bend first appeared as a census designated place in the 2000 U.S. census.

=== Racial and ethnic composition ===
Hudson Bend CDP, Texas – Racial and ethnic composition Note: the US Census treats Hispanic/Latino as an ethnic category. This table excludes Latinos from the racial categories and assigns them to a separate category. Hispanics/Latinos may be of any race.
Race / Ethnicity (NH = Non-Hispanic)	Pop 2000	Pop 2010	Pop 2020	% 2000	% 2010	% 2020
White alone (NH)	2,153	2,386	2,689	90.88%	80.04%	67.14%
Black or African American alone (NH)	3	20	80	0.13%	0.67%	2.00%
Native American or Alaska Native alone (NH)	15	8	14	0.63%	0.27%	0.35%
Asian alone (NH)	12	87	200	0.51%	2.92%	4.99%
Native Hawaiian or Pacific Islander alone (NH)	0	5	2	0.00%	0.17%	0.05%
Other race alone (NH)	3	5	13	0.13%	0.17%	0.32%
Mixed race or Multiracial (NH)	23	63	163	0.97%	2.11%	4.07%
Hispanic or Latino (any race)	160	407	844	6.75%	13.65%	21.07%
Total	2,369	2,981	4,005	100.00%	100.00%	100.00%

=== 2020 census ===
As of the 2020 census, Hudson Bend had a population of 4,005. The median age was 47.5 years. 16.1% of residents were under the age of 18 and 20.0% of residents were 65 years of age or older. For every 100 females there were 103.1 males, and for every 100 females age 18 and over there were 103.0 males age 18 and over.

99.1% of residents lived in urban areas, while 0.9% lived in rural areas.

There were 1,846 households in Hudson Bend, of which 21.4% had children under the age of 18 living in them. Of all households, 46.0% were married-couple households, 22.8% were households with a male householder and no spouse or partner present, and 23.6% were households with a female householder and no spouse or partner present. About 32.3% of all households were made up of individuals and 11.0% had someone living alone who was 65 years of age or older.

There were 2,170 housing units, of which 14.9% were vacant. The homeowner vacancy rate was 2.6% and the rental vacancy rate was 11.1%.

=== 2000 census ===
As of the census of 2000, there were 2,369 people, 1,065 households, and 614 families residing in the CDP. The population density was 594.4 inhabitants per square mile (229.5/km^{2}). There were 1,225 housing units at an average density of 307.4 per square mile (118.7/km^{2}). The racial makeup of the CDP was 94.30% White, 0.13% African American, 0.76% Native American, 0.51% Asian, 0.04% Pacific Islander, 3.00% from other races, and 1.27% from two or more races. Hispanic or Latino of any race were 6.75% of the population.

There were 1,065 households, out of which 25.5% had children under the age of 18 living with them, 47.7% were married couples living together, 6.2% had a female householder with no husband present, and 42.3% were non-families. 32.3% of all households were made up of individuals, and 5.1% had someone living alone who was 65 years of age or older. The average household size was 2.22 and the average family size was 2.82.

In the CDP, the population was spread out, with 20.6% under the age of 18, 4.9% from 18 to 24, 33.0% from 25 to 44, 32.0% from 45 to 64, and 9.4% who were 65 years of age or older. The median age was 42 years. For every 100 females, there were 117.3 males. For every 100 females age 18 and over, there were 116.8 males.

The median income for a household in the CDP was $61,406, and the median income for a family was $77,463. Males had a median income of $42,679 versus $34,338 for females. The per capita income for the CDP was $37,560. About 1.5% of families and 3.5% of the population were below the poverty line, including 2.9% of those under age 18 and 1.5% of those age 65 or over.

== Education ==
Hudson Bend is served by the Lake Travis Independent School District (LTISD).

- The zoned elementary school is Lake Travis Elementary School in Lakeway
- The zoned middle school is Hudson Bend Middle School
- All LTISD students are assigned to Lake Travis High School

=== Public library ===
The Lake Travis Community Library (LTCL) in Lakeway serves Hudson Bend. It originally opened in Lake Travis High School in 1985. Area voters approved the creation of the library district serving the library was created in May 2004. Haythem Dawlett donated the land for the library in March 2011, and the library moved into the current location in February 2013.
