= Brett Baty =

American baseball player (born 1999)

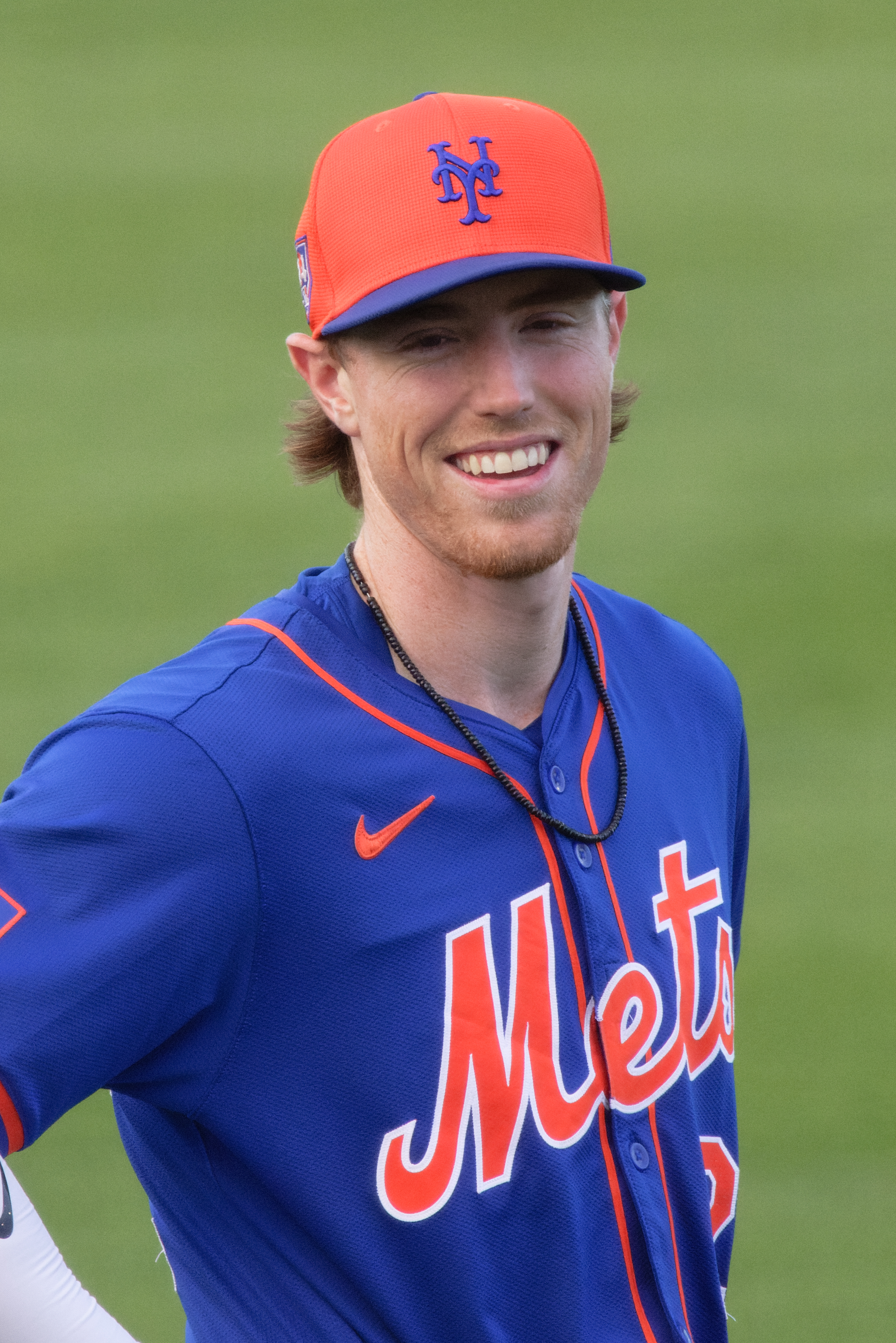
- Baty with the Mets in 2024

New York Mets – No. 7
- Utility player
- Born: November 13, 1999 (age 27); Round Rock, Texas, U.S.
- Bats: Left Throws: Right

MLB debut
- August 17, 2022, for the New York Mets

MLB statistics (through 2026 season)
- Batting average: .234
- Home runs: 44
- Runs batted in: 161
- Stats at Baseball Reference

Teams
- New York Mets (2022–present)

Brett Austin Baty (/ˈbeɪti/ BAIT-ee; born November 13, 1999) is an American professional baseball utility player for the New York Mets of Major League Baseball (MLB). The Mets selected Baty in the first round of the 2019 MLB draft. He made his MLB debut in 2022.

== Early life ==
Baty attended Lake Travis High School in Lakeway, Texas, a suburb of Austin, where he played basketball, baseball, and football. One of Baty's football teammates was Garrett Wilson. As a senior, he batted .615 with 19 home runs and 50 runs batted in (RBIs). He was named the Gatorade Texas Baseball Player of the Year. He committed to play college baseball at the University of Texas.

== Professional career ==
=== Minor leagues ===
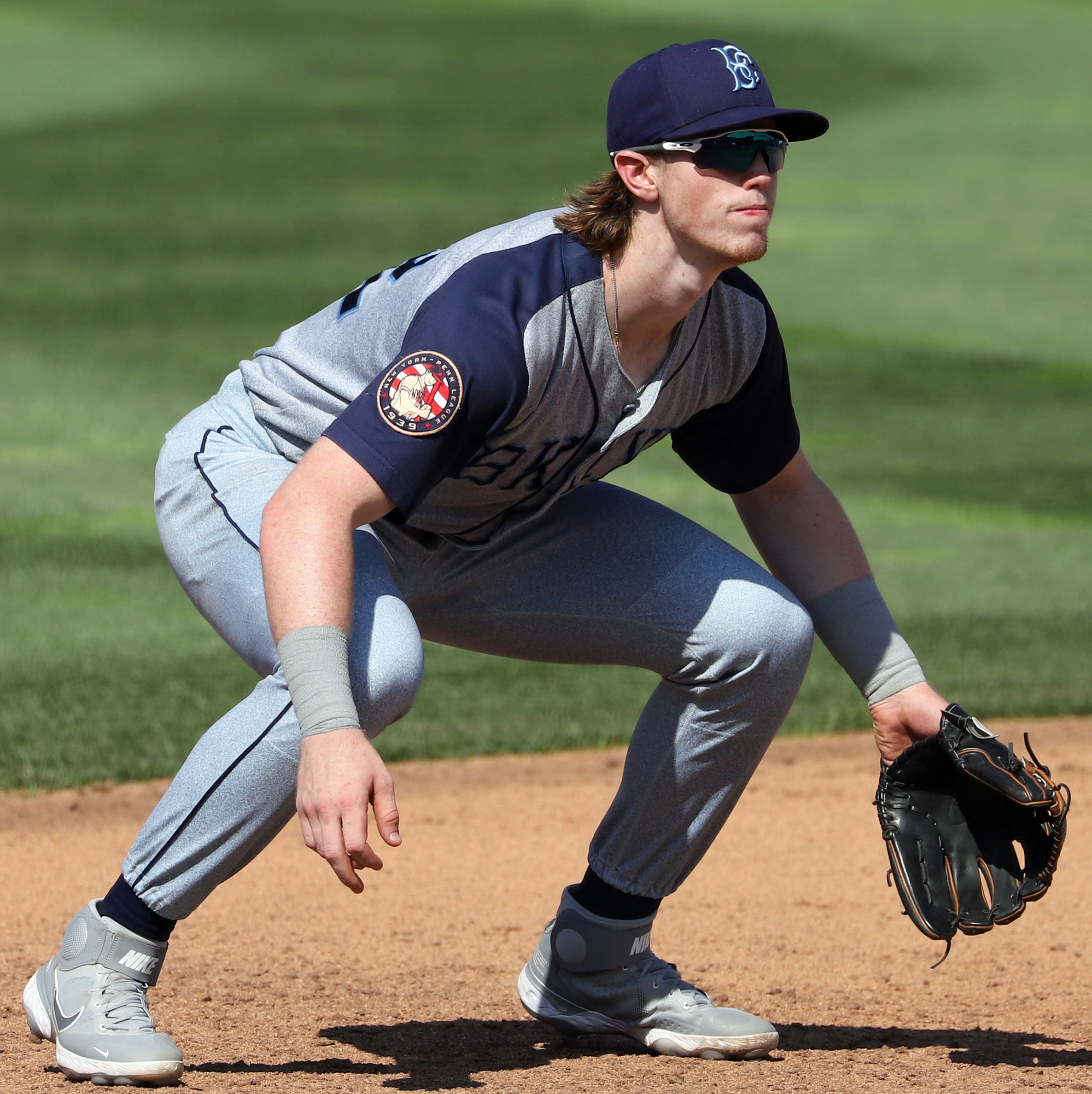
Baty with the Cyclones in 2021

The New York Mets selected Baty in the first round, with the 12th overall selection, of the 2019 Major League Baseball draft. He received a $3.9 million signing bonus from the Mets and was assigned to the Gulf Coast League Mets. After five games, he was promoted to the Kingsport Mets before being promoted to the Brooklyn Cyclones. Over 51 games between the three teams, he batted .234/.368/.452 with 7 home runs and 33 RBIs. Baty did not play in a game in 2020 due to the cancellation of the minor league season because of the COVID-19 pandemic.

Baty returned to Brooklyn to begin the 2021 season. In June, Baty was selected to play in the All-Star Futures Game. Following the game, he was promoted to the Binghamton Rumble Ponies. Over 91 games between the two teams, he slashed .292/.382/.473 with 12 home runs, 56 RBIs, and 22 doubles. Baty began the 2022 season with Binghamton, and was promoted to the Syracuse Mets in August.

=== Major leagues ===
Following injuries to Eduardo Escobar and Luis Guillorme, the Mets promoted Baty to the major leagues on August 17, 2022. He hit a home run in his first major league at-bat on a curveball from Jake Odorizzi. He became only the fifth Mets player to homer in his first career MLB at bat. Baty ended up going 1-for-4 with two RBIs, including a 113 mph groundout that was the hardest hit ball by a Mets left-handed hitter off a lefty pitcher since 2016. On August 31, Baty underwent surgery to repair a torn ligament in his thumb and missed the remainder of the season.

Baty was optioned to Triple-A Syracuse to begin the 2023 season. He was called up to the Majors on April 17 after batting .400 in 35 at bats with Syracuse. On April 27, during a game against the Washington Nationals, Baty went 3-for-3 with two singles, a walk, 3 RBI, and a home run, a 400-foot solo-shot to center. It was his first career 3-hit game. He became the first Mets third baseman age 23 or younger with three hits in a game since Wilmer Flores in 2013. In 108 games for the Mets in 2023, Baty batted .212/.275/.323 with 9 home runs and 34 RBI.

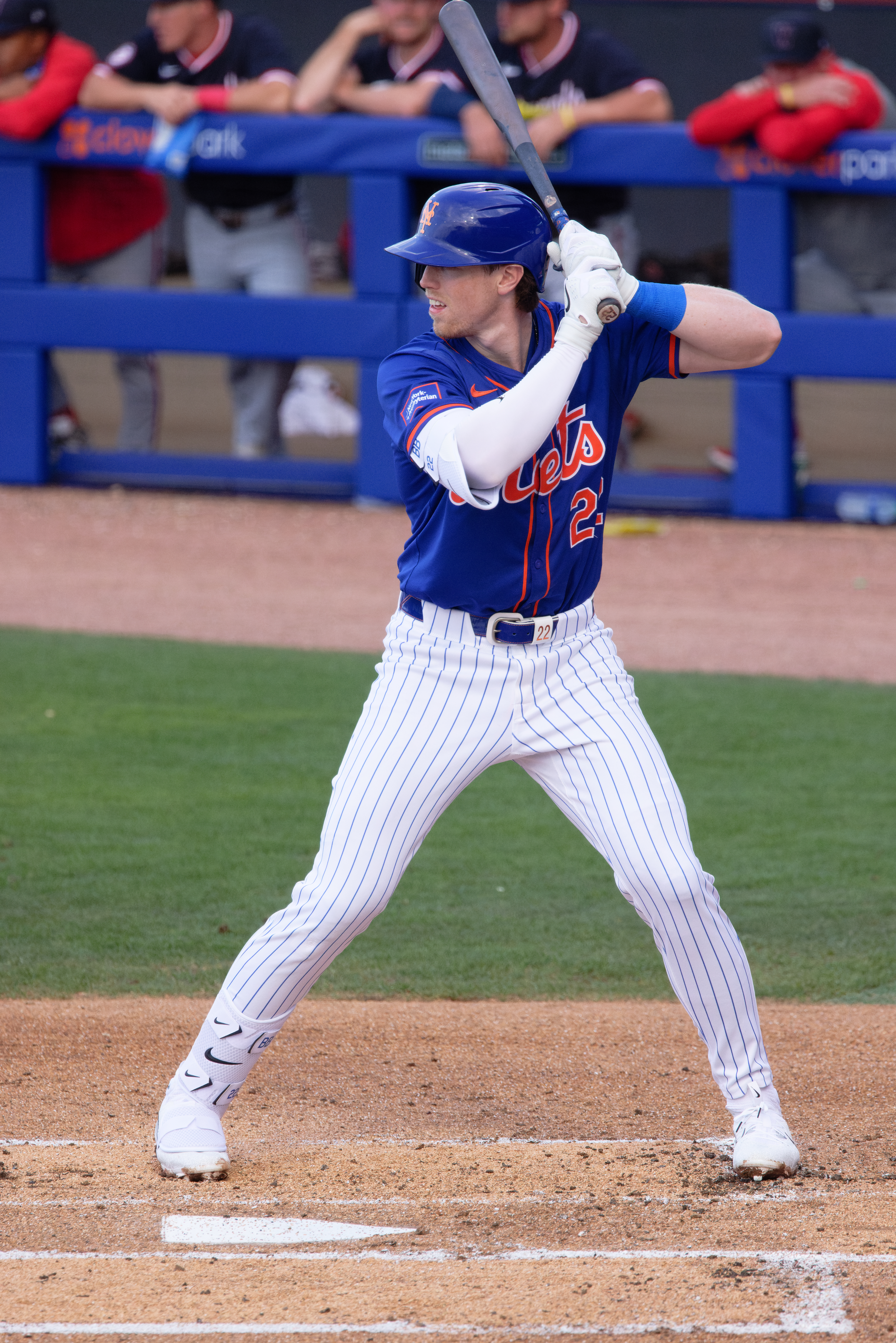
Baty with the Mets in 2024

On May 3, 2024, Baty hit two home runs in a loss against the Tampa Bay Rays, marking the first multi-homer game of his career. He was optioned to Triple-A Syracuse on May 31. In 2024, Baty played in 50 games for the Mets, batting .229/.306/.327 with 4 home runs and 16 RBI.

Baty was named to the Mets' Opening Day roster for the 2025 season. On April 24, 2025, Baty was optioned to Triple-A Syracuse after Jeff McNeil was activated from the injured list. On May 5, Baty was recalled up to the majors when Jesse Winker was placed on the 10-day injured list with a grade 2 right oblique strain. In 2025, Baty played in 130 games with the Mets, batting .254/.313/.435 with 18 home runs and 50 RBI. He suffered a strained oblique on September 27, ending his season. On August 10, 2026 Baty hit his first career grand slam off of Atlanta Braves pitcher Bryce Elder, however they would go on to win the game 8–5 runs.
