= 1978 WCT Tournament of Champions – Singles =

Singles
- 1978 WCT Tournament of Champions

Final
- Champion: (Sweden) Björn Borg
- Runner-up: (United States) Vitas Gerulaitis
- Score: 6–5, 5–6, 6–4, 6–5

Details
- Draw: 16
- Seeds: 4
← 1977 ·	WCT Tournament of Champions	· 1979 →

Harold Solomon was the defending champion, but lost in semifinals to Vitas Gerulaitis.

Second-seeded Björn Borg won the title by defeating third-seeded Vitas Gerulaitis 6–5, 5–6, 6–4, 6–5 in the final.

== Seeds ==
1. (United States) Jimmy Connors (first round)
2. (Sweden) Björn Borg (champion)
3. (United States) Vitas Gerulaitis (final)
4. (United States) Eddie Dibbs (quarterfinals)

== Draw ==
First round
1	(United States) Jimmy Connors	3	0
(United States) Jeff Borowiak	6	6
(India) Vijay Amritraj	4	4
(United States) Harold Solomon	6	6
(United States) Sandy Mayer	6	6
(Romania) Ilie Năstase	2	2
(Australia) John Alexander	3	3
3	(United States) Vitas Gerulaitis	6	6
4	(United States) Eddie Dibbs	6	6
(Australia) Ken Rosewall	3	4
(South Africa) Cliff Drysdale	6	6
(United States) Tim Gullikson	1	2
(United States) Dick Stockton	6	4	5
(Australia) Tony Roche	5	6	6
(Australia) Rod Laver	4	2
2	(Sweden) Björn Borg	6	6

Quarterfinals
(United States) Jeff Borowiak	4	2
(United States) Harold Solomon	6	6
(United States) Sandy Mayer	4	6	3
3	(United States) Vitas Gerulaitis	6	5	6
4	(United States) Eddie Dibbs	3	2
(South Africa) Cliff Drysdale	6	6
(Australia) Tony Roche	4	2
2	(Sweden) Björn Borg	6	6

Semifinals
(United States) Harold Solomon	4	1
3	(United States) Vitas Gerulaitis	6	6
(South Africa) Cliff Drysdale	4	5
2	(Sweden) Björn Borg	6	6

Final
3	(United States) Vitas Gerulaitis	5	6	4	5
2	(Sweden) Björn Borg	6	5	6	6
