= The Hills, Texas =

- Type B general law city
- Coordinates: 30°20′47″N 97°59′11″W
- Country: United States
- State: Texas
- County: Travis

Area
  - Total: 1.07 sq mi (2.78 km^{2})
  - Land: 1.07 sq mi (2.78 km^{2})
  - Water: 0 sq mi (0.00 km^{2})
- Elevation: 824 ft (251 m)

Population (2020)
  - Total: 2,613
  - Density: 2,316.3/sq mi (894.34/km^{2})
- Time zone: UTC-6 (Central (CST))
  - Summer (DST): UTC-5 (CDT)
- Zip Code: 78738
- FIPS code: 48-72578
- GNIS feature ID: 2413592
- Website: http://www.villageofthehills.org

The Hills is a village in Travis County, Texas, United States. The population was 2,613 at the 2020 census, making it the largest village in Texas. It is a suburb of Austin.

== Geography ==
The Hills is located 16 miles (26 km) west of downtown Austin.

According to the United States Census Bureau, the village has a total area of 1.1 square miles (2.8 km^{2}), all land.

== Demographics ==
Historical population
Census	Pop.	Note	%±
2000	1,492		—
2010	2,472		65.7%
2020	2,613		5.7%
U.S. Decennial Census

The Hills racial composition as of 2020 (NH = Non-Hispanic) (Note: Note: the US Census treats Hispanic/Latino as an ethnic category. This table excludes Latinos from the racial categories and assigns them to a separate category. Hispanics/Latinos can be of any race.)
Race	Number	Percentage
White (NH)	2,141	81.94%
Black or African American (NH)	39	1.49%
Native American or Alaska Native (NH)	8	0.31%
Asian (NH)	70	2.68%
Some other race (NH)	9	0.34%
Mixed/multi-racial (NH)	148	5.66%
Hispanic or Latino	198	7.58%
Total	2,613	

As of the 2020 United States census, there were 2,613 people, 1,012 households, and 821 families residing in the village.

As of the census of 2000, there were 1,492 people, 585 households, and 503 families residing in the village. The population density was 1,400.6 inhabitants per square mile (540.8/km^{2}). There were 657 housing units at an average density of 616.7 per square mile (238.1/km^{2}). The racial makeup of the village was 97.18% White, 1.21% African American, 0.34% Native American, 0.67% Asian, 0.13% from other races, and 0.47% from two or more races. Hispanic or Latino people of any race were 2.21% of the population.

There were 585 households, out of which 30.4% had children under the age of 18 living with them, 82.1% were married couples living together, 2.1% had a female householder with no husband present, and 14.0% were non-families. 12.6% of all households were made up of individuals, and 5.8% had someone living alone who was 65 years of age or older. The average household size was 2.55 and the average family size was 2.77.

In the village, the population was spread out, with 22.7% under the age of 18, 3.2% from 18 to 24, 22.5% from 25 to 44, 33.0% from 45 to 64, and 18.6% who were 65 years of age or older. The median age was 46 years. For every 100 females, there were 100.5 males. For every 100 females age 18 and over, there were 97.6 males.

The median income for a household in the village was $114,861, and the median income for a family was $126,252. Males had a median income of $100,000 versus $41,964 for females. The per capita income for the village was $61,363. About 2.8% of families and 2.7% of the population were below the poverty line, including 2.6% of those under age 18 and 2.5% of those age 65 or over.

== Politics ==
The village of The Hills has supported all six GOP presidential campaigns since its date of incorporation, with a majority in each instance from 2004.

The Hills city vote by party in presidential elections
Year	Democratic	Republican	Third parties
2020	39.00% 2,025	59.73% 3,101	1.27% 77
2016	30.72% 1,035	64.44% 2,171	4.81% 162
2012	21.50% 580	77.50% 2,091	1.00% 27
2008	42.85% 1,054	55.81% 1,373	1.34% 33
2004	35.26% 852	63.25% 1,528	1.49% 36
2000	34.07% 337	35.69% 353	30.13% 298

== Education ==
The Lake Travis Independent School District serves village students. Lakeway Elementary School in Lakeway, Hudson Bend Middle School in an unincorporated area, and Lake Travis High School in an unincorporated area serve The Hills.

=== Public library ===
The Lake Travis Community Library (LTCL) in Lakeway serves The Hills. It originally opened in Lake Travis High School in 1985. Area voters approved the creation of the library district in May 2004. A notable local citizen donated the land for the library in March 2011, and the library moved into the current location in February 2013.
