= Bee Cave, Texas =

- City
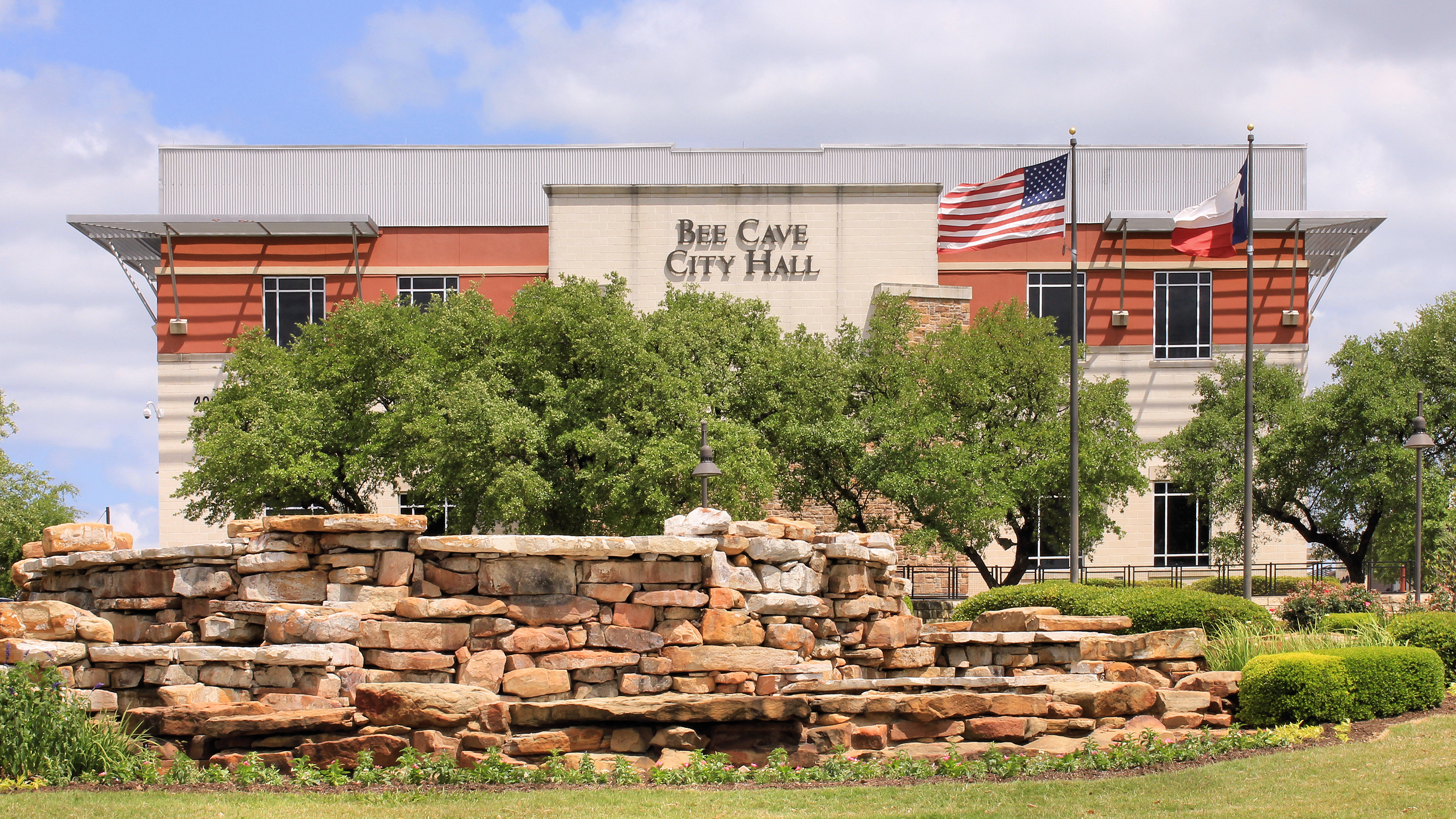
- City hall
- Interactive map of Bee Cave, Texas
- Coordinates: 30°18′25″N 97°57′55″W
- Country: United States
- State: Texas
- County: Travis
- Date of Incorporation: 1987

Area
  - Total: 8.58 sq mi (22.21 km^{2})
  - Land: 8.58 sq mi (22.21 km^{2})
  - Water: 0 sq mi (0.00 km^{2})
- Elevation: 929 ft (283 m)

Population (2020)
  - Total: 9,144
  - Density: 797.8/sq mi (308.04/km^{2})
- Time zone: UTC-6 (Central (CST))
  - Summer (DST): UTC-5 (CDT)
- Area code(s): 512 & 737
- FIPS code: 48-07156
- GNIS feature ID: 2413532
- Website: www.beecavetexas.gov

Bee Cave is a city located in Travis County, Texas, United States. Its population was 9,144 as of the 2020 census.

== History ==
Bee Cave was named by early settlers for a large cave of wild bees found near the site. A post office opened there under the name Bee Caves in 1870. The city was incorporated in 1987. Since April 2023, Bee Cave has been designated as an International Dark-Sky Community, making Bee Cave the seventh city in Texas and the 39th in the world with this distinction.

== Geography ==
Bee Cave is located 12 miles west of Austin.

According to the United States Census Bureau in 2010, the city has a total area of 2.6 square miles (6.7 km^{2}), all land. Prior to the 2010 census, Bee Cave went from being a village to being a city, increasing its area to 6.8 square miles (18 km^{2}), all land. It borders Lakeway to the northwest. The landscape of Bee Cave is generally hilly, with elevations ranging from 875 to 1,025 ft (267 to 312 m) above sea level.

=== Climate ===
Bee Cave has a humid, subtropical climate, Cfa in the Köppen climate classification. Generally, the city has long, hot summers and short, cool winters.

Climate data for Bee Cave
Month	Jan	Feb	Mar	Apr	May	Jun	Jul	Aug	Sep	Oct	Nov	Dec	Year
Mean daily maximum °F (°C)	61 (16)	66 (19)	73 (23)	79 (26)	85 (29)	91 (33)	94 (34)	95 (35)	89 (32)	80 (27)	70 (21)	63 (17)	79 (26)
Daily mean °F (°C)	51 (11)	54 (12)	61 (16)	68 (20)	75 (24)	81 (27)	83 (28)	84 (29)	79 (26)	70 (21)	60 (16)	52 (11)	68 (20)
Mean daily minimum °F (°C)	43 (6)	46 (8)	53 (12)	60 (16)	67 (19)	73 (23)	75 (24)	75 (24)	70 (21)	61 (16)	52 (11)	45 (7)	60 (16)
Average precipitation inches (mm)	1.6 (41)	1.7 (43)	2.1 (53)	2.1 (53)	3.9 (99)	3.1 (79)	1.6 (41)	1.7 (43)	2.5 (64)	3.0 (76)	2.3 (58)	1.7 (43)	27.3 (693)

== Demographics ==
Historical population
Census	Pop.	Note	%±
1990	241		—
2000	656		172.2%
2010	3,925		498.3%
2020	9,144		133.0%
U.S. Decennial Census

=== 2020 census ===
As of the 2020 census, Bee Cave had a population of 9,144, 3,720 households, and 1,731 families residing in the city. The population density was 252.0 inhabitants per square mile (97.3/km^{2}). The 4,044 housing units had an average density of 94.5 per square mile (36.5/km^{2}).

Racial composition as of the 2020 census
Race	Percent
White	69.6%
Black or African American	2.8%
American Indian and Alaska Native	0.2%
Asian	13.1%
Native Hawaiian and Other Pacific Islander	0.1%
Some other race	3.4%
Two or more races	10.9%
Hispanic or Latino (of any race)	12.8%

The median age was 39.4 years. 24.7% of residents were under the age of 18 and 14.1% of residents were 65 years of age or older. For every 100 females there were 96.2 males, and for every 100 females age 18 and over there were 92.9 males age 18 and over.

97.4% of residents lived in urban areas, while 2.6% lived in rural areas.

There were 3,720 households in Bee Cave, of which 34.5% had children under the age of 18 living in them. Of all households, 51.2% were married-couple households, 19.0% were households with a male householder and no spouse or partner present, and 24.7% were households with a female householder and no spouse or partner present. About 30.7% of all households were made up of individuals, and 8.4% had someone living alone who was 65 years of age or older. The average household size was 3.17 and the average family size was 3.38.

Of those housing units, 8.0% were vacant. Among occupied housing units, 47.8% were owner-occupied and 52.2% were renter-occupied. The homeowner vacancy rate was 1.0% and the rental vacancy rate was 10.4%.

In 2015, the median income for a household in the city was $129,270, and the median house value was $597,091. Males had a median income of $100,000 versus $59,000 for females. The per capita income for the city was $53,911. None of the families and 2.7% of the population were living below the poverty line, including none under 18 and none over 74.

== Government and infrastructure ==
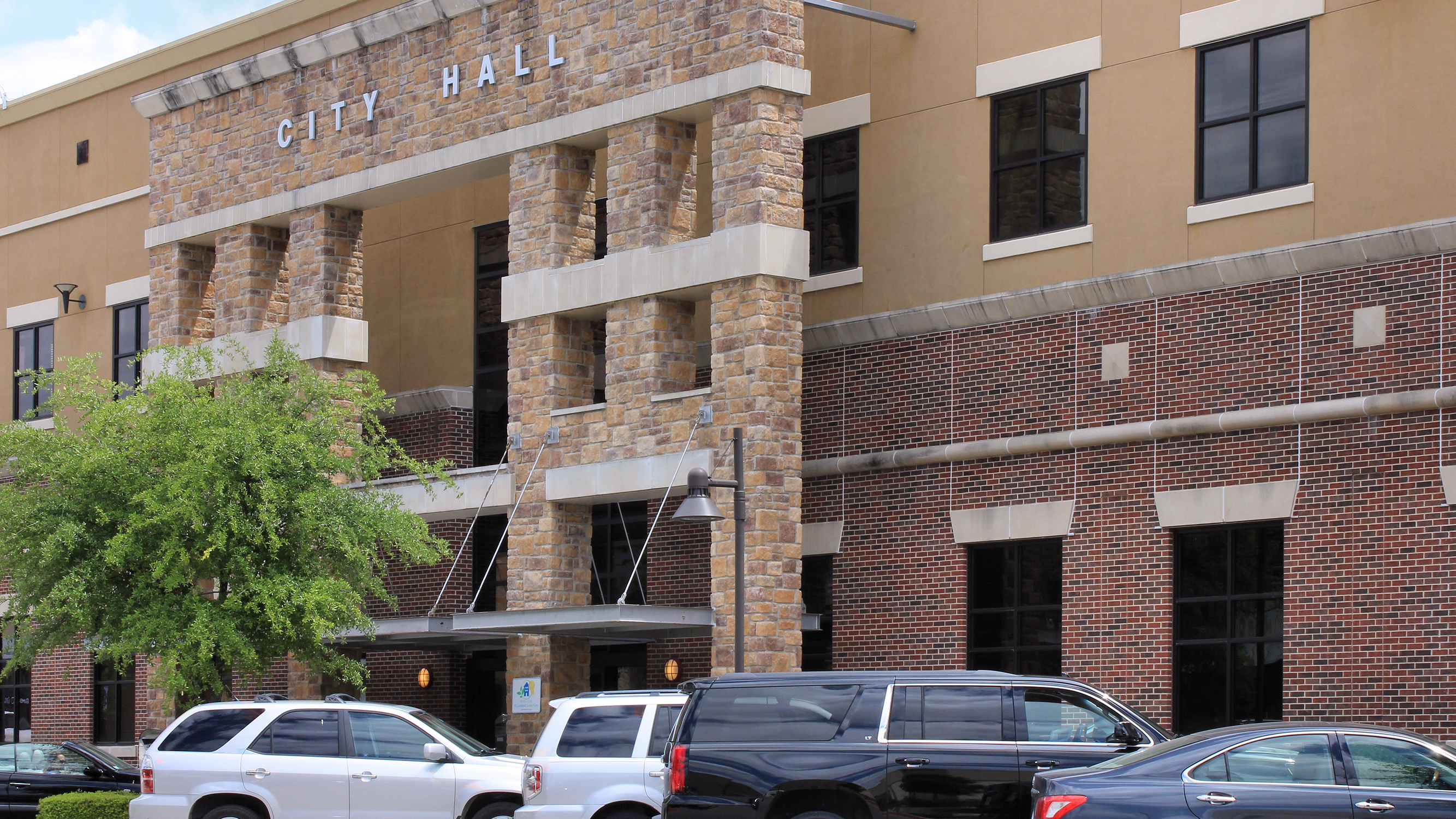
City Hall

=== Police ===
As of 2021, the City of Bee Cave is patrolled by the Bee Cave Police Department under the direction of Chief Brian Jones, a former commander with the Austin Police Department. As of 2017, the department has 20 officers and one civilian clerk.

== Government ==
Bee Cave has a council–manager form of government. As of 2020, the mayor of Bee Cave is Kara King.

== Education ==
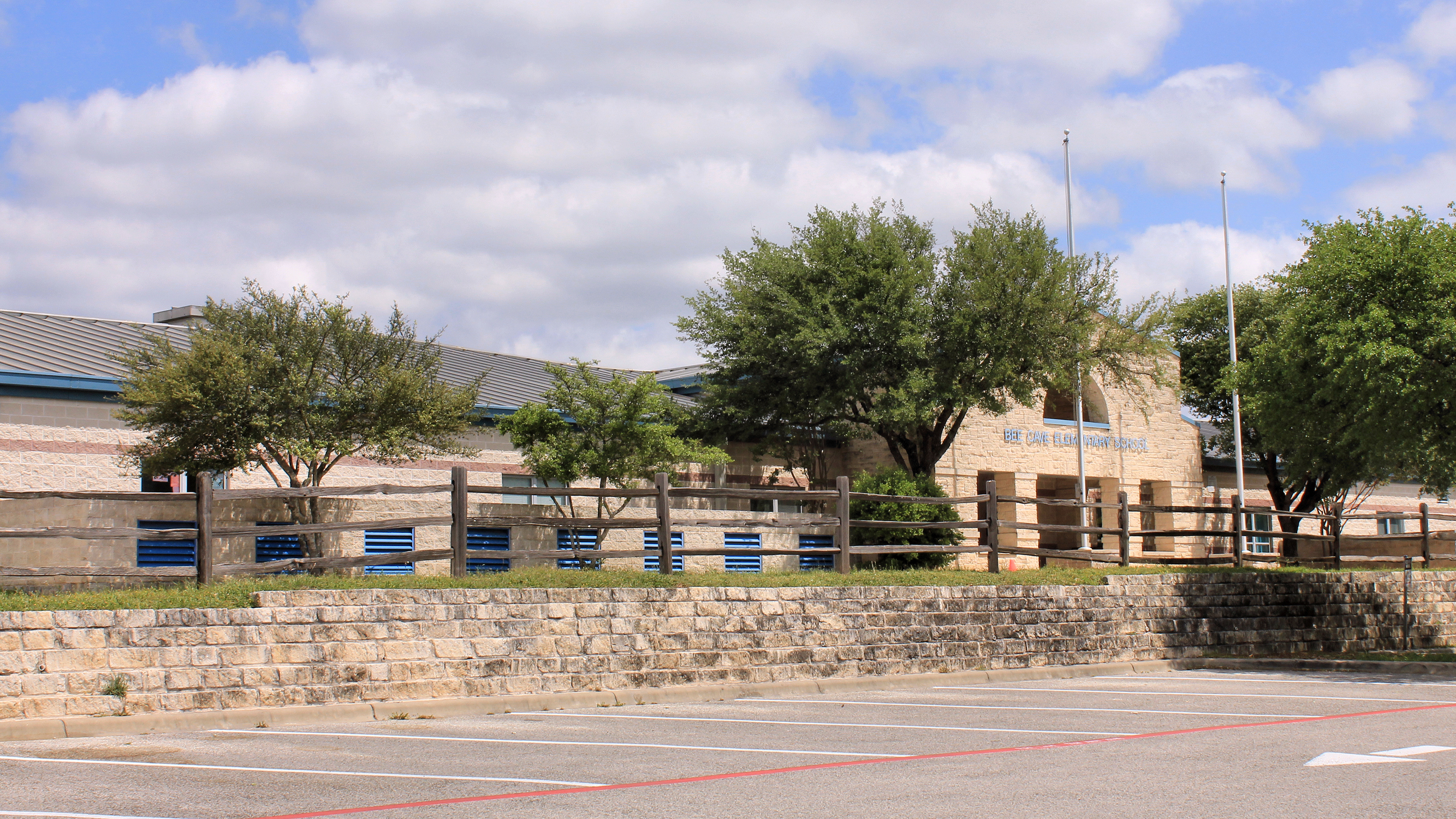
Bee Cave Elementary School

Bee Cave is served by the Lake Travis Independent School District. Three elementary schools, Bee Cave Elementary School in Bee Cave, Lake Pointe Elementary School in an unincorporated area, and Lakeway Elementary School in Lakeway, serve Bee Cave and sections of Lakeway. Lake Travis Middle School and Bee Cave Middle School serve most of Bee Cave, while Hudson Bend Middle School serves portions to the northwest; both schools are in unincorporated areas. Lake Travis High School, in an unincorporated area, serves all of Bee Cave.

Lake Travis Middle School served the entirety of Bee Cave until 2019, when Bee Cave Middle School began operations. It is now served by both schools.

== In popular culture ==
In 2007, the Texas Legislature declared the "West Pole of the Earth" to be located in Bee Cave.

Bee Cave is the canonical birthplace of Dr. Dell Conagher, known in-game as "The Engineer", from Valve's Team Fortress 2 (voiced by Grant Goodeve).
