= Hippie Hollow Park =

Park in the United States

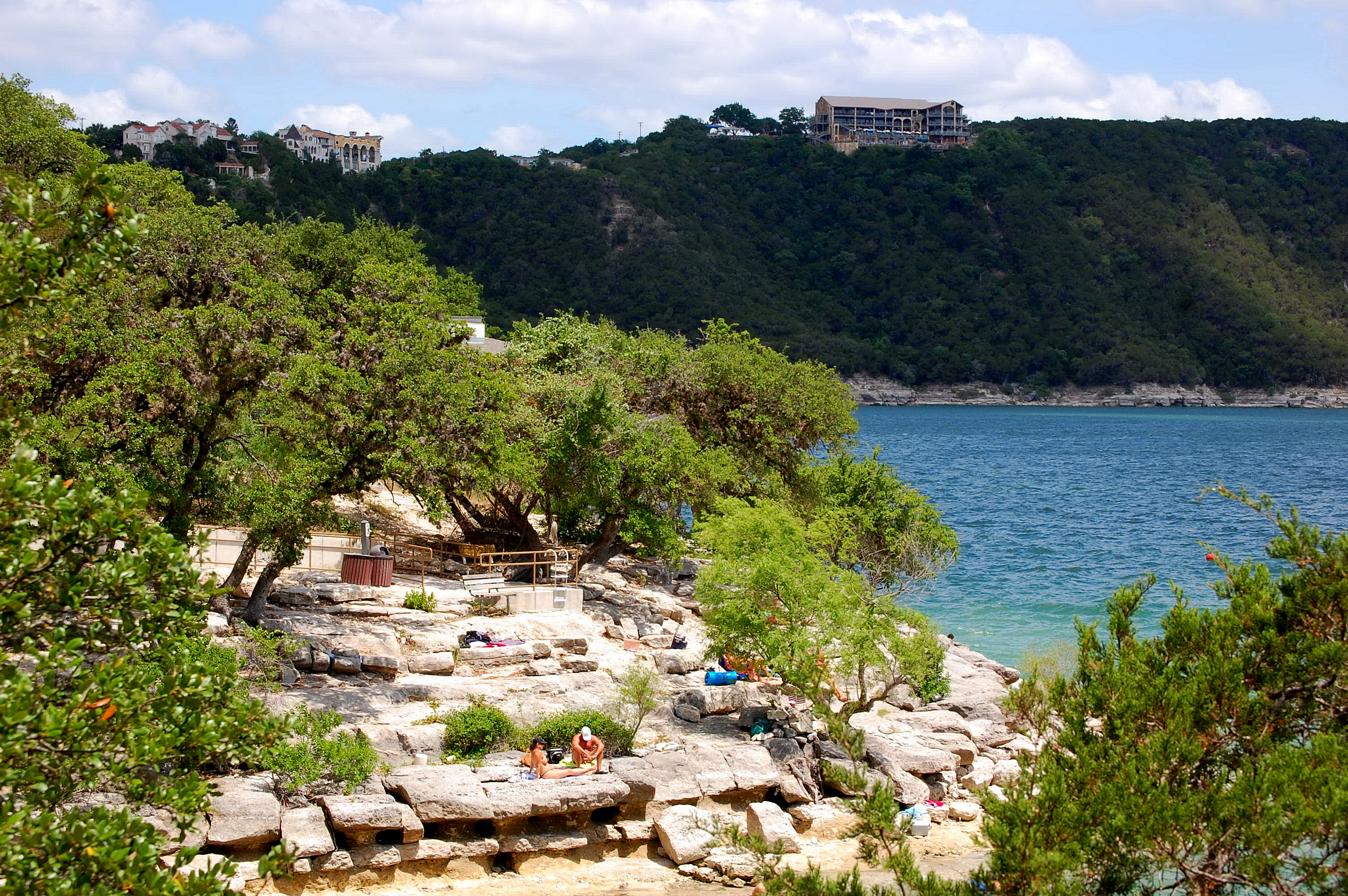
- Hippie Hollow Park
- Coordinates: 30°24′46″N 97°53′00″W
- Area: 109 acres (44 ha)
- Visitors: 350,000 (in 2005)
- Governing body: Travis County Parks

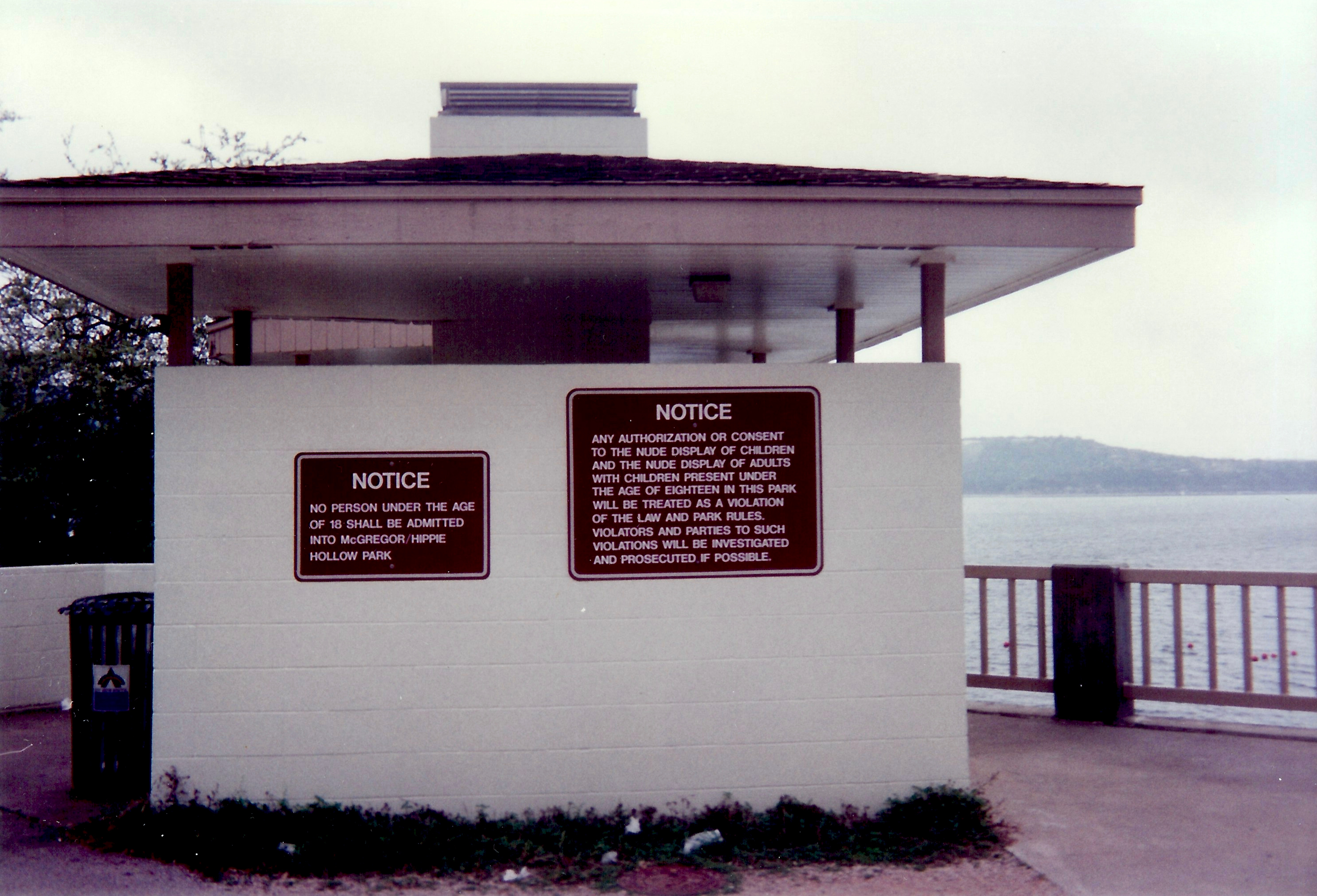
Hippie Hollow Park, Facility Building and Sign, March 1996

Hippie Hollow Park (originally known as McGregor County Park) is a park located on the shore of Lake Travis in northwest Austin. It is the only legally recognized clothing-optional public park in the State of Texas. Though the land is owned by the Lower Colorado River Authority, it is leased to Travis County, whose Parks Department has administered the park since 1985. Sometimes erroneously labeled as a beach, the park actually sits on a somewhat steep slope above Lake Travis with limestone steps that can be quite rugged in some spots. Depending on the water level of the lake, access to the water may require some rock climbing.

== History ==
Hippie Hollow Park has been used as a nude swimming spot for years, because the area was along a particularly remote section of the shoreline of Lake Travis. The area became more popular in the 1960s due to the cultural changes of that era and, after Woodstock, the nickname 'Hippie Hollow' was born. Hippie Hollow was controversial in the 1970s, due to increased skinny-dipping which generated complaints from adjacent landowners. Raymond Frank, the sheriff of Travis County from 1973 to 1980, determined that the county's law enforcement budget was better spent on more serious offenses, and skinny-dipping activities were generally ignored as long as no other laws were being broken.

In October 1983 the park site was leased to Travis County, and in October 1985 Hippie Hollow Park opened to visitors after some modest improvements and an extensive site clean-up by the county, replacing the former name of McGregor Park. The park continues as a clothing optional park, with appropriate signage at the park entrance advising visitors that nude swimming and sunbathing may be encountered. At one time the park was frequented by families, but many objected. On July 11, 1995, the county commissioners passed an ordinance restricting park usage to those over 18 years of age, as a result of Travis County Attorney Ken Oden's interpretation of nudity laws.

This ordinance was challenged in court by the Central Texas Nudists headed by Bob and Christine Morton, who, along with other naturist families, had been bringing their children to the site for years without incident. Part of Morton's argument was that the Texas Hill Country had been settled by many German and Czech immigrants in the middle-19th century, and nude sunbathing had been a part of their culture. An appeals court ruled in favor of the county in 1999, and the U.S. Supreme Court refused to hear the case (Central Texas Nudists vs. Travis County) in October 2001. Hippie Hollow remains clothing optional, but with park usage restricted to those over 18.

In 2004, a rented double-decker party barge carrying 60 people capsized and sank in front of Hippie Hollow when the passengers on board gathered on one side of the barge. The incident, which caused two minor injuries, occurred during Splash Day, a semiannual event hosted by Austin's gay and lesbian bar association.

== See also ==
- Clothes free organizations
- List of public outdoor clothes free places
- Naturism
- Nude beach
- Public nudity
