= Hurst Creek =

Tributary of the Colorado River in Texas

Coordinates: 30.3775°N 97.9645°W

Hurst Creek is a tributary of the Colorado River in Central Texas. Hurst Creek flows north through Lakeway and empties into Lake Travis.

Route of Hurst Creek

== See also ==
- List of Texas rivers
