= 1977 WCT Tournament of Champions =

Tennis tournament

- Date: March 10 — September 17
- Edition: 1st
- Category: World Championship Tennis
- Draw: 16S
- Prize money: $200,000
- Surface: Clay / outdoor Carpet / indoor
- Location: Lakeway, TX, US; New York, NY, US
- Venue: World of Tennis Resort; Madison Square Garden

Champions

Singles
- (United States) Harold Solomon
- WCT Tournament of Champions

The 1977 WCT Tournament of Champions, also known by its sponsored name Shakeys Tournament of Champions, was a men's tennis tournament that was part of the 1977 World Championship Tennis circuit. It was the first edition of the tournament and was held in Lakeway, Texas on March 10–13 (upper half of the draw) and July 10–13 (lower half of the draw), with the final played in the Madison Square Garden, New York on September 17, 1977. Harold Solomon won the title and earned $60,000 first-prize money.

== Final ==
=== Singles ===
(United States) Harold Solomon defeated (Australia) Ken Rosewall 6–5^{(7–5)}, 6–2, 2–6, 0–6, 6–3
