= Lake Travis Independent School District =

School district in Texas

Address
- 3324 Ranch Road 620 S. Austin, Texas, 78738; United States
- Coordinates: 30.3047°N 98.0247°W

District information
- Type: Public school district
- Motto: One Community. One Purpose. All Heart
- Grades: PK-12
- Established: 1981; 45 years ago
- Superintendent: Curtis Null
- Deputy superintendent(s): Dr. Holly Morris-Keuntz
- Schools: 11
- NCES District ID: 4826470

Students and staff
- Students: 11,272
- Teachers: 679.82 (on an FTE basis)
- Student–teacher ratio: 16.58:1

Other information
- Website: www.ltisdschools.org

Lake Travis Independent School District is a public school district headquartered in Austin, Texas, (USA). It was created on June 12, 1981, after school board members decided to split the Dripping Springs Independent School District in order to handle the growing population of the Lake Travis area.

In 2011, the school district was rated "Exemplary" by the Texas Education Agency.

== Geography ==
Lake Travis ISD covers approximately 118 square miles (310 km^{2}). Its boundaries are the Travis/Hays county line on the south, the shores of Lake Travis to the north, the Pedernales River to the west, and Lake Austin and Barton Creek to the east.

Incorporated communities in the district include Bee Cave, Briarcliff, Lakeway, and The Hills. Hudson Bend, a census-designated place, is also in the district.

As of 2013 LTISD covers 1.4 square miles (3.6 km^{2}) of land within the City of Austin, making up 0.4% of the city's territory.

== Schools ==
=== High School (Grades 9-12) ===
- Lake Travis High School - Unincorporated area

=== Middle Schools (Grades 6-8) ===
- Hudson Bend Middle School (Unincorporated area)
- Lake Travis Middle School (Spicewood, Unincorporated area)
- Bee Cave Middle School

=== Elementary Schools (Grades K-5) ===
- Bee Cave Elementary School (Bee Cave)
- Lake Pointe Elementary School (Unincorporated area)
- Lake Travis Elementary School (Lakeway)
- Lakeway Elementary School (Lakeway)
- Rough Hollow Elementary School (Rough Hollow)
- Serene Hills Elementary School (Lakeway)
- West Cypress Hills Elementary (Spicewood, Unincorporated area)

== Bonds ==
Voters in Lake Travis have approved of over $321 million in bonds for the LT school district for the past ten years.
