= Lake Travis High School =

American public high school

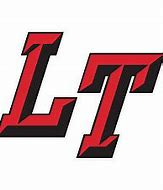

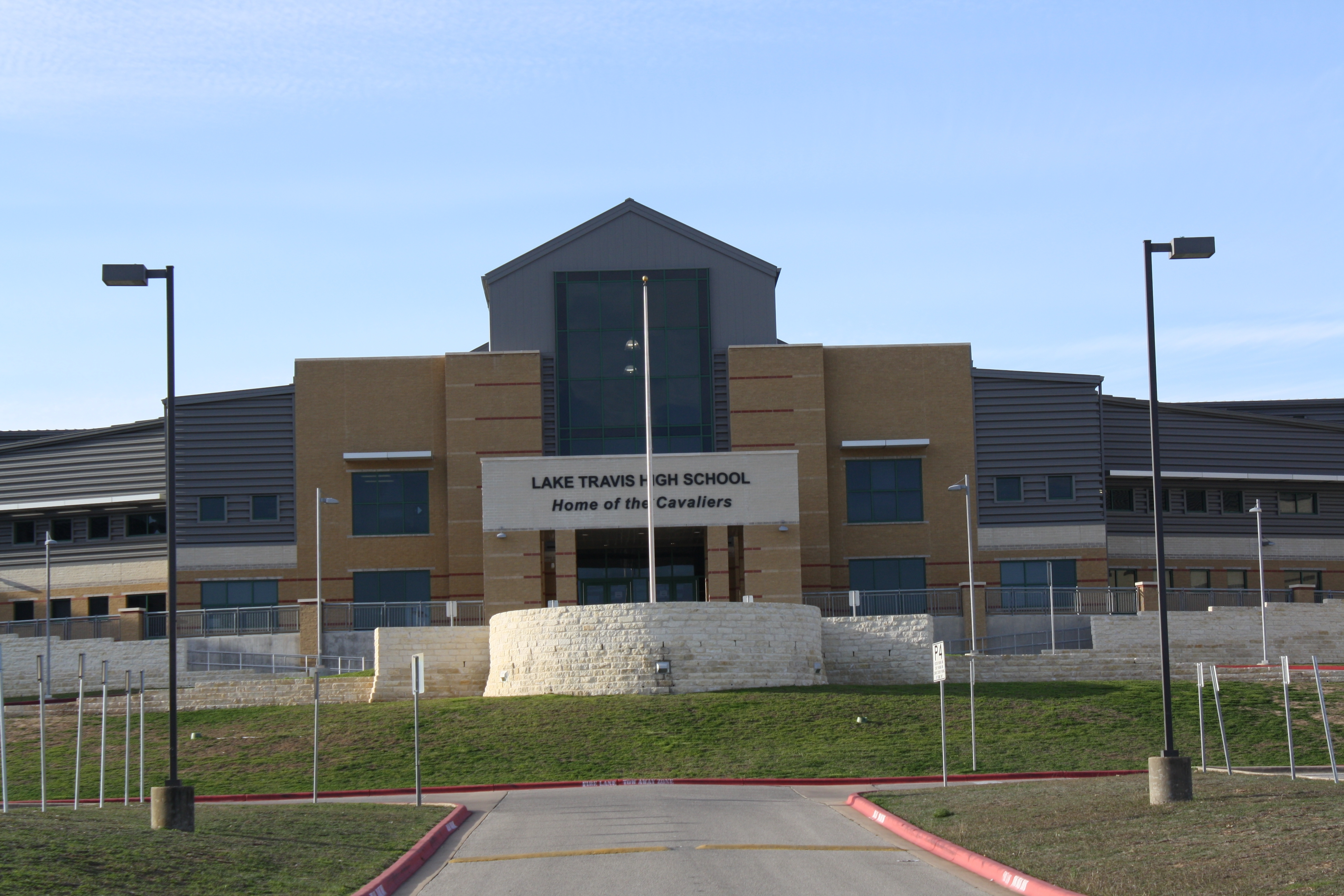

Location
- 3324 Ranch Road 620 South; Austin, Texas 78738; United States; 30°19′38″N 97°58′10″W

Information
- Type: Public High School
- Established: 1981
- School district: Lake Travis Independent School District
- Superintendent: Curtis Null
- Principal: James Bush
- Teaching staff: 207.93 (on an FTE basis)
- Grades: 9–12
- Enrollment: 3,428 (2025-2026)
- Student to teacher ratio: 17.68
- Colors: Red , Black , Silver and White
- Athletics conference: UIL Class 6A
- Nickname: Cavaliers
- Website: School Website

Lake Travis High School is a public high school located in unincorporated Travis County, Texas, United States, approximately 20 miles (32 km) west of Austin, near Lake Travis. The preparatory is accredited by the Texas Education Agency and rated as an exemplary secondary by TEA standards. LTHS serves students in grades nine through twelve who live in southwest Travis County and is part of the Lake Travis Independent School District.

LTHS and LTISD were both established in 1981 after splitting from the Dripping Springs Independent School District. The current high school was built in 1988. Because of major growth in the Austin Metropolitan Area, the high school has undergone several expansion projects. Due to the increase in student population, LTHS was reclassified in 2012 as a member of the UIL 5A conference. LTHS was again reclassified in 2014 when Texas added a 6A classification.

As the only high school in LTISD, it serves Bee Cave, Briarcliff, Lakeway, The Hills, and Hudson Bend, along with 1.4 square miles (3.6 km^{2}) of land within the City of Austin.

== History and academics ==
Lake Travis High School has more than 200 academic courses including 25 Advanced Placement (AP) courses and 30 Pre-AP/Honors courses. The school also offers students membership in more than 50 student clubs and organizations. Lake Travis HS offers elective courses which are housed within the Institutes of Study, a comprehensive academic program that allows students to pursue an area of study in depth. The six Institutes of Study are: Institute of Advanced Sciences & Medicine, Institute of Business, Finance & Marketing, Institute of Veterinary & Agricultural Science, Institute of Humanities, Technology & Communications, Institute of Math, Engineering & Architecture, and the Institute of Fine Arts. A special education program also exists to meet the needs of identified students. Lake Travis won the UIL-4A Lone Star Cup for the 2011-2012 school year. The cup is awarded to the states overall top high school based on academic and athletic achievements.

== Student demographics ==
As of the 2019–2020 school year, Lake Travis HS's racial diversity is 68.6% White, 19.4% Hispanic, 5.6% Asian, 4.8% identified as two or more races, 1.3% Black and 0.3% other.

== Programs ==
=== Athletics ===
==== Football ====
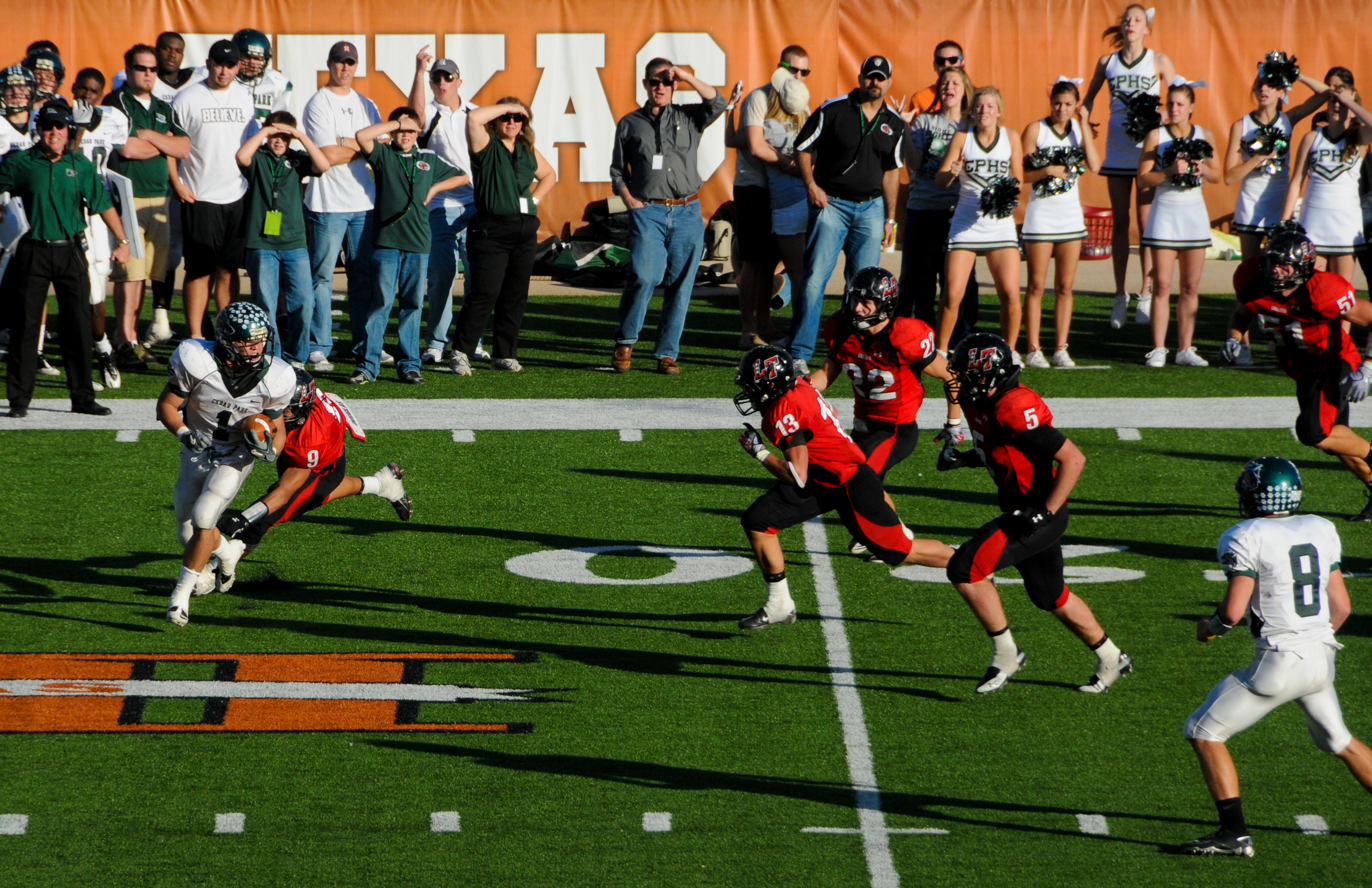
A football game of the Lake Travis Cavaliers vs the Cedar Park Timberwolves

The Football sports team are the "Cavaliers", named after the mascot of the school with uniform colors being red, black and silver. In 2011, Lake Travis High School became the first football program in Texas to have won five consecutive state championships. In the 2007 season, Lake Travis won its first ever football state championship against Highland Park 36-34. In 2008, LT defeated Longview 48-23 in the championship game. In 2009, LT had another undefeated season, once again beating Longview (24-17) in the 2009 Texas 4A Championship Game. In 2010, LT reached the UIL 4A State Championship Game at Cowboys Stadium in Arlington. In that game, LT defeated the #3 ranked Denton Ryan Raiders 27-7; giving the Cavs their fourth consecutive state championship, making them the only 4A or 5A Texas school to accomplish this feat. In 2011, the Cavs again went undefeated, and defeated Waco Midway 22-7 in the state championship game. In 2016, the Cavaliers won their sixth state championship. NFL quarterbacks Baker Mayfield and Garrett Gilbert both played for the Cavs. Lake Travis is generally regarded as one of the top D1 quarterback producing schools in the country.

==== Soccer ====
The Lake Travis men's soccer team won the Texas 6A state championship title in 2022.

==== Rugby ====
Lake Travis won the Texas State High School Rugby Championship in 2013 and is ranked 18th in the nation after only three seasons in existence. They outscored their division opponents 247-0 and all opponents through their championship victory 401 - 24.

==== Sailing ====
The LTHS Sailing Team won the Texas State Sailing Championship in 2018, 2019, and 2022. The Sailing Team is based at the Austin Yacht Club and is the only co-ed sport offered at LTHS.

==== Basketball ====
The LTHS Men's Basketball team appeared at the 2010 state semi-finals and are coached by Clint Baty.

==== Cheerleading ====
Lake Travis won the National Cheerleaders Association (NCA) Senior and Junior High School National Championship held December 28–29, 2008 at the Dallas Convention Center.

==== Golf ====
The boys team won the 3A state title in 1997, the 4A state title in 2011 and 2012, the 5A state title in 2013, and the 6A title in 2024. The girls team also won the 5A state title in 2013, the 6A state title in 2015, 2016, and 2017.

==== Volleyball ====
Members of the Lake Travis HS Volleyball Team are known as the Lady Cavs. The team won the Texas 4A State Championship in 2010 and 2011.

In 2010, the Lady Cav Volleyball Team became the first LTHS girls team to win a state championship. The following year, in 2011, the Lady Cavs were ranked as the number one high school volleyball team in the nation. They finished with a 50-0 record and a second straight state title.

=== Fine Arts ===
==== Band ====
In 2012, the Lake Travis High School Drumline received first place and the title of state champion in the Percussion Scholastic A classification of the Texas Color Guard Circuit, in 2013, received first place and the title of state champion in the Percussion Scholastic Marching Open classification of the Texas Color Guard Circuit. In 2021, the band experienced their most successful season to date, qualifying for the UIL State Marching Championship and placing 19th at Bands Of America San Antonio Super Regional, the strongest showing in school history.

Lake Travis' band program is the largest student organization in the district, rapidly expanding to over 200 members in the 2023-24 school year following a successful marching band and winter guard season.

==== Cavalettes ====
In 2012, the Cavalettes dance/drill team performed at the Tournament of Roses Parade, marking the first time in the history of the parade that a high school drill and dance team performed an opening number. In 2013 and 2017, The Cavalettes also performed in Orlando, Florida at Downtown Disney.

== Notable alumni ==
- Brett Baty, American baseball player
- Michael Brewer, American football player
- Hudson Card, American football player
- Daniel Castano, American baseball player
- Cameron Dicker, American football player
- Garrett Gilbert, American football player
- Brenden Jaimes, American football player
- Baker Mayfield, American football player
- Lake McRee, American football player
- Todd Reesing, American football player
- Chris Roller, American baseball player
- Chance Ruffin, American baseball player
- Robert Turner, American football player
- Garrett Wilson, American football player
- Nate Yarnell, American football player
