= 1983 WCT Tournament of Champions =

- Date: May 1–8
- Edition: 7th
- Category: World Championship Tennis
- Draw: 42S / 24D
- Prize money: $300,000
- Surface: Clay / outdoor
- Location: Forest Hills, Queens, New York
- Venue: West Side Tennis Club

Champions

Singles
- (United States) John McEnroe

Doubles
- (United States) Tracy Delatte / (United States) Johan Kriek
- WCT Tournament of Champions

The 1983 WCT Tournament of Champions, also known by its sponsored name Mercedes Tournament of Champions, was a men's tennis tournament played on outdoor clay courts in Forest Hills, Queens, New York City in the United States that was part of the World Championship Tennis circuit. It was the seventh edition of the tournament and was held from May 1 through May 8, 1983. Second-seeded John McEnroe won the singles title.

== Finals ==
=== Singles ===
(United States) John McEnroe defeated (United States) Vitas Gerulaitis 6–3, 7–5

- It was McEnroe's 3rd singles title of the year and the 42nd of his career.

=== Doubles ===
(United States) Tracy Delatte / (United States) Johan Kriek defeated (South Africa) Kevin Curren / (United States) Steve Denton 6–7, 7–5, 6–3
