= WCT Tournament of Champions =

Defunct tennis tournament
- Tour: WCT Tour, Grand Prix Tour 1985–1989
- Founded: 1977
- Abolished: 1990
- Editions: 14
- Location: Lakeway, Texas (1977); Las Vegas, NV (1978); Dorado Beach, Puerto Rico (1979); Forest Hills (1980–1990)
- Surface: Carpet (1977, 1978); Hard (1979, 1990); Clay (1977, 1980–1989)

The WCT Tournament of Champions (also Shakeys Tournament of Champions for sponsorship purposes in 1977 and 1978) is a defunct men's tennis tournament that was held on the WCT Tour from 1977 to 1990. It was held in Lakeway, Texas in 1977, Las Vegas, Nevada in 1978, Dorado Beach, Puerto Rico in 1979, and Forest Hills, New York City from 1980 to 1990.

The tournament commenced in early May each year. Ivan Lendl won the event a record four times. The US achieved a consistent level of success at the event, with seven of the thirteen tournaments won by Americans. In 1985 it was a major ranking tournament as part of the Grand Prix Super Series and remained so until 1989.

The 1990 edition was the final tournament played in the 23-year history of World Championship Tennis as the organization announced its dissolution the day after the final.

== Results ==
=== Singles ===
Location	Year	Champions	Runners-up	Score
Lakeway	1977	(United States) Harold Solomon	(Australia) Ken Rosewall	6–5^{(7–5)}, 6–2, 2–6, 0–6, 6–3
Las Vegas	1978	(Sweden) Björn Borg	(United States) Vitas Gerulaitis	6–5, 5–6, 6–4, 6–5
Dorado Beach	1979	(United States) Jimmy Connors	(United States) Vitas Gerulaitis	6–5, 6–0, 6–4
Forest Hills	1980	(United States) Vitas Gerulaitis	(United States) John McEnroe	2–6, 6–2, 6–0
Forest Hills	1981	(United States) Eddie Dibbs	(Brazil) Carlos Kirmayr	6–3, 6–2
Forest Hills	1982	(Czechoslovakia) Ivan Lendl	(United States) Eddie Dibbs	6–1, 6–1
Forest Hills	1983	(United States) John McEnroe	(United States) Vitas Gerulaitis	6–3, 7–5
Forest Hills	1984	(United States) John McEnroe (2)	(Czechoslovakia) Ivan Lendl	6–4, 6–2
Forest Hills	1985	(Czechoslovakia) Ivan Lendl (2)	(United States) John McEnroe	6–3, 6–3
Forest Hills	1986	(France) Yannick Noah	(Argentina) Guillermo Vilas	7–6, 6–0
Forest Hills	1987	(Ecuador) Andrés Gómez	(France) Yannick Noah	6–4, 7–6, 7–6
Forest Hills	1988	(United States) Andre Agassi	(Socialist Federal Republic of Yugoslavia) Slobodan Živojinović	7–5, 7–6, 7–5
Forest Hills	1989	(Czechoslovakia) Ivan Lendl (3)	(Peru) Jaime Yzaga	6–2, 6–1
Forest Hills	1990	(Czechoslovakia) Ivan Lendl (4)	(United States) Aaron Krickstein	6–4, 6–7, 6–3

=== Doubles ===
Location	Year	Champions	Runners-up	Score
Forest Hills	1980	(United States) Peter Fleming (United States) John McEnroe	(Australia) Peter McNamara (Australia) Paul McNamee	6–2, 5–7, 6–2
Forest Hills	1981	(United States) Peter Fleming (United States) John McEnroe	(Australia) John Fitzgerald (United States) Andy Kohlberg	6–4, 6–4
Forest Hills	1982	(United States) Tracy Delatte (United States) Johan Kriek	(United States) Dick Stockton (United States) Erik van Dillen	6–4, 3–6, 6–3
Forest Hills	1983	(United States) Tracy Delatte (United States) Johan Kriek	(South Africa) Kevin Curren (United States) Steve Denton	6–7, 7–5, 6–3
Forest Hills	1984	(United States) David Dowlen (Nigeria) Nduka Odizor	(United States) Ernie Fernandez (United States) David Pate	7–6, 7–5
Forest Hills	1985	(United States) Ken Flach (United States) Robert Seguso	(Brazil) Givaldo Barbosa (Brazil) Ivan Kley	7–5, 6–2
Forest Hills	1986	(Chile) Hans Gildemeister (Ecuador) Andrés Gómez	(Germany) Boris Becker (Socialist Federal Republic of Yugoslavia) Slobodan Živojinović	7–6, 7–5
Forest Hills	1987	(France) Guy Forget (France) Yannick Noah	(United States) Gary Donnelly (United States) Peter Fleming	4–6, 6–4, 6–1
Forest Hills	1988	(Mexico) Jorge Lozano (United States) Todd Witsken	(South Africa) Pieter Aldrich (South Africa) Danie Visser	6–3, 7–6
Forest Hills	1989	(United States) Rick Leach (United States) Jim Pugh	(United States) Jim Courier (United States) Pete Sampras	6–4, 6–2

== See also ==
- WCT Finals
