= 1980 WCT Tournament of Champions =

- Date: May 5–11
- Edition: 4th
- Category: Grand Prix (WCT)
- Draw: 64S / 32D
- Prize money: $300,000
- Surface: Clay / outdoor
- Location: Forest Hills, Queens, New York, United States
- Venue: West Side Tennis Club

Champions

Singles
- (United States) Vitas Gerulaitis

Doubles
- (United States) Peter Fleming / (United States) John McEnroe
- WCT Tournament of Champions

The 1980 WCT Tournament of Champions was a men's tennis tournament played on outdoor clay courts at the West Side Tennis Club in Forest Hills, Queens, New York City in the United States and part of the 1980 Grand Prix circuit. It was the fourth edition of the tournament and was held from May 5 through May 11, 1980. Third-seeded Vitas Gerulaitis won the singles title.

== Finals ==
=== Singles ===
(United States) Vitas Gerulaitis defeated (United States) John McEnroe 2–6, 6–2, 6–0

- It was Gerulaitis' first singles title of the year and the 16th of his career.

=== Doubles ===
(United States) Peter Fleming / (United States) John McEnroe defeated (Australia) Peter McNamara/ (Australia) Paul McNamee 6–2, 5–7, 6–2
