= Lake Travis =

Reservoir in central Texas, USA

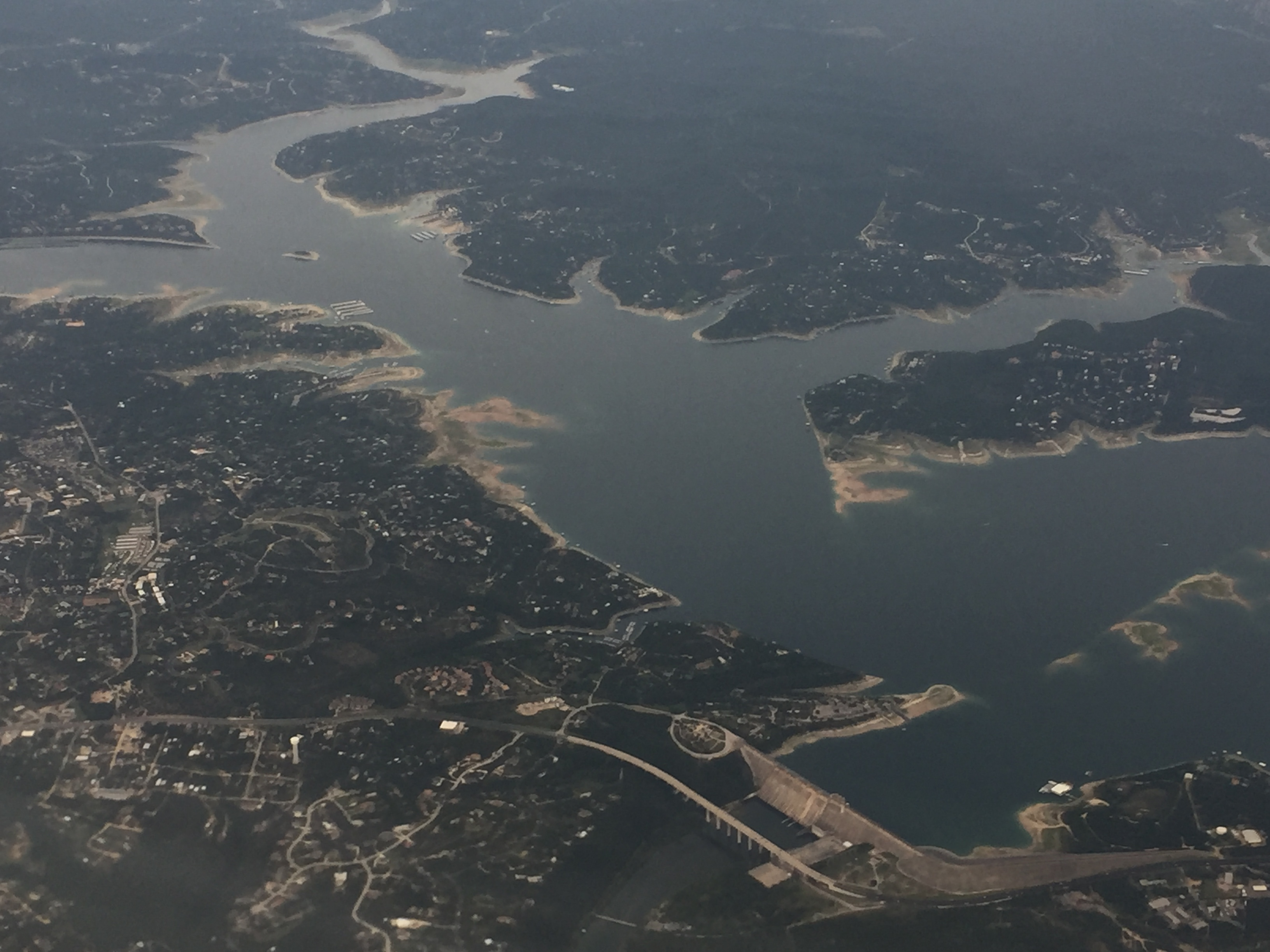
- Aerial view of Lake Travis in 2018

- Location within Texas Location within the United States
- Location: Travis / Burnet counties, northwest of Austin, Texas
- Coordinates: 30°23′31″N 97°54′24″W
- Lake type: Hydroelectric reservoir
- Primary inflows: Colorado River
- Primary outflows: Colorado River
- Basin countries: United States
- Surface area: 18,930 acres (7,660 ha)
- Max. depth: 210 ft (64 m)
- Water volume: 1,130,000 acre⋅ft (1.39 km^{3})
- Shore length^{1}: 270 mi (434 km)
- Surface elevation: 681 ft (208 m)
- ^{1} Shore length is not a well-defined measure.

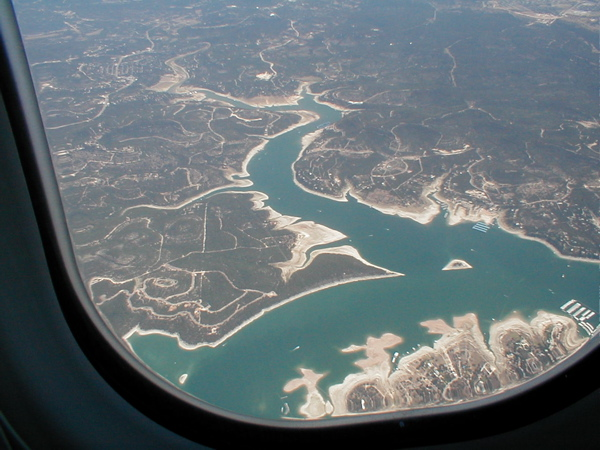
Aerial view of Lake Travis

Lake Travis is a reservoir on the Colorado River in central Texas in the United States. It is named in honor of William B. Travis.

Serving principally as a flood-control reservoir, Lake Travis' historical minimum to maximum water height change is nearly 100 feet. Following the 2018 Llano River flood, Lake Travis saw a 20-foot depth increase within a single 24-hour period of time. With 30 square miles of surface area, Lake Travis has the largest storage capacity of the seven reservoirs known as the Highland Lakes, and stretches 65 miles (105 km) upriver from western Travis County (near Lago Vista, Texas) in a highly serpentine course into southern Burnet County to Max Starcke Dam, southwest of the town of Marble Falls. Besides being used for flood control and as a water supply, the lake is also used for electrical power generation and recreation.

The Pedernales River, a major tributary of the Colorado River, flows into the lake from southwestern Travis County.

== History ==
=== Creation ===
The reservoir was formed in 1942 by the construction of Mansfield Dam on the western edge of Austin, Texas, by the Lower Colorado River Authority (LCRA), and was built specifically to contain floodwaters in a flash-flood prone region. During its construction, after a severe flood in July 1938, the height of the dam was raised to add storage capacity for floodwaters.

=== Ferry service ===
Regularly scheduled ferry service between Point Venture and the south side of Hurst Creek began in April 1971, operated by Point Venture Development Co. The trip took 20 minutes and was the only inland ferry service in Texas at the time. Ferry service ended in 1973.

=== September 2020 boat sinkings ===
On September 5th, 2020, a boat parade took place in support of Donald Trump. The Travis County Sheriff's office reported that they had received multiple calls involving boats in distress, and that several boats had sunk. The weather was calm, but the boats generated significant wake as they began to move together, which subsequently sank at least five boats. The hashtag #dumbkirk trended on Twitter following the incident.

== Recreational uses ==
Lake Travis is well known for its outdoor recreation opportunities, including fishing, boating, swimming, scuba diving, picnicking, camping, and zip lining. Hippie Hollow Park, located near the eastern end of Lake Travis, is the only legal clothing optional park in Texas. Lake Travis is generally considered one of the clearest lakes in Texas. It is a vital water supply for the nearby city of Austin, Texas, and the surrounding metropolitan area.

=== Fatality rankings ===
In a ranking of Texas lakes by accidental fatalities, Lake Travis was in first place in 2011 and tied for second place for total deaths from 2000 to 2015.

Six people drowned in Lake Travis in 2018, out of 29 total boating deaths reported across Texas that year.

=== Fish populations ===
Lake Travis has been stocked with several species of fish intended to improve the utility of the reservoir for recreational fishing. Fish present in Lake Travis include largemouth bass, guadalupe bass, white bass, striped bass, catfish and sunfish. Lake Travis is a popular fishing destination for anglers in Texas not only because of its stocked inventory but because of the convenient boating services and marinas in the area.

In spring 2008 there were several reports of leeches residing in Lake Travis. The leeches are generally harmless to humans but can be a nuisance.

== Lake levels ==
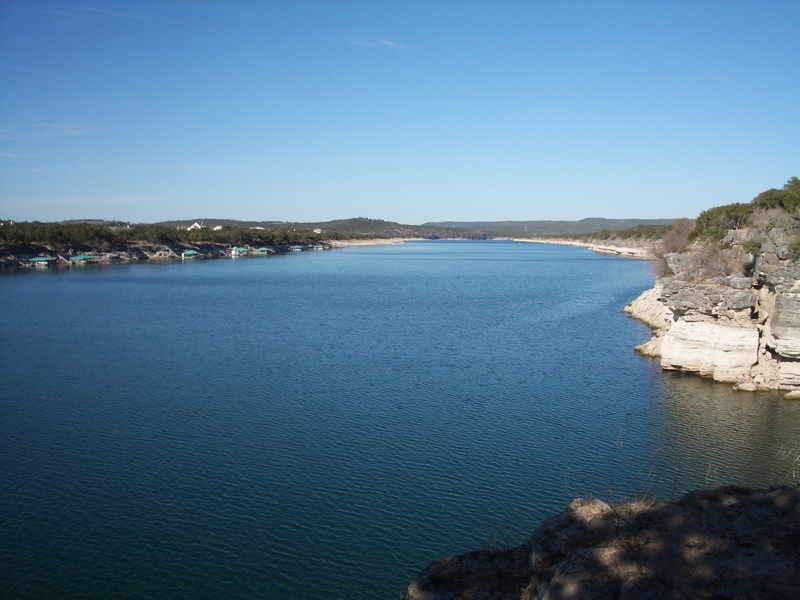
Thurmann Cove

Lake Travis is considered "full" (at maximum desired capacity) when the lake's water level is at 681 feet (208 m) above mean sea level (msl). Above 681 feet (208 m), flood control gates at Mansfield Dam are opened under the direction of the U.S. Army Corps of Engineers.

The level of the lake can vary dramatically—with an over 96-foot range between its historical high and low—depending on the amount of rainfall in the Colorado River basin upstream. The historic high level on the lake was 710.4 feet (216.5 m) above msl on December 25, 1991, a little less than four feet below the dam's top/spillway at 714 feet (218 m) above msl. The historic low was 614.2 feet (187.2 m) above msl on August 14, 1951.

=== Droughts ===
The extreme drought of 2008–2009 brought the lake to its fourth lowest level at 626.09 feet (190.83 m) above msl in November 2009. The second lowest level was 615.02 feet (187.46 m) above msl on November 8, 1963. During the 2010–13 Southern United States drought, levels went as low as 618 feet, making it the third lowest level ever. The LCRA, a public utility whose responsibilities include the management of Lake Travis, makes water level reports available on the internet. In April 2016, the lake returned to its full capacity at 681 ft.

=== Floods ===
Lake Travis serves as the primary flood control reservoir of the Highland Lake chain. The LCRA, under advisement from the U.S. Army Corps of Engineers, is responsible for floodgate operations at Mansfield Dam. Ideally, this is done in a time-delayed fashion after a major rainfall so as to either mitigate or outright prevent downstream flooding which otherwise would have been both immediate and extreme without the dam's presence. As Lake Travis levels increase during major floods, floodgate operations are conducted to protect property around Lake Travis as well as the dam itself.

While the dam's physical design assists in its own protection during floods, extensive spillway operations, a worst-case scenario which has not happened in the lake's history, could undermine the dam's base and affect its overall integrity. Under such conditions, operations are primarily intended to protect the dam, and lake water may be released to the dam's full, 24-floodgate capacity—regardless of downstream effects—to prevent the catastrophic loss of the dam. Including its hydroelectric generators but not the spillway, at 681 feet above msl the dam's total maximum discharge capacity is more than 130,000 cubic feet per second (cfs); a bit under one million gallons per second. Rates of discharge increase as water levels/pressures increase.

=== 2025 flood impact and reopening ===
In July 2025, Lake Travis was affected by severe flooding following heavy storms over the July 4 weekend in Central Texas. On July 11, Travis County Judge Andy Brown issued an executive order temporarily closing the entire lake to recreational, commercial, and navigational activities. The closure cited safety concerns due to submerged debris, damaged buoys, unsafe roads, and elevated bacteria levels.

The county updated the order on July 13, reopening most of the lake to boating and other recreational activities, with the exception of Sandy Creek Park and the area upstream of mile marker 36, which remained closed due to ongoing hazards.

Officials advised boaters to take safety precautions, including avoiding nighttime travel, swimming only in visible areas, and maintaining low speeds. Violators of the remaining restrictions could face Class C misdemeanor charges, including fines of up to $1,000 or six months in jail.

Travis County officials credited the reopening to the ongoing cleanup and recovery efforts by county staff, volunteers, and partner agencies.

As of July 20, 2025, Lake Travis was reported to be 90.0% full, following significant rainfall and inflows earlier in the month. The lake reopened fully on July 24th for all recreation, without any restrictions.

== See also ==
- Pedernales River
- Lake Travis High School
