= Lakeway, Texas =

- City
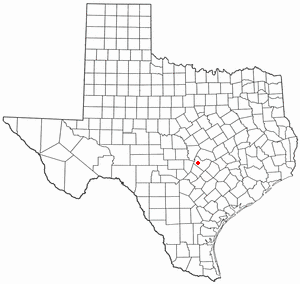
- Location of Lakeway, Texas

- Coordinates: 30°21′55″N 97°58′34″W
- Country: United States
- State: Texas
- County: Travis
- Incorporated: June 1974

Government
  - Type: Council–manager

Area
  - Total: 13.39 sq mi (34.68 km^{2})
  - Land: 12.64 sq mi (32.73 km^{2})
  - Water: 0.75 sq mi (1.95 km^{2})
- Elevation: 830 ft (250 m)

Population (2020)
  - Total: 19,189
  - Density: 1,264.7/sq mi (488.29/km^{2})
- Time zone: UTC-6 (Central (CST))
  - Summer (DST): UTC-5 (CDT)
- ZIP Codes: 78734, 78738, 78669
- Area code: 512
- FIPS code: 48-40984
- GNIS feature ID: 2411612
- Website: www.lakeway-tx.gov

Lakeway is a city in Travis County, Texas, United States. The population was 19,189 at the 2020 census, an increase over the figure of 11,391 tabulated in 2010. The city is located next to Lake Travis. It is an exurb in Greater Austin.

== Geography ==
Lakeway is located 16 miles (26 km) west of Austin.

Hurst Creek runs directly through Lakeway and empties into Lake Travis, directly north of Lakeway.

According to Lakeway's GIS Analyst, the city has a total area of 13.37 square miles (21.51 km), of which 13.07 square miles (15.0 km^{2}) is land and 0.3 square mile (0.7 km^{2}) (4.45%) is water.

== History ==
The town of Lakeway was founded on the site of a 2,700-acre ranch owned by Houston oilman and rancher Jack (Jake) Josey. In early 1962, three Houston businessmen associated with the Gulfmont Hotel Company—G. Flint Sawtelle, John H. Crooker Jr., and Lee Blocker—obtained a sixty-day option to purchase the land and plan a hotel and resort community. The name Lakeway was a natural sequel to Gulfmont's Fairway Motor Hotel in McAllen, Texas, so named because it overlooked the fairway of a golf course. Construction of the hotel began in October 1962 and the grand opening was July 12, 1963. Around the same time, the Lakeway Land Company was formed, with Flint Sawtelle as president, for the development of real estate. In June 1974, a substantial majority of resident and nonresident property owners voted to incorporate with the consent of the city of Austin, and the 1,200-acre village of Lakeway resulted.

== Demographics ==
Historical population
Census	Pop.	Note	%±
1980	790		—
1990	4,044		411.9%
2000	8,002		97.9%
2010	11,391		42.4%
2020	19,189		68.5%
2025 (est.)	19,027		−0.8%
U.S. Decennial Census

=== 2020 census ===
As of the 2020 census, Lakeway had a population of 19,189. The median age was 48.1 years. 22.2% of residents were under the age of 18 and 24.2% of residents were 65 years of age or older. For every 100 females there were 92.6 males, and for every 100 females age 18 and over there were 89.2 males age 18 and over.

There were 7,535 households in Lakeway, of which 32.4% had children under the age of 18 living in them. Of all households, 65.1% were married-couple households, 10.7% were households with a male householder and no spouse or partner present, and 20.8% were households with a female householder and no spouse or partner present. About 20.7% of all households were made up of individuals and 12.0% had someone living alone who was 65 years of age or older.

There were 8,314 housing units, of which 9.4% were vacant. The homeowner vacancy rate was 2.5% and the rental vacancy rate was 10.4%.

99.7% of residents lived in urban areas, while 0.3% lived in rural areas.

Racial composition as of the 2020 census
Race	Number	Percent
White	15,527	80.9%
Black or African American	267	1.4%
American Indian and Alaska Native	93	0.5%
Asian	981	5.1%
Native Hawaiian and Other Pacific Islander	14	0.1%
Some other race	322	1.7%
Two or more races	1,985	10.3%
Hispanic or Latino (of any race)	1,970	10.3%

=== 2010 census ===
In the city, the population was spread out, with 24.7% under the age of 18, 3.5% from 18 to 24, 26.8% from 25 to 44, 28.4% from 45 to 64, and 16.5% who were 65 years of age or older. The median age was 43 years. For every 100 females, there were 95.2 males. For every 100 females age 18 and over, there were 90.9 males.

The median income for a household in the city was $86,862, and the median income for a family was $94,266. Males had a median income of $70,211 versus $38,879 for females. The per capita income for the city was $45,765. About 1.8% of families and 3.1% of the population were below the poverty line, including 4.0% of those under age 18 and 3.3% of those age 65 or over.

== Education ==
=== Primary and secondary schools ===
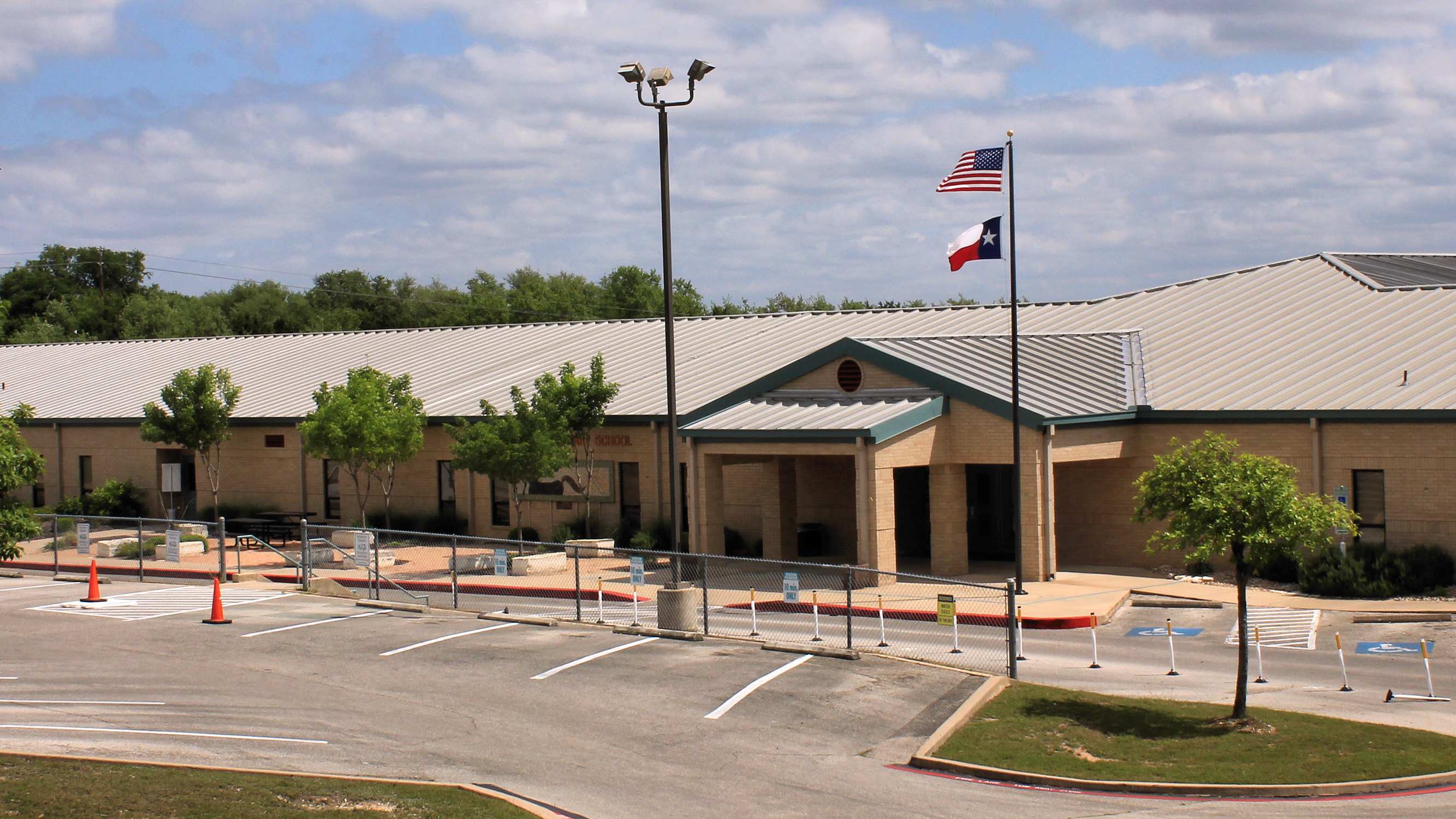
Lakeway Elementary School

The City of Lakeway is served by the Lake Travis Independent School District (LTISD). In this district there are six elementary schools: Bee Cave Elementary School, Lake Pointe Elementary School, Lake Travis Elementary School, Lakeway Elementary School, Rough Hollow Elementary School, and Serene Hills Elementary School. Three middle schools, Hudson Bend Middle School, Lake Travis Middle School, and Bee Cave Middle School, are a part of LTISD. All of LTISD is zoned to Lake Travis High School.

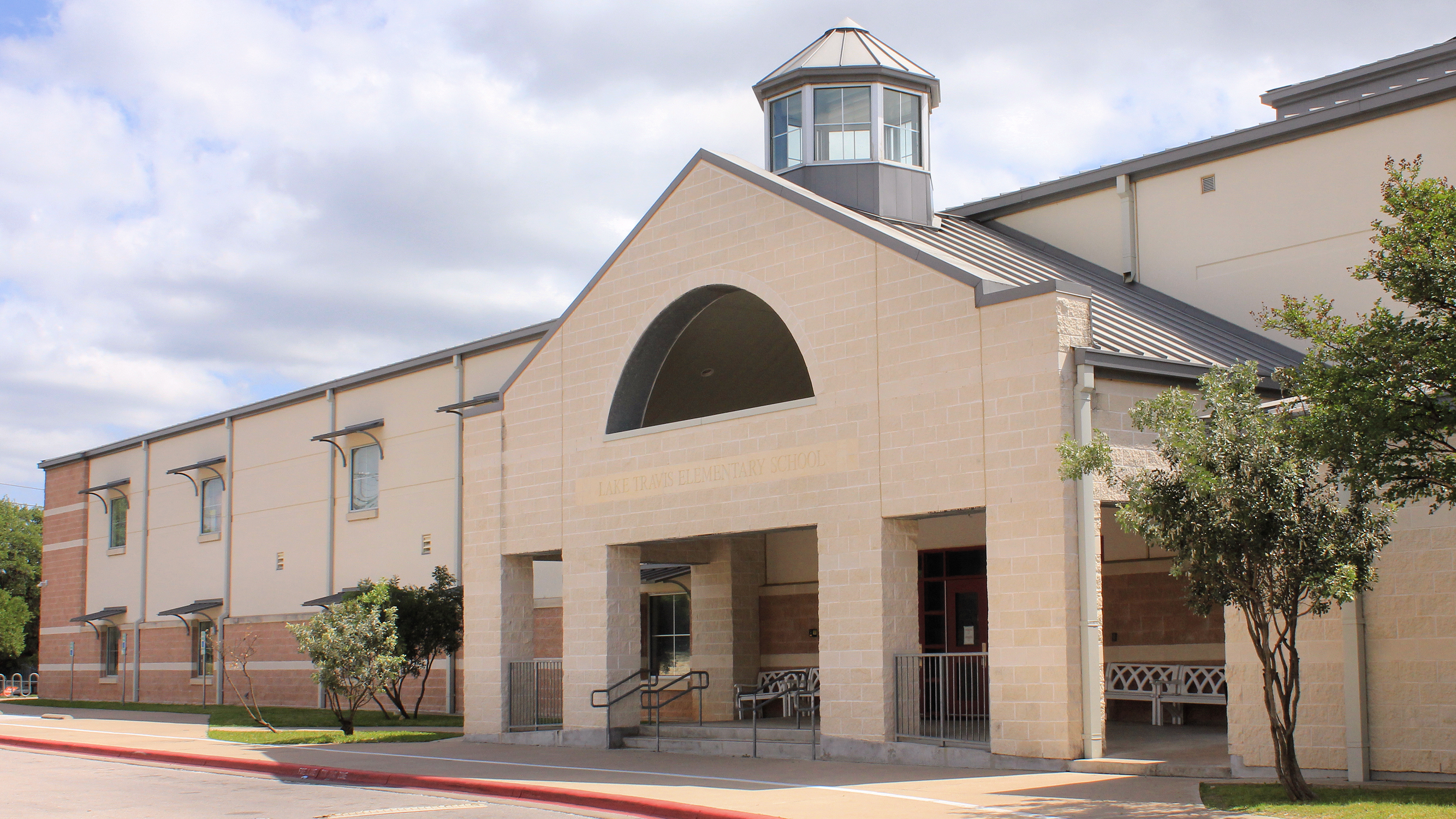
Lake Travis Elementary School

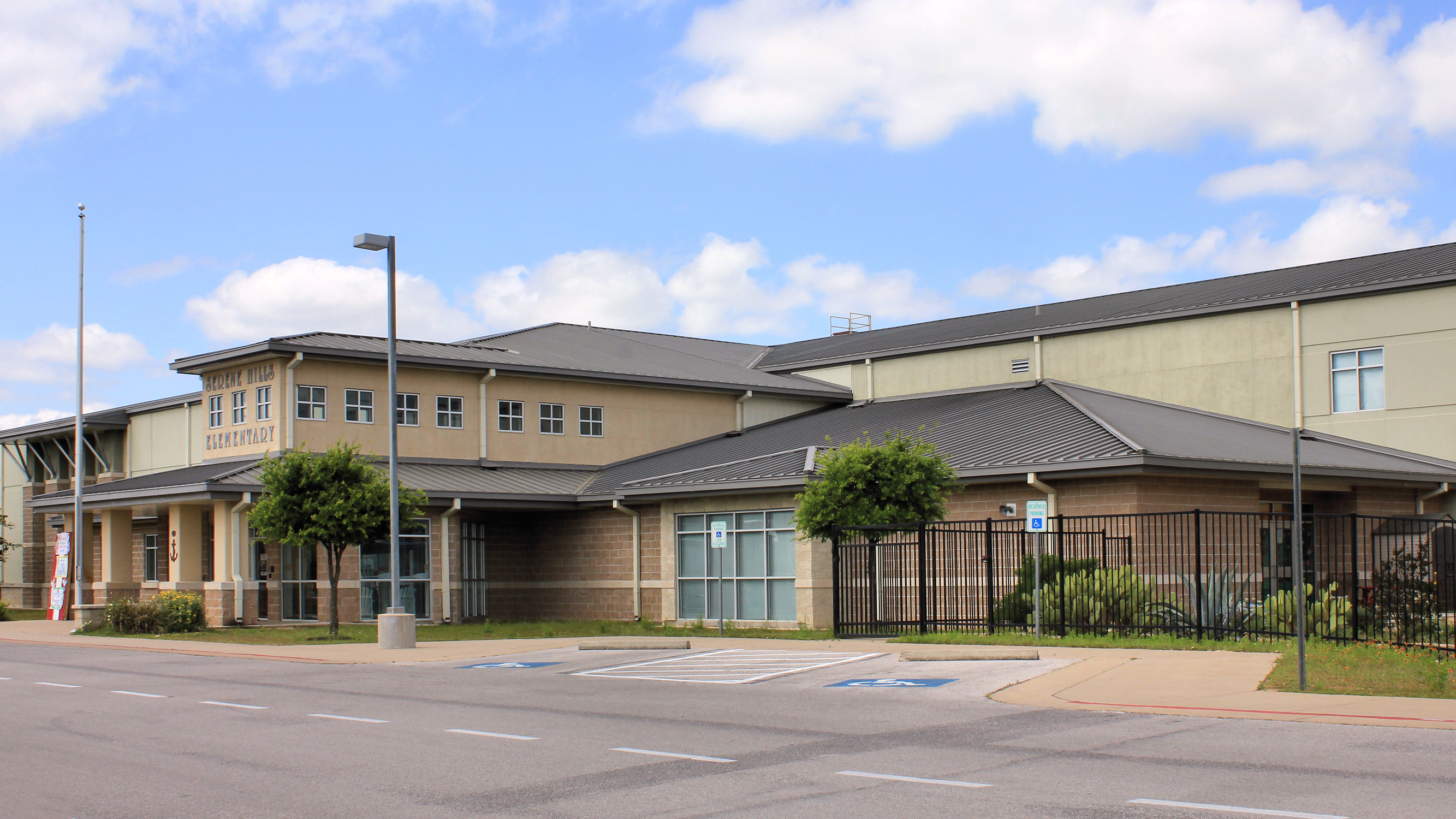
Serene Hills Elementary School

=== Public library ===
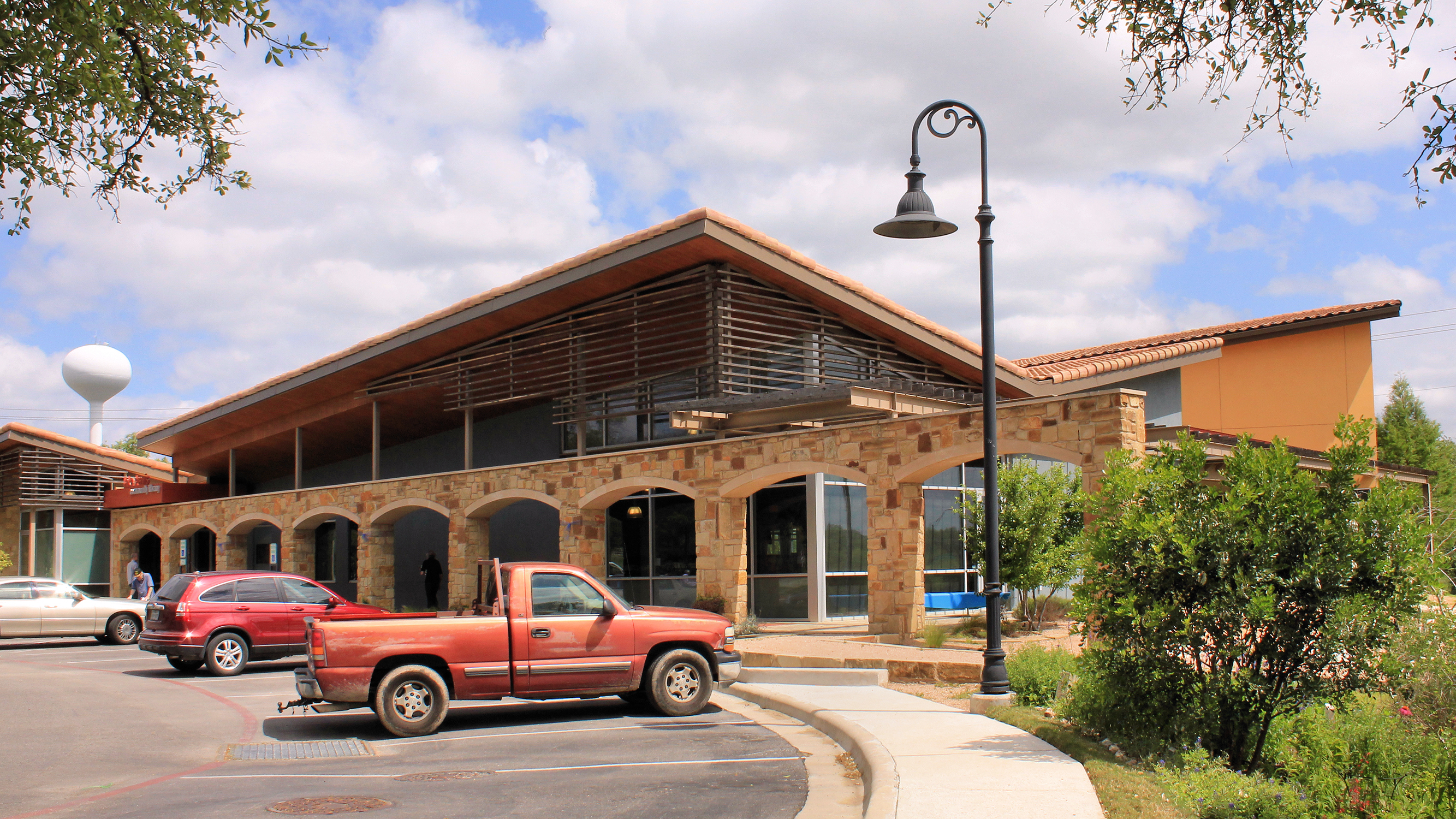
Lake Travis Community Library

The Lake Travis Community Library (LTCL) in Lakeway serves the community. The building, with 11,000 square feet (1,000 m^{2}) of space, is located in the Tuscan Village area. It originally opened in Lake Travis High School in 1985. Area voters approved the creation of the library district serving the library was created in May 2004. Haythem Dawlett donated the land for the library in March 2011, and the library moved into the current location in February 2013. In November 2024, LTCL opened a second location, known as the West location, in neighboring Spicewood, Texas.

== Infrastructure ==
=== Hospital ===
The Baylor Scott & White Medical Center - Lakeway includes a 200,000-square-foot (19,000 m^{2}) general hospital off Ranch to Market Road 620.

The 54-acre (220,000 m^{2}) development will include:

- 244,000 square feet (22,700 m^{2}) of medical office space
- a rehabilitation hospital with about 85 patient rooms for long-term acute care
- convalescence and full-service therapy
- an elder-care facility for 80 to 100 patients
- 30,000 square feet (2,800 m^{2}) of retail and restaurant space
- an extended-stay hotel with 60 to 90 suites
- and structured parking surrounded by amenities such as trails

The First Portion of the Medical Center that opened was the hospital, which opened in April 2012 with 100 beds. The hospital will be able to expand to 200 beds. It will have an imaging center with an MRI, CT scanner and X-ray machine; a 16-bed emergency room and heliport; lab services; and an outpatient clinic. It will also include facilities for cardiovascular treatment, orthopedics, pediatrics, obstetrics and gynecology, general surgery, nephrology and dialysis, and an infusion center.

== See also ==
- The murders of John Goosey and Stacy Barnett (West Campus murders)
