= Saffold Dam =

- U.S. National Register of Historic Places
- Texas State Antiquities Landmark
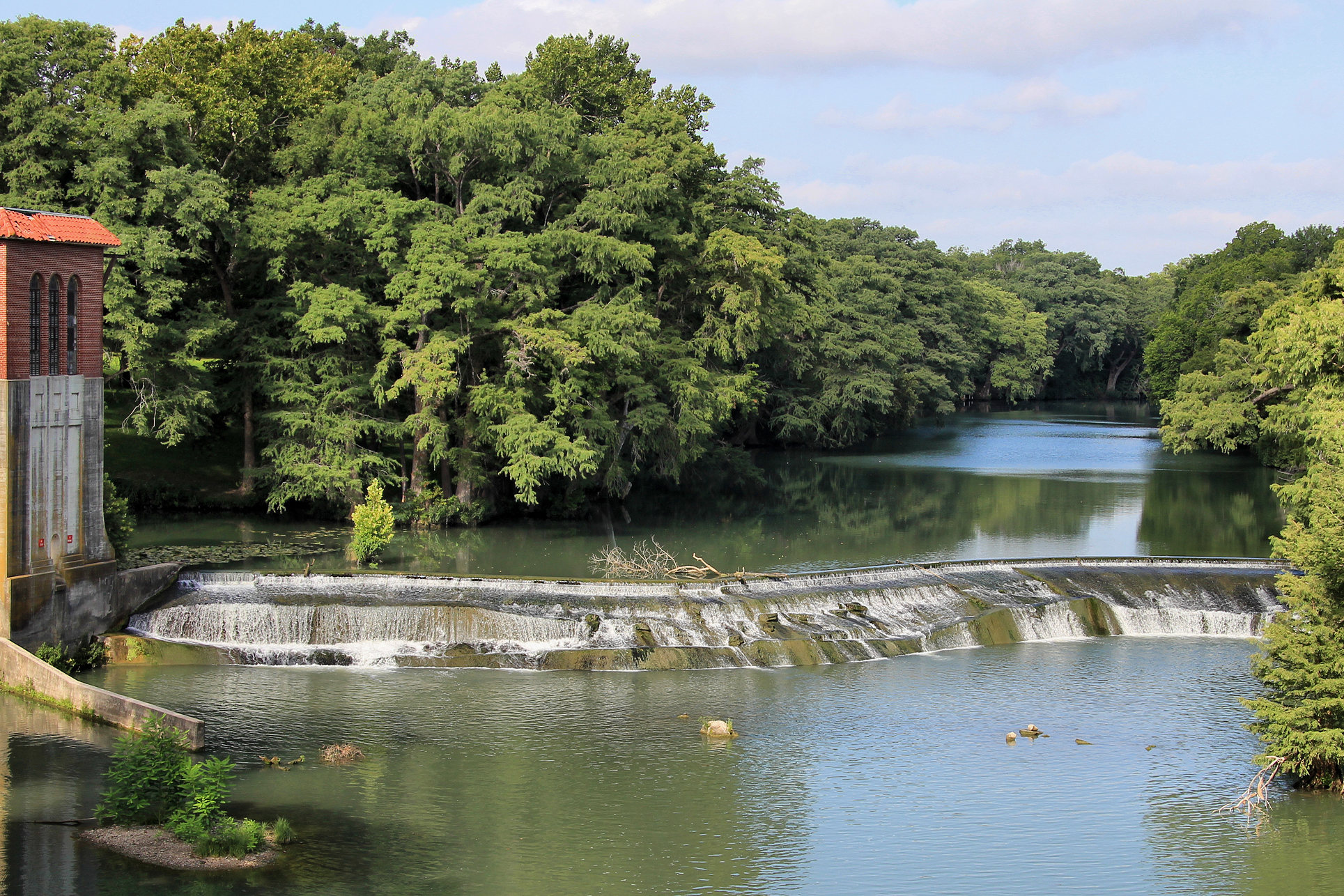
- Saffold Dam in 2013

- Location within Texas Location within the United States
- Location: Off SH 123, Seguin, Texas
- Coordinates: 29°33′3″N 97°58′12″W
- Area: less than one acre
- Built: 1853
- NRHP reference No.: 79002950
- TSAL No.: 300

Significant dates
- Added to NRHP: November 15, 1979
- Designated TSAL: May 28, 1981

Saffold Dam at the Flores Crossing is a dam and man-made waterfall in the city of Seguin, Texas. Named for William Saffold, a Civil War veteran, a major landowner and local merchant. The dam was listed on the National Register of Historic Places on November 15, 1979.

This dam began as a natural outcropping in the riverbed. After Henry Troell bought the mill, the dam was further built up over the years. In 1895, Troell installed hydroelectric generators to power his mill and the town. Then in 1907 he sold the dam and power plant to the City of Seguin, which owns them today.

The low but wide dam forms a graceful S curve, a rare structure for a dam. It is a unique design on the Guadalupe River, and perhaps in Texas. The dam we see today was built as part of Max Starcke Park, designed by Robert Hugman, the father of the San Antonio River Walk. The dam/waterfall, like the rest of the original section of the park, was built by the National Youth Administration, to Hugman's plans. The park was dedicated in 1938, the town's centennial.

Saffold Dam is located on the west side of Texas State Highway 123 Business, about 10 blocks south of downtown Seguin. One side borders Max Starcke Park and the city's water works; the other side has the abandoned power plant.

== Early history ==
The site lies in pecan bottoms used for thousands of years by the indigenous paleo-Indian hunter-gatherers, as evidenced by recent finds near the location. Near 1000 relics (Note: in total including all items found; bifaces, spearpoints, various chips, knives, etc.) were discovered in a single day while moving soil during routine yard maintenance. The site has been registered as a Paleo-Indian Archeological site and is the home of the Guadalupe Bi-face. An archaeological dig continues.

The Flores Crossing was a low rapids over a natural rock outcropping and gravel banks that created a ford across the Guadalupe River. In 1838 Flores established his ranch here on the south side of the river, across from Seguin. Being one of the larger operating ranches of the time, it was visited by German naturalist and geologist Ferdinand von Roemer in 1846. The beauty and clarity of the river and ford were described in his works, Die Kreidebildungen von Texas and ihre organischen Einschlüsse (1852).

The dam was named for Civil War veteran William Saffold. His father, Bird Saffold, came from Georgia and bought the property here in 1853 from Manuel N. Flores, a veteran of the battle of San Jacinto, and the brother-in-law of Juan Seguin, for whom the town is named.

In 1865, William Saffold built a home here on his extensive lands and became a successful businessman, operating a store near this location. He soon established a small mill, which was built in the style typical of this region, during the second half of the 19th century. From the second-story porch of his home, he could see the natural dam that he began to improve by adding boulders where possible. That way, dammed-up water rushed through the mill race with a stronger force to power his gristmill.

In the 1870s, the crossing below the dam was known as the Saffold Crossing, and it was used by several herds as part of the cattle drives heading north.

The dam was further improved after it was purchased by Henry Troell in the 1880s. Troell added more rock to further heighten the dam, raising the water level in order to provide sufficient power for a cotton gin. He added hydroelectric capabilities in 1895, which provided the first pumped water and electricity system to the city. It was one of the first hydroelectric plants in Texas.

Troell later moved his mill operations, and in 1907, the City of Seguin, assisted by the efforts of Ferdinand C. Weinert, bought Troell's property to further develop the river's hydroelectricity.

== 20th-century history ==
National Youth Administration workers covered the rock dam with concrete while constructing Max Starcke Park, dedicated in 1938. The park and dam were designed by Robert H.H. Hugman, the architect of the River Walk in San Antonio. (A somewhat similar dam on the River Walk was later lost to an expansion project.)

The impounded river behind the dam carries the official name of Max Starcke Reservoir. The small reservoir is commonly called Lake Seguin or Lake Starcke, in the style of other nearby reservoirs on the Guadalupe River; Lake Dunlap, Lake McQueeney, and Lake Placid.

The power plant has not operated for some years, though much of the machinery remains. The city leased the abandoned building for a destination restaurant named The Power Plant Grill, as well as a tube launching venue for floating the river.

== See also ==
National Register of Historic Places listings in Guadalupe County, Texas
