= Ugra =

Ugra may refer to:

- A Rudra (forms of the Hindu deity Shiva)
- Ugra, the pen-name of the Indian writer Pandey Becham Sharma (1907–1967)
- Ugra (Oka), a river in Russia, tributary of the Oka
- Ugra, a small river in Romania, tributary of the Trotuș
- Ugra, the Hungarian name for Ungra Commune, Brașov County, Romania
- Ugra, a Hungarian name for Ogra Commune, Mureș County, Romania
- Ugra (inhabited locality), several inhabited localities in Russia
- Ugra National Park, a national park in Russia
- Ugra-class submarine tenders, the NATO classification of a ship from the Soviet Navy
- Upper Guadalupe River Authority, a government-owned corporation in Texas, United States
- Ugraparipṛcchā Sūtra, also known as The Inquiry of Ugra
- Unitized Group Ration - A (UGR-A), a type of American military ration

== See also ==
- Yugra, term for people of the Ural Mountains
- Ugramm, a 2014 Indian-Kannada language action thriller film
- Ugram (film), a 2023 Indian Telugu-language action thriller film
