= Nicholas Fagan =

Early settler of Texas (c. 1785 – 1852)

Nicholas Fagan (abt 1785–1852) was a prominent figure in the history of Refugio County, Texas, known for his contributions as a blacksmith, rancher, Texas patriot, and pioneer during the early 19th century. He hoisted Texas' first flag of independence, Dimmitt's "bloody arm flag," after the signing of the Goliad Declaration of Independence. Nicholas was spared execution twice, once at Refugio and once at Goliad, by José de Urrea's men due to his close friendship with Carlos de la Garza, a Captain in the Mexican army.

Nicholas Fagan hoisted the Goliad Flag on a log cut of sycamore in celebration of the signing of the Goliad Declaration of Independence.

== Early life ==
Fagan was most likely born in County Westmeath, Ireland, but most sources site County Meath. His parents were James and Annie Fagan. He grew up alongside cousin, General Edward Pakenham from Castlepollard, County Westmeath, who died in the Battle of New Orleans. He immigrated to the United States in 1816 or 1817 with his first wife, Kate Connelly, and his daughter, Annie Fagan. Arriving originally in New York, the family moved through Philadelphia, Pittsburgh, Cincinnati, and St. Louis. During this time period, Kate and Nicholas had another child, Mary. The family moved to an area north of St. Louis for three years, having a third child, John, in 1823.

Devoutly Catholic, the family moved to New Orleans so the children could attend a Catholic church around 1823. The family traveled by flat boat down the Mississippi river with all their possessions. Soon after arriving, they contracted yellow fever and Kate died. A good Samaritan, Madame Duplice, took the children into her home and cared for them for some time. Meanwhile, Nicholas met a widow, Catherine Hanselman Balsch, originally from Stuttgart. They were married in New Orleans in 1824. The couple had two daughters and a son, before "Texas fever" struck Nicholas to move to Texas.

== Texas pioneer ==
Fagan went to Copano, Texas, to scout the area for water, building materials, and an appropriate farmstead location prior to bringing his family. He found a suitable location on the south bank of the San Antonio River in what is now Refugio County, then retrieved his family.

Fagan, his family, and two other families arrived in Texas on the ship Panoma. A Captain named Prietta had secured a special permit for the families to land at Copano. The Fagans were among the earliest settlers of Power and Hewetson's Colony, which was established with the purpose of settling the sparsely populated Mexican frontier with Irish Catholics.

Fagan soon met Carlos de la Garza, whose ranch was across the river and a few miles to the west. de la Garza provided some animals to Fagan to help him get started and informed him of a wrecked Spanish barkentine 20 miles away with good lumber for building a house. Fagan built his ranch house out of the wrecked ship.

Fagan built the first mill in the area and provided flour, corn meal, and masa for the local ranches. The family lived amongst the local Karankawa people and had generally friendly relations before the Texas Revolution. The Karankawas shared beer with Fagan's children, harvested crops, and attended Annie Fagan's wedding.

On August 4, 1834, five years after establishing his homestead, Fagan received his land grant of 9,538 acres, part of the Power and Hewetson Colony.

== Texas Revolution ==
The Fagans lived peacefully alongside their native and Mexican neighbors until the Texas Revolution brought an influx of newcomers, including some undesirable individuals, to the region. Fagan emerged as a leader of the settlement. Like James Power, Fagan strongly opposed Antonio López de Santa Anna's efforts to centralize the Mexican government and deny Texas the right to self-governance.

Fagan sent his wife and children to Louisiana and volunteered as quartermaster with Philip Dimmitt's company in the Texian Army, fighting with distinction throughout the war. His oldest son, John, also joined the army. Fagan served in Dimmitt's company from October 9, 1835, to January 20, 1836, as well as under Ira Westover and Hugh Frazer in different periods.

Fagan became known as the "Angel of Refugio" after providing his whole corn crop and several hundred cattle at the Texan army's disposition to feed the starving people of Refugio.

Fagan and John fought in the Battle of Lipantitlan on November 4, 1835. Fagan then traveled to Goliad to secure the fort under Dimmitt. While there, the Goliad Declaration of Independence was written and signed. In celebration, Dimmitt had designed a new flag, the Goliad or Bloody Arm flag. Fagan cut a sycamore and raised the flag up from the fort, where it was quickly shot at from outside the walls.

=== Battle of Refugio ===
Urrea marched his men toward Refugio from San Patricio. James Fannin ordered Amon B. King to head to Refugio to protect the townspeople. Fagan and 28 others volunteered to go with King. They ran into an overwhelming force of the Mexican army along the Aransas River. They retreated toward the refugees to expedite their escape. Fagan and others formed a shield for the families, fighting and falling back while being shot at by Urrea's men. After getting all of the refugees in the old mission at Refugio, King sent Fagan and others on a scouting mission. Shortly after leaving, he ran into a hundred rancheros and Karankawa led by de la Garza and was forced to surrender. Santa Anna ordered the execution of all rebels, but de la Garza intervened and released the Mexican colonists and Fagan. de la Garza instructed Fagan to return to his ranch. From there, he headed to Goliad.

Shortly afterward, the remaining men and King attempted to escape from the mission. King and his men were unable to fight due to wet gunpowder. They were met by de la Garza's forces. They were taken prisoner, forced to bury the Mexican dead, then executed.

=== Battle of Coleto ===
Fannin was ordered to retreat by Sam Houston from Presidio La Bahía at Goliad, but delayed this action. During a hasty retreat, the Texians became surrounded by Urrea's men near Coleto Creek. Fagan and his son fought in the battle under Frazer. After seeing that victory was not possible, Fannin surrendered. Fagan and 283 other men were taken captive and marched back to Goliad.

=== Goliad Massacre ===
Knowing Santa Anna's orders to Urrea to execute all prisoners, de la Garza developed a plan to help him escape. de la Garza had his men slaughter a cow and give a side of beef to Fagan to carry for them. They sent him to an orchard and told him to wait. While waiting there alone, he heard the execution of the prisoners. de la Garza also saved John and other neighbors.

Nicholas Fagan went back to the Presidio after the Mexican army had left to look for survivors. He found William Lockhart Hunter alive, but badly wounded. He cared for the man and carried him, eventually to the ranch of Margaret Wright. There he left him in the river bottom where she could tend to his wounds and feed him.

Fagan then left to meet Houston and his army. Along the way he met Deaf Smith, who informed him about the victory at San Jacinto and the end of the war.

After the war ended, a funeral ceremony was held at Goliad for all of Fannin's men. Fagan and John were two of the honorary pallbearers.

== Post-Revolution ==
Fagan, Thomas O'Connor, de la Garza, and others formed a local militia called Power and Cameron's Spy Company from 1836 to 1838. After this, they organized in a local San Antonio River militia under John J. Tumlinson and fought in many raids and expeditions with Mexican bandits and Comanches.

In 1838, a large contingent of Native Americans from Mexico invaded the San Antonio River bottom, killing several settlers. The Fagans joined a posse that intercepted the raiders. A large battle was fought, and Fagan, John, and O'Connor were nearly killed.

On September 1, 1841, Refugio was raided by a group of Mexicans led by a man named Ortegon seeking revenge. Every able-bodied man was seized and taken to Mexico. During this forced march, Power was captured and held as a prisoner. The town was pillaged, while all provisions, clothing, and supplies were either destroyed or stolen.

Upon receiving news of the attack, Fagan and his neighbors took supplies to the affected families. They transported the women and children back to their San Antonio River ranches. Many stayed with the Fagans until the captured men were released. Some weren't released until years later. In recognition of this act of kindness, Fagan was again hailed as the savior of Refugio.

In 1852, a band of Karankawas began raiding homesteads and stealing cattle and horses. A posse was formed with Fagan, sons John and William (born 1828), O'Connor, de la Garza, and others. They surprised the band of Karankawas and fought at Hynes Bay. The Karankawas were driven back to Mexico, never to return.

== Later life ==
After the war, Nicholas and his family returned to the ranch. His second daughter Mary Fagan married Thomas O'Connor in October 1838 and Nicholas provided them with cattle which served as the nucleus for the future vast O'Connor herds. He had two more children. His final child, Peter Henry Fagan, who took over Nicholas Fagan's estate and continued his ranching operations, was born in 1843. Nicholas Fagan died on his ranch on August 30, 1852. His wife, Catherine, died four years later on June 26, 1856.

== Historical marker ==
A state historical marker was placed in the Nicholas Fagan Memorial Cemetery near his original homestead. It reads as follows:

"Nicholas Fagan, came to Texas and settled in Power's Colony in 1829.

A private in Fraser's Refugio Company at the Battle of Coleto.

He was saved from the massacre through the intervention of Mexican colonial friends.

Erected by the State of Texas 1956."
