= Dunlap Lake =

Dunlap Lake may refer to:

- Dunlap Lake (Edwardsville, Illinois)
- Lake Dunlap, a reservoir on the Guadalupe River in Guadalupe County, Texas.
