= Texas Recreational Road 11 =

Highway in Texas

Recreational Road 11

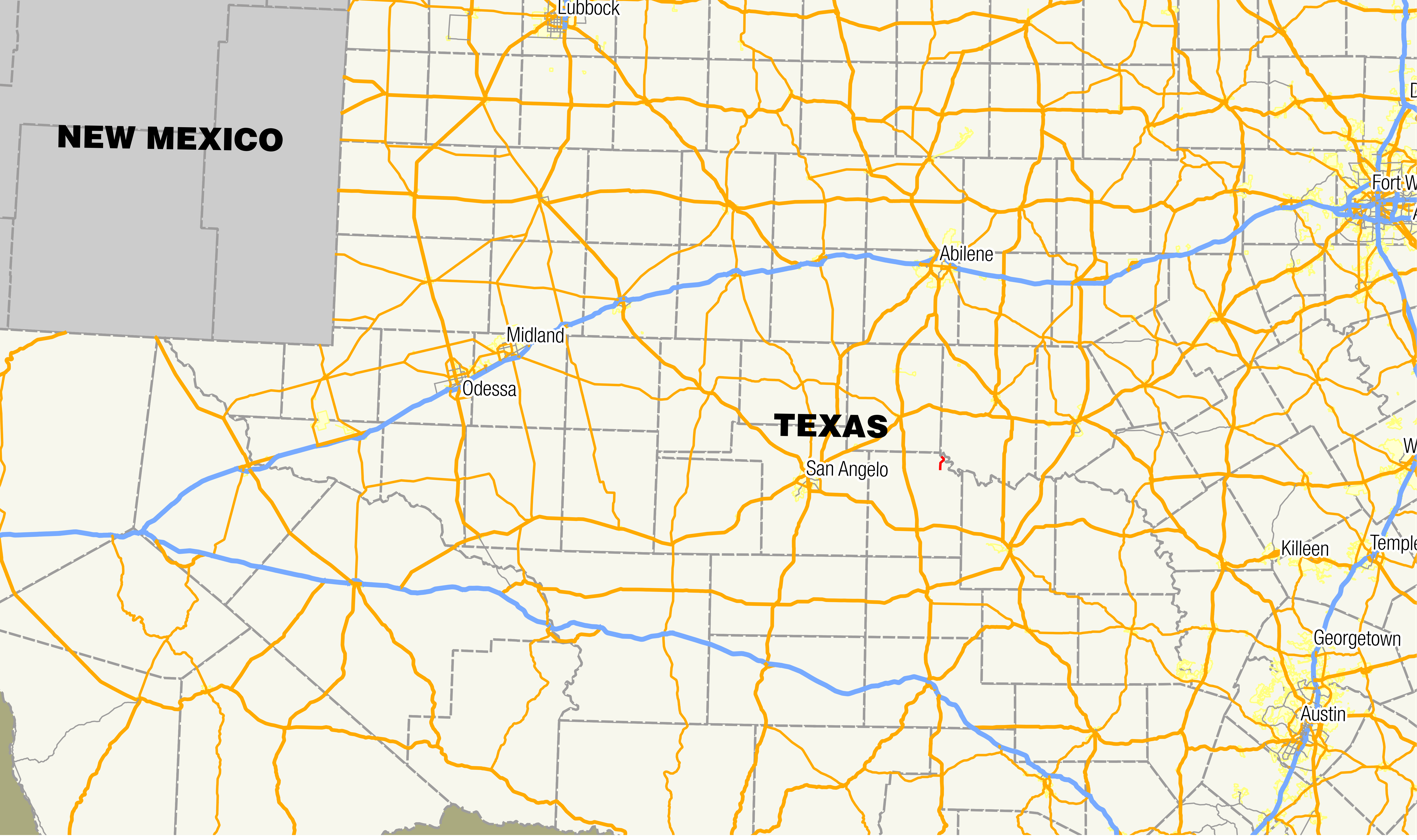

Route information
- Maintained by TxDOT
- Length: 4.251 mi (6.841 km)
- Existed: December 20, 1996–present

Major junctions
- South end: FM 1929
- North end: Concho Park boat ramp at O.H. Ivie Lake

Location
- Country: United States
- State: Texas
- Counties: Concho

Highway system
- Highways in Texas; Interstate; US; State; Former; Toll; Loops; Spurs; FM/RM; Park; Rec
← PR 11	→ SH 12

Recreational Road 11 (RE 11) is a Recreational Road located in Concho County, in the western region of the U.S. state of Texas. The 4.3-mile (6.9 km) long highway connects Farm to Market Road 1929 (FM 1929) to Concho Park and Marina, a public park on O. H. Ivie Lake. The roadway primarily travels through rural agricultural land along a peninsula into the reservoir. Segments of road first appeared in the location of RE 11 around 1940. Portions of the highway were designated as part of Ranch to Market Road 2134 (RM 2134) in 1953, but was removed as part of that highway due to the construction of the O.H. Ivie Reservoir. RE 11 was designated in December 1996.

== Route description ==
RE 11 begins at an at-grade intersection with FM 1929, to the north of a small farm. The roadway proceeds as a two-lane, paved road, traveling northward through rural areas on a large peninsula on the lake. The road continues north, traveling through scrub land before it intersects the Ray Stoker Jr. Highway, and bends slightly northeast for a short distance. After continuing north, the roadway bends northeast, as it intersects the former route of RM 2134. The highway intersects a small road leading to a residential community on the lake, before continuing northeast, where it intersects County Road 4763 (CR 4763), which leads to a small residential area. It turns north and continues for a short distance, after which the highway bends northwest, and proceeds to its northern terminus, a boat-launch ramp on the coast of the lake. The highway is maintained by the Texas Department of Transportation (TxDOT).

== History ==
Farm to Market Road 2134
- Location: O.H. Ivie Reservoir
- Length: 1.405 mi (2.261 km)
- Existed: October 1, 1955–1990

The first segments of road appeared in the location of what would become RE 11 by 1940. The southern road segment began at an at-grade intersection, near the location of RE 11, and traveled northward, before traveling slightly westward and terminating at a dead end. The road was graded and drained, and had a gravel surface, with a cattle guard near the middle of it. The northern segment of road traveled near the location of RE 11. This road was also graded and drained, and had three cattle guards located along its course. By 1951, a gate had been added to the southern road segment, and the northern segment had several turns straightened and lengthened. On October 28, 1953, RM 2134 was designated from Millersview along a road to the northern segment of what would become RE 11. On August 24, 1955, the highway was designated along the northern segment of road, to the Colorado River. The designation was made official on October 1, 1955.

By 1956, the surface of RM 2134 had been upgraded to stone, and the northern portion had been additionally straightened. On December 1, 1957, FM 2134 was extended northeastward across the Colorado River to the community of Voss. By 1961, the portion designated as RM 2134 had been upgraded to a bituminous surface, made of asphalt and crushed rock. The other road segment had been upgraded to a metal surface. In addition, a new bridge had been constructed along the RM 2134 portion, and it had been straightened generally along the present location of RE 11. In 1985, plans were approved for the construction of the Stacey Reservoir. The construction was finished in 1990, and the lake was instead named the O.H. Ivie Reservoir. The construction of the lake destroyed a large portion of RM 2134, and caused the removal of the highway to FM 1929. RE 11 was designated on its current location on October 31, 1996, and was officially approved on December 20, 1996. The route remains the most recently designated recreational road.

== Major intersections ==
The entire highway is in Concho County.

Location	mi	km	Destinations	Notes
	0.000	0.000	FM 1929	Southern terminus
	1.014	1.632	CR 4763 north	Southern terminus of CR 4763
	3.337	5.370	CR 4763 south	Northern terminus of CR 4763
	4.251	6.841	Concho Recreation Area	Northern terminus
1.000 mi = 1.609 km; 1.000 km = 0.621 mi
