= Anaqua, Texas =

Ghost town in Texas, US

- Ghost town
- Location in Texas
- Coordinates: 28.55222100°N 97.06915630°W
- Country: United States
- State: Texas
- County: Victoria

Anaqua is a settlement in Victoria County, Texas, United States. Named for the anaqua tree, it was described in the writings of Álvar Núñez Cabeza de Vaca as the home of the Yguace Indians and is the only mention of the Yguace; they were believed to be a group of Tonkawa. It is supposedlt the first named place in Texas. By 1820, Carlos de la Garza built a chapel at the location. The area was settled by Anglo people after 1836, who turned it into a trading post. A post office—a box nailed to an anaqua—operated from 1852 to 1919. At its peak in 1890, it had a population of 25. The town declined after the St. Louis, Brownsville and Mexico Railway routed into McFaddin. It is now home to the Anaqua oilfield.
