= Upper Colorado River Authority =

- Abbreviation: UCRA
- Formation: 1935
- Type: Government-owned corporation
- Purpose: Water conservation
- Headquarters: 512 Orient St., San Angelo, Texas, 76903
- Region served: Concho, Coke, Schleicher, and Tom Green Counties in Texas
- Chairperson: Jeffie Roberts
- Main organ: Board of Directors
- Website: http://www.ucratx.org/

The Upper Colorado River Authority or UCRA was created in 1935 by the Texas Legislature as a quasi-governmental entity to manage the Colorado River as a water resource in Tom Green County and Coke County, Texas. The authority has since been extended to include Schleicher County and Concho County. The organization is managed by a nine-person board of directors appointed to six-year terms by the governor of Texas.

The UCRA has served as a lending institution, offering loans to municipalities in its served district for water management projects. The authority also participates in the Clean Rivers Program, and other environmental programs of the state of Texas. In 2008, the UCRA began construction in San Angelo of the Concho River Basin Education and Research Center, which offers educational programs to schoolchildren about water use and conservation.

== Reservoirs ==
The Upper Colorado River Authority does not directly manage or operate any dams. The authority has helped to provide financial and administrative support to other operating authorities to establish three reservoirs on the Upper Colorado River and its tributaries:

- E.V. Spence Reservoir, managed by the Colorado River Municipal Water District
- O.C. Fisher Reservoir, managed by the United States Army Corps of Engineers
- Twin Buttes Reservoir, managed by the City of San Angelo

== See also ==
- Lower Colorado River Authority
- List of Texas river authorities
