= Carlos de la Garza =

Tejano rancher (1807–1882)

- Born: November 04, 1807; Texas
- Died: December 30, 1882 (aged 74–75); Texas
- Occupation: Rancher

Captain Carlos de la Garza (1807–1882), also known as "Don Carlos," was a fourth generation Tejano rancher and entrepreneur in Goliad, Victoria and Refugio counties of Texas. His participation in the Mexican Army leading to the Battle of Coleto was instrumental in the surrender and demise of Colonel James Fannin and the Texian forces.

== Early life ==
Carlos was both a Tejano (Mexican born in Texas, or Tejas) and a Labadeño, or Badeño, (a descendant of a Presidio La Bahía soldier). Born in 1807 at the presidio, to soldier José Antonio de la Garza and his wife Rosalia, the family established a rancho (Mexican ranch) on land owned by Mission La Bahía. Carlos was engaged in the family ranching business (4 Generations) and followed in his father's footsteps by enlisting in the Mexican army. In 1829, he married Tomasita García, with whom he had three children. His Carlos Rancho and his Ferry Crossing at the San Antonio River became a hub for local commerce, as well as a crossroads for several communities of both immigrants and Labadeños.

== Texas Revolution ==
La Bahía translates as "the bay". The Presidio was founded in 1721 by the Viceroyalty of New Spain on the ruins of the failed French Fort Saint Louis near Matagorda Bay. A year later an adjoining mission was established on Garcitas Creek by Franciscan missionaries in an unsuccessful attempt to convert the Karankawa Indians. Both the presidio and the mission were relocated several times. The last move in 1749 was to what is now Goliad. Mission La Bahía was secularized in 1830. According to historian Alonzo Salazar, many Mexican military families such as the Garzas had established ranchos on the mission lands with the expectation that, should mission lands be secularized, the Mexican government would issue titles to existing homesteaders. These longtime homesteaders were passed over by the Spanish and Mexican governments for prominent and wealthier empresarios.

Along the Gulf Coast in what are now the counties of Goliad, Refugio, San Patricio and Victoria, Tejano involvement in events of the Texas revolution were partially influenced by the empresario colonization contracts. Over the objections of Mexican rancheros (ranch owners) in the area without legal titles, Irish immigrants James Power and James Hewetson were granted an empresario colonization contract in 1828 (amended in 1831) to settle four hundred Irish families on secularized land once belonging to Nuestra Señora del Refugio Mission and Mission La Bahía. When Power and Hewetson failed to settle the required number of families, local rancheros were issued titles as colonists of Power and Hewetson. Garza was able to secure title to a league of his own land only as a colonist of these empresarios.

Tejano-Mexican residents of the area were troubled by land speculation of the empresarios, feeling threatened by the influx of the Anglo settlers taking over lands held by their families, many for several generations. With many friends among the settlers, De La Garza opposed revolution on the grounds that it would strain relations between neighbors. Presidio commander James Fannin targeted Carlos Rancho under the suspicion of harboring Mexican spies. Private homes were likewise looted under orders from Fannin. During the events of the Battle of Goliad, rancheros such as Garza offered fleeing Goliad residents food and shelter on their lands.

Many ranchers and citizens in the area wanted retaliation. They subsequently organized the Victoriana Guardes as a coalition of Tejanos and Karankawa Indians, employing the fighting skills of Spanish lancers. Garza was chosen as the captain. As scouts for José de Urrea at the Battle of Coleto, they ran guerilla tactics against Fannin. The Texian surrender at Coleto Creek led to the Palm Sunday Goliad massacre of the captured soldiers. De la Garza, considered and honest broker by both sides, was successful in pleading on behalf of his Anglo neighbors who fought with Fannin in the skirmish, including his friend and neighbor, Nicholas Fagan; their lives were spared by Lt. Colonel José Nicolás de la Portilla. The spirit of his defense was returned in kind by his neighbors after the Texian victory at Battle of San Jacinto. The command to slaughter the prisoners of war came directly from General and President of the Centralist Republic of Mexico, Antonio Lopez de Santa Anna. When Republic of Texas Secretary of War Thomas Jefferson Rusk began reprisals against Mexican Tejanos and Mexican sympathizers, he ordered Garza deported. The order was never successfully carried out due to a defense mounted by Garza's neighbors.

== Later life and death ==
Like many Tejanos, in spite Santa Ana's oppressive rule over Texas, de la Garza believed Texas should remain part of Mexico. However after the Texas Revolution, Garza joined the populist call for the U.S Annexation of Texas in 1845. He realized this would be a help in the rule of law and would give Mexican Tejanos many rights which were being suppressed by the Anglo rule in the Republic of Texas. Carlos Rancho survived an 1845 legal attempt by Louisiana resident Thomas Taylor Williamson to seize the land from Garza.

Garza died at the age of 75 on December 30, 1882, apparently from an old arrow wound received in a fight with thd Karankawa Native Americans, possibly in 1852 at Hynes Bay. The arrow wound crippled him for the remainder of his life. Captain Carlos de la Garza is buried at Carlos Rancho; Tomasita, his wife of 53 years, was later buried next to him. A portion of the old homestead is still owned by descendants.
