= Thomas O'Connor (rancher) =

Irish rancher and landowner (1819-1887)

- Born: c. 1819; County Wexford, Ireland
- Died: October 16, 1887 (aged 67–68); Refugio County, Texas, US
- Resting place: O'Connor Cemetery in Refugio County
- Occupation: Rancher

Thomas O'Connor (c. 1819 – October 16, 1887) was an Irish rancher and landowner from County Wexford, Ireland whose estate was reportedly the largest individual land and cattle holding in Texas at the time of his death.

== Life ==
O'Connor was born in County Wexford, Ireland. In 1834, he sailed with his uncle James Power, who was an empresario, to Texas. Given Power's diplomatic status, the newly formed independent Republic of Mexico granted them access to the country's unpopulated northern lands. On September 28, 1834, the Mexican government granted O'Connor 4,428 acres as a "settler in the Power and Hewetson colony". O'Connor used the property to make saddletrees.

The following year the Texas Revolution broke out. O'Connor was among the first to reinforce Presidio La Bahía, joining the volunteer regiment commanded by Philip Dimmitt. O'Connor was one of the signers of the Goliad Declaration of Independence. He was one of the youngest soldiers who participated in the Battle of San Jacinto, at age 17.

After the revolution, he returned to Refugio County and continued his old trade of saddletrees. He married Mary Fagan in October 1838. Mary's dowry provided by her father, neighbor and fellow Irish rancher, Nicholas Fagan, included Fagan ranch cattle which served as "the nucleus of the vast herds that made Thomas O'Connor one of the largest cattle ranchers in the state." With her cattle and horses, he was able to grow a herd which he eventually sold in 1873 for $140,000. He invested the money into more land and was able to fence in over 500,000 acres in barbed wire and grow a herd of 100,000 cattle.

== Death ==
O'Connor died on October 16, 1887. At the time of his death, his estate was estimated to be worth $4.5 million. His obituary in the San Antonio Express called him "the wealthiest man in Texas and the largest land and cattle owner in the state".

Following his death, his two sons Dennis Martin (1839-1900) and Thomas Marion O'Connor continued to operate the ranch.

As of 2017, his family heirs are the 17th largest private landowners in the United States owning a total of 587,000 acres by the Texas Coastal Plain.
