= Coleto Creek Reservoir =

Reservoir in Fannin, Texas, US

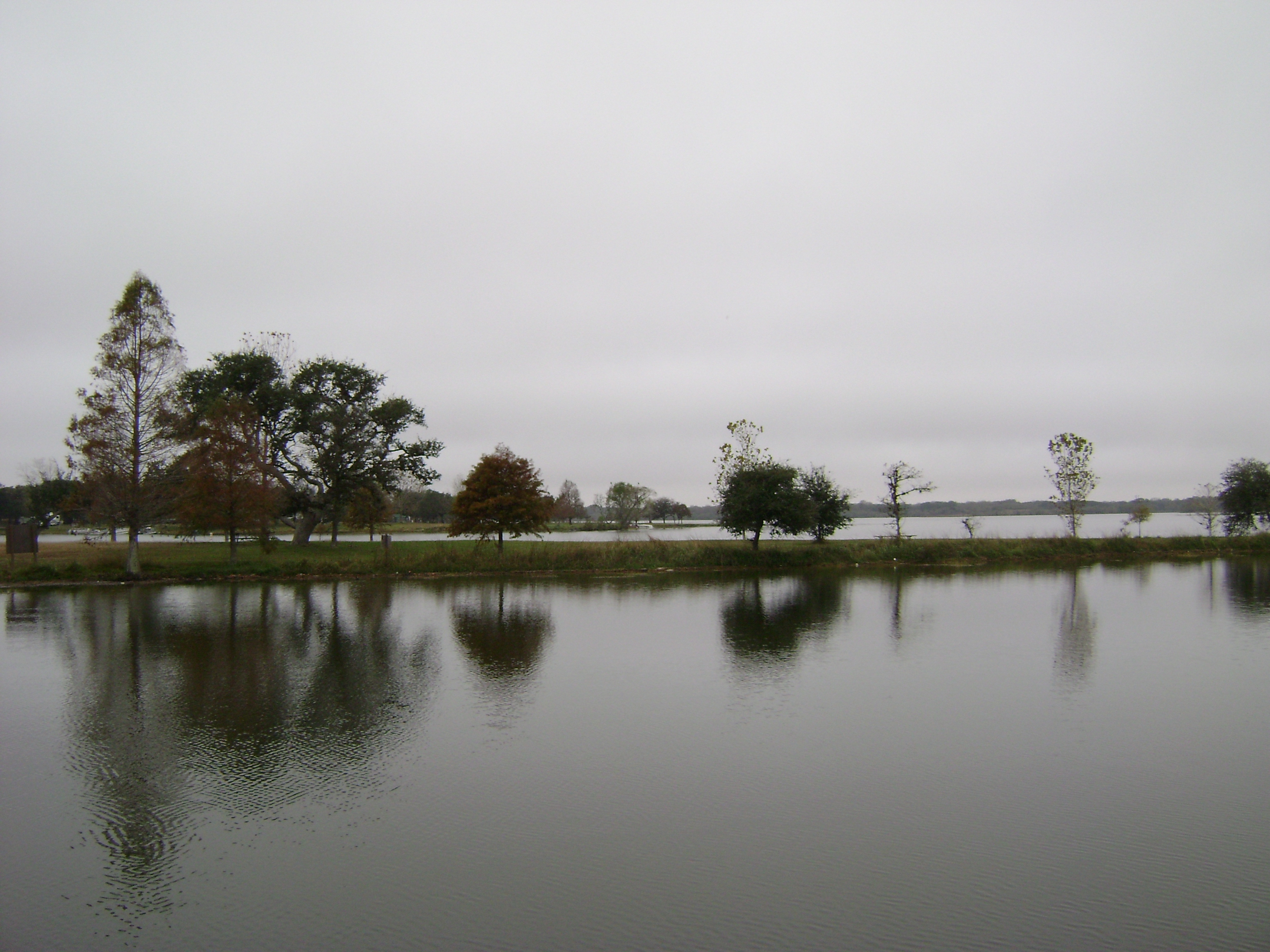

- Location within Texas Location within the United States
- Location: Goliad / Victoria counties, Texas, United States
- Coordinates: 28°43.63′N 97°10.22′W
- Type: Power station cooling pond
- Primary inflows: Coleto Creek and Perdido Creek
- Basin countries: United States
- Surface area: 3,100 acres (1,300 ha)
- Max. depth: 46 ft (14 m)
- Surface elevation: 98 ft (30 m)

Coleto Creek Reservoir is a reservoir on Coleto Creek and Perdido Creek located in Fannin, Texas, 15 miles (24 km) southwest of Victoria. The surface of the lake extends into Victoria and Goliad Counties. The reservoir was formed in 1980 by the construction of a dam by the Guadalupe-Blanco River Authority to provide a power station cooling pond for electric power generation. Coleto Creek Reservoir is a venue for outdoor recreation, including fishing and boating.

== Fish and plant life ==
Coleto Creek Reservoir has been stocked with species of fish intended to improve the utility of the reservoir for recreational fishing. Fish present in the reservoir include white bass, hybrid striped bass, catfish, crappie, sunfish, bluegill, and largemouth bass. Vegetation in the lake includes cattail, pondweed, American lotus, rushes, and hydrilla.

== Recreational uses ==
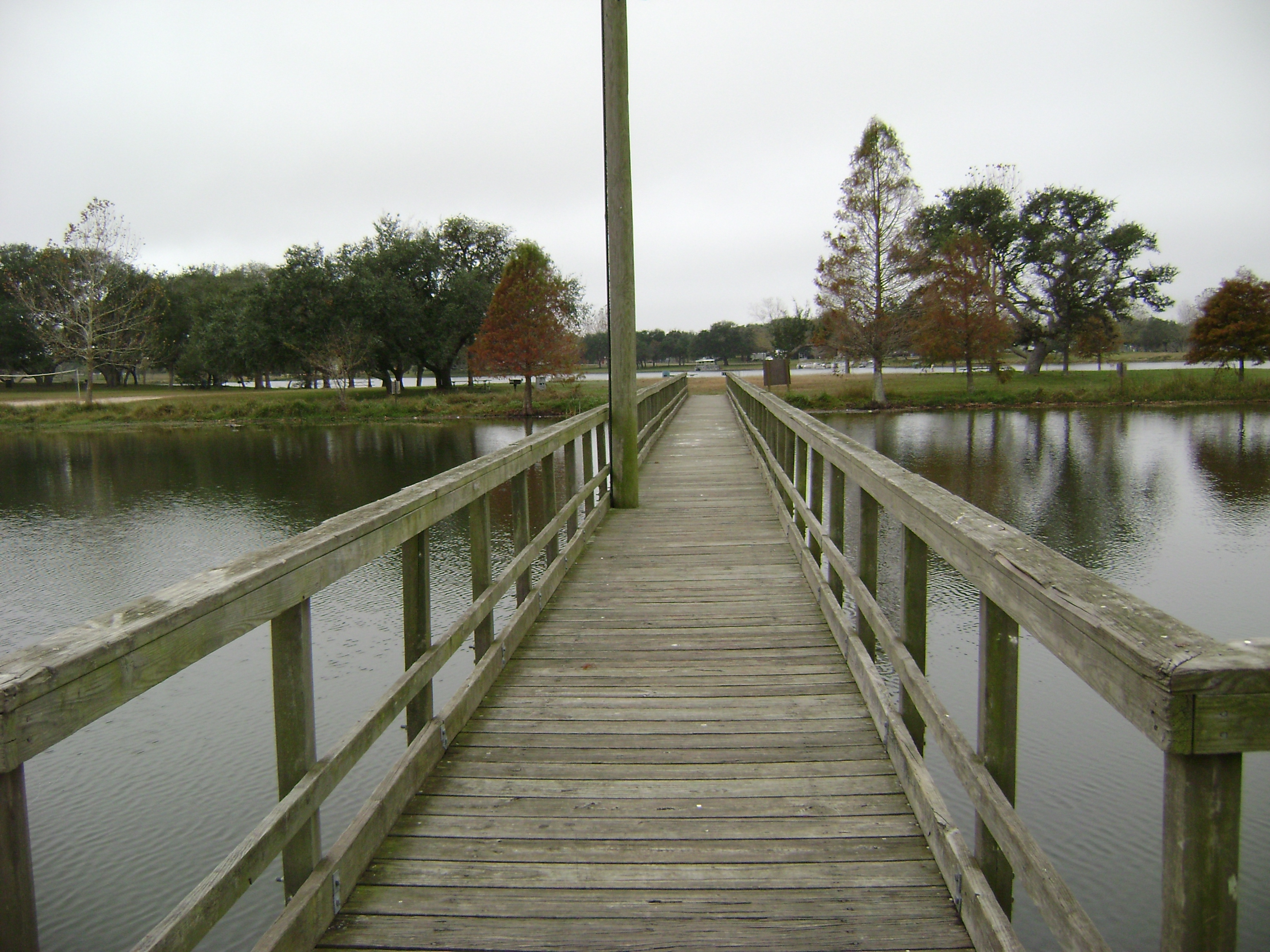
View from the pier

The Guadalupe-Blanco River Authority maintains a public park at the reservoir, with recreational facilities for boating and fishing.

The reservoir has camp sites, picnic areas, cabins, a boat ramp for access to the water, a 200-foot (60 m) lighted fishing pier, a 1.5-mile (2.4 km) hiking path, and restroom facilities.

== Climate ==
According to the Köppen climate classification, the area has a humid subtropical climate, Cfa on climate maps. The hottest temperature recorded at Coleto Creek Reservoir was 109 °F (42.8 °C) on August 19, 2011, while the coldest temperature recorded was 17 °F (−8.3 °C) on February 15–16, 2021 and December 23, 2022.

Climate data for Coleto Creek Reservoir, Texas, 1991–2020 normals, extremes 2003–present
Month	Jan	Feb	Mar	Apr	May	Jun	Jul	Aug	Sep	Oct	Nov	Dec	Year
Record high °F (°C)	92 (33)	90 (32)	95 (35)	95 (35)	98 (37)	106 (41)	103 (39)	109 (43)	104 (40)	97 (36)	89 (32)	84 (29)	109 (43)
Mean maximum °F (°C)	81.4 (27.4)	83.1 (28.4)	86.0 (30.0)	90.1 (32.3)	92.3 (33.5)	97.5 (36.4)	97.6 (36.4)	100.8 (38.2)	97.1 (36.2)	92.7 (33.7)	85.9 (29.9)	80.9 (27.2)	101.9 (38.8)
Mean daily maximum °F (°C)	64.9 (18.3)	68.3 (20.2)	73.5 (23.1)	79.9 (26.6)	85.0 (29.4)	90.1 (32.3)	93.2 (34.0)	94.3 (34.6)	89.7 (32.1)	82.6 (28.1)	73.6 (23.1)	66.9 (19.4)	80.2 (26.8)
Daily mean °F (°C)	53.8 (12.1)	57.4 (14.1)	63.4 (17.4)	69.4 (20.8)	75.9 (24.4)	81.1 (27.3)	83.4 (28.6)	83.8 (28.8)	79.9 (26.6)	71.7 (22.1)	62.4 (16.9)	55.5 (13.1)	69.8 (21.0)
Mean daily minimum °F (°C)	42.7 (5.9)	46.5 (8.1)	53.4 (11.9)	58.9 (14.9)	66.8 (19.3)	72.1 (22.3)	73.6 (23.1)	73.3 (22.9)	70.0 (21.1)	60.9 (16.1)	51.3 (10.7)	44.2 (6.8)	59.5 (15.3)
Mean minimum °F (°C)	27.7 (−2.4)	30.6 (−0.8)	35.1 (1.7)	42.6 (5.9)	53.4 (11.9)	65.9 (18.8)	70.0 (21.1)	70.3 (21.3)	61.0 (16.1)	44.0 (6.7)	34.7 (1.5)	29.9 (−1.2)	25.3 (−3.7)
Record low °F (°C)	18 (−8)	17 (−8)	27 (−3)	37 (3)	44 (7)	61 (16)	65 (18)	65 (18)	50 (10)	35 (2)	28 (−2)	17 (−8)	17 (−8)
Average precipitation inches (mm)	2.54 (65)	1.60 (41)	2.33 (59)	2.14 (54)	3.85 (98)	3.20 (81)	2.72 (69)	2.56 (65)	3.99 (101)	3.36 (85)	2.39 (61)	2.55 (65)	33.23 (844)
Average snowfall inches (cm)	0.0 (0.0)	0.0 (0.0)	0.0 (0.0)	0.0 (0.0)	0.0 (0.0)	0.0 (0.0)	0.0 (0.0)	0.0 (0.0)	0.0 (0.0)	0.0 (0.0)	0.0 (0.0)	0.2 (0.51)	0.2 (0.51)
Average precipitation days (≥ 0.01 in)	9.3	8.5	8.2	6.2	7.3	7.7	8.8	6.3	10.0	6.8	6.7	8.2	94.0
Average snowy days (≥ 0.1 in)	0.0	0.0	0.0	0.0	0.0	0.0	0.0	0.0	0.0	0.0	0.0	0.1	0.1
Source 1: NOAA
Source 2: National Weather Service (mean maxima/minima 2006–2020)
