= E.V. Spence Reservoir =

Artificial lake in Texas, US

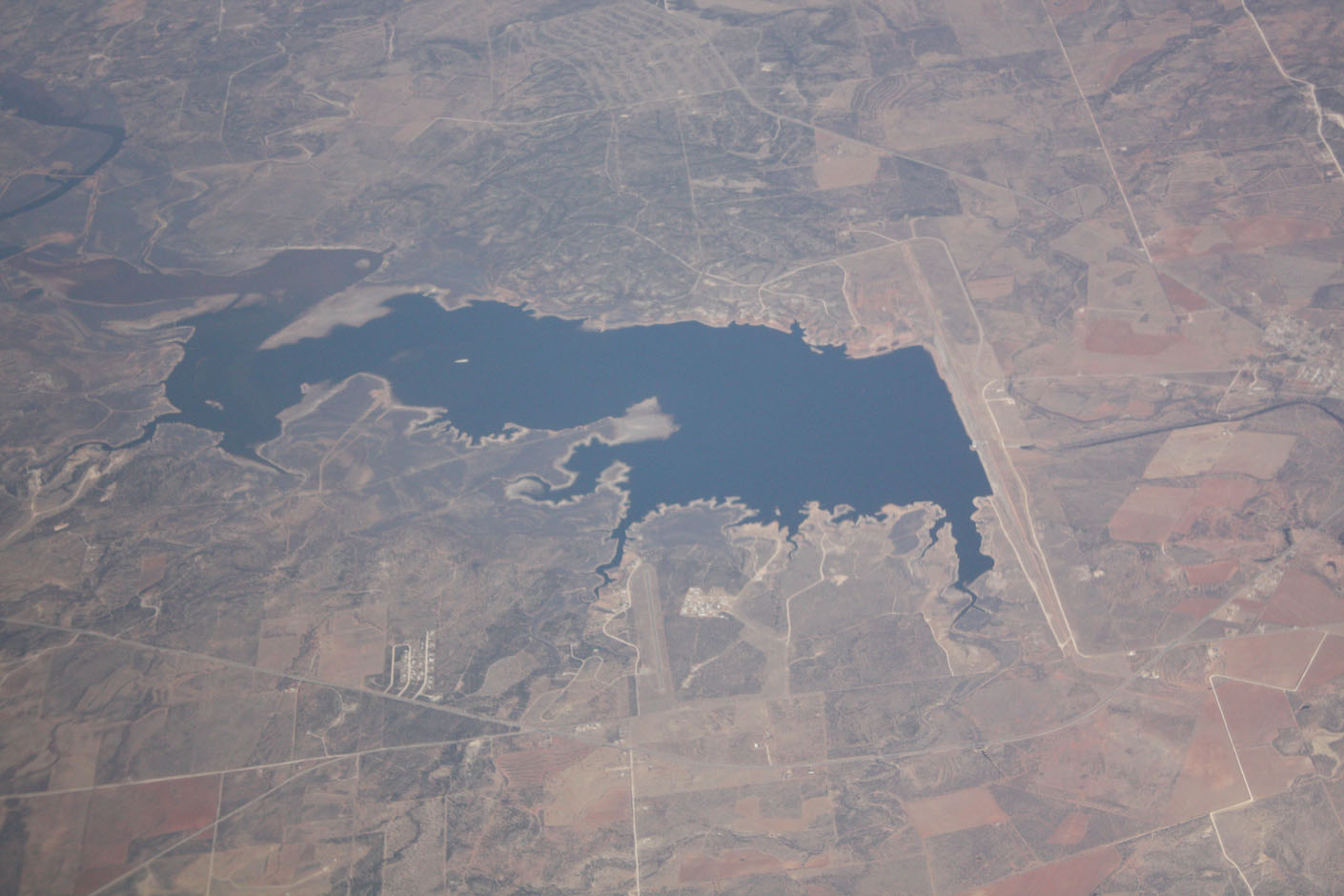
- E.V. Spence Reservoir, facing northeast, January 2009

- Location within Texas Location within the United States
- Location: Coke County, near Robert Lee, Texas
- Coordinates: 31°54′30″N 100°32′07″W
- Primary inflows: Colorado River
- Primary outflows: Colorado River
- Basin countries: United States
- Surface area: 14,950 acres (6,050 ha)
- Max. depth: 108 ft (33 m)
- Water volume: 488,750 acre⋅ft (602,860,000 m^{3})
- Surface elevation: 1,898 ft (579 m)

E.V. Spence Reservoir (also known as Lake E.V. Spence) is an artificial lake located west of (and upstream from) the town of Robert Lee, Texas. The reservoir was impounded by the creation of Robert Lee Dam in 1969, with the support of the Upper Colorado River Authority, to provide a reliable water supply for Robert Lee and the surrounding communities in Coke County. The lake also serves as a recreational venue for fishing, boating, and swimming. Robert Lee Dam is managed by the Colorado River Municipal Water District.

== Fish populations ==
E.V. Spence Reservoir has been stocked with species of fish intended to improve the utility of the reservoir for recreational fishing. Fish present in the lake include striped bass, largemouth bass, white bass, and catfish.

== Severe drought ==
In July 2011, the reservoir's level had sunk to less than 0.76% full — effectively dry. Severe drought conditions and record summer high temperatures in the area caused the Colorado River Municipal Water District to stop any further water withdrawals from Midland, Texas and surrounding communities. If the reservoir empties, the formerly reliable water source from the reservoir will need to be supplanted by trucking in water from other sources to supply the town of Robert Lee.

By September 2012, the lake reached its lowest level of 0.19% full, less than 1,000 acre-feet of storage, and an elevation of 1810.14 ft above datum, which was 87.86 feet below full. The lake would recover rapidly to nearly 6% capacity after a major rain event in September 2012. As of May 2015, the lake was 4.4% of capacity, up from 2% in May 2014. As of August 2, 2019, the lake was at 30.5% capacity.
