= Meadow Lake (Texas) =

- Location within Texas Location within the United States
- Location: Guadalupe County, Texas, United States
- Coordinates: 29°31′44″N 97°56′22″W
- Type: Hydroelectric reservoir
- Primary inflows: Guadalupe River
- Primary outflows: Guadalupe River
- Basin countries: United States
- Surface area: 153 acres (62 ha)
- Max. depth: 35 ft (11 m)
- Water volume: 1,550 acre⋅ft (1,910,000 m^{3})
- Surface elevation: 455 ft (139 m)

Meadow Lake is a reservoir on the Guadalupe River south of the town of Seguin in Guadalupe County, Texas. The reservoir was formed in 1931 by the construction of a dam to provide hydroelectric power to the area. Management of the dam and lake was assumed by the Guadalupe-Blanco River Authority on May 1, 1963. Meadow Lake also serves as a venue for outdoor recreation, including fishing and boating.

Meadow Lake is also known locally as Lake Nolte.

== Fish and plant life ==
Meadow Lake has been stocked with species of fish intended to improve the utility of the reservoir for recreational fishing. Fish present in Meadow Lake include catfish, spotted bass, white crappie, sunfish, and largemouth bass. Vegetation in the lake includes cattail, pondweed, American lotus, spatterdock, rushes, water hyacinth, water lettuce, and hydrilla.

== Recreational uses ==
There is no free public access to the lake. Two private boat ramps exist, for which a small fee is charged. Only small fishing boats are permitted to use these ramps. No jet skis, ski boats, or similar watercraft may use those facilities.
