= List of tributaries of the Colorado River (Texas) =

This list is incomplete, you can help Wikipedia by expanding it.

List of the tributaries of the Colorado River of Texas, that flows in the south-central United States to the Gulf of Mexico.

== Tributaries ==
The river's principal tributaries are the Concho River, Pecan Bayou, Llano River, San Saba River, and Pedernales River.

=== List ===
Tributaries are (from source to mouth):

- Concho River
- Pecan Bayou
- Llano River
- San Saba River
- Pedernales River
- Bull Creek
- Barton Creek
- Shoal Creek
- Waller Creek
- Boggy Creek
- Walnut Creek
- Onion Creek
- Cedar Creek
- Piney Creek

== See also ==
- Tributaries of the Colorado River (Texas)
