= Lake Wood =

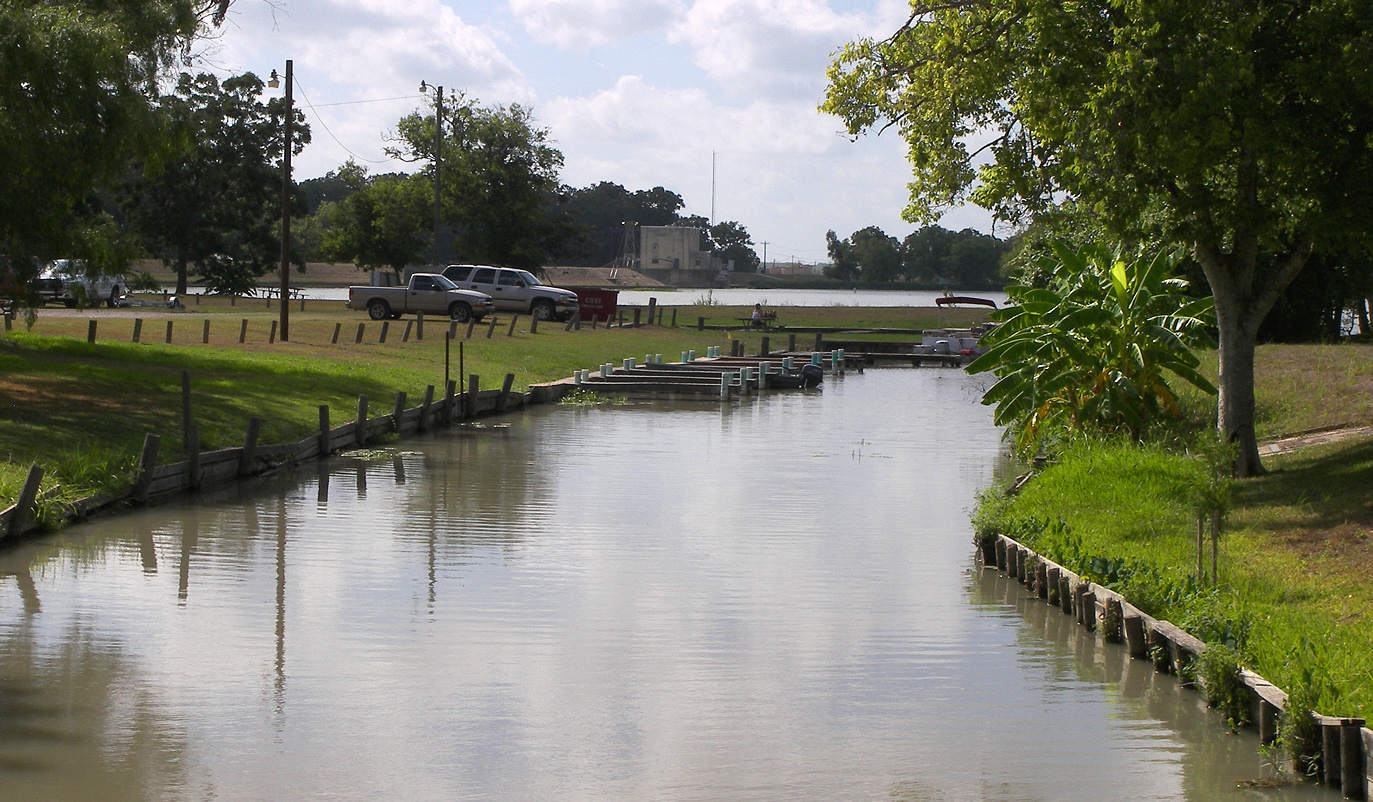
- Rec area at Lake Wood in 2008.

- Location within Texas Location within the United States
- Location: Gonzales County, Texas
- Coordinates: 29°28.12′N 97°29.66′W
- Type: Hydroelectric reservoir
- Primary inflows: Guadalupe River
- Primary outflows: Guadalupe River
- Basin countries: United States
- Surface area: 229 acres (93 ha)
- Max. depth: 17 ft (5.2 m)
- Water volume: 4,000 acre⋅ft (0.0049 km^{3})
- Surface elevation: 292 ft (89 m)

Lake Wood was a reservoir on the Guadalupe River 4 miles (6 km) west of the town of Gonzales in Gonzales County, Texas. The reservoir was formed in 1931 by the construction of a dam to provide hydroelectric power to the area. Management of the dam and lake was assumed by the Guadalupe-Blanco River Authority on May 1, 1963. Lake Wood served as a venue for outdoor recreation, including fishing and boating.

Lake Wood was also known locally as H-5 Reservoir or Guadalupe Reservoir H-5.

On March 10, 2016, after substantial rainfall, one of the reservoir gates failed, essentially draining Lake Wood. The area where the lake was is now overgrown and forest like.

== Fish and plant life ==
Lake Wood was stocked with species of fish intended to improve the utility of the reservoir for recreational fishing. Fish that were present in Lake Wood include catfish, white crappie, sunfish, and largemouth bass. Vegetation that was in the lake include cattail, pondweed, American lotus, spatterdock, rushes, water hyacinth, water lettuce, and hydrilla.

== Recreational uses ==
The Guadalupe-Blanco River Authority maintains a 35-acre (14 ha) park with a store on the lake with facilities for camping, canoeing, and fishing.
