= Bartholomew Joseph DeWitt =

American merchant founder (1835–1878)

- Born: 31 October 1835; Philadelphia, United States
- Died: 17 July 1878 (aged 42); San Angelo, Texas, United States
- Known for: Founder of San Angelo, Texas

Bartholomew Joseph DeWitt was an American merchant best known for being the founder of San Angelo, Texas.

== Early life ==
DeWitt was born in Philadelphia, Pennsylvania. By 1855 he moved to Texas, where he was resided in San Antonio. He met his wife soon after and got married. After his wives unexpected death he moved west. He had five children.

== Career ==
In 1870 DeWitt bought 320 acres of land from Granville Sherwood for a dollar an acre and near the Concho River he established a trading post, which was later called Santa Angela in honour of his wife. To buy the land DeWitt needed a loan off of Marcus Koeingheim. DeWitts time selling lots was largely unsuccessful and he ended up defaulting on his loan. Koeingheim took over the project and was much more successful than DeWitt, developing San Angelo into a proper town. DeWitt died in San Angelo in 1878 at the age of 42.

== Personal life ==
DeWitts wife was Carolina Angela de la Garza, the sister of Confederate officer José Rafeal de la Garza. DeWitt was the person responsible for bringing de la Garzas body back to his hometown after he was shot in the leg and bled to death during the war.
