= List of Texas river authorities =

River authorities in the U.S. state of Texas are public agencies established by the state legislature and given authority to develop and manage the waters of the state. These authorities are given powers to conserve, store, control, preserve, utilize, and distribute the waters of a designated geographic region for the benefit of the public.

The 24 Texas river authorities include the following:

- Angelina & Neches River Authority
- Bandera County River Authority and Groundwater District
- Brazos River Authority
- Central Colorado River Authority
- Guadalupe-Blanco River Authority
- Lavaca-Navidad River Authority
- Lower Colorado River Authority
- Lower Neches Valley Authority
- Nueces River Authority
- Palo Duro River Authority
- Red River Authority
- Sabine River Authority
- San Antonio River Authority
- San Jacinto River Authority
- Sulphur River Basin Authority
- Trinity River Authority
- Upper Colorado River Authority
- Upper Guadalupe River Authority
