= Guadalupe-Blanco River Authority =

Organization in Texas, United States

- Abbreviation: GBRA
- Formation: 1933
- Type: Government-owned corporation
- Purpose: Water conservation and reclamation
- Headquarters: 933 East Court Street, Seguin, Texas, 78155
- Region served: Ten counties in Texas
- General Manager: Darrell Nichols
- Main organ: Board of Directors
- Website: http://www.gbra.org/

The Guadalupe-Blanco River Authority or GBRA was formed in 1933 by the Texas legislature. Its main concerns are water supply and water conservation in the Guadalupe River Basin, which includes the Blanco, Comal, and San Marcos rivers. The authority extends over ten counties. The general offices of the authority are located at 933 East Court Street in Seguin.

== Dams and reservoirs ==
The GBRA currently operates dams that form seven reservoirs along the Guadalupe River in Texas:

- Lake Dunlap
- Lake Gonzales
- Lake McQueeney
- Meadow Lake
- Lake Placid
- Lake Wood

Other reservoirs managed by the GBRA include:

- Coleto Creek Reservoir

== See also ==
- Upper Guadalupe River Authority
- List of Texas river authorities
