= O.H. Ivie Lake =

- Location within Texas Location within the United States
- Location: Concho / Coleman / Runnels counties, east of San Angelo, Texas
- Coordinates: 31°32′23″N 99°41′3″W.
- Lake type: reservoir, domestic and municipal water supply
- Primary inflows: Colorado River / Concho River
- Primary outflows: Colorado River
- Basin countries: United States
- Surface area: 20,000 acres (8,100 ha)
- Water volume: 554,000 acre⋅ft (0.683 km^{3})
- Surface elevation: 1,551 ft (473 m)

O.H. Ivie Lake is a reservoir on the Colorado and Concho Rivers in Concho, Coleman, and Runnels counties, 55 miles east of San Angelo, Texas in the United States. The reservoir was formed in 1990 by the construction of S. W. Freese Dam at the Concho-Coleman county line by Brown and Root. The lake and dam are owned and operated by the Colorado River Municipal Water District.
