= James Hewetson =

- Born: 1797; Thomastown, County Kilkenny, Ireland
- Died: September 12, 1870 (aged 72–73); Saltillo, Coahuila, Mexico
- Spouse: Josefa Guajardo (m. 1833)

James Hewetson (c. 1797–1870) was a Texas empresario.

== Early life ==
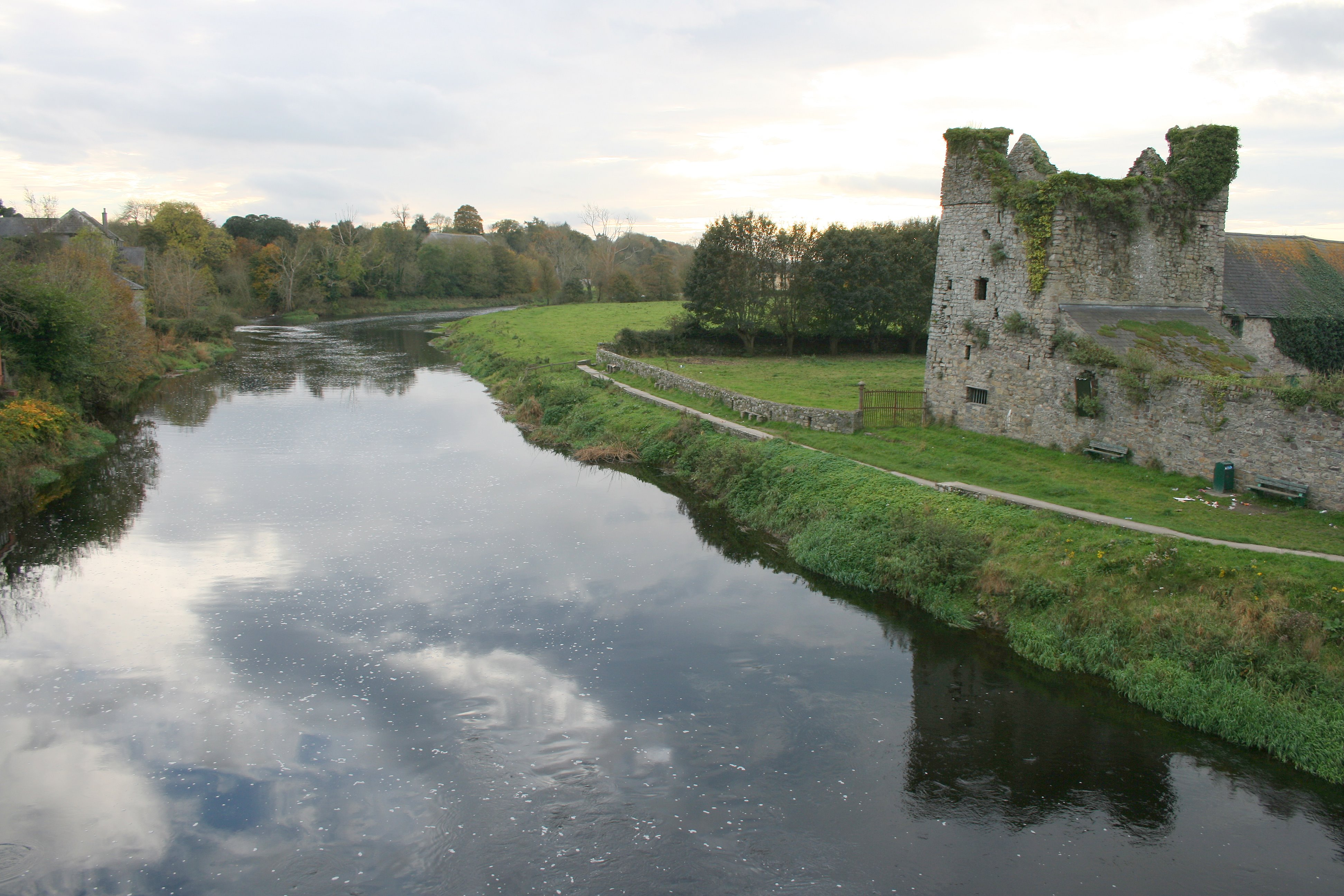
Thomastown, County Kilkenny, Ireland

Hewetson was born in Thomastown, County Kilkenny, Ireland in 1797, the son of Patrick and Honora (née Hoyne). After studying medicine, Hewitson emigrated to the United States.

== Early career in Coahuila ==
Already set on moving from the United States to Mexico, Hewetson encountered Stephen F. Austin in St. Louis, Missouri. Hewetson followed Austin to New Orleans and then was among those who accompanied Austin's first visit to Texas in 1821. Hewetson parted ways with Austin at San Antonio de Béxar and continued further on into Mexico, eventually settling at Saltillo and Monclova in Coahuila. Hewetson was involved in various mining, manufacturing, and mercantile businesses, as well as with local government in Coahuila.

== Empresario ==
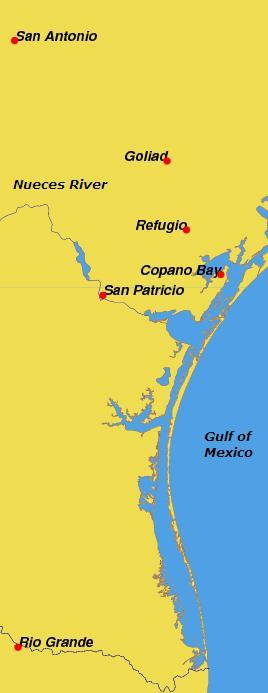
Map showing Refugio, Copano, and the Nueces River.

Hewetson and James Power partnered as empresarios in 1826 to establish a colony in Texas. After forming the partnership, Power and Hewetson applied to be empresarios with the Mexican government in 1825 in order to begin a colony on the Texas coast with Mexican and Irish families. The original 1826 application requested a grant between the Nueces and Sabine Rivers, but in 1828, the Mexican government instead offered the strip of land between the Guadalupe and Lavaca Rivers. The next year, Power and Hewetson requested more land and their holdings were extended west to the Nueces River, which included Nuestra Señora del Refugio Mission. Ownership disputes with other empresarios forced Power and Hewetson to cede some land east of the Guadalupe River and the new eastern boundary was drawn at Coleto Creek.

In 1833, Power returned to Ireland and searched for potential settlers of his colony. He convinced 350 individuals to travel with him to Texas to begin a settlement with promises of large plots of land. The immigrants traveled in two group with the first scheduled to land in New Orleans in April and the next scheduled for May. After the first group arrived in New Orleans, many of the settlers were struck with cholera and died. An additional lot were infected with cholera during the voyage from New Orleans to Texas, and died at the landing in Copano. These who survived either remained in Copano or traveled to the Refugio Mission, where they formed a settlement with Mexican colonists. In 1835, Hewetson sold his share of the empresario to Power and returned to Mexico. The land claims were eventually deemed invalid by the new Republic of Texas and designated as property of the state.

== Later life and death ==
On April 29, 1833, Hewetson married Josefa Guajardo, a wealthy widow. Hewetson remained in Coahuila throughout the Texas Revolution, in which he took no part. Hewetson died in Saltillo on September 12, 1870.
