= Colorado River (Texas) =

River in Texas, United States

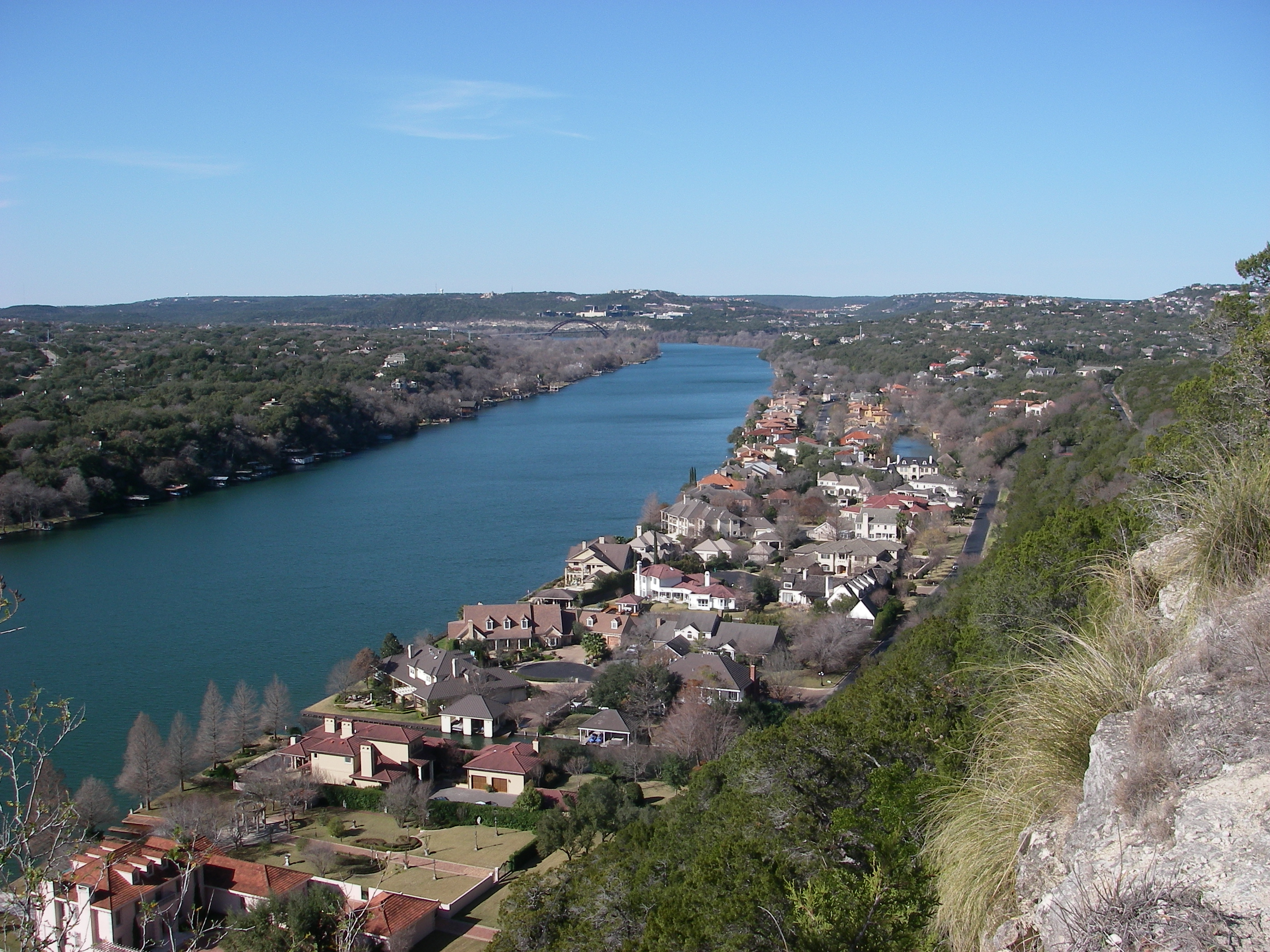
- Colorado River in Austin as seen from Mount Bonnell

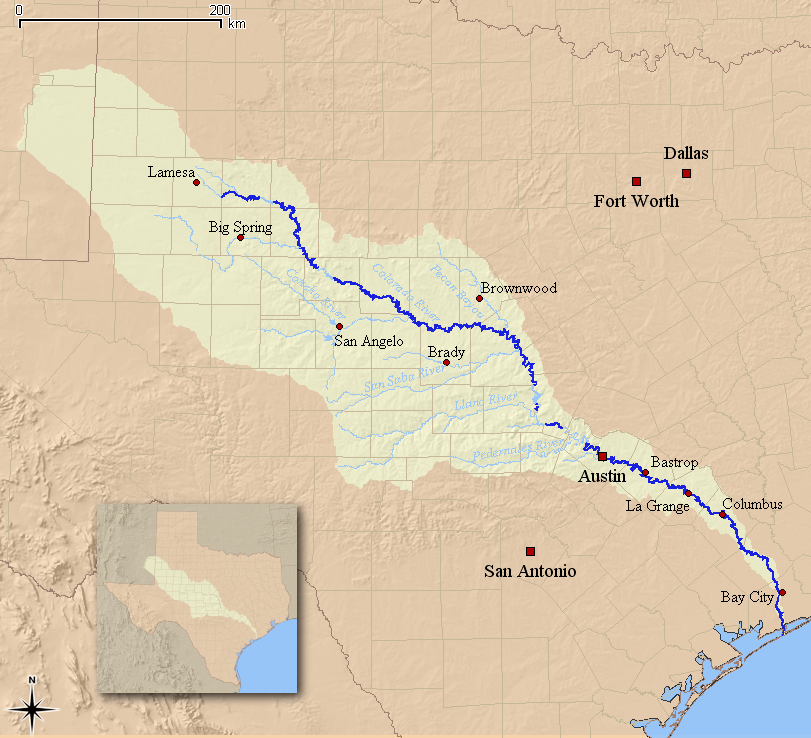
- Map of the Colorado River and associated watershed

Location
- Country: United States
- State: Texas
- Counties: Dawson, Borden,

Physical characteristics
- Source
  - location: Dawson County
  - coordinates: 32°40′47″N 101°43′51″W
  - elevation: 2,860 ft (870 m)
- Mouth: Matagorda Bay
  - location: Gulf of Mexico, at Matagorda County
  - coordinates: 28°35′41″N 95°58′59″W
  - elevation: 0 ft (0 m)
- Length: 862 mi (1,387 km)
- Basin size: 39,900 sq mi (103,000 km^{2})
- Discharge
  - location: Bay City
  - average: 2,609 cu ft/s (73.9 m^{3}/s)
  - minimum: 0 cu ft/s (0 m^{3}/s)
  - maximum: 84,100 cu ft/s (2,380 m^{3}/s)

The Colorado River is an approximately 862-mile-long (1,387 km) river in the U.S. state of Texas. It is the 11th longest river in the United States and the longest river with both its source and its mouth within Texas.

Its drainage basin and some of its usually dry tributaries extend into New Mexico. It flows generally southeast from Dawson County through Ballinger, Marble Falls, Lago Vista, Austin, Bastrop, Smithville, La Grange, Columbus, Wharton, and Bay City, before emptying into the Gulf of Mexico at Matagorda Bay.

== Course ==
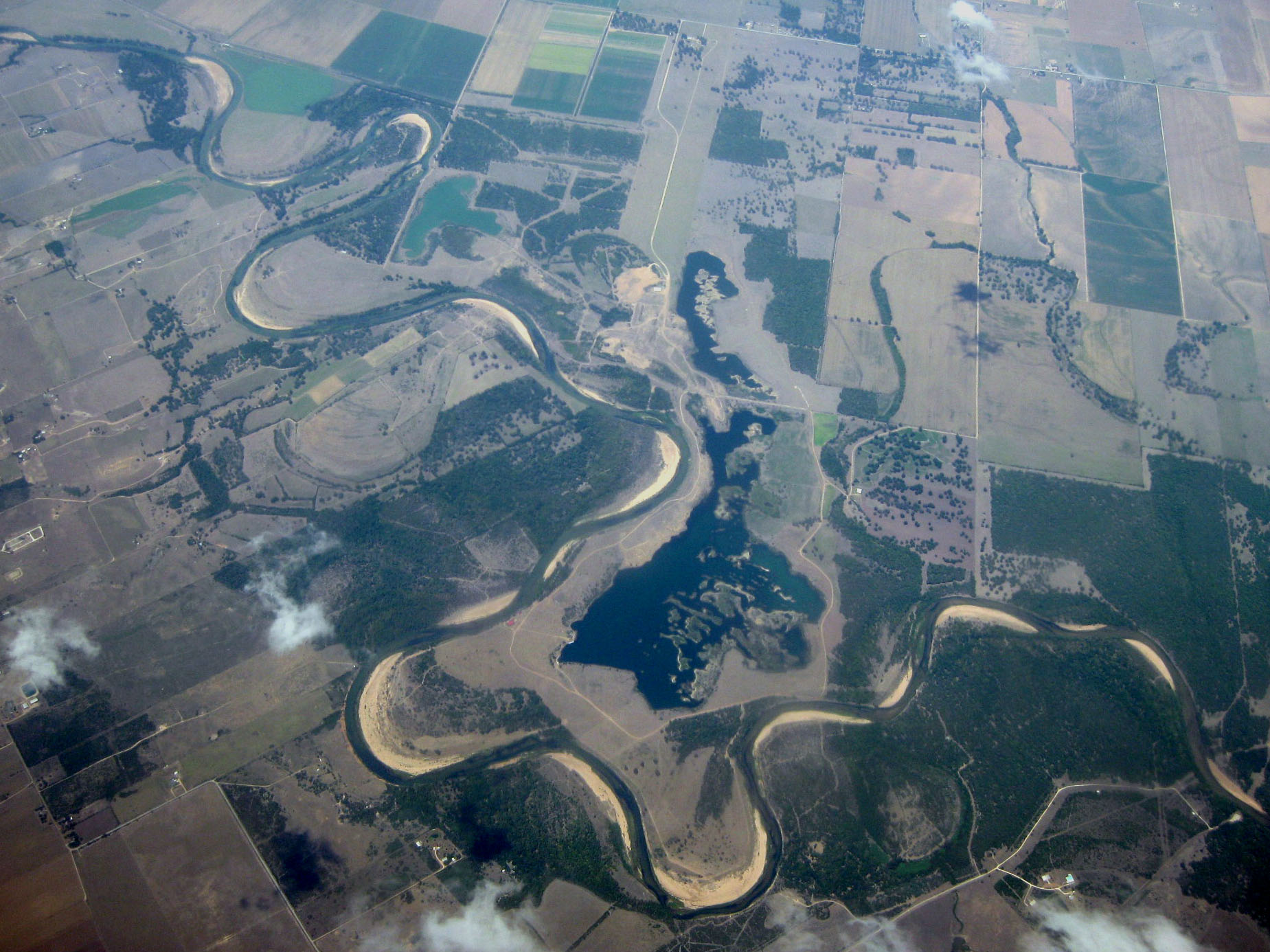
Oblique air photo of the Colorado River where it crosses from Colorado County into Wharton County near Nada.

The Colorado River originates south of Lubbock, on the Llano Estacado near Lamesa. It flows generally southeast out of the Llano Estacado and through the Texas Hill Country, then through several reservoirs including Lake J.B. Thomas, E.V. Spence Reservoir, and O.H. Ivie Lake. The river flows through several more reservoirs before reaching Austin, including Lake Buchanan, Inks Lake, Lake Lyndon B. Johnson (commonly referred to as Lake LBJ), and Lake Travis. The Llano River joins the Colorado at Lake LBJ near Kingsland, and the Pedernales River joins at Lake Travis near Briarcliff. After passing through Austin, the Colorado River continues flowing southeast until emptying into Matagorda Bay on the Gulf of Mexico, near Matagorda.

== History ==
The Colorado River, which means 'red' or 'reddish' river in Spanish, was frequently confused by Spanish explorers with the Brazos River to the north. The European discoverer of these two neighboring rivers called the present Colorado River the Brazos de Dios, and called the present Brazos the Colorado River. The two names would later be reversed.

The upper Colorado River was controlled by Comanches from the early 18th century to the late 19th century. In 1757, Spanish Texas attempted to establish an outlying Catholic mission (Mission Santa Cruz de San Sabá) on the San Saba River, near its confluence with the Colorado River. Nearly defenseless and viewed by the Comanche tribe as a territorial invasion, the mission was sacked in 1758 by about 2,000 Comanches and their allies. The Comanche were not effectively challenged on the upper Colorado River for nearly a century.

== River modifications ==
The river is an important source of water for farming, cities, and electrical power production. Major man-made reservoirs on the river include Lake Buchanan, Inks Lake, Lake LBJ, Lake Marble Falls, Lake Travis, Lake Austin, Town Lake now called Lady Bird Lake in Austin. Collectively, these lakes are known as the Highland Lakes. In addition to power plants operating on each of the major lakes, waters of the Colorado are used for cooling the South Texas Nuclear Project near Bay City. The Colorado River Municipal Water District owns and operates three reservoirs upstream of the Highland Lakes: Lake J. B. Thomas near Snyder, E.V. Spence Reservoir near Robert Lee, and O.H. Ivie Lake near Ballinger.

Flood control and use of the Colorado River is managed by two agencies established by the Texas Legislature: the Upper Colorado River Authority and the Lower Colorado River Authority. There are 11 major reservoirs along the Colorado River.

== Major tributaries ==
The Colorado River is joined by five significant tributaries: the Concho River, Pecan Bayou, the Llano River, the San Saba River and the Pedernales River. Beals Creek is also a tributary fed by arroyos such as the Sulphur Springs Draw, the Johnson Draw, and the McKenzie, Seminole, Monument, Mustang, and Midland draws.

== Gallery ==
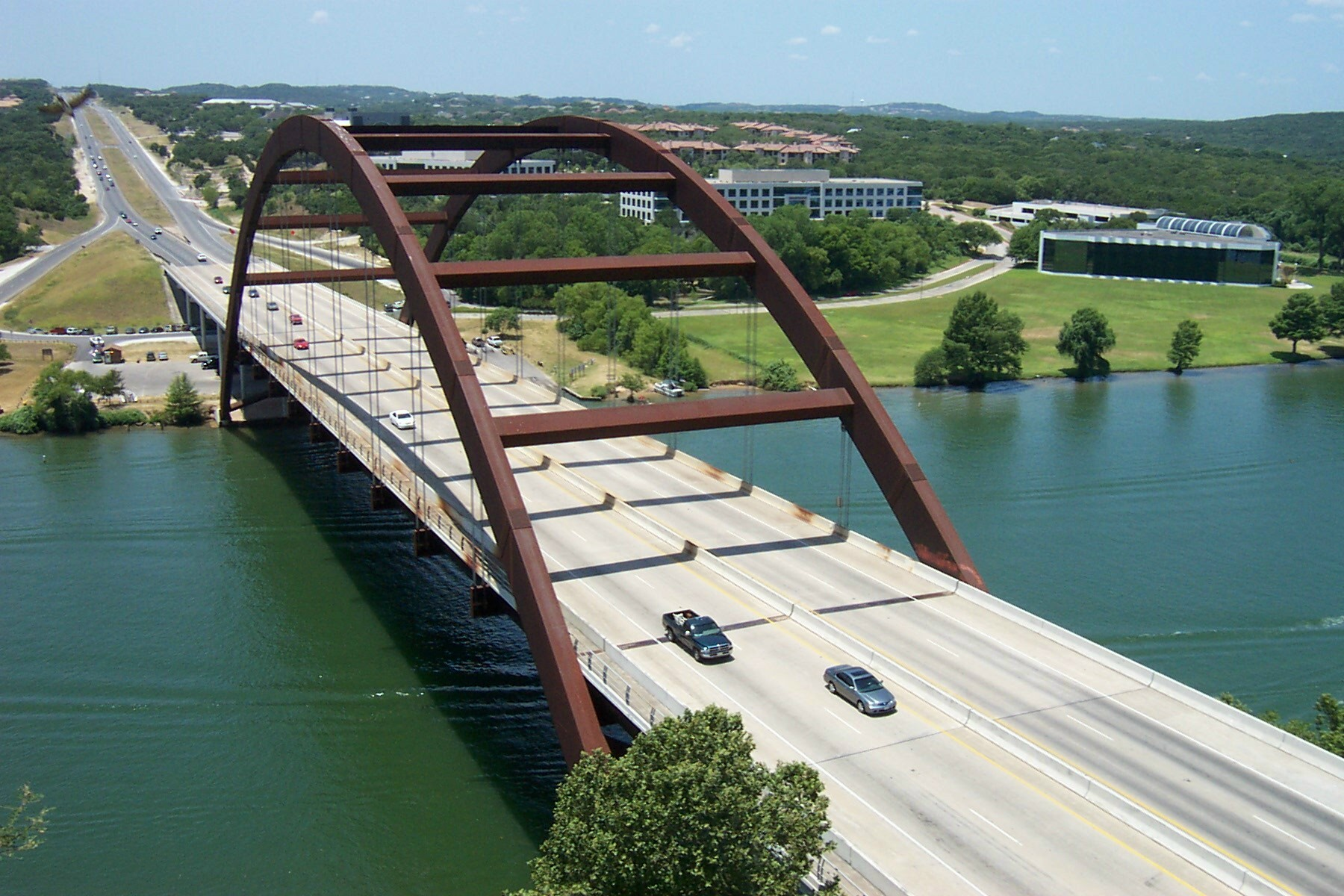
Pennybacker Bridge crossing the Lake Austin portion of the Colorado River

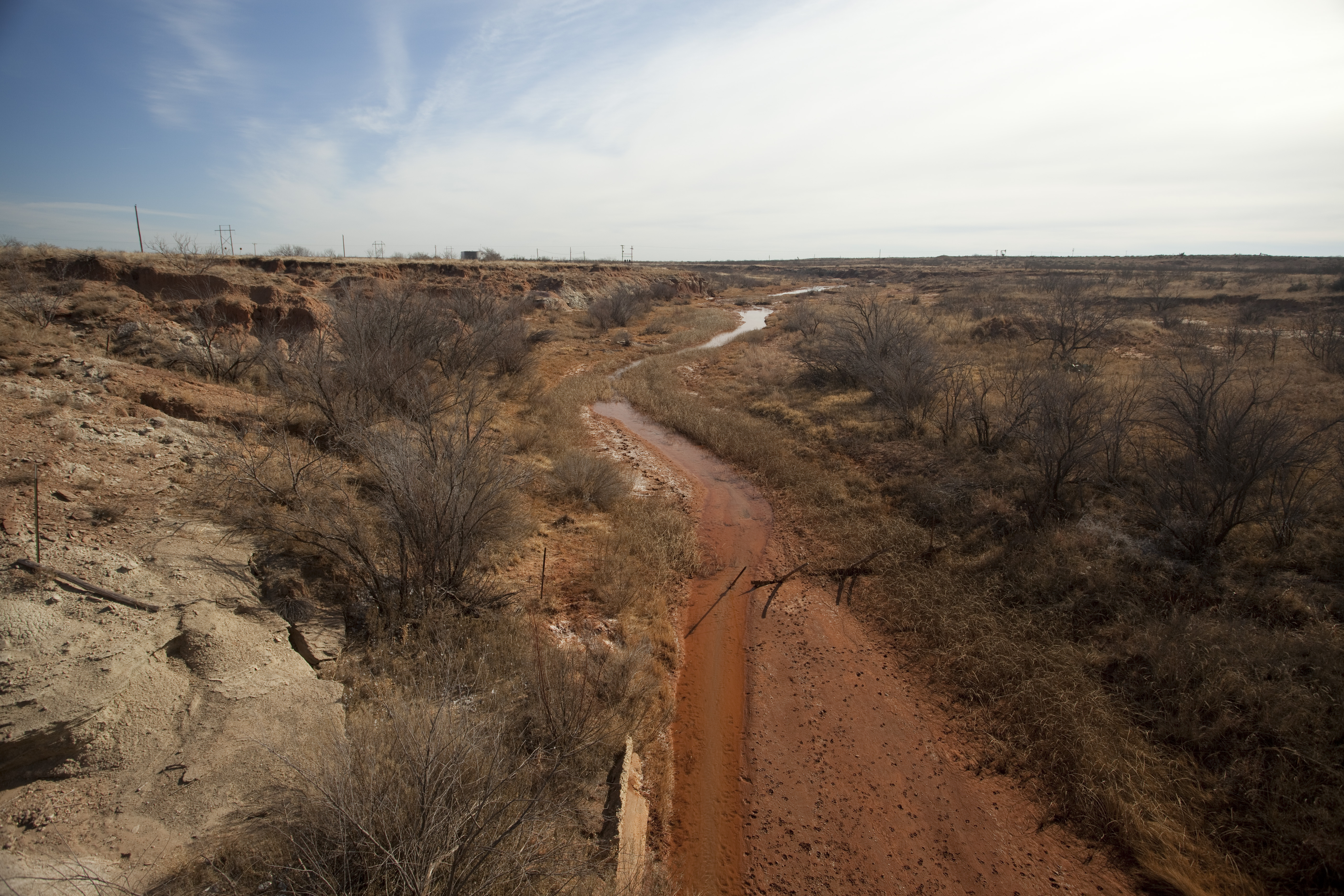
The Colorado River 5 mi (8 km) from its source along the Caprock Escarpment, the border of Dawson and Borden County.

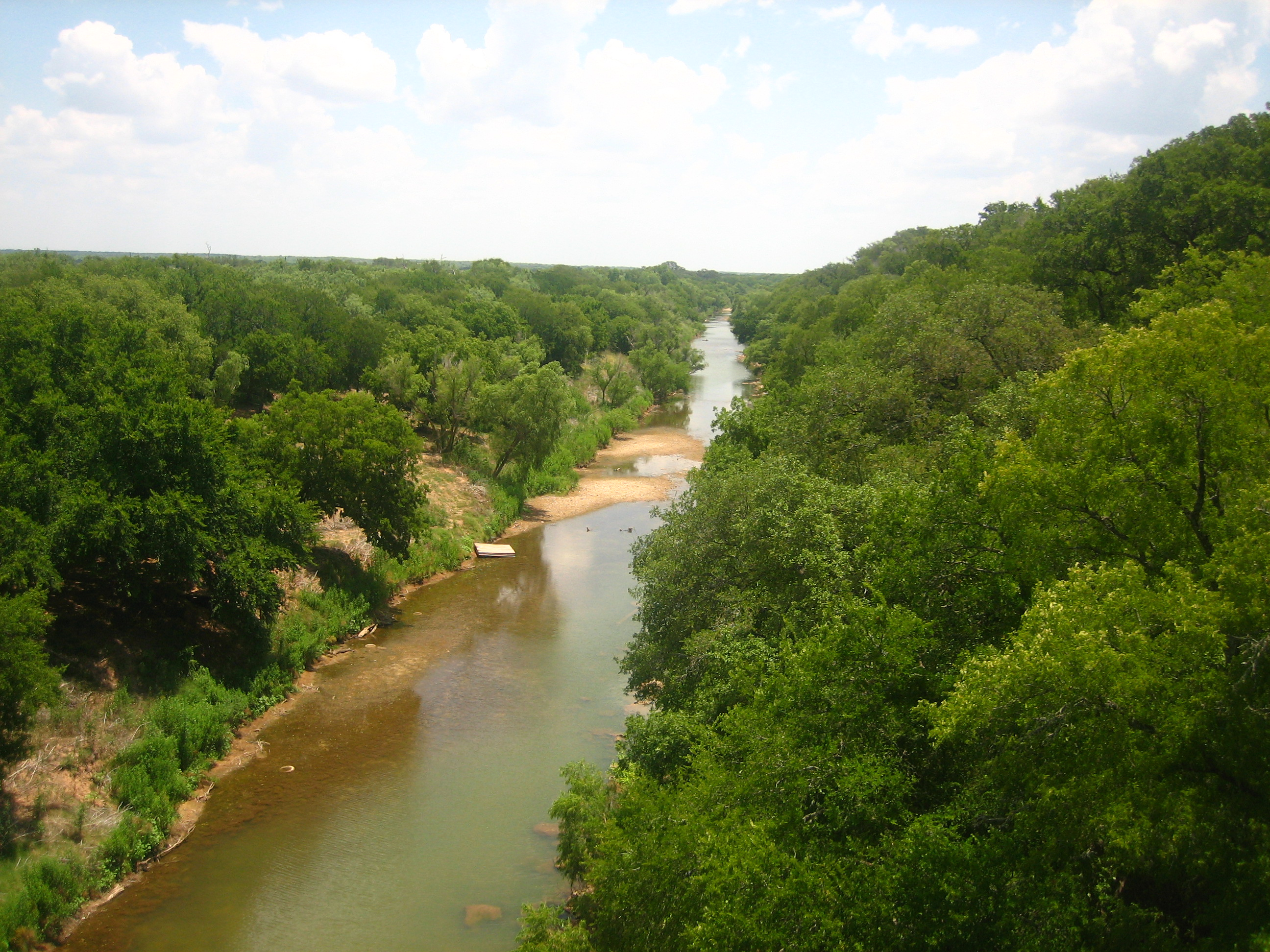
Colorado River under the Regency Suspension Bridge on the border of Mills and San Saba County

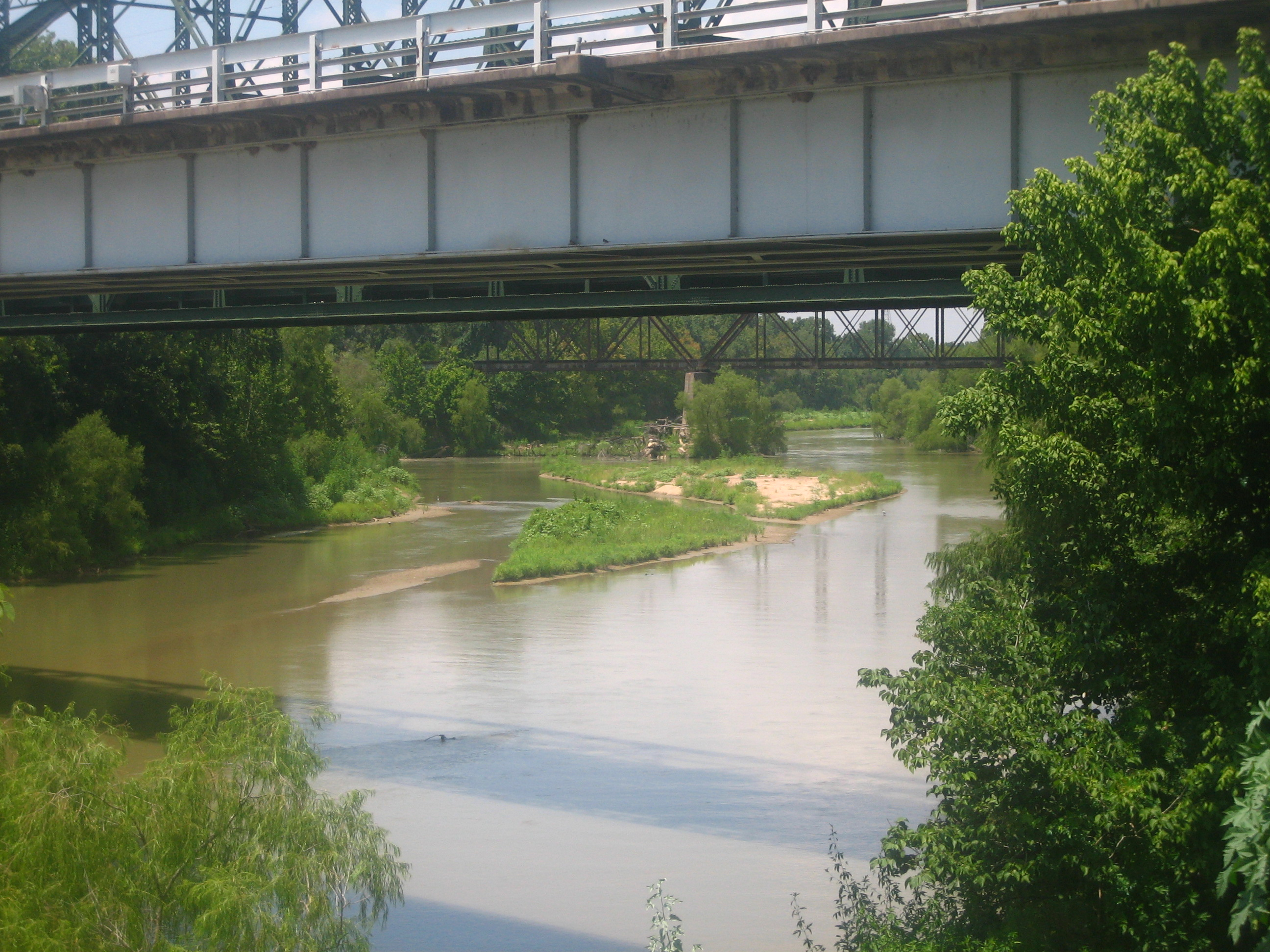
Scenic view of Colorado River meandering under a bridge overpass under State Highway 60 in Wharton

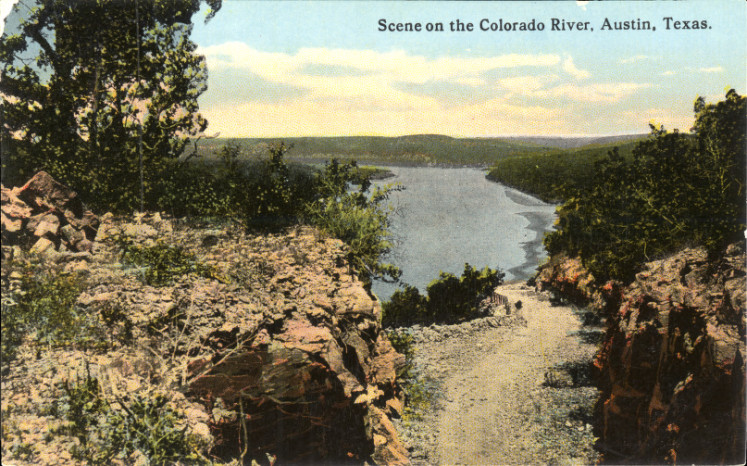
Scene on the Colorado River, Austin, Texas (postcard, c. 1907)

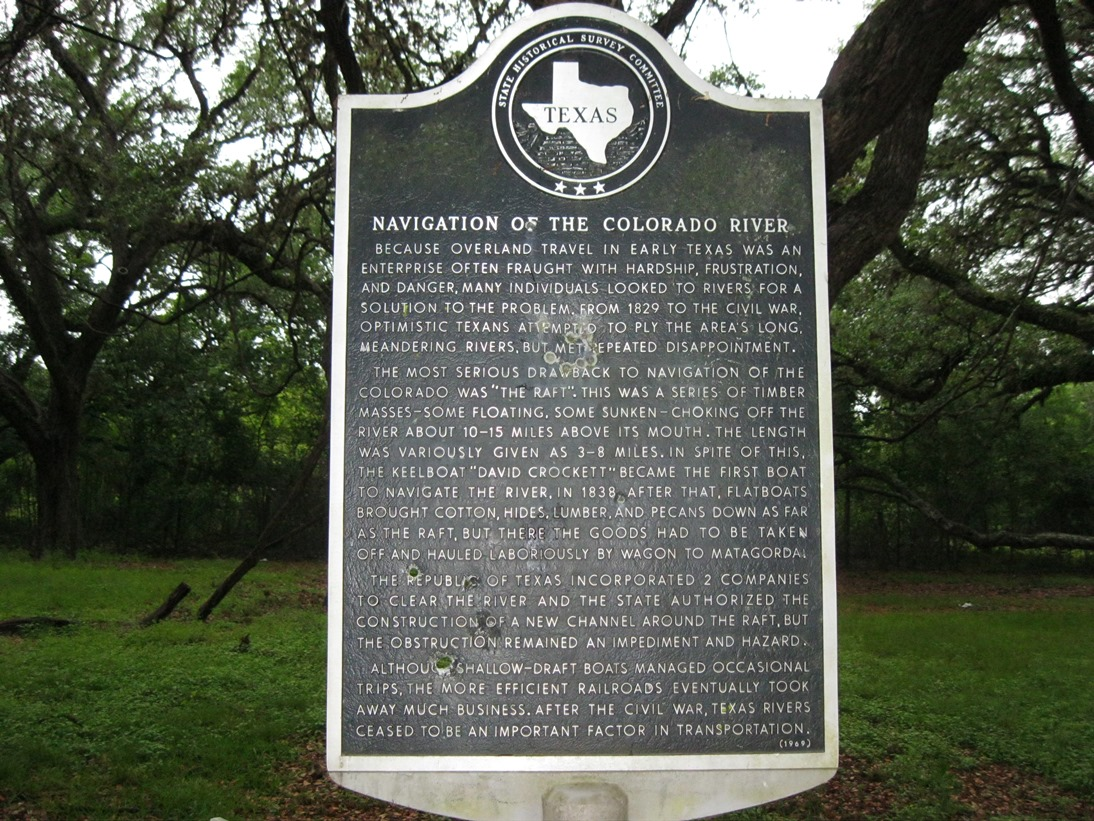
A historical marker on US 90A between Eagle Lake and Altair explains the difficulty of navigating the lower Colorado River in the 1800s.

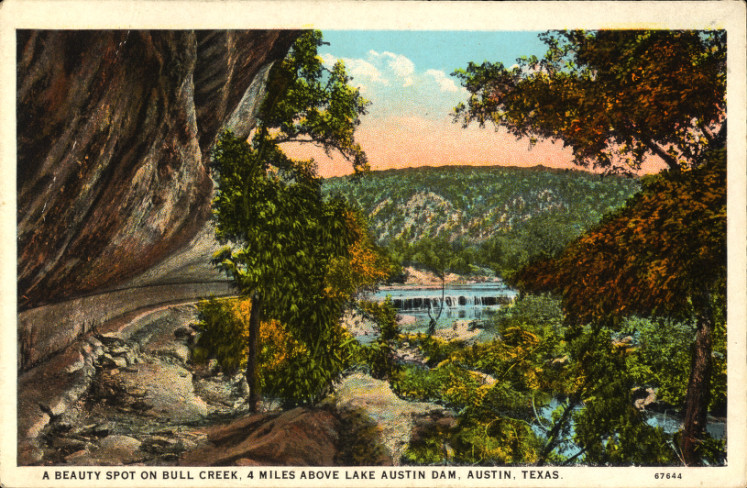
Old postcard of Bull Creek in Austin

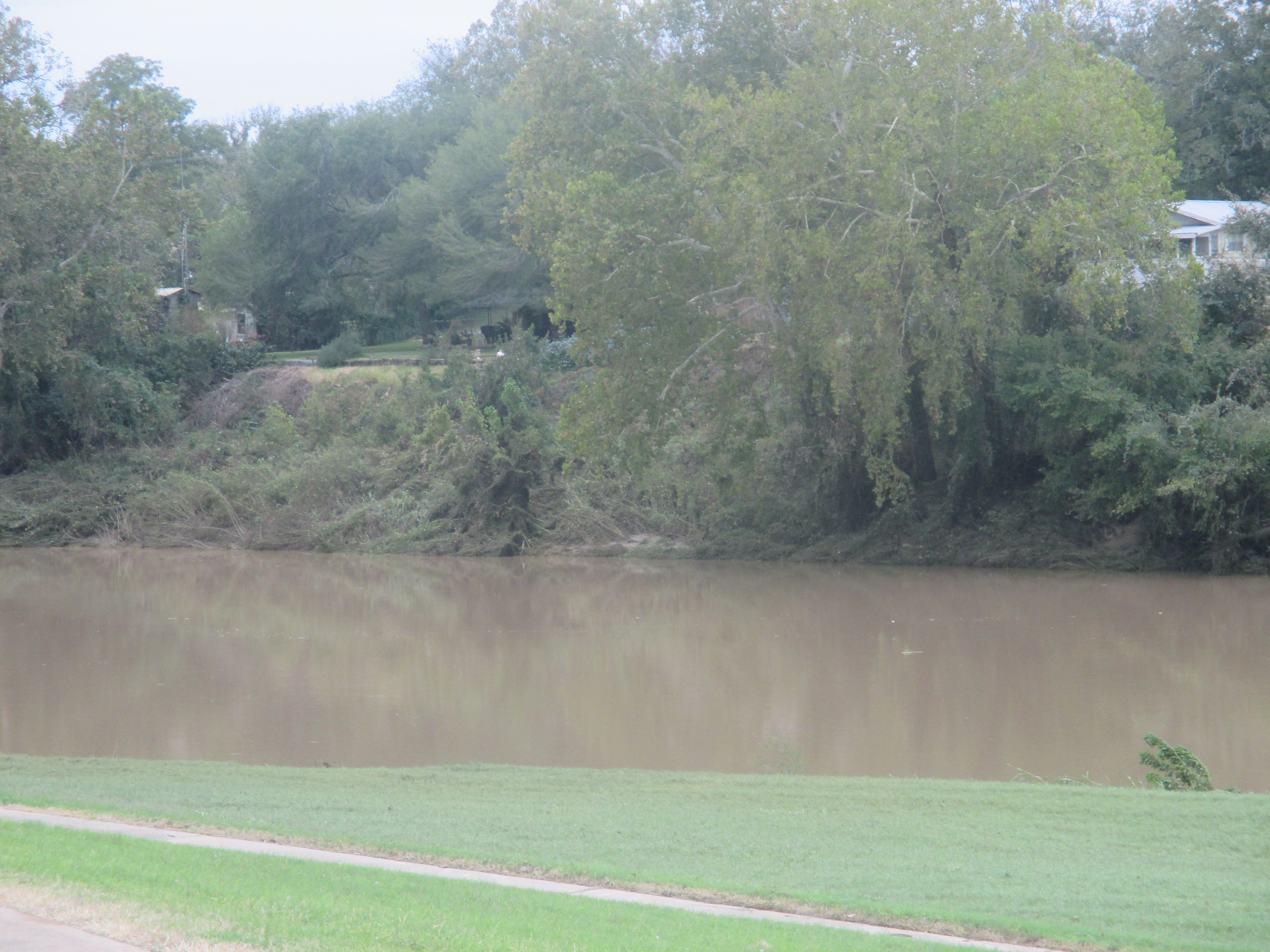
Colorado River east of Columbus, Texas

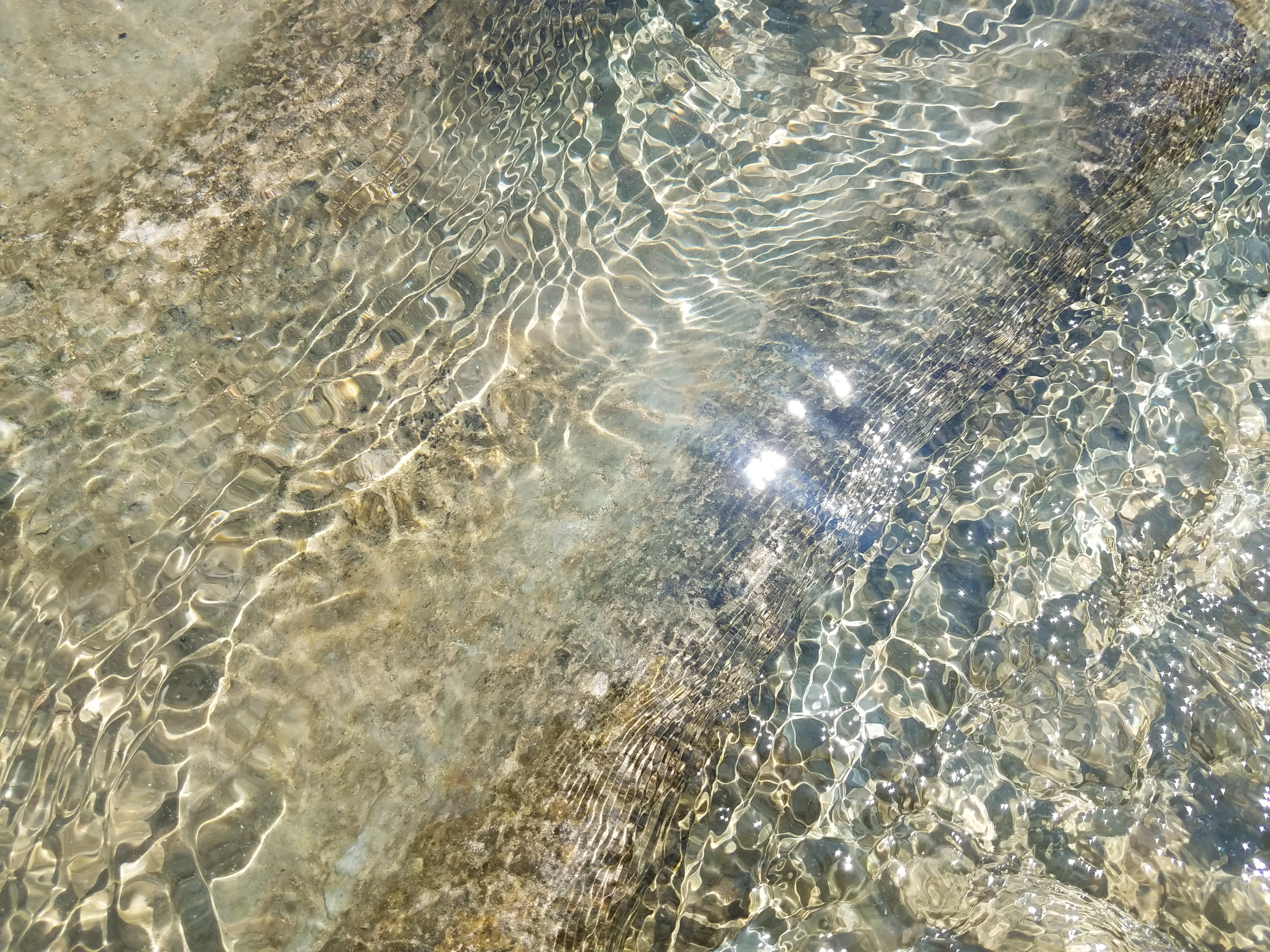
Water reflections on sculpture falls

== See also ==
- Colorado City, Texas
- List of crossings of the Colorado River (Texas)
- List of rivers of Texas
- List of tributaries of the Colorado River (Texas)
- Matagorda Bay—the river's mouth
- Texas Hill Country
