= Upper Guadalupe River Authority =

- Abbreviation: UGRA
- Formation: 1939
- Type: Government-owned corporation
- Purpose: Water management
- Headquarters: 125 Lehmann Dr. Suite 100, Kerrville, Texas, 78028
- Region served: Kerr County, Texas
- President: Bob Waller
- Website: http://www.ugra.org/

The Upper Guadalupe River Authority or UGRA was created in 1939 by the Texas Legislature as a quasi-governmental entity to manage the Guadalupe River as a water resource in Kerr County, Texas. The authority is chartered with the mandate "to control, develop, store, preserve and distribute" the water resources of the Upper Guadalupe River watershed. The organization is managed by a nine-person board of directors appointed to five-year terms by the governor of Texas. The UGRA is a taxing authority, and derives a portion of its funding from property taxes levied against residents of Kerr County. The authority previously operated a Regional Water Testing Laboratory and a county-wide flood alert system, but does not operate any dams.

About a decade after it was installed, in the late 1980s the flood alert system became antiquated and suffered breakdowns. The river authority ultimately closed it in 1999, saying it was “unreliable with some of the system’s stations not reporting information,” according to an article in the Kerrville Daily Times.

== See also ==
- Guadalupe-Blanco River Authority
- List of Texas river authorities
