= Lake Placid (Texas) =

- Location within Texas Location within the United States
- Location: Guadalupe County, Texas
- Coordinates: 29°32.86′N 98°0.49′W
- Type: reservoir
- Primary inflows: Guadalupe River
- Primary outflows: Guadalupe River
- Basin countries: United States
- Surface area: 198 acres (80 ha)
- Max. depth: 40 ft (12 m)
- Water volume: 2,624 acre⋅ft (0.003237 km^{3})
- Surface elevation: 498 ft (152 m)

Lake Placid is a reservoir on the Guadalupe River one-half mile (0.80 km) southwest of the town of Seguin in Guadalupe County, Texas. The reservoir was formed in 1928 by the construction of a dam on the river. Management of the dam and lake was assumed by the Guadalupe-Blanco River Authority on May 1, 1963. Lake Placid is a venue for outdoor recreation, including fishing, boating, and swimming.

== Fish and plant life ==
Lake Placid has been stocked with species of fish intended to improve the utility of the reservoir for recreational fishing. Fish present in Lake Placid include catfish, white crappie, sunfish, and largemouth and spotted bass. Vegetation in the lake includes cattail, pondweed, American lotus, spatterdock, rushes, water hyacinth, water lettuce, and hydrilla.

== Recreational uses ==
The only free public boat ramp and lake access is available off exit 605 of Interstate Highway 10.
