= Ugra (inhabited locality) =

Ugra (Russian: Угра) is the name of several rural localities in Russia:

- Ugra, Kaluga Oblast, a village under the administrative jurisdiction of the City of Kaluga in Kaluga Oblast
- Ugra, Smolensk Oblast, a selo in Ugranskoye Rural Settlement of Ugransky District in Smolensk Oblast
