= Dunlap Lake (Edwardsville, Illinois) =

Lake in Illinois, United States

Dunlap Lake is a 138-acre private lake east of downtown Edwardsville in Madison County, Illinois, United States, which was created by Orie T. Dunlap in the 1930s. The community is a private-residential district where residents can swim, fish and boat. The Dunlap Lake Property Owners Association was founded in 1950 and incorporated as a non-profit organization in 1952 to maintain and protect the lake and the subdivision.

== History ==
Orie T. Dunlap, owner of Madison Construction Company, purchased a parcel of land outside of Edwardsville on Oct. 1, 1936 from George Foehrkolb to create a private lake subdivision. In April 1938, Dunlap also purchased an additional 42 acres outside of Edwardsville to form the lake space itself. Construction of the lake began in November 1940 and the first phase was completed in May 1941. The beginning of World War II halted the road construction around the lake because road oil was not available. After the war, construction was completed in 1946 and Dunlap began selling the 526 lots. At that time there were 252 lots along the 15 miles of lakefront. The subdivision was annexed to Edwardsville in 1977 in order for residents to receive federal and state grants to build a reliable sewer system.

The lake is home to 354 people and is still a vibrant community. The subdivision is still owned and operated by the Dunlap Lake Property Owners Association.

== Recreational ==
Property owners of Dunlap Lake enjoy boating, fishing, swimming and ice skating. Twice a year, fishing tournaments are held, one for adults and one for children. Dunlap Lake also holds social events, such as a holiday social (which attendees donate toys and food to the Glen Ed Pantry), a bonfire and a luau.

Dunlap Lake has stocked fish for recreational use. Some of the fish include Channel Catfish, Walleye, hog largemouth bass Hybrid striped bass and Muskellunge.
