= Lake McQueeney =

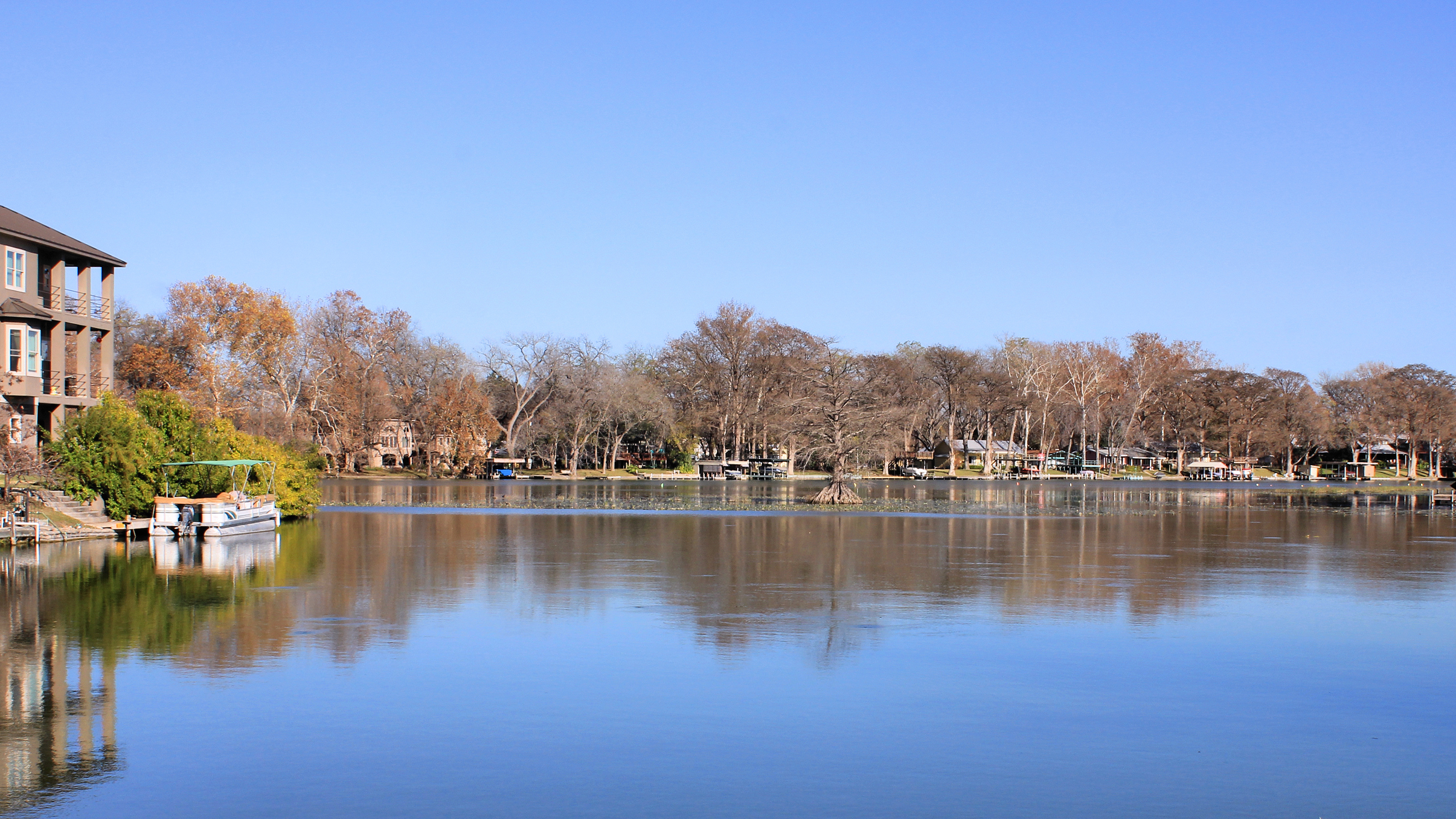

- Location within Texas Location within the United States
- Location: Guadalupe County, Texas
- Coordinates: 29°36.00′N 98°2.18′W
- Lake type: Hydroelectric reservoir
- Primary inflows: Guadalupe River
- Primary outflows: Guadalupe River
- Basin countries: United States
- Surface area: 396 acres (160 ha)
- Max. depth: 40 ft (12 m)
- Water volume: 5,050 acre⋅ft (0.00623 km^{3})
- Surface elevation: 529 ft (161 m)

Lake McQueeney is a reservoir on the Guadalupe River located 5 miles (8 km) west of Seguin in Guadalupe County, Texas, United States. It was formed in 1928 by the construction of a dam to provide hydroelectric power to the area. Management of the dam and lake was assumed by the Guadalupe-Blanco River Authority on May 1, 1963. Its prominent feature is Treasure Island, a residential area that has been subjected to major flooding in 1972, 1998, and 2002. Most of it is approximately 10 feet (3 m) deep, with deeper sections along the center channel of the river. It is a venue for outdoor recreation, including fishing, boating, and swimming, and is maintained at a constant level year round. Amid concerns of aging dams along the lower Guadalupe River, the Guadalupe-Blanco River Authority announced that four lakes will be drained including lake McQueeny beginning Sept 16th (2019).

== Fish and plant life ==
The lake has been stocked with species of fish intended to improve the utility of the reservoir for recreational fishing. Fish present in it include catfish, white crappie, sunfish, spotted bass, and largemouth bass. Vegetation in the lake includes cattail, pondweed, American lotus, spatterdock, rushes, water hyacinth, water lettuce, and hydrilla.

== Recreational uses ==
Despite being entirely managed using public funds, there are no public parks or free boat ramps on the lake's shore. Many private homes line the perimeter of it. In the center is an extensively developed island called Treasure Island on which many vacation and summer homes have been built.
