= Lake Dunlap =

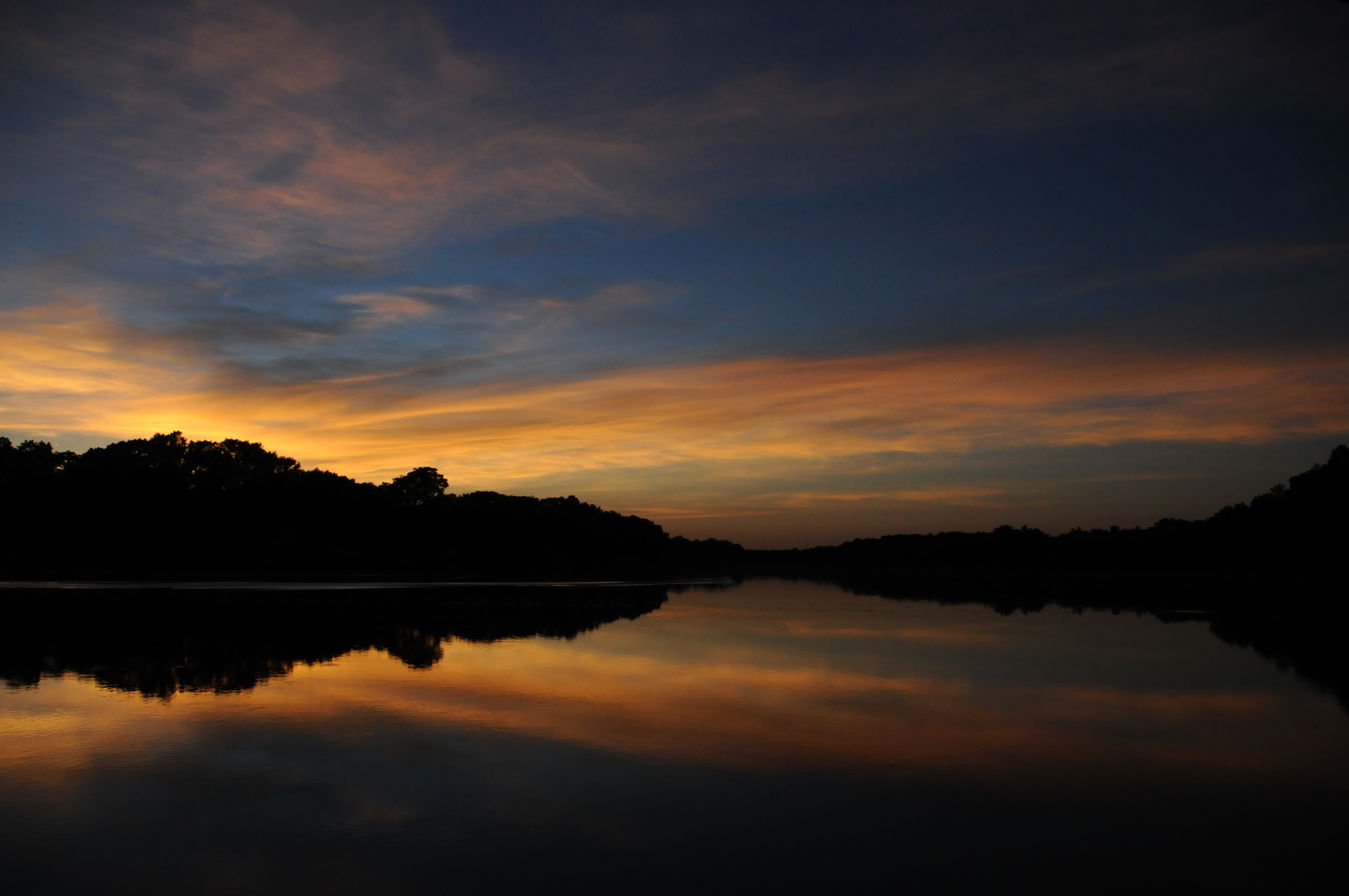
- Lake Dunlap in 2008

- Location within Texas Location within the United States
- Location: Guadalupe County, Texas
- Coordinates: 29°40.70′N 98°4.00′W
- Type: Hydroelectric reservoir
- Primary inflows: Guadalupe River
- Primary outflows: Guadalupe River
- Basin countries: United States
- Surface area: 410 acres (170 ha)
- Max. depth: 40 ft (12 m)
- Water volume: 5,900 acre⋅ft (0.0073 km^{3})
- Surface elevation: 575 ft (175 m)

Lake Dunlap is a reservoir on the Guadalupe River near the town of New Braunfels in Guadalupe County, Texas, United States. The reservoir was formed in 1931 by the construction of a dam to provide hydroelectric power to the area. Management of the dam and lake was assumed by the Guadalupe-Blanco River Authority on May 1, 1963. Lake Dunlap serves as a venue for outdoor recreation, including fishing and boating. In 2019, the dam failed, draining the lake. The repair was completed in August 2023, and the lake fully restored by the end of October that year.

== Fish and plant life ==
Lake Dunlap is stocked with species of fish intended to improve the utility of the reservoir for recreational fishing. Fish present in Lake Dunlap include catfish, crappie, striped bass, and largemouth bass.

== Recreational uses ==
The only free public access to the lake is a boat ramp located at the overpass of Interstate Highway 35 in New Braunfels. Lake Dunlap offers mostly calm water due to its narrow size (in parts) and protection from wind by shoreline trees. Wakeboarders, skiers, and other recreational enthusiasts use Lake Dunlap daily due to its family friendly calmness, temperature, and status of near-private lake.

== Dam failure ==
On the morning of May 14, 2019, at 8:05 am local, the dam's 90-year-old middle spillway unexpectedly collapsed, nearly draining the lake by day's end. The lower, concrete portion of the dam remained in place. The collapse was due to aging structural steel. The Guadalupe-Blanco River Authority worked with lakeside residents who formed an engineering and technical committee and a temporary water-control improvement district. Engineers and the Texas Water Development Board devised a solution to replace the spill gates at Dunlap and GBRA's other remaining aging dams. On November 3, 2020, the residents of Lake Dunlap voted on and passed three propositions which allow for the creation of a formal water-control district and assessment of ad valorem taxes that funded the construction of a new dam. The construction of the new design was completed on August 31, 2023 and the lake began refilling that same day. On October 26, 2023, the water level was officially restored to full after the rebuilding of the dam.

== See also ==
- Lake Dunlap, Texas – residential community and census-designated place.
