= Coleto Creek =

Stream in Texas, United States

Location
- Country: United States
- State: Texas

Physical characteristics
- Mouth
  - location: 28.6978°N 97.0134°W

Coleto Creek is a 25-mile (40 km) stream in Texas. It runs through the small town of Yorktown, Texas. It feeds the Coleto Creek Reservoir. Its mouth is at the Guadalupe River.

Coleto is a name derived Spanish meaning either "jacket" or "a man's body".

== See also ==
- List of rivers of Texas
