= Genesis High School =

Location
- 1200 Cedar Street; Bastrop, Texas 78602; United States; 30.117199°N 97.313708°W

Information
- Type: Public high school
- School district: Bastrop Independent School District
- Principal: Martin Conrardy
- Teaching staff: 7.45 (FTE)
- Grades: 9-12
- Enrollment: 150 (2023-2024)
- Student to teacher ratio: 20.13
- Website: Official Website

Genesis High School is a secondary alternative school located in Bastrop, Texas, in the Bastrop Independent School District. The school serves all of BISD, including the cities of Bastrop, Cedar Creek, Red Rock, Rockne, Paige and other rural areas of Bastrop County. For the 2024-2025 school year, the school was given a "C" by the Texas Education Agency.

Genesis High School is an alternative school and does not have school team sports; however, it does offer physical education, also known as PE.
