= Cedar Creek High School =

Cedar Creek High School may refer to:

- Cedar Creek High School (New Jersey), Egg Harbor City, Atlantic County, New Jersey
- Cedar Creek High School (Texas), Cedar Creek, Texas
