= Conalia helva =

Scientific classification
- Domain: Eukaryota
- Kingdom: Animalia
- Phylum: Arthropoda
- Class: Insecta
- Order: Coleoptera
- Suborder: Polyphaga
- Infraorder: Cucujiformia
- Family: Mordellidae
- Genus: Conalia
- Species: C. helva

Binomial name
- Conalia helva (LeConte, 1862)

Synonyms
- Glipodes helva LeConte, 1862

Species of beetle

Conalia helva is a beetle in the genus Conalia of the family Mordellidae. It was described in 1862 by John Lawrence LeConte. It has been found in dead Pinus taeda logs and peach wood.
