= Bivian Lee =

American football player (1948–1984)

No. 11
- Position: Cornerback

Personal information
- Born: August 3, 1948; Austin, Texas, U.S.
- Died: November 14, 1984 (aged 36); New Orleans, Louisiana, U.S.
- Listed height: 6 ft 3 in (1.91 m)
- Listed weight: 200 lb (91 kg)

Career information
- High school: Emile (TX)
- College: Prairie View A&M
- NFL draft: 1971: 3rd round, 54th overall pick

Career history
- New Orleans Saints (1971–1975)

Career NFL statistics
- Interceptions: 9
- INT yards: 110
- Fumble recoveries: 3
- Stats at Pro Football Reference

Bivian Lewis Lee Jr. (August 3, 1948 – November 14, 1984) was an American professional football cornerback in the National Football League (NFL). The New Orleans Saints selected him in the third round of the 1971 NFL draft. He played college football at Prairie View A&M.

Lee played quarterback at Emile High School in Bastrop, Texas. He went to Prairie View, where he remains the record-holder for 21 career interceptions. He also returned one interception 105 yards for a score.

Lee led the Saints in interceptions with four in 1972 and was tied for the team lead with three in 1973.

He died of cardiac arrhythmia, with his death providing some impetus for congressional investigations into dietary supplements.

His son, Bivian "Sonny" Lee III, was honored during the 15th Annual BET Awards for his work as the founder of Son of a Saint, a 501 c 3 organization based in New Orleans that mentors boys whose fathers have been incarcerated or are dead.
