= Conalia melanops =

Scientific classification
- Domain: Eukaryota
- Kingdom: Animalia
- Phylum: Arthropoda
- Class: Insecta
- Order: Coleoptera
- Suborder: Polyphaga
- Infraorder: Cucujiformia
- Family: Mordellidae
- Subfamily: Mordellinae
- Tribe: Conaliini
- Genus: Conalia
- Species: C. melanops

Binomial name
- Conalia melanops Ray, 1946

Species of beetle

Conalia melanops is a species of tumbling flower beetle in the family Mordellidae, found in North America.
