= Hopewell School (Cedar Creek, Texas) =

- U.S. National Register of Historic Places
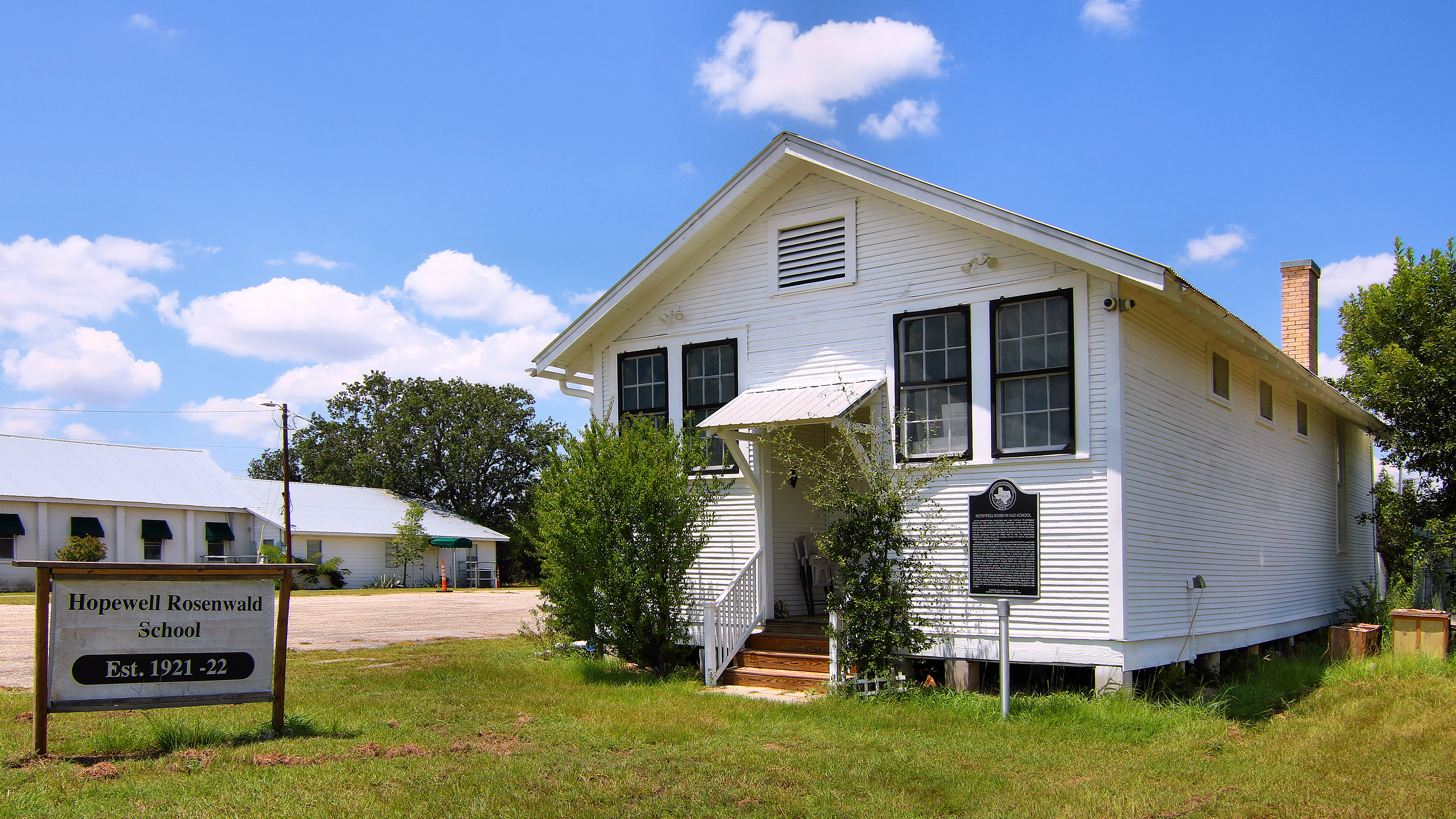

- Location within Texas Location within the United States
- Location: 690 SH 21 W, Cedar Creek, Texas
- Coordinates: 30°5′55″N 97°27′41″W
- Area: 2 acres (0.81 ha)
- Built: 1921
- Architect: Samuel L. Smith
- MPS: Rosenwald School Building Program in Texas MPS
- NRHP reference No.: 15000334
- Added to NRHP: June 8, 2015

Hopewell School, also known as the Hopewell Rosenwald School, is a former African American school in Bastrop County, Texas, United States. that was built in 1921–1922, a time of racial segregation in the United States. The school was listed on the National Register of Historic Places on July 15, 2015, and designated a Recorded Texas Historic Landmark in 2022.

The school was initially funded by a land grant of 1.5 acres and a monetary grant from Martin and Sophia MacDonald of Bastrop County, who were enslaved as children. The school was also paid for through public funds, money raised from the African American community, and a monetary grant from the Rosenwald Fund. The school opened in 1922 and closed in the late 1950s, when the United States Supreme Court ruling in Brown v. Board of Education found that state laws establishing racial segregation in public schools were unconstitutional, rendering the school obsolete.

== Restoration ==
After the school closed, the building fell into disrepair. In 2015, Bluebonnet Electric Cooperative awarded a $50,000 capital grant to the Hopewell Rosenwald School Project to help convert the building into a community center. The project to restore the school was under the fiscal umbrella of American YouthWorks

== See also ==
- National Register of Historic Places listings in Bastrop County, Texas
