= Paraconalia =

Scientific classification
- Kingdom: Animalia
- Phylum: Arthropoda
- Class: Insecta
- Order: Coleoptera
- Suborder: Polyphaga
- Infraorder: Cucujiformia
- Family: Mordellidae
- Subfamily: Mordellinae
- Tribe: Conaliini
- Genus: Paraconalia; LeConte, 1852
- Species: P. brasiliensis

Binomial name
- Paraconalia brasiliensis Ermisch, 1968

Genus of beetles

Paraconalia is a genus of tumbling flower beetles in the family Mordellidae. This genus has a single species, Paraconalia brasiliensis, found in South America.
