= McKinney Roughs Nature Park =

Protected area in Texas, United States

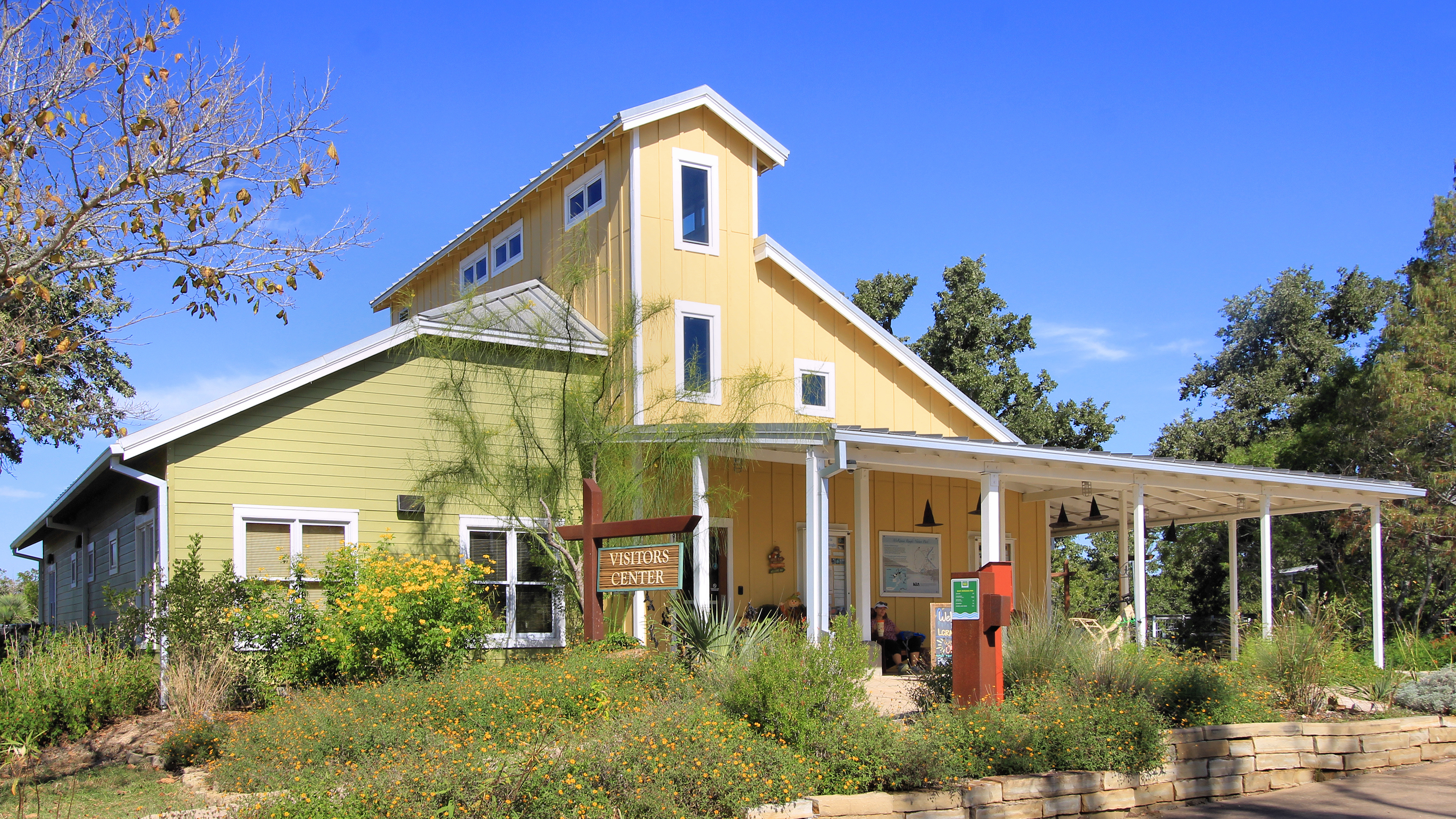
- Visitors center at McKinney Roughs Nature Park
- Interactive map of McKinney Roughs Nature Park
- Type: Nature park; Archaeological site
- Location: 1884 State Hwy 71 West, Cedar Creek, Texas, US
- Nearest city: Bastrop and Austin, Texas, US
- Coordinates: 30°08′42″N 97°27′36″W
- Area: 1,140 acres (460 ha)
- Opened: 1998 (28 years ago)
- Etymology: Named after Thomas F. McKinney
- Owner: Lower Colorado River Authority (LCRA)
- Status: Open
- Paths: 28.3 km (17.6 mi) trail system
- Water: Colorado River
- Website: McKinney Roughs Nature Park

McKinney Roughs Nature Park is a 1,140-acre (460 ha) nature park and archaeological site in Cedar Creek, Texas, United States. Located about 13 mi (21 km) east of Austin and next to the Colorado River, the park features 17.6 mi (28.3 km) of trails for hiking, mountain biking, and horseback riding. The park is owned and managed by the Lower Colorado River Authority (LCRA). During the late Archaic Period, around 2,100 years ago, McKinney Roughs served as a camping ground for prehistoric hunter-gatherers. In the 1850s, the land was owned by a ranching family that were early settlers of Texas. Over the years, it passed through various owners until it was acquired by the LCRA, which then transformed it into a nature park in 1998.

The park has an unusual convergence of four ecosystems that contribute to its diverse animal and plant life. Within McKinney Roughs and the broader Lost Pines forest, over 250 bird species find habitat, establishing it as a renowned bird-watching destination in Texas. It is also home to several pine trees, mostly notably the loblolly pine, similar to the ones found in the nearby Bastrop State Park and Buescher State Park. Situated adjacent to the 405 acres (164 ha) Hyatt Regency Lost Pines Resort and Spa, McKinney Roughs offers an array of features and amenities. These include an educational science center, a dual zip line, short-term rental facilities for larger groups, kayaking, and guided nature tours, among other offerings.

== History ==
=== Pre-historic era ===
In ancient times, the area now encompassing McKinney Roughs Nature Park served as a camping ground for prehistoric communities at the conclusion of the Archaic Period, approximately 2,100 years ago. Archaeological evidence suggests that at least three times within the period spanning 2,100 to 850 years ago, these communities temporarily camped on the hills of McKinney Roughs. Their activities during these brief stays included deer hunting, collecting mussels from the Colorado River, and gathering various plants from the surrounding area. At the site, archaeologists uncovered 15 features (such as human-made sites), 2,159 artifacts (encompassing tools and weapons), and 1,129 biofacts (unmodified natural materials like shells, otoliths, and bones). Hunter-gatherers at McKinney Roughs had designated specific toss and drop zones for discarding tools or storing them for later use. This practice has assisted archaeologists in comprehending the spatial patterns and activities at the campsite, including cooking, hunting, and toolmaking.

The findings at the archaeological site, known as the McKinney Roughs site (41BP627), were unearthed in 2001 during initial excavations conducted by SWCA Environmental Consultants. These excavations were carried out as part of preparations for the construction of the neighboring Hyatt Regency Lost Pines Resort and Spa. The artifacts recovered from the site were encased in flood sediments, providing a natural preservation environment for non-perishable items, including ancient cooking ovens, stone tools, fireplaces, and mussel shells. However, items crafted from plants, bones, and hides had disintegrated over time. Archaeologists characterized the site as having "developed under relatively rare circumstances", benefiting from the preservation provided by flood sediments. During the Transitional Archaic period, this region experienced substantial rainfall which caused periodic floods near the Colorado River.

The first discovery at the McKinney Roughs archaeological site revealed a compact fireplace with charcoal, charred rocks, and lithic rubble. These findings provided evidence for archaeologists, indicating the presence of ancient campfires. Subsequent extensive excavations uncovered additional campsites from the same Archaic Period. During the exploration, archaeologists unearthed various ancient tools and weaponry, including flake scrapers, raw chert cores used in crafting tools and weapons, and a small dart projectiles known as Ensor and Darl.

Radiocarbon dating of the Ensor points at McKinney Roughs indicates an age roughly between 100 B.C. and 200 A.D., corresponding to approximately 1800 to 2100 years ago, marking the early phase of the Transitional Archaic period. Additionally, the Darl projectile, found at the site, serves as a "time marker," dating the location to approximately 1,100 to 1,150 A.D. The Darl, a transitional weapon utilized by hunters during the Transitional Archaic period, represents an early form of the arrow point. Researchers consider the arrow as the hallmark weapon of the forthcoming Late Prehistoric period, signifying that the ancient people at the McKinney Roughs site were alive during the last years of the Archaic Period. (Note: Due to the absence of other weapon tools like wooden shafts, bows, or atlatls (dart throwers), archaeologists are uncertain how the projectiles discovered at McKinney Roughs were fired.)

=== Modern day ===
In the early 1850s, the land and Windmill Ranch, which now constitutes McKinney Roughs Nature Park, belonged to the family of John Calhoun Wise. Mr. Wise married Cynthia Houston, a close relative of Sam Houston, and they had eight children together. Their descendants resided on the property until the 1950s, after which it changed hands among various owners for over 50 years. In 1990, the land title passed to the Wilton and Effie Hebert Foundation, which subsequently sold the tract in 1995 to the Lower Colorado River Authority (LCRA), a power utility company overseeing the Colorado River. The LCRA expanded its holdings by acquiring two adjoining parcels in 1996 and 1998, culminating in the creation of McKinney Roughs.

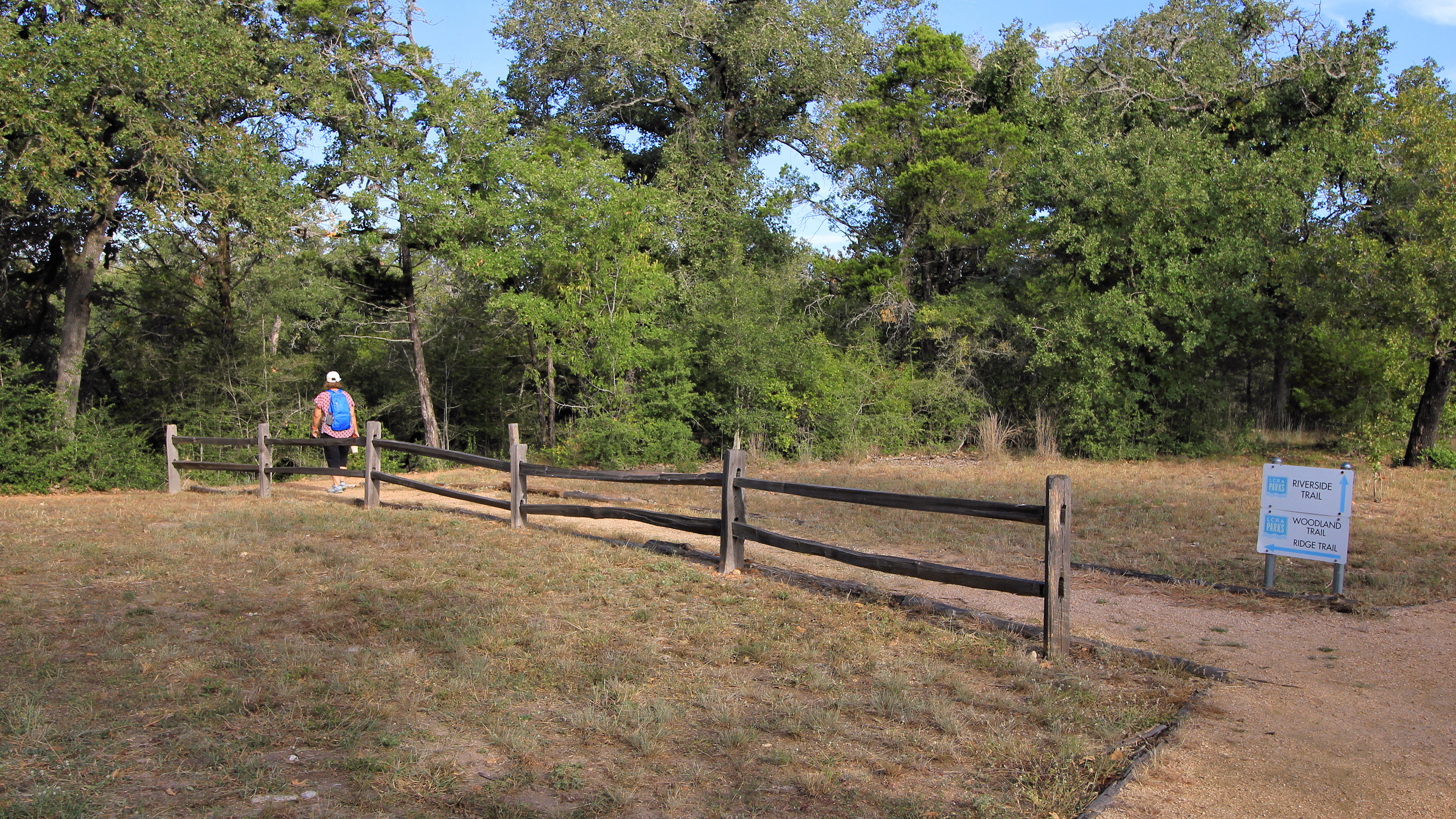
A hiker heads out at the trailhead near the main entrance.

Opened to the public in 1998, the park first unveiled 9 miles (14 km) of hiking and horseback riding trails. The park bears the name of Thomas F. McKinney, an early settler of the State of Texas who had a large influence in the development of Austin and Bastrop. Thomas F. McKinney did not own the land that currently comprises McKinney Roughs, but he managed a lumber mill located across from the Colorado River, potentially utilizing timber resources from what is now McKinney Roughs. Local residents had already been referring to the land as McKinney Roughs for many years before its official designation. The term "roughs" is derived from the challenging local terrain, which posed obstacles to extensive agricultural endeavors and may have served as a potential hiding place for frontier outlaws. In addition to McKinney Roughs, another park in Austin, about 12 mi (19 km) away, is named after him – McKinney Falls State Park.

In 2009, there was a proposal to downsize and relocate the Brackenridge Field Laboratory, a research field lab owned by the University of Texas at Austin, to McKinney Roughs to accommodate mixed-use development. Faculty members opposed the relocation, arguing that the lab's original location was closer to campus and that moving to McKinney Roughs would negatively impact students' learning. They also noted that McKinney Roughs' other activities, such as horseback riding, did not align with the lab's research interests. Ultimately, the lab was not moved.

In 2011, parts of Bastrop County were engulfed by large fires as a result of exceptional drought and record-high temperatures. The fire was the most destructive wildfire in the history of Texas, and burned about 96% of the neighboring Bastrop State Park. McKinney Roughs was spared from the wildfires but utility infrastructure was damaged. The LCRA temporarily closed McKinney Roughs and the two parks at Lake Bastrop throughout the weekend. Several months later, discussions about replantation emerged, and various park organizations were contemplating the installation of pine cone collectors in seed production areas. McKinney Roughs was being considered for this initiative due to its abundant pine cone seed production.

In 2014, Bastrop earned a nomination as one of the top 40 travel destinations in Texas, as per a poll conducted by Texas Highways magazine. The magazine specifically emphasized McKinney Roughs' prime location in the Lost Pines region and recommended horseback riding activities as a noteworthy experience in Bastrop. In 2017, the LCRA implemented enhancements at McKinney Roughs, including the construction of a wildlife-viewing blind, a designated bird feeding area, and a demonstration garden. Later that year, McKinney Roughs underwent an expansion of its trail system, extending it to cover a distance of up to 13 mi (21 km). The majority of these trails consist of dirt paths with diverse elevations, including some that ran alongside the Colorado River.

In 2018, an ozone monitoring station located in McKinney Roughs, operated by the Capital Area Council of Governments, was moved to Bastrop. The relocation was prompted by an analysis indicating that the trees and vegetation in McKinney Roughs were affecting the accuracy of the system's readings. In 2020, the LCRA temporarily closed McKinney Roughs and its two parks at Lake Bastrop during the COVID-19 lockdowns. The closure was a response to shortages in cleaning supplies necessary to disinfect the facilities and mitigate the risk of possible contamination. As of 2024, the outdoor and group activities offered at McKinney Roughs continue to draw visitors and residents of Bastrop to its park grounds.

== Features and amenities ==
McKinney Roughs is situated on 1884 State Hwy 71 West in Cedar Creek, an unincorporated community within Bastrop County. Positioned along Texas State Highway 71 (SH 71), the park is approximately 13 miles (21 km) east of the Austin–Bergstrom International Airport and 8 miles (13 km) west of the Bastrop. Encompassing 1,140 acres (460 ha), this park is located adjacent to the Colorado River and is situated within the Lost Pines forest. The park is also situated adjacent to the Hyatt Regency Lost Pines Resort and Spa, a luxurious 405-acre (164 ha) resort that offers amenities such as horseback riding, a golf course, rafting opportunities on the Colorado River, and guided nature tours. The resort acquired the land from LCRA in 2006; however, guests at the resort continue to maintain access to the park's trails. About 2 mi (3.2 km) north of McKinney Roughs' trailhead is the Happy Horse Hotel, a campground for equestrians. At the park's visitor center, there is an exhibit featuring an aquarium displaying several fish species native to the Colorado River.

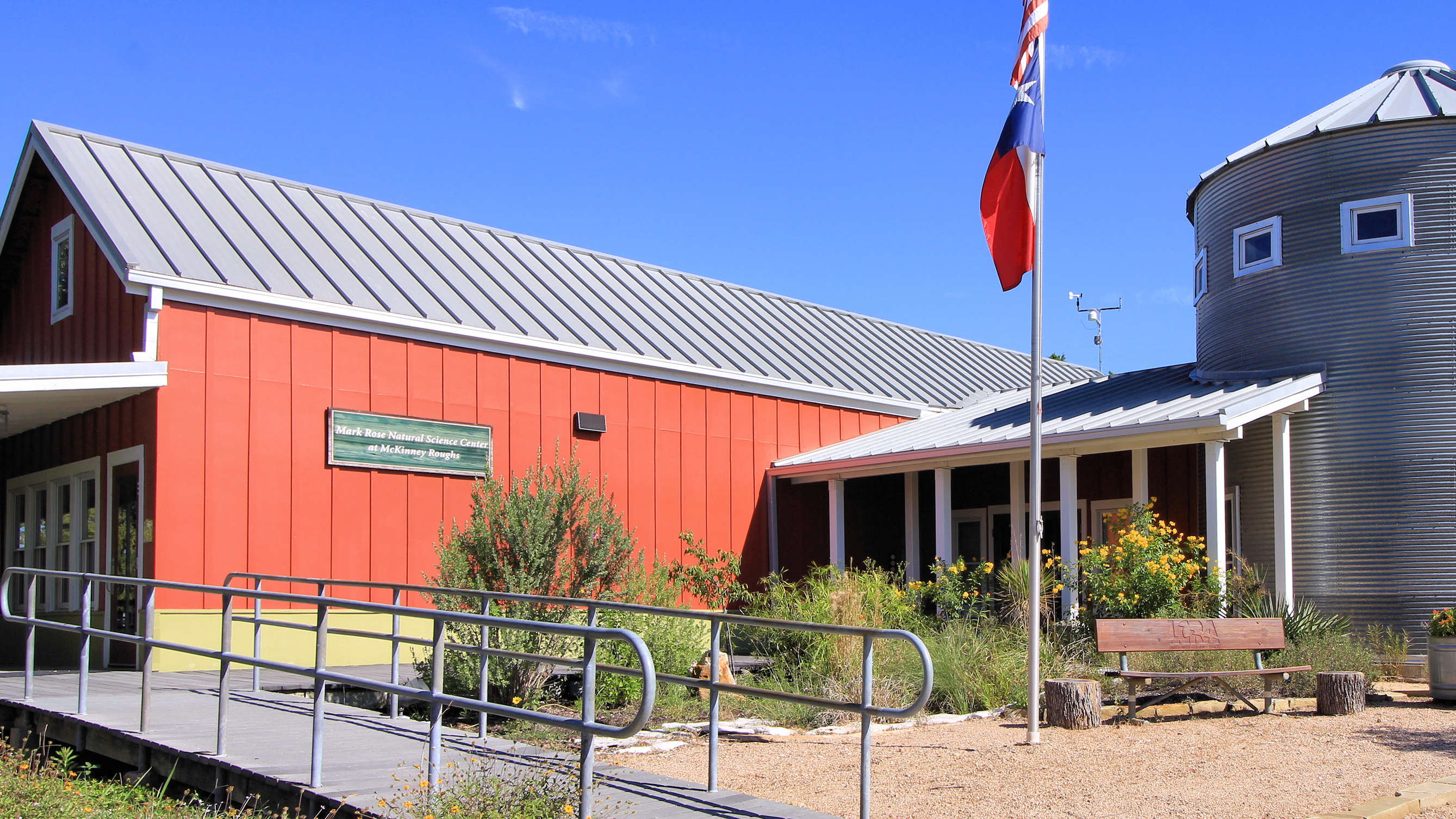
The Mark Rose Natural Science Center at McKinney Roughs Nature Park.

One of the major attractions of McKinney Roughs is the Zip Lost Pines. The zip lines are side-by-side and were designed for couples or group activities. Although the LCRA owns and maintains McKinney Roughs, the zip lines within the park are privately owned and were constructed by an independent company. The zip lines were part of a LCRA initiative to promote increased recreational activities within the park without damaging or impacting the ecosystem. In addition, there are guided kayaking, canoeing, and rafting tours of up to 2 mi (3.2 km) on the Colorado River for children and adults. The park is also home to the Mark Rose Natural Science Center, an educational and recreational facility that promotes nature awareness. The center hosts classes on various subjects, including water conservation, wildlife conservation, land stewardship, and renewable energy. These hands-on activities, administered by the park, are available to both children and adults. The programs at the science center align with the state-level curriculum standards for the Texas Essential Knowledge and Skills (TEKS). These programs are specifically designed to prepare students for the Texas Assessment of Knowledge and Skills (TAKS), a former statewide standardized exam.

Accommodations at McKinney Roughs are available for short-term rental. The bunkhouse is capable of housing up to 10 people for overnight stay. Additionally, the facility features five dormitory floors accommodating a total of 112 individuals. For larger gatherings, there is an amphitheater with a capacity of up to 120 people, along with three meeting rooms. The Colorado Vista Pavilion, an outdoor venue, can accommodate 80 people. The Wildflower Hall is capable of hosting up to 240 individuals. These short-term facilities have been used for meetings, school events, weddings, corporate events, and various other private gatherings.

McKinney Roughs Nature Park has participated in local environmental initiatives, such as hosting events for the Austin Nature Days campaign, which includes educational activities like stargazing, nature journaling, scavenger hunts, and kayaking, aimed at promoting the park's natural resources.

=== Trails ===
McKinney Roughs has a 17.6 mi (28.3 km) trail system that incorporates hike-and-bike and horseback riding trails. It also has 1.44 mi (2.32 km) of shorelines that are partially developed. This riverside trail is frequented among visitors who want to hike along the Colorado River. There are 16 trails in total that vary in size. Some trails involve rough terrain, but they are generally described as beginner friendly. There is also a shorter route that provides wheelchair access. The trails are primarily composed of dirt, unlike the limestone terrain found in many other parks in Central Texas. Motor vehicles are restricted from the trails. Visitors are allowed to bring pets on trails, but pets are required to be on a leash outside of camping grounds for their own safety and to protect wildlife.

Below are the trails displayed on the official McKinney Roughs trails map:

Trail Name	Distance
Bluestem	0.4 mi (0.64 km)
Bluff Trail Loop	0.9 mi (1.4 km)
Bobcat Ridge	1.9 mi (3.1 km)
Bobcat Spur	0.1 mi (0.16 km)
Buckeye	0.6 mi (1.0 km)
Coyote	1 mi (1.6 km)
Cypress	0.6 mi (1.0 km)
Deep Sandy	0.5 mi (0.8 km)
Foxtail	0.2 mi (0.32 km)
Meditation Point	0.2 mi (0.32 km)
Pecan Bottom	1 mi (1.6 km)
Pine Canyon	0.4 mi (0.64 km)
Pine Ridge	2.7 mi (4.3 km)
Pond Spur	0.1 mi (0.16 km)
Ridge	0.6 mi (1.0 km)
Riverside	1.5 mi (2.4 km)
Roadrunner	0.8 mi (1.3 km)
Valley View	0.3 mi (0.5 km)
Whitetail	0.8 mi (1.3 km)
Woodland	0.5 mi (0.8 km)
Yaupon	2.7 mi (4.3 km)

== Nature ==
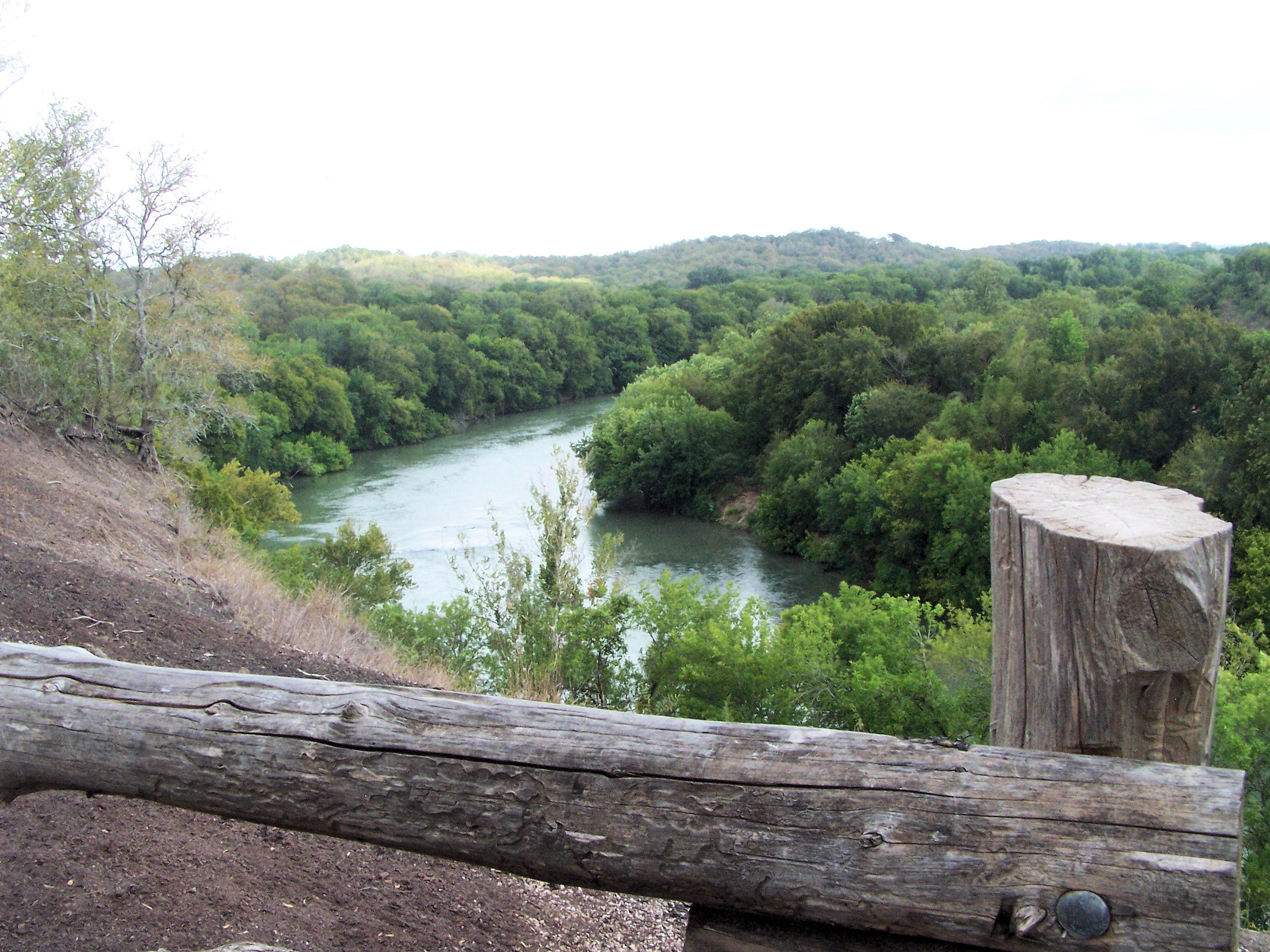
Overlook of the Colorado River from a trail at McKinney Roughs Nature Park.

=== Plants ===
McKinney Roughs serves as a convergence point for four distinct ecosystems: the Post Oak Savannah, Blackland Prairie, East Texas Piney Woods, and a riparian zone. This unusual convergence contributes to the rich diversity of plant and animal life within the park. The park is inhabited by loblolly pine trees, akin to those found in the neighboring Bastrop State Park and Buescher State Park. Additionally, the cedar trees within the park are eastern red cedar, distinguishing them from the Ashe juniper trees typically found in the Texas Hill Country. There are also Hercules' club (also known as the toothache tree) and bald cypress. In the spring months, McKinney Roughs is a ripe zone for bluebonnets, the official state flower of Texas, as well as Texas paintbrush flowers.

=== Animals ===
McKinney Roughs is home to various mammals, reptiles, birds, and amphibians. Common wildlife species observed at the park include gray fox, coyote, eastern cottontail, white-tailed deer, and eastern fox squirrel. The park and other parts of the Lost Pines forest serve as a habitat for a diverse array of over 250 bird species. The park collaborates with the LCRA, the Hyatt Regency, the Bastrop County Audubon Society, Texas Parks and Wildlife Department’s Lost Pines Master Naturalists, and the National Audubon Society to organize annual bird-watching events. Throughout specific seasons, visitors have the opportunity to observe various bird species, including but not limited to northern cardinal, painted bunting, eastern bluebird, Carolina chickadee, ruby-throated hummingbird, black-chinned hummingbird, eastern screech-owl, Carolina wren, tufted titmouse, northern parula, white-winged dove, mourning dove, hooded warbler, several species of birds of prey and the bald eagle—the national bird of the United States. The flower and butterfly gardens continue to attract monarch and queen butterflies from spring through the end of summer.

Bastrop is one of the four cities certified by the Texas Parks and Wildlife Department as having a "bird city" status. McKinney Roughs is recognized as one of the leading birding-viewing destinations within Bastrop County. As of 2019, there are no regulatory restrictions related to threatened or endangered species or wetlands at McKinney Roughs.

== See also ==
- List of Texas state parks
- List of nature centers in Texas

== Bibliography ==
- Estaville, Lawrence E.; Earl, Richard A. (2008). Texas water atlas. Texas A&M University Press. ISBN 9781603440202. OCLC 165957953.
- Llewellin, Charles; Molloy, Johnny (2016). 60 Hikes Within 60 Miles: San Antonio and Austin Including the Hill Country. Menasha Ridge Press. ISBN 9781634040419. OCLC 1099077651.
- Little, Mickey; Little, Mildred J. (2005). Hiking and Backpacking Trails of Texas: Walking, Hiking, and Biking Trails for All Ages and Abilities!. Taylor Trade Publications. ISBN 158979205X. OCLC 1256246488.
- Parker, Mary O. (2016). Explore Texas a nature travel guide. Texas A&M University Press. ISBN 9781623494032. OCLC 1374355984.
- Permenter, Paris; Bigley, John (2016). Day trips from Austin: getaway ideas for the local traveler. TwoDot Books. ISBN 9781493018444. OCLC 1309058662.
- Williams, John (2016). The untold story of the Lower Colorado River Authority. Texas A&M University Press. ISBN 9781623493417. OCLC 910424082.
