= Conalia baudii =

Scientific classification
- Domain: Eukaryota
- Kingdom: Animalia
- Phylum: Arthropoda
- Class: Insecta
- Order: Coleoptera
- Suborder: Polyphaga
- Infraorder: Cucujiformia
- Family: Mordellidae
- Genus: Conalia
- Species: C. baudii

Binomial name
- Conalia baudii Mulsant & Rey, 1858

Species of beetle

Conalia baudii is a beetle in the genus Conalia of the family Mordellidae. It was described in 1858 by Mulsant & Rey.
