= Wyldwood, Texas =

Census-designated place in Bastrop County, Texas, United States

- Census-designated place
- Coordinates: 30°7′48″N 97°27′15″W
- Country: United States
- State: Texas
- County: Bastrop

Area
  - Total: 12.1 sq mi (31.4 km^{2})
  - Land: 12.0 sq mi (31.2 km^{2})
  - Water: 0.077 sq mi (0.2 km^{2})
- Elevation: 509 ft (155 m)

Population (2020)
  - Total: 3,694
  - Density: 307/sq mi (118/km^{2})
- Time zone: UTC-6 (Central (CST))
  - Summer (DST): UTC-5 (CDT)
- Zip Code: 78612
- FIPS code: 48-80350
- GNIS feature ID: 2409632

Wyldwood is a census-designated place (CDP) in Bastrop County, Texas, United States. The population was 3,694 at the 2020 census.

== Geography ==
Wyldwood is located about seven miles west of Bastrop.

According to the United States Census Bureau, the CDP has a total area of 12.1 square miles (31 km^{2}), of which 12.1 square miles (31 km^{2}) is land and 0.1 square miles (0.26 km^{2}) (0.58%) is water.

== Demographics ==
Historical population
Census	Pop.	Note	%±
1990	1,764		—
2000	2,310		31.0%
2010	2,505		8.4%
2020	3,694		47.5%
U.S. Decennial Census; 1850–1900 1910; 1920 1930 1940; 1950 1960 1970; 1980 1990 2000; 2010

Wyldwood first appeared as a census designated place in the 1990 U.S. census.

=== Racial and ethnic composition ===
Wyldwood CDP, Texas – Racial and ethnic composition Note: the US Census treats Hispanic/Latino as an ethnic category. This table excludes Latinos from the racial categories and assigns them to a separate category. Hispanics/Latinos may be of any race.
Race / Ethnicity (NH = Non-Hispanic)	Pop 2000	Pop 2010	Pop 2020	% 2000	% 2010	% 2020
White alone (NH)	1,688	1,595	1,807	73.07%	63.67%	48.92%
Black or African American alone (NH)	192	135	165	8.31%	5.39%	4.47%
Native American or Alaska Native alone (NH)	8	14	23	0.35%	0.56%	0.62%
Asian alone (NH)	17	18	52	0.74%	0.72%	1.41%
Native Hawaiian or Pacific Islander alone (NH)	1	2	0	0.04%	0.08%	0.00%
Other race alone (NH)	5	6	11	0.22%	0.24%	0.30%
Mixed race or Multiracial (NH)	54	46	112	2.34%	1.84%	3.03%
Hispanic or Latino (any race)	345	689	1,524	14.94%	27.50%	41.26%
Total	2,310	2,505	3,694	100.00%	100.00%	100.00%

=== 2020 census ===
As of the 2020 census, Wyldwood had a population of 3,694. The median age was 39.3 years. 23.6% of residents were under the age of 18 and 16.0% of residents were 65 years of age or older. For every 100 females there were 107.3 males, and for every 100 females age 18 and over there were 107.3 males age 18 and over.

0.0% of residents lived in urban areas, while 100.0% lived in rural areas.

There were 1,384 households in Wyldwood, of which 31.5% had children under the age of 18 living in them. Of all households, 46.7% were married-couple households, 24.0% were households with a male householder and no spouse or partner present, and 21.4% were households with a female householder and no spouse or partner present. About 28.7% of all households were made up of individuals and 12.6% had someone living alone who was 65 years of age or older. There were 663 families residing in the CDP.

There were 1,521 housing units, of which 9.0% were vacant. The homeowner vacancy rate was 2.0% and the rental vacancy rate was 8.6%.

=== 2000 census ===
As at the 2000 census there were 2,310 people, 835 households, and 646 families in the CDP. The population density was 191.7 inhabitants per square mile (74.0/km^{2}). There were 884 housing units at an average density of 73.4 per square mile (28.3/km^{2}). The racial makeup of the CDP was 82.60% White, 8.35% African American, 0.52% Native American, 0.74% Asian, 0.09% Pacific Islander, 4.42% from other races, and 3.29% from two or more races. Hispanic or Latino of any race were 14.94% of the population.

Of the 835 households 35.7% had children under the age of 18 living with them, 61.9% were married couples living together, 11.5% had a female householder with no husband present, and 22.6% were non-families. 16.9% of households were one person and 4.1% were one person aged 65 or older. The average household size was 2.77 and the average family size was 3.11.

The age distribution was 27.0% under the age of 18, 8.1% from 18 to 24, 29.2% from 25 to 44, 26.3% from 45 to 64, and 9.4% 65 or older. The median age was 37 years. For every 100 females, there were 96.6 males. For every 100 females age 18 and over, there were 97.9 males.

The median household income was $57,333 and the median family income was $61,088. Males had a median income of $40,500 versus $28,097 for females. The per capita income for the CDP was $20,217. About 4.3% of families and 4.8% of the population were below the poverty line, including 5.1% of those under age 18 and none of those age 65 or over.

== Education ==
The area is served by the Bastrop Independent School District. Most students in Wyldwood are zoned to Bluebonnet Elementary School, while some are zoned to Cedar Creek Elementary School. All Wyldwood residents are zoned to Cedar Creek Intermediate School, Cedar Creek Middle school, and Cedar Creek High School.

== See also ==
- List of census-designated places in Texas
