= Glipodes =

Scientific classification
- Kingdom: Animalia
- Phylum: Arthropoda
- Class: Insecta
- Order: Coleoptera
- Suborder: Polyphaga
- Infraorder: Cucujiformia
- Family: Mordellidae
- Subfamily: Mordellinae
- Tribe: Conaliini
- Genus: Glipodes; LeConte, 1862

Genus of beetles

Glipodes is a genus of tumbling flower beetles in the family Mordellidae. There are at least two described species in Glipodes, found in North, Central, and South America.

== Species ==
These two species belong to the genus Glipodes:

- Glipodes sericans (Melsheimer, 1845) (North, Central, and South America)
- Glipodes unistrigosa Pic, 1941 (South America)
