= Glipodes sericans =

Scientific classification
- Domain: Eukaryota
- Kingdom: Animalia
- Phylum: Arthropoda
- Class: Insecta
- Order: Coleoptera
- Suborder: Polyphaga
- Infraorder: Cucujiformia
- Family: Mordellidae
- Genus: Glipodes
- Species: G. sericans

Binomial name
- Glipodes sericans (Melsheimer, 1845)

Synonyms
- Mordella sericans Melsheimer, 1845

Species of beetle

Glipodes sericans is a beetle in the genus Glipodes of the family Mordellidae. It was described in 1845 by Melsheimer.
