= Rockne, Texas =

Unincorporated community in Bastrop County, Texas, United States

- Unincorporated community
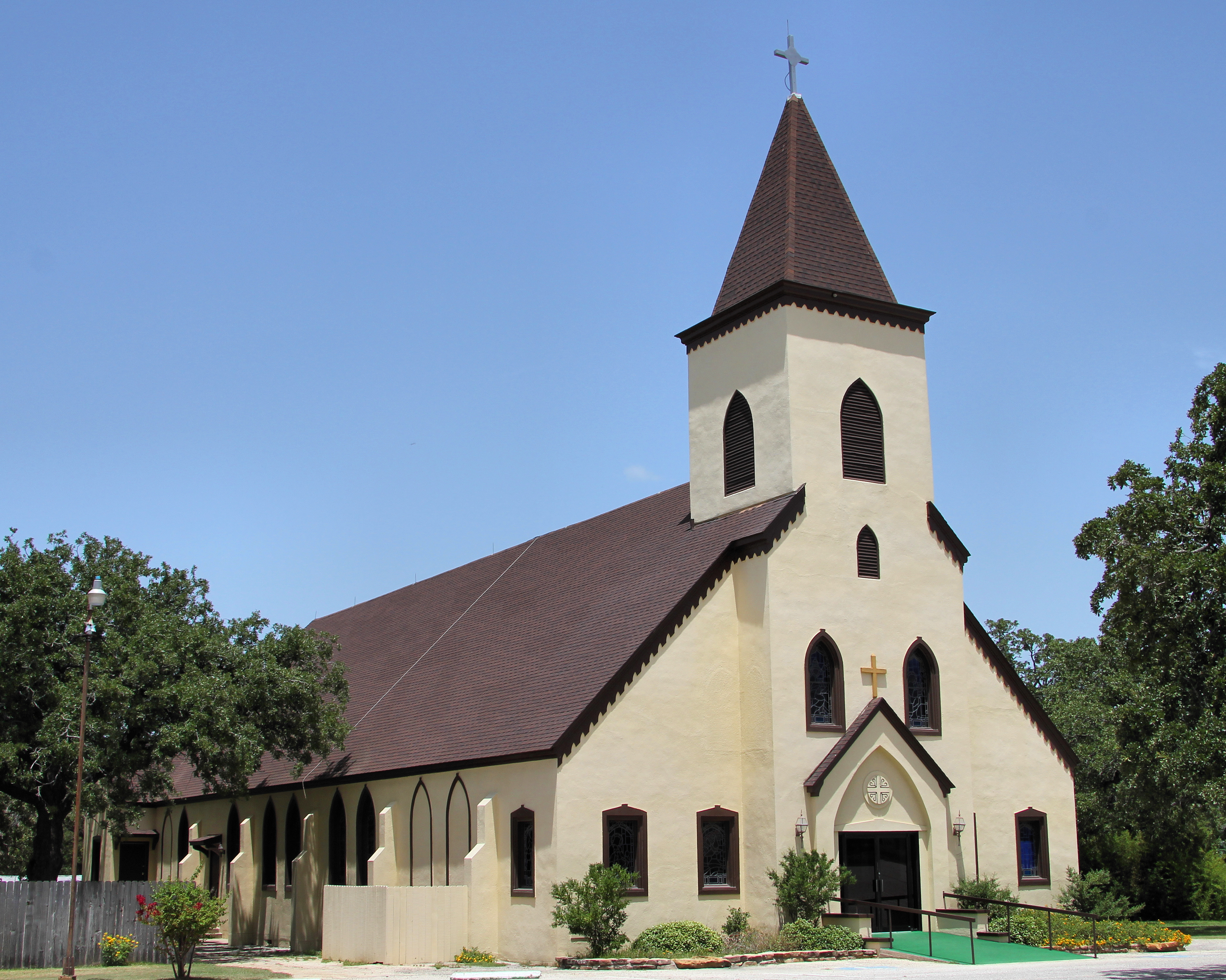
- Sacred Heart Catholic Church in Rockne, July 2012

- Location within Texas Location within the United States
- Coordinates: 29°59′45″N 97°25′52″W
- Country: United States
- State: Texas
- County: Bastrop
- Elevation: 476 ft (145 m)
- Time zone: UTC-6 (Central (CST))
  - Summer (DST): UTC-5 (CDT)
- Area codes: 512 & 737
- GNIS feature ID: 1366735

Rockne is an unincorporated community in Bastrop County, Texas, United States. According to the Handbook of Texas, the community had a population of 400 in 2000. It is located within the Greater Austin metropolitan area.

== Geography ==
Rockne is located at the intersection of Farm-to-Market Roads 20 and 535, 12 mi (19 km) southwest of Bastrop, 20 mi (32 km) southwest of Smithville, 3 mi (4.8 km) north of Red Rock, and 10 mi (16 km) northwest of Rosanky in southwestern Bastrop County.

== Education ==
A school called St. Elizabeth's school opened in 1900 and was changed to Sacred Heart. Its students participated in naming the community in 1931. Rockne is served by the Bastrop Independent School District. Students in the Red Rock area attend Red Rock Elementary School, Cedar Creek Intermediate School, Cedar Creek Middle School, and Cedar Creek High School.

== See also ==
- List of unincorporated communities in Texas
