= Conalia =

Scientific classification
- Domain: Eukaryota
- Kingdom: Animalia
- Phylum: Arthropoda
- Class: Insecta
- Order: Coleoptera
- Suborder: Polyphaga
- Infraorder: Cucujiformia
- Family: Mordellidae
- Subfamily: Mordellinae
- Tribe: Conaliini
- Genus: Conalia; Mulsant & Rey, 1858

Type species
- Conalia baudii Mulsant & Rey, 1858

Genus of beetles

Conalia is a genus of beetles in the family Mordellidae, found in North America and Europe.

== Species ==
These fourspecies belong to the genus Conalia:

- Conalia baudii Mulsant & Rey, 1858 (Europe)
- Conalia ebenina Champion 1891 (Caribbean)
- Conalia helva (LeConte, 1862)
- Conalia melanops Ray, 1946 (North America)
