= Isotrilophus =

Scientific classification
- Kingdom: Animalia
- Phylum: Arthropoda
- Class: Insecta
- Order: Coleoptera
- Suborder: Polyphaga
- Infraorder: Cucujiformia
- Family: Mordellidae
- Subfamily: Mordellinae
- Tribe: Conaliini
- Genus: Isotrilophus; Liljeblad, 1945

Species of beetle

Isotrilophus is a genus of tumbling flower beetles in the family Mordellidae. There are at least two described species in Isotrilophus.

== Species ==
These two species belong to the genus Isotrilophus:

- Isotrilophus erraticus (Smith, 1883)
- Isotrilophus rasnitsyni Odnosum & Perkovsky, 2016
