= Conaliamorpha =

Scientific classification
- Domain: Eukaryota
- Kingdom: Animalia
- Phylum: Arthropoda
- Class: Insecta
- Order: Coleoptera
- Suborder: Polyphaga
- Infraorder: Cucujiformia
- Family: Mordellidae
- Subfamily: Mordellinae
- Tribe: Conaliini
- Genus: Conaliamorpha; Ermisch, 1968
- Species: C. lutea

Binomial name
- Conaliamorpha lutea Ermisch, 1968

Species of beetle

Conaliamorpha lutea is a species of beetles in the family Mordellidae, the only species in the genus Conaliamorpha. It is found in Africa.
