= Bastrop Independent School District =

School district in Texas, United States

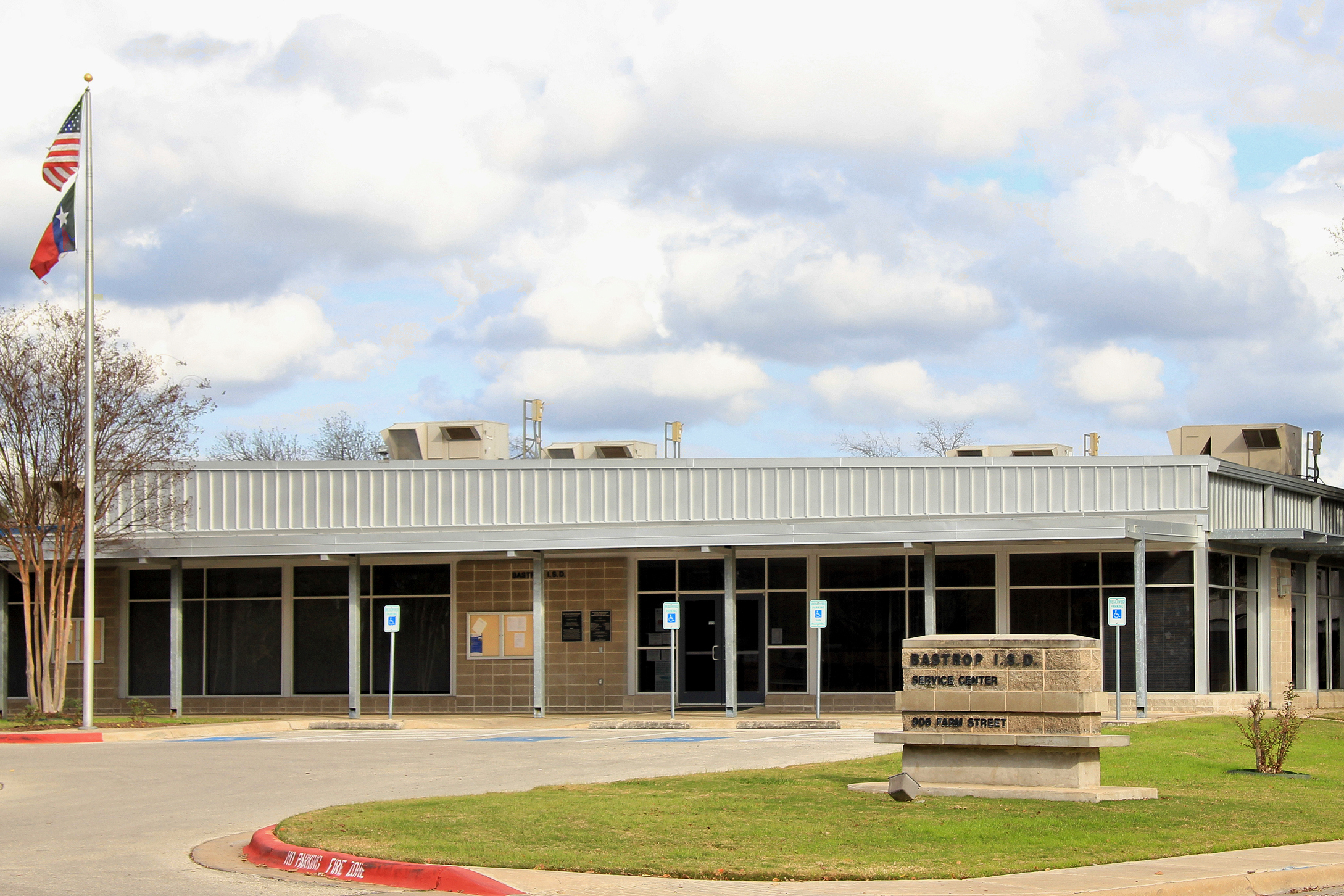

Location
- Bastrop, Texas ESC Region 13 USA
- Coordinates: 30°06′47″N 97°18′55″W

District information
- Type: Public Independent school district
- Grades: EE through 12
- Superintendent: Kristi Lee
- Schools: 15
- NCES District ID: 4809570

Students and staff
- Students: 13,280 (2024-25)
- Staff: 1,175
- Student–teacher ratio: 14.9

Other information
- TEA: Met Standard District
- Website: Bastrop ISD

Bastrop Independent School District is a public school district in Bastrop, Texas, United States. The district serves the communities of Bastrop, Camp Swift, Cedar Creek, Circle D-KC Estates, Paige, Red Rock, Rockne, Wyldwood, and other rural areas of Bastrop County.

== Governance ==
In the 2018-2019 school year, the superintendent was Barry Edwards.

== Finances ==
As of the 2018-2019 school year, the appraised valuation of property in the district was $3,484,178,500.00. The maintenance tax rate was $0.104 and the bond tax rate was $0.044 per $100 of appraised valuation.

== Academic achievement ==
In 2017-18, the school district was rated "Met Standard District" by the Texas Education Agency.

== Schools ==
In the 2018-2019 school year, the district had students in 15 schools.

=== Regular instructional ===
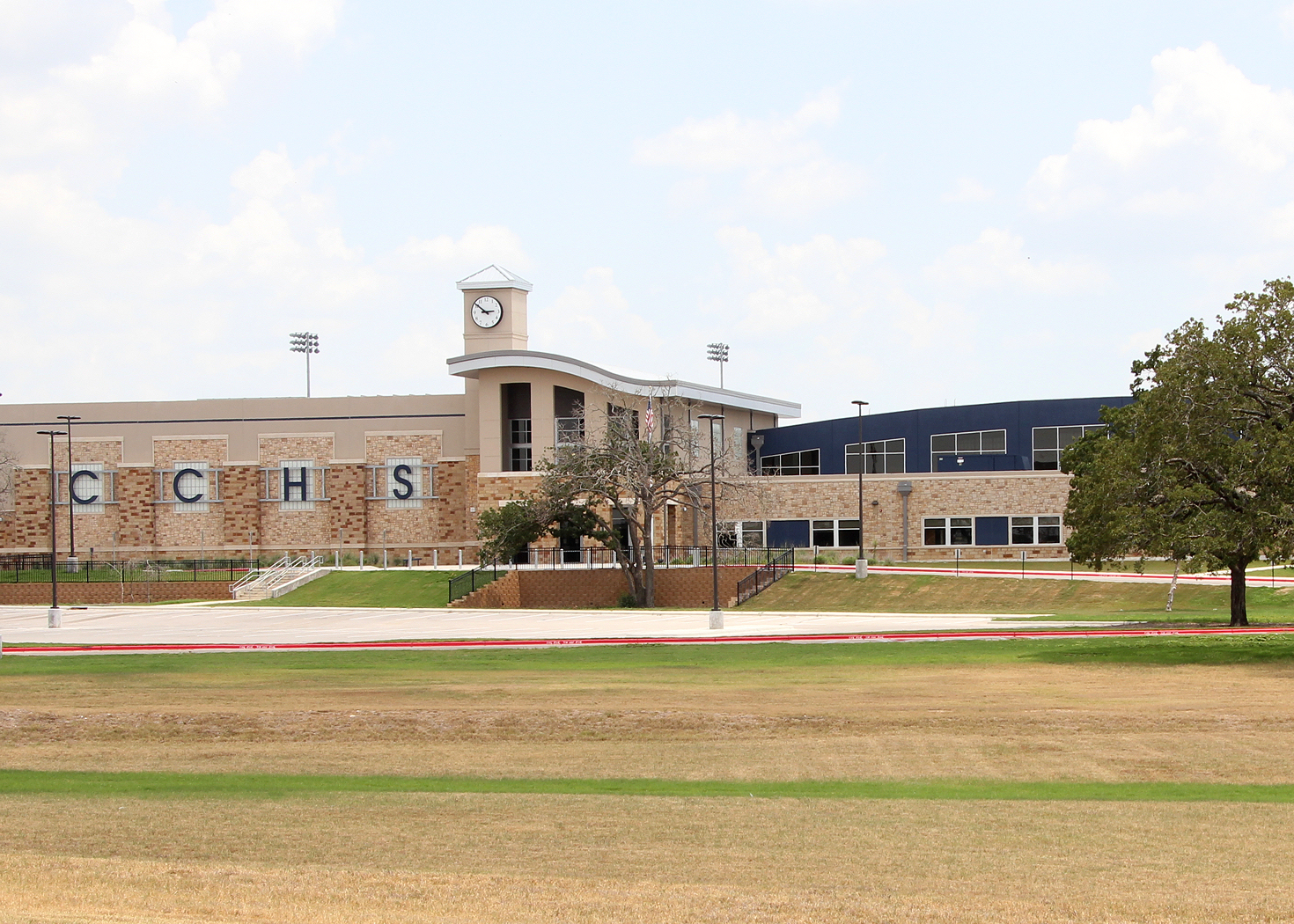
Cedar Creek High School

High Schools (grades 9-12)

- Bastrop High School
- Cedar Creek High School
- Colorado River Collegiate Academy

Middle Schools (grades 6-8)

- Bastrop Middle
- Cedar Creek Middle
- Creekside Middle
- Riverside Middle

Elementary schools (early childhood education- grade 5)

- Adelton Elementary
- Bluebonnet Elementary
- Cedar Creek Elementary
- Camino Real Elementary
- Colony Park Elementary
- Emile Elementary
- Lost Pines Elementary
- Mina Elementary
- Red Rock Elementary

=== Alternative instructional ===
- Genesis High School (grades 9-12)

=== DAEP instructional ===
- Bastrop County Juvenile Boot Camp (grades 4-12)
- Gateway School (grades 6-12)

=== Former schools ===
- Emile High School, a former segregated school, served African-American students from 1893 to 1969. It closed in 1969, when the school district integrated.

== See also ==
- Delgado v. Bastrop ISD
- List of school districts in Texas
