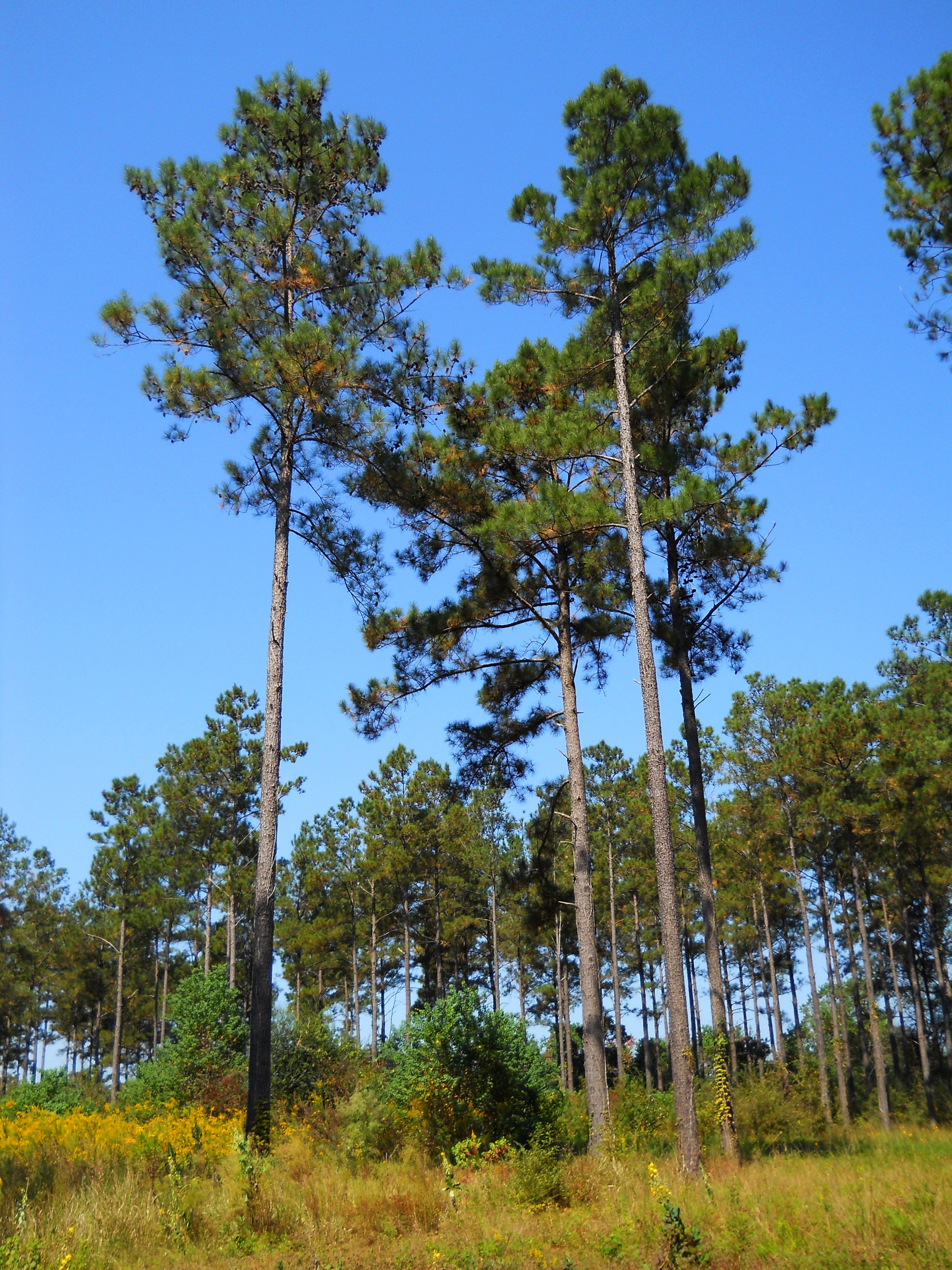
- Characteristic appearance of loblolly pines, south Mississippi, USA

Conservation status
- Least Concern (IUCN 3.1)

Scientific classification
- Kingdom: Plantae
- Clade: Tracheophytes
- Clade: Gymnosperms
- Division: Pinophyta
- Class: Pinopsida
- Order: Pinales
- Family: Pinaceae
- Genus: Pinus
- Subgenus: P. subg. Pinus
- Section: P. sect. Trifoliae
- Subsection: P. subsect. Australes
- Species: P. taeda

Binomial name
- Pinus taeda (Carl Linnaeus, 1753)
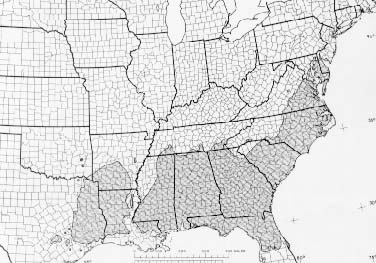
- Native range of loblolly pine (Pinus taeda). Note that this represents the historical indigenous distribution; it does not include modern commercial plantations or naturalized populations further north and west.

= Pinus taeda =

Loblolly pine Temporal range: 0.129–0 Ma Pleistocene – present

Species of conifer

Pinus taeda, commonly known as loblolly pine, is a species of conifer in the family Pinaceae, a pine native to the Southeastern United States, from East Texas to Florida, up to southern New Jersey. The wood industry classifies the species as a southern yellow pine. U.S. Forest Service surveys found that loblolly pine is the second-most common species of tree in the United States, after red maple. For its timber, the pine species is regarded as the most commercially important tree in the Southeastern U.S. The common name loblolly is given because the pine species is found mostly in lowlands and swampy areas.

Loblolly pine is the first among over 100 species of Pinus to have its complete genome sequenced. In March 2014, it was the organism with the largest sequenced genome size. Its genome, with 22 billion base pairs, is seven times larger than that of humans. As of 2018, assembly of the axolotl genome (32Gb) displaced loblolly pine as the largest assembled genome. The loblolly pine was selected as the official state tree of Arkansas in 1939.

== Description ==
Loblolly pine can reach a height of 30–35 meters (98–115 feet) with a diameter of 0.4–1.5 m (1.3–4.9 ft). Exceptional specimens may reach 50 m (160 ft) tall, the largest of the southern pines. Its needles are in bundles (fascicles) of three, sometimes twisted, and measure 12–22 centimeters (4 3/4–8 3/4 inches) long, an intermediate length for southern pines, shorter than those of the longleaf pine or slash pine, but longer than those of the shortleaf pine and spruce pine. The needles usually last up to two years before they fall, which gives the species its evergreen character. Needles are yellowish-green to grayish green.

Although some needles fall throughout the year due to severe weather, insect damage, and drought, most needles fall during the autumn and winter of their second year. The seed cones are green, ripening pale buff-brown, 7–13 cm (2 3/4–5 in) in length, 2–3 cm (3/4–1 1/4 in) broad when closed, opening to 4–6 cm (1 1/2–2 1/4 in) wide, each scale bearing a sharp spine 3 to 6 millimeters (1/8 to 1/4 in) long.

Bark is reddish brown and deeply fissured into irregular, broad, scaly plates on older trees. Branches are reddish-brown to dark yellowish brown.

Loblolly pines are one of the fastest growing pines, making it a valuable species in the lumber industry. The lumber is marketed as yellow pine lumber, and has a similar usage to other southern pines, such as the stronger Longleaf and Shortleaf pines. They are also used as pulpwood. They grow at an average of 2 feet per year. The tallest loblolly pine currently known, which is 51.4 m (169 ft) tall, and the largest, which measures 42 cubic meters (1,500 cubic feet) in volume, are both in Congaree National Park.

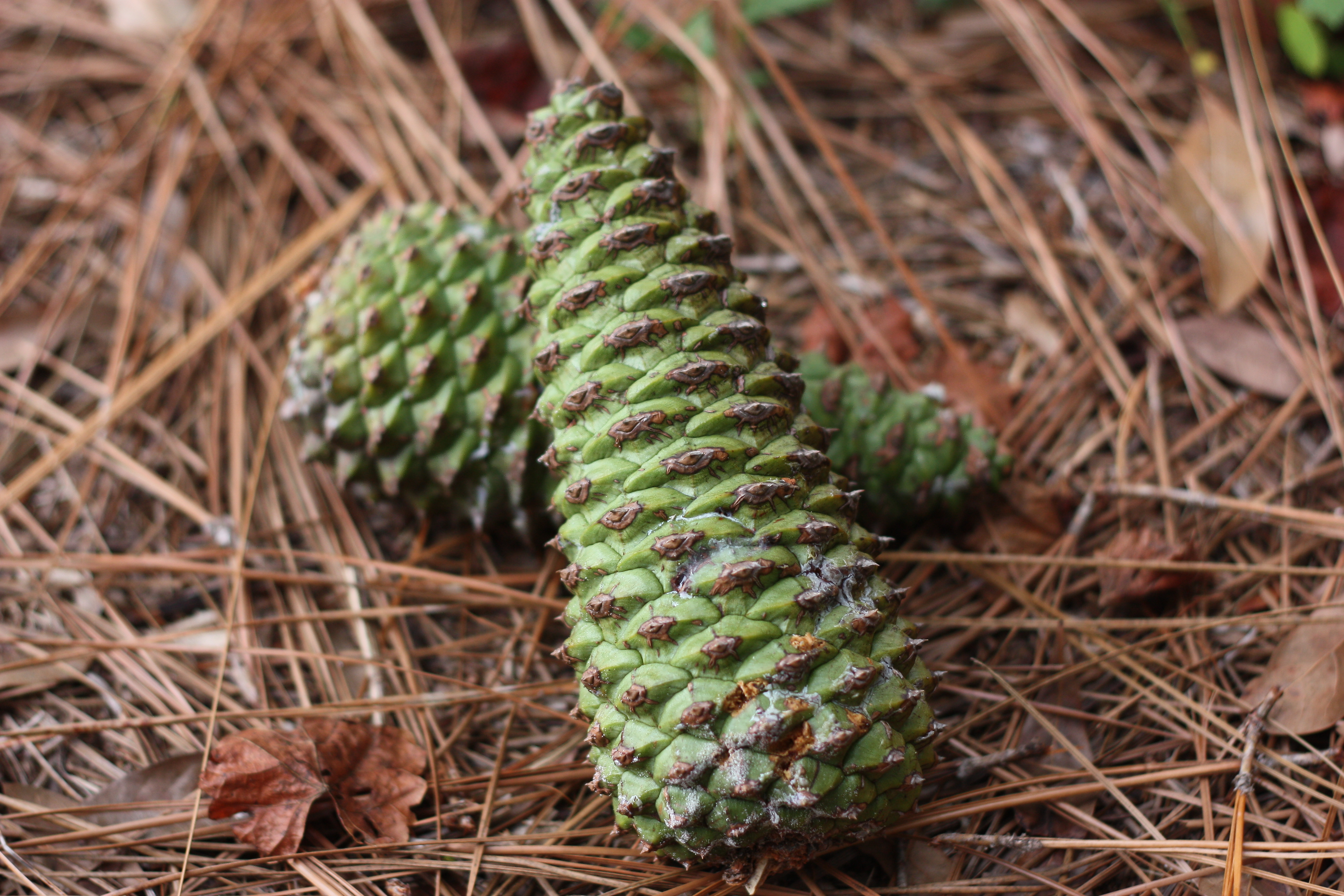
Mature unopened female cones

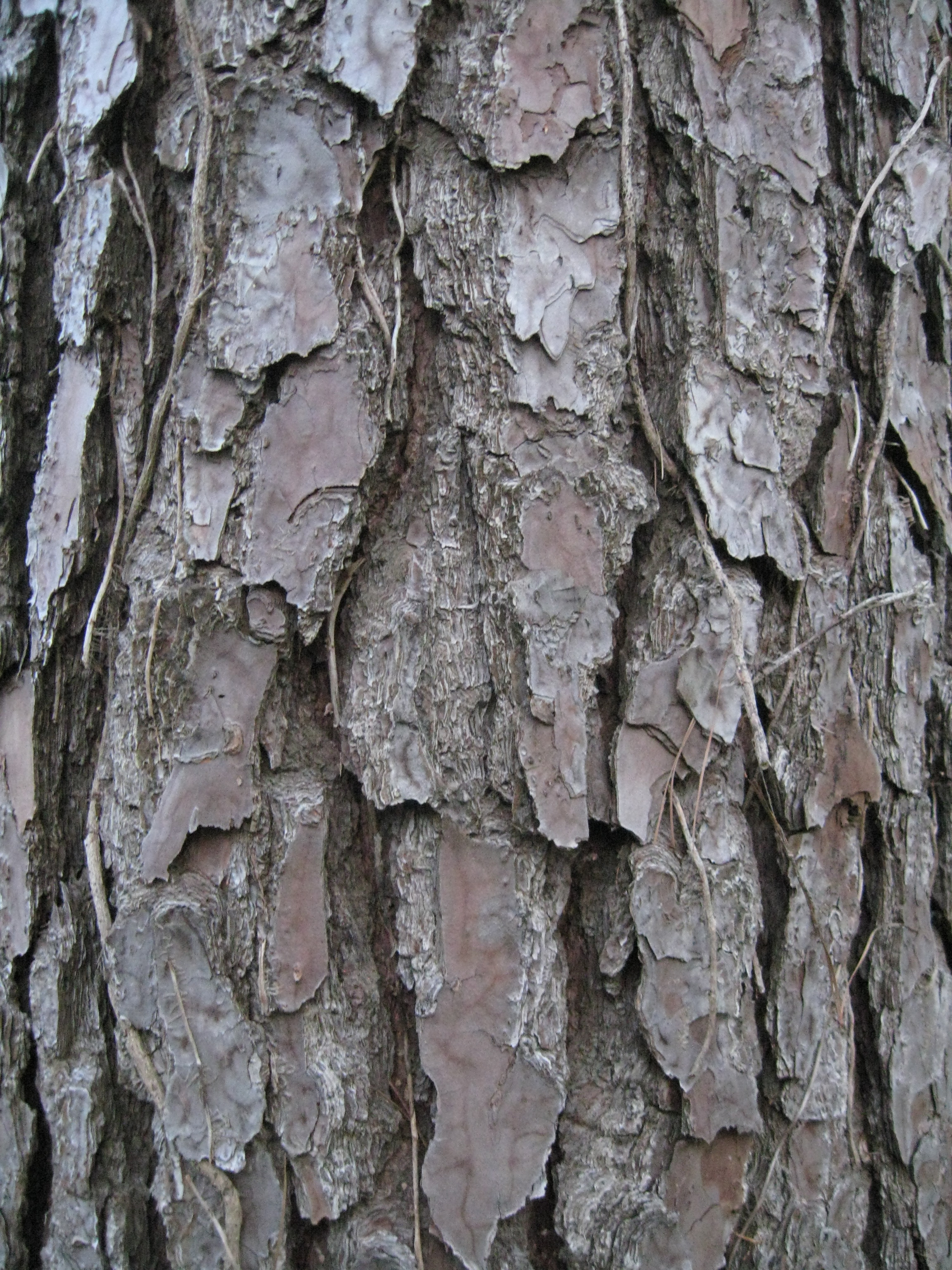
Bark on a mature tree

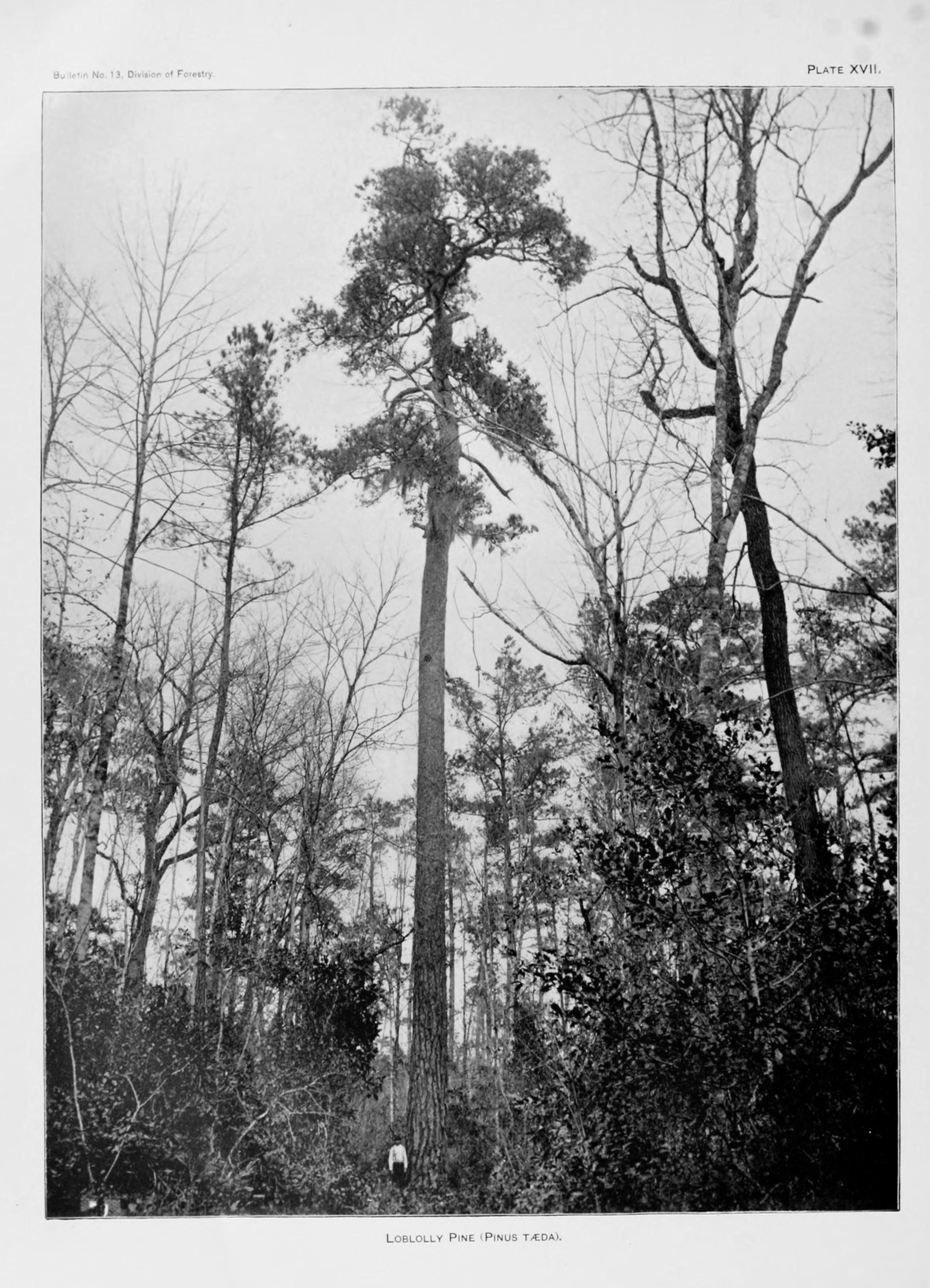
A gigantic old-growth loblolly pine, note human for scale

== Etymology and taxonomy ==
The word "loblolly" is a combination of "lob", referring to thick, heavy bubbling of cooking porridge, and "lolly", an old British dialect word for "broth, soup, or any other food boiled in a pot". In the southern United States, the word is used to mean "a mudhole; a mire," derived from an allusion to the consistency of porridge, and the pine is generally found in lowlands and swampy areas. Loblolly pines grow well in acidic clay soil, which is common throughout the South, so the pines are prevalent in rural areas.

Other old names, now rarely used, include oldfield pine due to its status as an early colonizer of abandoned fields; bull pine due to its size (several other yellow pines are also often so named, especially large isolated specimens); rosemary pine due to loblolly's distinctive fragrance compared to the other southern pines; and North Carolina pine.

For the scientific name, Pinus is the Latin name for the pines and taeda refers to the resinous wood.

== Ecology ==
With the advent of wildfire suppression, loblolly pine has become prevalent in some parts of the Deep South that were once dominated by longleaf pine and, especially in northern Florida, slash pine.

Its rate of growth is rapid, even among the generally fast-growing southern pines. A few select species including moths and beetles' prey upon the young shoots, with one of the most notable being the Nantucket Pine Tip moth. This species bores into the young shoots, consuming the inner shoot tissue. The yellowish, resinous wood is prized for lumber, but is also used for wood pulp. This tree is commercially grown in extensive plantations.

Loblolly pine is the pine of the Lost Pines Forest around Bastrop, Texas, and in McKinney Roughs Nature Park along the Texas Colorado River. These are isolated populations on areas of acidic sandy soil, surrounded by alkaline clays that are poor for pine growth.

A study using loblolly pines showed that higher atmospheric carbon dioxide levels may help the trees to endure ice storms better.

== Notable trees ==
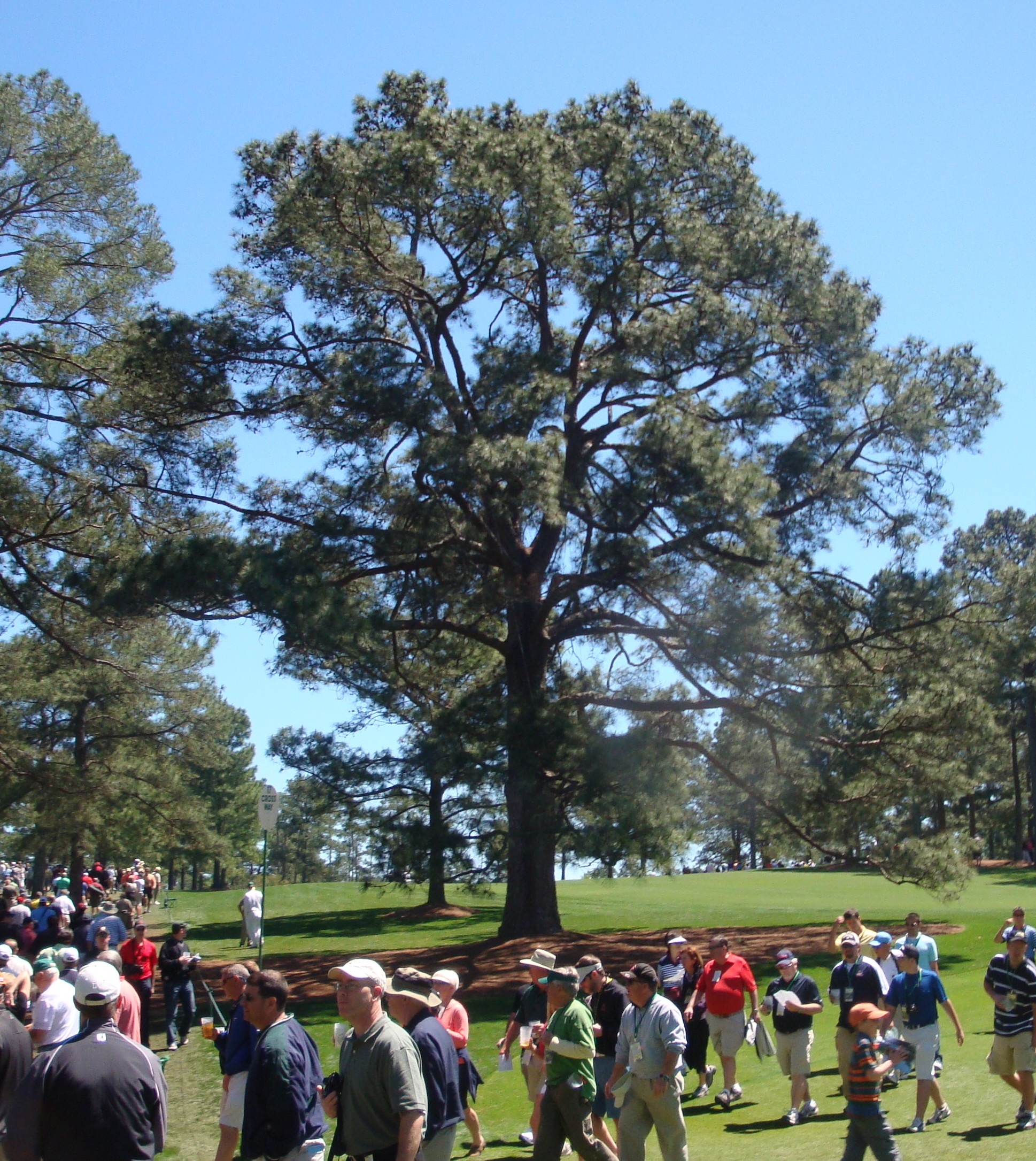
The "Eisenhower Tree" in 2011.

The famous "Eisenhower Tree" on the 17th hole of Augusta National Golf Club was a loblolly pine. U.S. President Dwight D. Eisenhower, an Augusta National member, hit the tree so many times that at a 1956 club meeting, he proposed that it be cut down. Not wanting to offend the President, the club's chairman, Clifford Roberts, immediately adjourned the meeting rather than reject the request outright. In February 2014, an ice storm severely damaged the Eisenhower Tree. The opinion of arborists was that the tree could not be saved and should be removed, which it subsequently was.

The "Morris Pine" was located in southeastern Arkansas; it was measured to have a diameter of 142 cm (56 in) and a height of 35.7 m (117 ft) in 2006. The tree was part of the Levi Wilcoxon Demonstration Forest, an area preserved in 1939 as a typical example of old-growth. The area was itself chosen partly because it contained the Morris Pine. In January 2020, the tree was unable to withstand a severe windstorm due to internal decay and blew down, splintering roughly 12-15 up.

Loblolly pine seeds were carried aboard the Apollo 14 flight. On its return, the seeds were planted in several locations in the US, including the grounds of the White House. As of 2016, a number of these moon trees remain alive.

== Genome ==
Pines are the most common conifers, and the genus Pinus consists of more than 100 species. Sequencing of their genomes remained a huge challenge because of the high complexity and size. Loblolly pine became the first species with its complete genome sequenced. This was the largest genome assembled until 2018, when the axolotl genome (32Gb) was assembled.

The loblolly pine genome is made up of 22.18 billion base pairs, which is more than seven times that of humans. Conifer genomes are known to be full of repetitive DNA, which make up 82% of the genome in loblolly pine (compared to only 50% in humans). The number of genes is estimated at 50,172, of which 15,653 are already confirmed. Most of the genes are duplicates. Some genes have the longest introns observed among fully sequenced plant genomes.

== Inbreeding depression ==
Gymnosperms are predominantly outcrossing, but lack genetic self-incompatibility. Loblolly pine, like most gymnosperms, exhibits high levels of inbreeding depression, especially in the embryonic stage. The loblolly pine harbors an average load of at least eight lethal equivalents. A lethal equivalent is the number of deleterious genes per haploid genome whose cumulative effect is the equivalent of one lethal gene. The presence of at least eight lethal equivalents implies substantial inbreeding depression upon self-fertilization.

== See also ==
- Sonderegger pine, a hybrid between loblolly and longleaf species
