= Conaliini =

Scientific classification
- Domain: Eukaryota
- Kingdom: Animalia
- Phylum: Arthropoda
- Class: Insecta
- Order: Coleoptera
- Suborder: Polyphaga
- Infraorder: Cucujiformia
- Family: Mordellidae
- Subfamily: Mordellinae
- Tribe: Conaliini; Ermisch, 1956

Tribe of beetles

The Conaliini are a tribe of beetles in the family Mordellidae.

== Genera ==
- Conalia Mulsant & Rey, 1858
- Conaliamorpha Ermisch, 1968
- Glipodes LeConte, 1862
- Isotrilophus Liljeblad, 1945
- Paraconalia Ermisch, 1968
- Stenoconalia Ermisch, 1967
