= Cedar Creek, Texas =

Unincorporated community in Texas, US

- Census-designated place
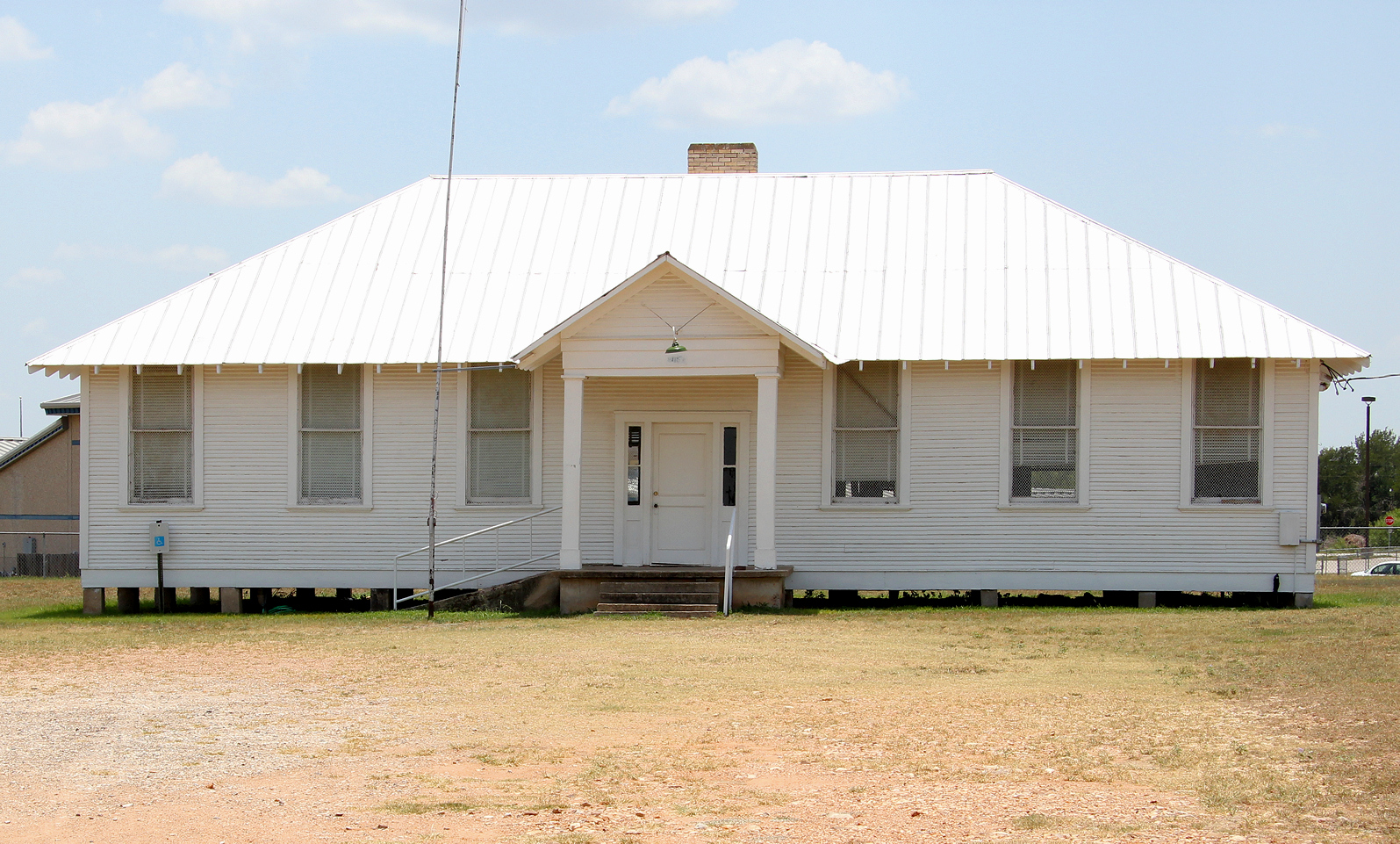
- The Cedar Creek Community Center
- Interactive map of Cedar Creek, Texas
- Coordinates: 30°05′11″N 97°30′05″W
- Country: United States
- State: Texas
- County: Bastrop County
- Established: 1832

Area
  - Total: 18.03 sq mi (46.71 km^{2})
  - Land: 18.00 sq mi (46.62 km^{2})
  - Water: 0.035 sq mi (0.09 km^{2})
- Elevation: 423 ft (129 m)

Population (2020)
  - Total: 3,154
  - Density: 175.2/sq mi (67.65/km^{2})
- ZIP code: 78612
- GNIS feature ID: 2805731

Cedar Creek is a census-designated place (CDP) in Bastrop County, Texas, United States. As of the 2020 census, Cedar Creek had a population of 3,154. It is located about 11 miles (18 km) west of the city of Bastrop. The community takes its name from Cedar Creek, a tributary of the Colorado River that is close to the area. Cedar Creek is home to McKinney Roughs Nature Park, which features natural landscapes and an archaeological site.

== History ==
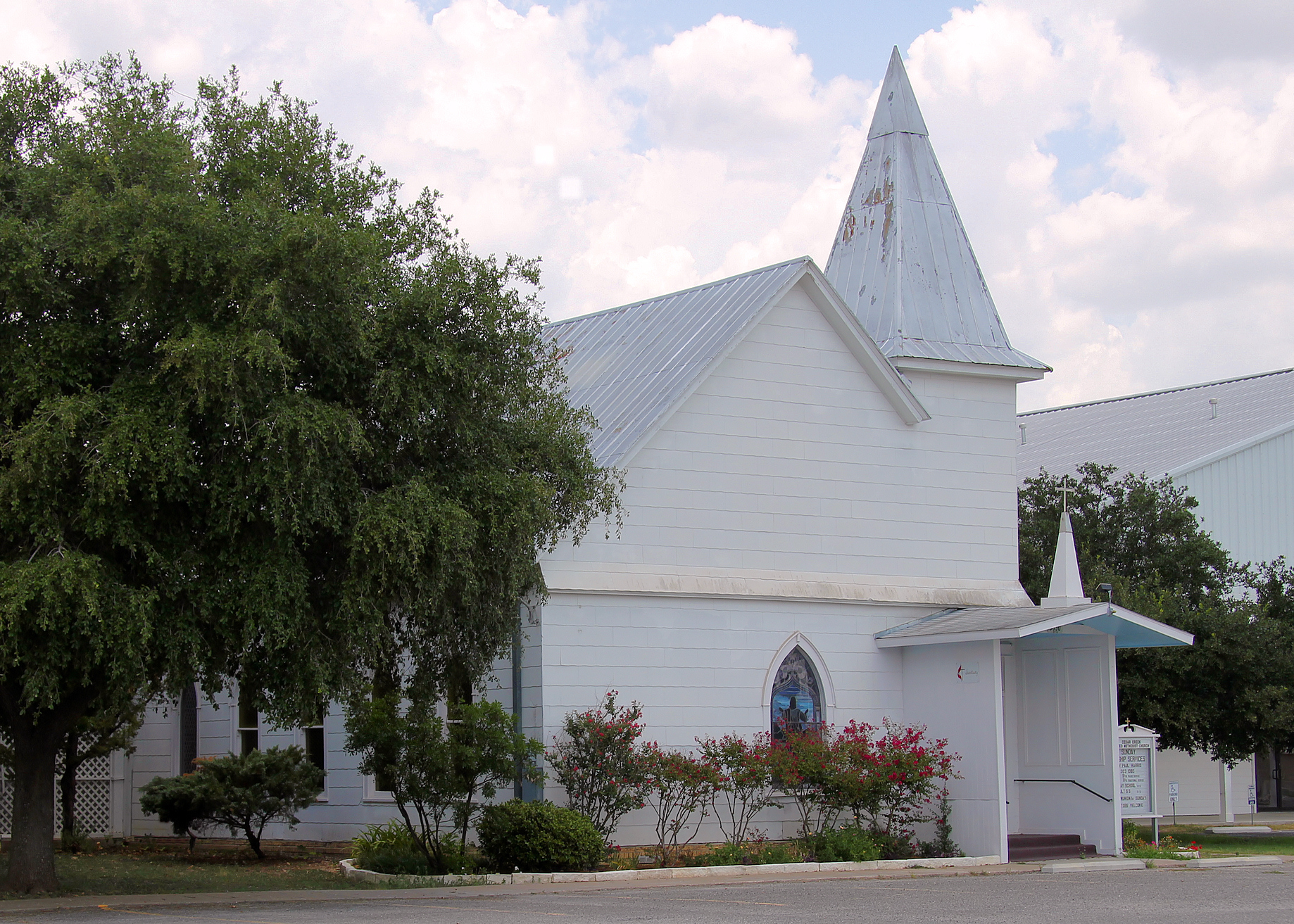
The Cedar Creek United Methodist Church sanctuary built in 1910.

Cedar Creek, Texas, traces its settlement back to 1832, when Addison Litton, a Missouri native, was awarded a league of black prairie on both sides of the creek. With his wife Mary Owen Litton, an Alabama native, the Litton family established their residence. They were soon joined by other early settlers, including Jesse Billingsley and John Day Morgan, who played a key role in establishing the town's first cabin. In January 1842, a Methodist preacher held a large ceremony at the Litton's house, marking the establishment of the church as an important element within the community. A decade later, in 1852, postmaster Elisha Billingsley inaugurated the first local post office. By 1855, the Presbyterian church was organized in the area.

Cedar Creek witnessed an African American population surge post the American Civil War, with their influence expanding through the 1870s and 1880s during the Reconstruction era. In May 1888, Orange Weeks (Wicks) and Ike Wilson, both African American men, were elected as peace of justice and constable for the Cedar Creek precinct. Subsequently, racial tensions heightened in June 1889 during a court case involving an assault and battery charge against Andy (Andie) Litton, a young white man. The court date escalated into a violent confrontation between armed white and black groups, resulting in four casualties—two white men and two black men. Wicks and Wilson were arrested and charged with murder, while numerous African Americans faced arrests for lynching. In the subsequent years, a considerable number of African Americans were either killed or forced into exile from Cedar Creek.

By 1884, Cedar Creek had a population of 600 residents and served as a significant shipping point for cotton and produce. The Central Texas Normal Academy, the local school, concluded its inaugural school year that same year with an enrollment of 101 students. However, by 1896, the population decreased to 250. The introduction of oil drilling activities in 1913 marked a new era for Cedar Creek. In 1928, an oil pool was discovered at the Yost farm, approximately 4 mi (6.4 km) from Cedar Creek. Although not a major pool, the Yost oilfield produced commercial quantities in the mid-1940s. The population reached 300 during the 1940s but gradually declined over subsequent years. In 1984, Cedar Creek had 145 residents and six businesses, and this figure remained unchanged in 1990. In 2000, the population saw a slight increase to 200.

== Education ==
The Hopewell School opened during the 1921-22 school year. It was built to serve African American students during racial segregation in the United States. It closed in the late 1950s and students were sent to Bastrop.

Cedar Creek schools are within the Bastrop Independent School District (BISD), which serves other communities throughout Bastrop County. Students in the Cedar Creek area attend Cedar Creek Elementary School, Cedar Creek Intermediate School, Cedar Creek Middle School, and Cedar Creek High School.

== Geography and landmarks ==
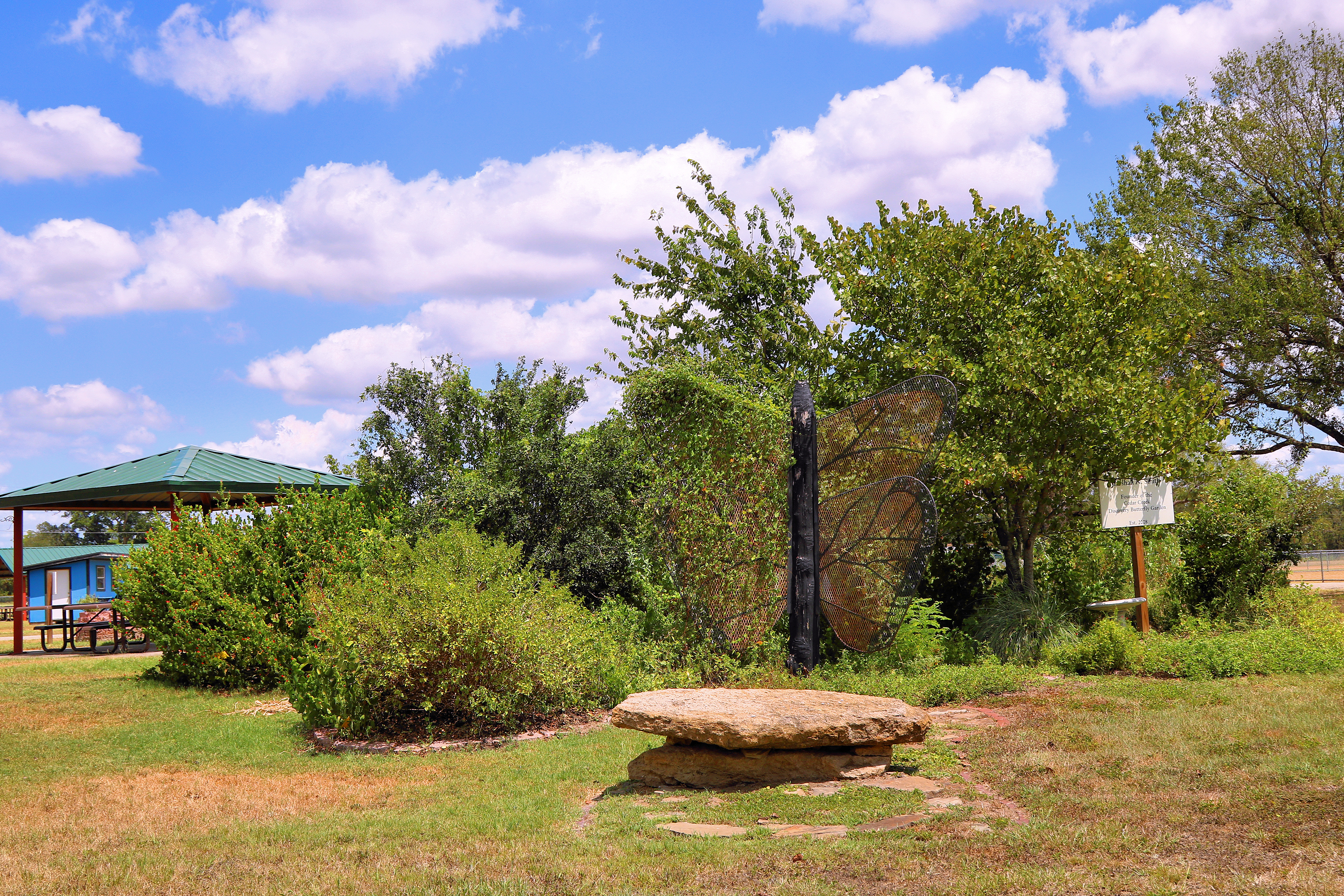
The butterfly garden in Cedar Creek Park

Cedar Creek, Texas, is an unincorporated community in Bastrop County, Texas, United States. It is located 11 mi (18 km) west of Bastrop, the county seat. It is at the intersection of Texas State Highway 21 (SH 21) and Farm to Market Road 535 (FM 535), south of the Texas State Highway 71 (SH 71) that connects Bastrop with Austin, the state capital. According to the United States Census Bureau, Cedar Creek had a population of 3,154 in the 2020 census.

Cedar Creek and Bastrop County are situated within the Piney Woods ecosystem. The county boasts three public parks, with Cedar Creek Park being the inaugural public park in Bastrop County. Acquired from the BISD by county officials in 2008, Cedar Creek Park underwent development and improvements, funded by the Texas Parks and Wildlife Department and the Lower Colorado River Authority (LCRA). Encompassing 37 acres (15 ha), this park offers amenities such as football, soccer, and baseball fields, basketball and sand volleyball courts, 18-hole disc golf course, a playscape, nature trails, historic sites, picnic tables, and a butterfly garden.

In addition, Cedar Creek is home to McKinney Roughs Nature Park, a 1,100 acres (450 ha) nature park and archaeological site with a 17.6 mi (28.3 km) trail system. Adjacent to the park is the Hyatt Regency Lost Pines Resort and Spa, a 405 acres (164 ha) luxurious resort that shares the Colorado River with McKinney Roughs. Along east SH 71 stands Ms. Pearl, recognized as the world's largest squirrel statue, positioned outside a family-owned pecan and gift shop.

== Climate ==
Climate is characterized by relatively high temperatures and evenly distributed precipitation throughout the year. The Köppen Climate Classification subtype for this climate is "Cfa" (Humid Subtropical Climate).

Climate data for Cedar Creek
| Month | Jan | Feb | Mar | Apr | May | Jun | Jul | Aug | Sep | Oct | Nov | Dec | Year |
|---|---|---|---|---|---|---|---|---|---|---|---|---|---|
| Mean daily maximum °C (°F) | 17 (63) | 18 (64) | 23 (73) | 26 (79) | 31 (87) | 34 (93) | 34 (94) | 36 (97) | 32 (90) | 28 (82) | 23 (73) | 18 (64) | 27 (80) |
| Mean daily minimum °C (°F) | 3 (38) | 4 (40) | 9 (48) | 13 (56) | 18 (65) | 22 (71) | 23 (73) | 23 (73) | 19 (67) | 13 (55) | 8 (47) | 3 (38) | 13 (56) |
| Average precipitation mm (inches) | 64 (2.5) | 64 (2.5) | 76 (3) | 58 (2.3) | 110 (4.5) | 91 (3.6) | 58 (2.3) | 51 (2) | 76 (3) | 99 (3.9) | 84 (3.3) | 66 (2.6) | 900 (35.5) |
Source: Weatherbase

== Demographics ==
Historical population
| Census | Pop. | Note | %± |
|---|---|---|---|
| 2020 | 3,154 | | — |
U.S. Decennial Census; 1850–1900 1910; 1920 1930 1940; 1950 1960 1970; 1980 1990 2000; 2010 2020

Cedar Creek first appeared as a census-designated place in the 2020 U.S. census.

=== 2020 census ===
As of the 2020 census, the median age was 34.3 years. 29.7% of residents were under the age of 18 and 10.4% were 65 years of age or older. For every 100 females there were 108.7 males, and for every 100 females age 18 and over there were 108.3 males age 18 and over.

As of the 2020 census, 0.0% of residents lived in urban areas, while 100.0% lived in rural areas.

There were 902 households, of which 42.1% had children under the age of 18 living in them. Of all households, 55.3% were married-couple households, 19.4% were households with a male householder and no spouse or partner present, and 19.3% were households with a female householder and no spouse or partner present. About 18.7% of all households were made up of individuals, and 8.0% had someone living alone who was 65 years of age or older.

There were 971 housing units, of which 7.1% were vacant. The homeowner vacancy rate was 1.8% and the rental vacancy rate was 2.5%.

Cedar Creek, Texas – Racial and ethnic composition Note: the US Census treats Hispanic/Latino as an ethnic category. This table excludes Latinos from the racial categories and assigns them to a separate category. Hispanics/Latinos may be of any race.
| Race / Ethnicity (NH = Non-Hispanic) | Pop 2020 | % 2020 |
|---|---|---|
| White alone (NH) | 893 | 28.31% |
| Black or African American alone (NH) | 136 | 4.31% |
| Native American or Alaska Native alone (NH) | 14 | 0.44% |
| Asian alone (NH) | 16 | 0.51% |
| Pacific Islander alone (NH) | 0 | 0.00% |
| Other race alone (NH) | 16 | 0.51% |
| Mixed race or Multiracial (NH) | 89 | 2.82% |
| Hispanic or Latino (any race) | 1,990 | 63.09% |
| Total | 3,154 | 100.00% |

== See also ==
- List of unincorporated communities in Texas

== Bibliography ==
- Moore, Bill (1977). Bastrop County, 1691–1900. Nortex Press. ISBN 089015127X.
- Finch, Jackie Sheckler; Permenter, Paris; Bigley, John (2022). Day Trips from Austin: Getaway Ideas for the Local Traveler. Rowman & Littlefield. ISBN 9781493065820. OCLC 1334890202.
- Texas Secretary of State (2000). Texas Register. Vol. 25. Austin, Texas: Office of the Secretary of State. OCLC 2309724.
- Zelade, Richard (2011). Lone Star Travel Guide to Central Texas. Taylor Trade Publications. ISBN 9781589796089. OCLC 1050358656.
