= Emile School =

Coordinates: 30.1068°N 97.3112°W

Emile High School

Information
- Opened: 1893
- Closed: 1969
- Grades: 1-12
- Mascot: Lion
- Last updated: 29 December 2017

Emile School or Emile High School was a segregated high school for African-American students in Bastrop, Texas. A part of the Bastrop Independent School District, it opened in 1893. The school, named after the book Emile, or On Education, housed grades 1-12. The lion was the school's mascot.

== History ==
Emile Elementary School the building was a two-story structure on a 4-acre (1.6 ha) plot of land in an African-American area of Bastrop. The lower grades were in four classrooms on the first floor and the upper grades were in two classrooms on the second floor. In the late 1940s a new building opened, and it received brick additions about a decade later. Due to racial integration, it closed in 1969, with students going to Bastrop High School. The building was repurposed for grades 4–5; originally it had a new name, but it was reconfigured to be a grade K-5 school by 1988, when it returned to being named "Emile".

Notable alumni include, Louis Edwin Fry Sr..
