= Cedar Creek High School (Texas) =

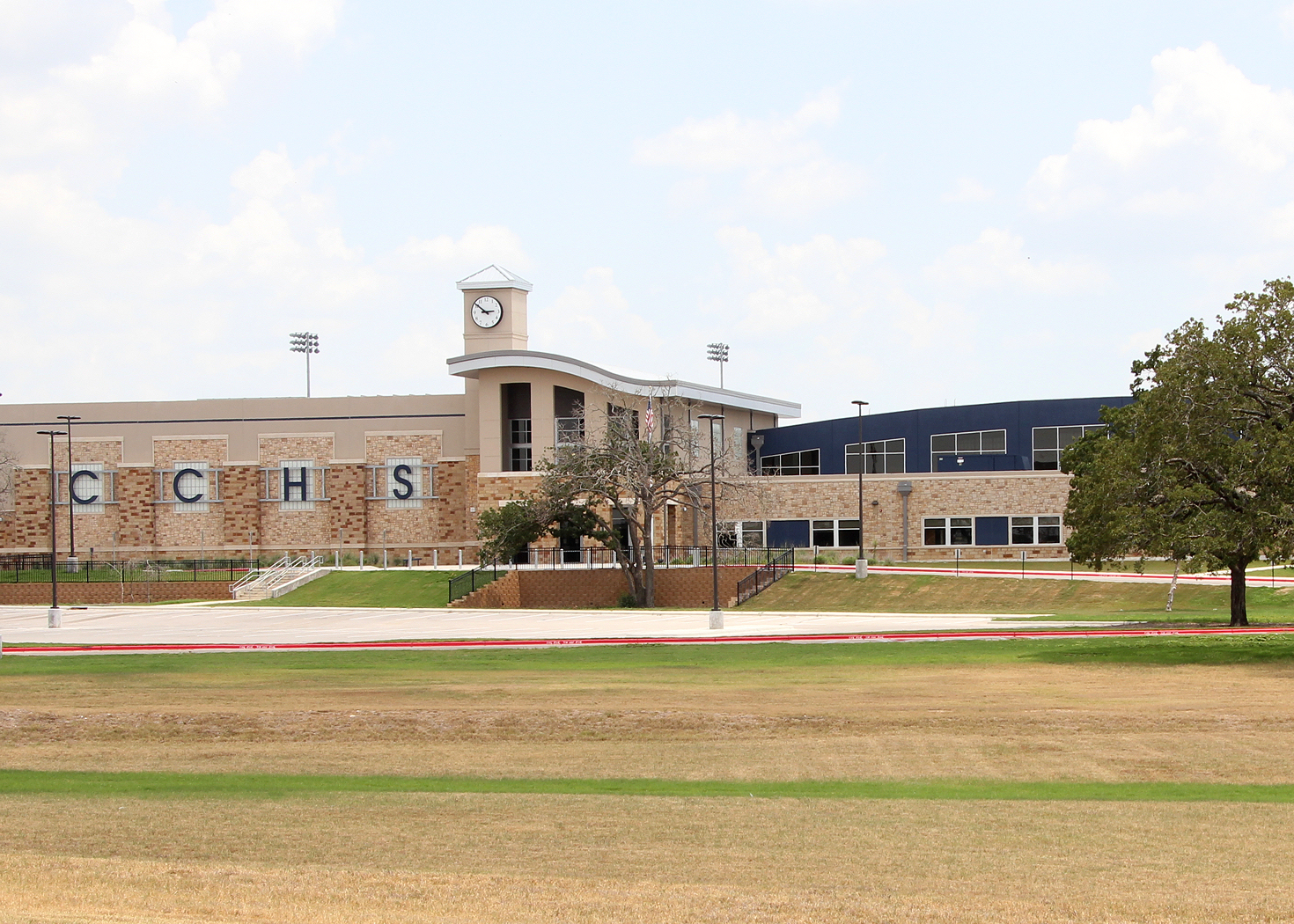

Location
- 793 Union Chapel Road; Cedar Creek, Bastrop County, Texas 78612; United States; 30.1384°N 97.4715°W

Information
- School type: Public, high school
- Established: 2010
- Locale: Rural: Distant
- School district: Bastrop ISD
- NCES School ID: 480957012272
- Principal: Kasie Stagman
- Staff: 124.94 (on an FTE basis)
- Grades: 9–12
- Enrollment: 2,159 (2025-2026)
- Student to teacher ratio: 15.99
- Colors: Royal blue, black, & white
- Athletics conference: UIL Class 5A
- Mascot: Eagles
- Website: Cedar Creek High School

Cedar Creek High School is a public high school located in Cedar Creek, Texas, United States, and classified as a 5A school by the University Interscholastic League (UIL). It is part of the Bastrop Independent School District in Bastrop County. During 2022–2023, Cedar Creek High School had an enrollment of 2,002 students and a student to teacher ratio of 17.01. The school received an overall rating of "C" from the Texas Education Agency for the 2024–2025 school year.

== Communities served ==
Communities served by the school: Cedar Creek, Red Rock, Rockne, and Wyldwood.

== Campus ==
Facilities:

- 1500 student capacity (with plan for future expansion to 2300 students)
- Competition gym, practice gym, field house and locker rooms
- Cafetorium with stage
- Fine arts facilities including band hall, drama, choir, dance, visual arts
- "Main Street" common areas including offices, library/media center, student services, and Career and Technology classes
- Four academic learning communities with satellite offices, common areas and teacher workrooms
- Football field, softball field, baseball field, soccer field, eight tennis courts

== Athletics ==
The Cedar Creek Eagles compete in these sports:

- Baseball
- Basketball
- Cross country
- Football
- Golf
- Powerlifting
- Soccer
- Softball
- Tennis
- Track and field
- Volleyball

== Clubs and organizations ==
The Cedar Creek Eagles compete and participate in the following clubs:

Anime Club, Art Club, Ballet Folklorico, Eaglettes (Drill Team), Cedar Creek FFA (CCHS FFA), Chess Club, Debate Club, Fellowship of Christian Athletes (FCA), Gay Straight Alliance (GSA), Health Occupation Students of America (HOSA), Interact club, Multicultural Club, National Honor Society (NHS), President's Board (P2), Rhapsody in Blue Show Choir, Robotics Club, Student Council, Superintendent Student Advisory Committee (SSAC), and Thespian Society. New clubs are frequently added as niches are found.

== Former clubs and organizations ==
The following clubs were officially recognized and operational at one time, but have since disbanded or are no longer operational:

The Cedar Creek Eagle Editorial (C2E2) Newspaper, Eagle Royal, The Shack (fine dining society) and Swim Team.

== Gallery ==
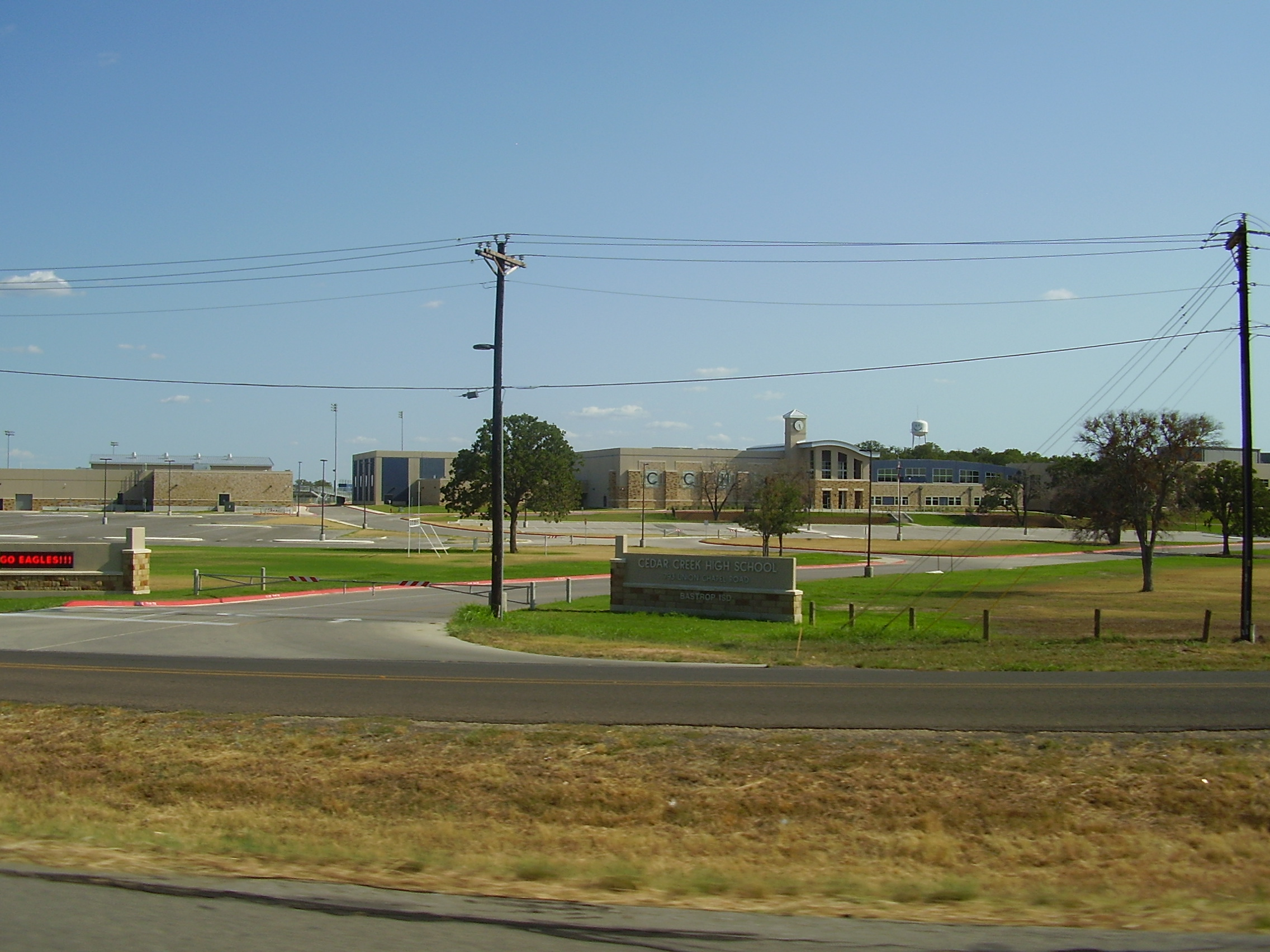

== Notable alumni ==
- Alfred Collins, college football defensive lineman for the Texas Longhorns
