= Red Rock, Texas =

Unincorporated community in Texas, US

Coordinates: 29°57′35″N 97°26′46″W

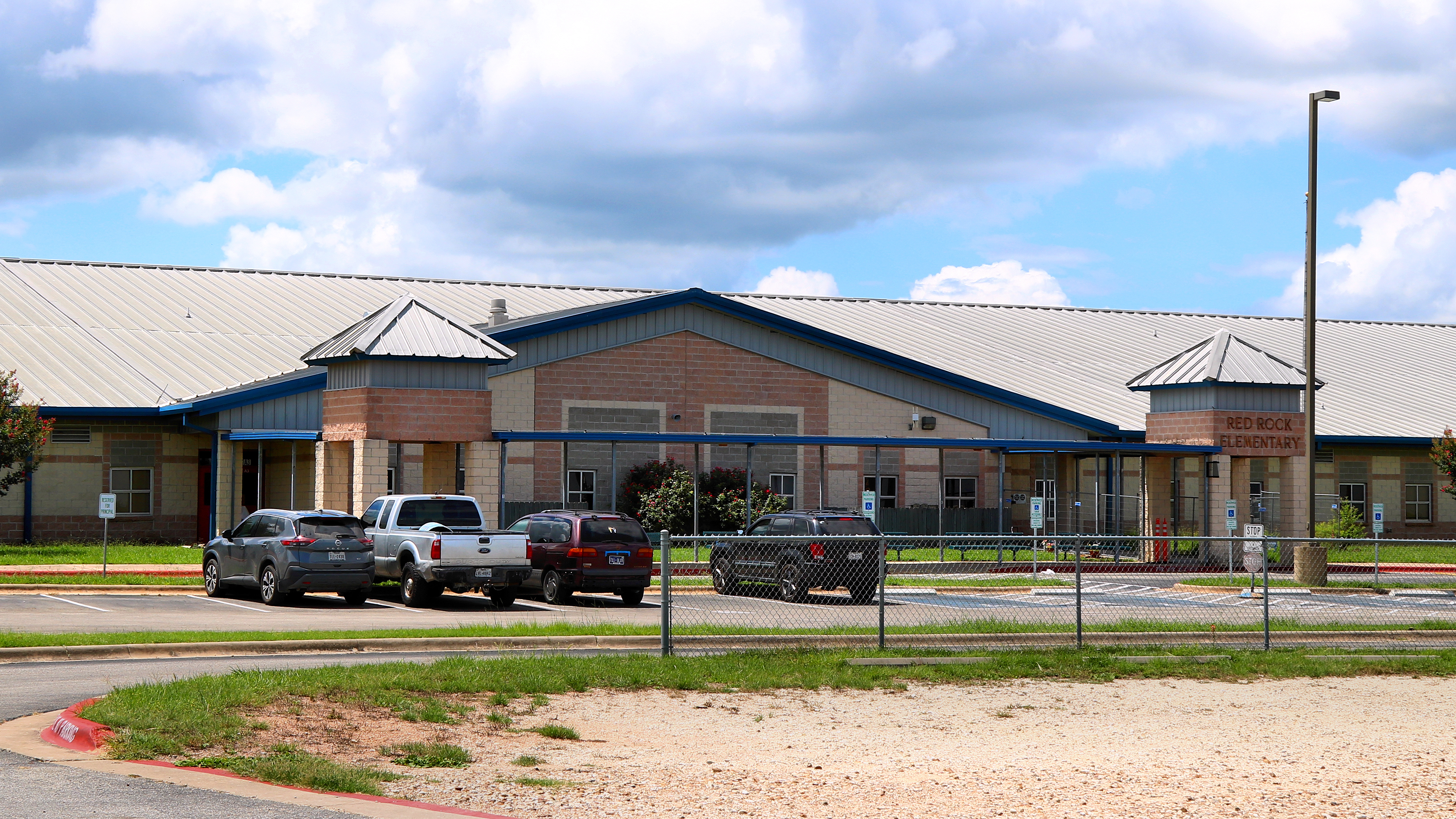
Red Rock Elementary School

Red Rock is a census-designated place (CDP) in Bastrop County, Texas, United States. As of the 2020 census, Red Rock had a population of 410.

== School ==
Red Rock is served by the Bastrop Independent School District. The only public school in the Red Rock area is Red Rock Elementary School.

Students in the Red Rock area attend Red Rock Elementary School, Cedar Creek Intermediate School, Cedar Creek Middle School, and Cedar Creek High School.

== Climate ==
Climate is characterized by relatively high temperatures and evenly distributed precipitation throughout the year. The Köppen Climate Classification subtype for this climate is "Cfa" (Humid Subtropical Climate).

Climate data for Red Rock, Texas
Month	Jan	Feb	Mar	Apr	May	Jun	Jul	Aug	Sep	Oct	Nov	Dec	Year
Mean daily maximum °C (°F)	16 (60)	18 (64)	22 (72)	26 (79)	29 (84)	33 (91)	35 (95)	36 (96)	32 (90)	28 (82)	22 (71)	17 (63)	26 (79)
Mean daily minimum °C (°F)	3 (37)	4 (40)	9 (48)	13 (55)	17 (63)	21 (69)	22 (71)	21 (70)	18 (65)	13 (56)	8 (46)	4 (39)	13 (55)
Average precipitation mm (inches)	64 (2.5)	64 (2.5)	56 (2.2)	86 (3.4)	130 (5)	91 (3.6)	38 (1.5)	61 (2.4)	97 (3.8)	110 (4.3)	84 (3.3)	66 (2.6)	940 (37.1)
Source: Weatherbase

== Demographics ==
Historical population
Census	Pop.	Note	%±
2020	410		—
U.S. Decennial Census; 1850–1900 1910; 1920 1930 1940; 1950 1960 1970; 1980 1990 2000; 2010 2020

Red Rock first appeared as a census designated place in the 2020 U.S. census.

=== 2020 census ===
Red Rock CDP, Texas – Racial and ethnic composition Note: the US Census treats Hispanic/Latino as an ethnic category. This table excludes Latinos from the racial categories and assigns them to a separate category. Hispanics/Latinos may be of any race.
Race / Ethnicity (NH = Non-Hispanic)	Pop 2020	% 2020
White alone (NH)	272	66.34%
Black or African American alone (NH)	0	0.00%
Native American or Alaska Native alone (NH)	0	0.00%
Asian alone (NH)	0	0.00%
Pacific Islander alone (NH)	0	0.00%
Other race alone (NH)	1	0.24%
Mixed race or Multiracial (NH)	14	3.41%
Hispanic or Latino (any race)	123	30.00%
Total	410	100.00%
