= National Register of Historic Places listings in Travis County, Texas =

Location of Travis County in Texas

This is a list of the National Register of Historic Places listings in Travis County, Texas.

This is intended to be a complete list of the properties and districts on the National Register of Historic Places in Travis County, Texas, United States. The locations of National Register properties and districts for which the latitude and longitude coordinates are included below, may be seen in a map.

There are 220 properties and districts listed on the National Register in the county, including 2 National Historic Landmarks.

This National Park Service list is complete through NPS recent listings posted October 23, 2026.

== Current listings ==
	Name on the Register	Image	Date listed	Location	City or town	Description
1	1918 State Office Building and 1933 State Highway Building	1918 State Office Building and 1933 State Highway Building	January 7, 1998 (#97001625)	1019 Brazos and 125 E. 11th Sts. 30°16′20″N 97°44′25″W	Austin	
2	All Saints Chapel	All Saints Chapel	August 24, 2015 (#15000543)	209 W 27th St. 30°17′30″N 97°44′23″W	Austin	
3	Anderson Stadium	Anderson Stadium	February 3, 2022 (#100007405)	South of the intersection of Hargrave Ave., Rosewood Ave., and Thompson St. 30°16′12″N 97°42′37″W	Austin	
4	Administration Building	Administration Building	October 21, 1993 (#86003845)	1820 E. Eighth St. 30°16′10″N 97°43′46″W	Austin	
5	Arnold Bakery	Arnold Bakery	January 14, 2004 (#03001416)	1010 E. Eleventh St. 30°16′09″N 97°43′46″W	Austin	
6	Austin Central Fire Station #1	Austin Central Fire Station #1	May 5, 2000 (#00000454)	401 E. Fifth St. 30°15′57″N 97°44′22″W	Austin	
7	Austin Central Library	Austin Central Library	September 15, 2023 (#100009378)	800 Guadalupe St. 30°16′16″N 97°44′44″W	Austin	Now the Faulk Central Library.
8	Austin Daily Tribune Building	Austin Daily Tribune Building	November 8, 2000 (#00001358)	920 Colorado; 30°16′19″N 97°44′35″W	Austin	
9	Austin Fire Drill Tower	Austin Fire Drill Tower	October 11, 2016 (#16000720)	201 W. Cesar Chavez St. 30°15′49″N 97°44′45″W	Austin	
10	Austin Public Library	Austin Public Library	May 6, 1993 (#93000389)	810 Guadalupe St; 30°16′18″N 97°44′45″W	Austin	
11	Austin US Courthouse	Austin US Courthouse	April 25, 2001 (#01000432)	200 West Eighth St. 30°16′14″N 97°44′38″W	Austin	
12	Aynesworth-Wright House	Aynesworth-Wright House	September 27, 1980 (#80004156)	10621 Pioneer Farms Dr in Jourdan-Bachman Pioneer Farms; 30°22′06″N 97°39′32″W	Austin	Greek Revival house built about 1852. Moved from original location.
13	Bailetti House	Bailetti House	September 17, 1985 (#85002268)	1006 Waller St. 30°16′09″N 97°43′46″W	Austin	
14	Baker School	Baker School	October 27, 2023 (#100009490)	3908 Ave. B 30°18′14″N 97°44′06″W	Austin	Now the Baker Center.
15	Charles W. Barnes House	Charles W. Barnes House	September 17, 1985 (#85002266)	1105 E. 12th St. 30°16′20″N 97°43′42″W	Austin	
16	William Braxton Barr House	William Braxton Barr House	January 10, 1983 (#83003164)	NE of Austin at 10463 Sprinkle Rd. 30°21′06″N 97°38′50″W	Austin	
17	Barton Springs Archeological and Historical District	Barton Springs Archeological and Historical District	November 27, 1985 (#85003213)	Address Restricted; 30°18′27″N 97°43′49″W	Austin	
18	Battle Hall	Battle Hall	August 25, 1970 (#70000763)	South Mall, University of Texas campus 30°17′07″N 97°44′25″W	Austin	
19	Judge Robert Lynn Batts House	Judge Robert Lynn Batts House	August 22, 1984 (#84002002)	1505 Windsor Rd. 30°16′49″N 97°45′11″W	Austin	
20	Bertram Building	Bertram Building	August 28, 2012 (#12000590)	1601 Guadalupe Street; 30°16′44″N 97°44′33″W	Austin	
21	Bluebonnet Tourist Camp	Bluebonnet Tourist Camp	August 16, 1990 (#90001188)	4407 Guadalupe St. 30°18′37″N 97°43′59″W	Austin	
22	Boardman-Webb-Bugg House	Boardman-Webb-Bugg House	January 8, 1980 (#80004152)	602 W. 9th St. 30°16′22″N 97°44′52″W	Austin	
23	Bremond Block Historic District	Bremond Block Historic District	April 3, 1970 (#70000764)	Roughly bounded by Guadalupe, San Antonio, 7th and 8th Sts. 30°16′14″N 97°44′47″W	Austin	
24	Genaro P. and Carolina Briones House	Genaro P. and Carolina Briones House	August 7, 1998 (#98000280)	1204 E. 7th St. 30°15′56″N 97°43′47″W	Austin	
25	Brizendine House	Brizendine House	July 22, 1974 (#74002090)	507 W. 11th St. 30°16′27″N 97°44′47″W	Austin	
26	Brown Building	Brown Building	April 24, 1997 (#97000364)	708 Colorado St. 30°16′12″N 97°44′46″W	Austin	
27	Cambridge Tower	Cambridge Tower	June 20, 2018 (#100002603)	1801 Lavaca Street; 30°16′51″N 97°44′26″W	Austin	
28	Camp Mabry Historic District	Camp Mabry Historic District	August 30, 1996 (#96000967)	2210 W. 35th St. 30°18′56″N 97°45′38″W	Austin	
29	Carrington-Covert House	Carrington-Covert House	August 25, 1970 (#70000765)	1511 Colorado St. 30°16′40″N 97°44′24″W	Austin	
30	George Washington Carver Library	George Washington Carver Library	March 30, 2005 (#05000241)	1165 Angelina St. 30°16′18″N 97°43′28″W	Austin	
31	Daniel H. and William T. Caswell Houses	Daniel H. and William T. Caswell Houses	April 21, 1975 (#75002004)	1404 and 1502 West Ave. 30°16′45″N 97°44′51″W	Austin	
32	Central Christian Church	Central Christian Church	July 16, 1992 (#92000889)	1110 Guadalupe St. 30°16′29″N 97°44′40″W	Austin	
33	Chapel for the Children	Chapel for the Children	May 9, 2022 (#100007709)	2203 West 35th St. 30°18′24″N 97°45′36″W	Austin	
34	Chapman House	Chapman House	September 9, 2010 (#10000739)	901 E 12th St. 30°16′19″N 97°43′50″W	Austin	
35	City Cemetery	City Cemetery	September 17, 1985 (#85002297)	16th and Navasota; 30°16′36″N 97°43′34″W	Austin	
36	Clarksville Historic District	Clarksville Historic District	December 1, 1976 (#76002070)	Bounded by W. Lynn, Waterson, W. 10th and MO-PAC Expwy. 30°16′51″N 97°45′44″W	Austin	
37	Clement's Market-The Sport Bar	Clement's Market-The Sport Bar	June 21, 2022 (#100007848)	1200 East 6th St. 30°15′52″N 97°43′49″W	Austin	
38	Commercial Building at 4113 Guadalupe Street	Commercial Building at 4113 Guadalupe Street	August 16, 1990 (#90001187)	4113 Guadalupe St. 30°18′24″N 97°44′07″W	Austin	
39	Community Center	Community Center	September 17, 1985 (#85002267)	1192 Angelina St. 30°16′19″N 97°43′31″W	Austin	
40	Congress Avenue Historic District	Congress Avenue Historic District	August 11, 1978 (#78002989)	Congress Ave. from Cesar Chavez to 11th St. 30°16′04″N 97°44′33″W	Austin	
41	Connelly-Yerwood House	Connelly-Yerwood House	April 18, 2003 (#03000279)	1115 E 12th St. 30°16′19″N 97°43′41″W	Austin	
42	Frank M. and Annie G. Covert House	Frank M. and Annie G. Covert House	August 16, 1990 (#90001185)	3912 Ave. G 30°18′07″N 97°43′48″W	Austin	
43	Covert Park at Mount Bonnell	Covert Park at Mount Bonnell	September 17, 2015 (#15000619)	3800 Mount Bonnell Rd. 30°19′16″N 97°46′25″W	Austin	
44	Andrew M. Cox Ranch Site		December 6, 1975 (#75002009)	Barton Creek near Loop 360 and MoPac; 30°14′35″N 97°48′21″W	Austin	
45	Cox Springs School		March 9, 2026 (#100012796)	18725 Old Burnet Road; 30°27′18″N 97°57′06″W	Jonestown	
46	Cox-Craddock House	Cox-Craddock House	May 30, 2001 (#01000612)	720 E. 32nd St. 30°17′32″N 97°43′46″W	Austin	
47	Thomas Cranfill House	Thomas Cranfill House	December 29, 2004 (#04001416)	1901 Cliff St. 30°17′05″N 97°45′05″W	Austin	
48	Cranfill Apartments		August 20, 2013 (#13000613)	1909 Cliff St., Building B 30°17′07″N 97°45′05″W	Austin	
49	Deep Eddy Bathing Beach	Deep Eddy Bathing Beach	June 23, 2003 (#03000560)	301 Quarry St. 30°16′36″N 97°46′22″W	Austin	
50	Delta Kappa Gamma Society International Headquarters Building	Delta Kappa Gamma Society International Headquarters Building	April 10, 2012 (#12000198)	416 West 12th Street; 30°16′31″N 97°44′41″W	Austin	
51	Delwood Duplex Historic District	Delwood Duplex Historic District	March 21, 2011 (#11000132)	Roughly bounded between Maplewood Ave. and Kirkwood, Ashwood, and Wrightwood Rds. 30°17′40″N 97°42′52″W	Austin	Historic Residential Suburbs in the United States, 1830-1960 MPS
52	J. Frank Dobie House	J. Frank Dobie House	May 20, 1991 (#91000575)	702 E. 26th St. 30°17′21″N 97°43′56″W	Austin	
53	Driskill Hotel	Driskill Hotel	November 25, 1969 (#69000212)	117 E. 7th St. 30°16′05″N 97°44′29″W	Austin	
54	East Main Street Historic District	East Main Street Historic District	September 10, 2012 (#12000788)	111, 113, 115, and 117 E. Main St. 30°26′25″N 97°37′11″W	Pflugerville	
55	Evans Industrial Building	Evans Industrial Building	June 17, 1982 (#82004525)	Huston-Tillotson College Campus, 1820 E 8th 30°15′48″N 97°42′41″W	Austin	
56	Federal Office Building	Federal Office Building	April 27, 2011 (#11000211)	300 E. 8th Ave. 30°16′10″N 97°44′20″W	Austin	
57	Fiesta Gardens	Fiesta Gardens	April 5, 2019 (#100003600)	2101 Jesse E. Segovia St. 30°14′56″N 97°43′33″W	Austin	
58	Fischer House	Fischer House	December 16, 1982 (#82001741)	1008 West Ave. 30°16′28″N 97°44′56″W	Austin	
59	Seymour and Barbara Fogel House	Seymour and Barbara Fogel House	April 2, 2003 (#03000186)	2411 Kinney Rd. 30°14′39″N 97°46′27″W	Austin	
60	French Legation	French Legation	November 25, 1969 (#69000213)	802 San Marcos St. 30°16′01″N 97°43′56″W	Austin	
61	German American Ladies College	German American Ladies College	August 13, 2013 (#13000601)	1604 E. 11th St. 30°16′03″N 97°43′26″W	Austin	
62	Gethsemane Lutheran Church	Gethsemane Lutheran Church	December 30, 2011 (#11000983)	200 W. Anderson Ln. 30°20′44″N 97°42′20″W	Austin	
63	Gethsemane Lutheran Church and Luther Hall	Gethsemane Lutheran Church and Luther Hall	August 25, 1970 (#70000766)	1510 Congress Ave. 30°16′40″N 97°44′22″W	Austin	
64	Gilfillan House	Gilfillan House	September 27, 1980 (#80004153)	603 W. 8th St. 30°16′17″N 97°44′53″W	Austin	
65	Goodman Building	Goodman Building	April 13, 1973 (#73001976)	202 W. 13th St. 30°16′28″N 97°44′33″W	Austin	
66	Governor's Mansion	Governor's Mansion	August 25, 1970 (#70000896)	1010 Colorado St. 30°16′22″N 97°44′34″W	Austin	
67	Granger House and The Perch	Granger House and The Perch	November 29, 2006 (#06001083)	805 W. 16th St. 30°16′48″N 97°44′52″W	Austin	
68	Green Pastures	Green Pastures	September 27, 1980 (#80004154)	811 W. Live Oak St. 30°14′42″N 97°45′45″W	Austin	
69	Haehnel Building	Haehnel Building	September 17, 1985 (#85002295)	1101 E. 11th St. 30°16′08″N 97°43′45″W	Austin	
70	Hancock Golf Course	Hancock Golf Course	September 30, 2014 (#14000821)	811 E. 41st Street; 30°17′56″N 97°43′29″W	Austin	
71	John Hancock House	John Hancock House	April 13, 1973 (#73001977)	1306 Colorado St. 30°16′33″N 97°44′31″W	Austin	
72	Haynes-DeLashwah House	Haynes-DeLashwah House	March 3, 1983 (#83004033)	1209 Rosewood Ave. 30°16′06″N 97°43′35″W	Austin	
73	Hildreth-Flanagan-Heierman House	Hildreth-Flanagan-Heierman House	August 16, 1990 (#90001184)	3909 Ave. G 30°18′04″N 97°43′47″W	Austin	
74	Henry Hirshfeld House and Cottage	Henry Hirshfeld House and Cottage	April 13, 1973 (#73001978)	303 and 305 W. 9th St. 30°16′17″N 97°44′40″W	Austin	
75	Hofheintz-Reissig Store	Hofheintz-Reissig Store	June 23, 1983 (#83003165)	600 E. 3rd St. 30°15′49″N 97°44′15″W	Austin	
76	Goldie Horton-Porter House	Goldie Horton-Porter House	October 4, 1990 (#90001535)	2402 Windsor Rd. 30°17′22″N 97°45′22″W	Austin	
77	House at 1170 San Bernard Street	House at 1170 San Bernard Street	September 17, 1985 (#85002269)	1170 San Bernard St. 30°16′12″N 97°43′33″W	Austin	
78	House at 1400 Canterbury Street	House at 1400 Canterbury Street	September 17, 1985 (#85002274)	1400 Canterbury St. 30°15′27″N 97°43′50″W	Austin	
79	Huston-Tillotson College	Huston-Tillotson College	April 22, 2022 (#100007662)	900 Chicon St. 30°15′52″N 97°43′19″W	Austin	
80	Hyde Park Historic District	Hyde Park Historic District	August 16, 1990 (#90001191)	Roughly bounded by Ave. A, 45th St., Duval St., and 40th St. 30°18′27″N 97°43′49″W	Austin	
81	Hyde Park Presbyterian Church	Hyde Park Presbyterian Church	August 16, 1990 (#90001175)	3915 Ave. B 30°18′14″N 97°44′04″W	Austin	
82	Robert Irvin House	Robert Irvin House	September 17, 1985 (#85002270)	1008 E. 9th St. 30°16′04″N 97°43′50″W	Austin	
83	A. J. Jernigan House	A. J. Jernigan House	September 22, 1983 (#83003166)	602 Harthan; 30°16′25″N 97°45′28″W	Austin	
84	Phillip W. Jobe House	Phillip W. Jobe House	September 17, 1985 (#85002278)	1113 E. 9th St. 30°16′00″N 97°43′43″W	Austin	
85	C.E. Johnson House	C.E. Johnson House	September 17, 1985 (#85002282)	1022 E. 7th St. 30°15′57″N 97°43′50″W	Austin	
86	Kappa Kappa Gamma House	Kappa Kappa Gamma House	August 13, 2013 (#13000602)	2001 University Ave. 30°16′58″N 97°44′22″W	Austin	
87	Keith House	Keith House	May 8, 1998 (#98000448)	2400 Harris Blvd. 30°17′27″N 97°45′24″W	Austin	
88	Laguna Gloria	Laguna Gloria	December 6, 1975 (#75002005)	3809 W. 35th St. 30°18′40″N 97°46′25″W	Austin	
89	Lamar Boulevard Bridge	Lamar Boulevard Bridge	July 7, 1994 (#94000678)	Lamar Blvd. over the Colorado R. 30°15′55″N 97°45′22″W	Austin	
90	Charles P. Ledbetter House	Charles P. Ledbetter House	August 16, 1990 (#90001178)	3904 Ave. C 30°18′11″N 97°44′03″W	Austin	
91	Levi Rock Shelter		June 21, 1971 (#71000965)	Near Hwy 71 and the Pedernales River on Lick Creek; 30°22′53″N 98°05′17″W	Austin	
92	Lexington Apartments and Motor Inns	Lexington Apartments and Motor Inns	December 18, 2025 (#100012467)	3300 Manor Road; 30°17′14″N 97°42′09″W	Austin	
93	Limerick-Frazier House	Limerick-Frazier House	March 30, 2005 (#05000238)	810 E. 13th St. 30°16′24″N 97°43′51″W	Austin	
94	Lions Municipal Golf Course	Lions Municipal Golf Course	July 7, 2016 (#16000354)	2901 Enfield Rd. 30°17′23″N 97°46′43″W	Austin	
95	Little Campus	Little Campus	August 13, 1974 (#74002091)	Bounded by 18th, Oldham, 19th, and Red River Sts. 30°16′42″N 97°43′53″W	Austin	
96	Littlefield House	Littlefield House	August 25, 1970 (#70000767)	24th St. and Whitis Ave. 30°17′17″N 97°44′27″W	Austin	
97	Long Hog Hollow Archeological District		May 25, 1984 (#84002003)	Address Restricted	Austin	
98	Lung House	Lung House	February 5, 2014 (#13001159)	1605 Canterbury St. 30°15′23″N 97°43′45″W	Austin	
99	John W. Maddox House	John W. Maddox House	September 17, 1985 (#85002293)	1115 E. 3rd St. 30°15′40″N 97°43′54″W	Austin	
100	Peter and Clotilde Shipe Mansbendel House	Peter and Clotilde Shipe Mansbendel House	August 16, 1990 (#90001183)	3824 Ave. F 30°18′04″N 97°43′55″W	Austin	
101	Mather-Kirkland House	Mather-Kirkland House	December 8, 1978 (#78002990)	402 Academy; 30°15′07″N 97°44′38″W	Austin	
102	Mayfield-Gutsch Estate	Mayfield-Gutsch Estate	September 29, 1994 (#94001159)	3505 W. 35th St. 30°18′46″N 97°46′14″W	Austin	
103	Arthur N. and Jane Y. McCallum House	Arthur N. and Jane Y. McCallum House	August 22, 1996 (#96000936)	613 W. 32nd St. 30°17′56″N 97°44′28″W	Austin	
104	Robert H. and Edith Ethel McCauley House	Robert H. and Edith Ethel McCauley House	August 16, 1990 (#90001236)	4415 Ave. A 30°18′36″N 97°43′55″W	Austin	
105	McFarland House	McFarland House	August 17, 2020 (#100005460)	3805 Red River St. 30°17′47″N 97°43′24″W	Austin	
106	Floyd McGown House	Floyd McGown House	September 17, 1985 (#85002290)	1202 Garden St. 30°15′27″N 97°43′58″W	Austin	
107	McKinney Homestead	McKinney Homestead	October 16, 1974 (#74002093)	SW of Austin between TX 71 and U.S. 183; 30°11′23″N 97°43′15″W	Austin	
108	Fannie Moss Miller House	Fannie Moss Miller House	April 16, 2008 (#08000318)	900 Rio Grande St., 30°16′23″N 97°44′55″W	Austin	
109	Millett Opera House	Millett Opera House	March 21, 1978 (#78002991)	110 E. 9th St. 30°16′15″N 97°44′27″W	Austin	
110	Missouri, Kansas and Texas Land Co. House	Missouri, Kansas and Texas Land Co. House	August 16, 1990 (#90001179)	3908 Ave. C 30°18′12″N 97°44′02″W	Austin	
111	Montopolis Bridge	Montopolis Bridge	October 10, 1996 (#96001118)	US 183, 8.1 mi (13.0 km). S of jct. with I-35; 30°14′43″N 97°41′29″W	Austin	
112	Montopolis Negro School		October 28, 2026 (#100013555)	500 Montopolis Dr. 30°14′25″N 97°41′37″W	Austin	
113	Moonlight Towers	Moonlight Towers	July 12, 1976 (#76002071)	Austin and vicinity 30°16′17″N 97°44′41″W	Austin	
114	Moore's Crossing Historic District	Moore's Crossing Historic District	October 16, 1996 (#96001091)	Roughly bounded by FM 973, old Burleson Rd. and Onion Cr. 30°10′03″N 97°39′43″W	Austin	
115	Moore-Hancock Farmstead	Moore-Hancock Farmstead	September 2, 1994 (#94001079)	4811 Sinclair Ave. 30°19′15″N 97°44′30″W	Austin	
116	Charles B. Moreland House	Charles B. Moreland House	September 17, 1985 (#85002276)	1301 E. Cesar Chavez; 30°15′34″N 97°43′54″W	Austin	
117	Chester and Lorine Nagel House	Chester and Lorine Nagel House	April 17, 1997 (#97000361)	3215 Churchill Dr. 30°18′15″N 97°45′03″W	Austin	
118	Neill-Cochran House	Neill-Cochran House	August 25, 1970 (#70000768)	2310 San Gabriel St. 30°17′15″N 97°44′53″W	Austin	
119	Newton House	Newton House	April 2, 1987 (#87000578)	1013 E. Ninth St. 30°16′02″N 97°43′48″W	Austin	
120	Elisabet Ney Studio and Museum	Elisabet Ney Studio and Museum	November 29, 1972 (#72001374)	304 E. 44th St. 30°18′23″N 97°43′34″W	Austin	
121	Norwood Building	Norwood Building	February 7, 2011 (#10001224)	114 W 7th St. 30°16′10″N 97°44′35″W	Austin	
122	Oakwood Cemetery Annex	Oakwood Cemetery Annex	October 30, 2003 (#03001103)	1601 Comal St. 30°16′36″N 97°43′25″W	Austin	
123	Old Bakery	Old Bakery	December 17, 1969 (#69000214)	1006 Congress Ave. 30°16′20″N 97°44′30″W	Austin	
124	Old Land Office Building	Old Land Office Building	August 25, 1970 (#70000769)	108 E. 11th St. 30°16′21″N 97°44′22″W	Austin	
125	Old West Austin Historic District	Old West Austin Historic District	September 12, 2003 (#03000937)	Roughly bounded by W. 13th, Lamar Boulevard, W. 35th, and the Mo-Pac Expressway; 30°17′32″N 97°45′18″W	Austin	
126	Oliphant-Walker House	Oliphant-Walker House	August 16, 1990 (#90001177)	3900 Ave. C 30°18′10″N 97°44′04″W	Austin	
127	Onion Creek Crossing at McKinney Falls	Onion Creek Crossing at McKinney Falls	May 30, 2019 (#100003972)	McKinney Falls State Park, 5808 McKinney Falls Pkwy; 30°10′51″N 97°43′19″W	Austin	
128	Page-Gilbert House	Page-Gilbert House	August 16, 1990 (#90001186)	3913 Ave. G 30°18′06″N 97°43′47″W	Austin	
129	Michael Paggi House	Michael Paggi House	April 16, 1975 (#75002006)	200 Lee Barton Dr. 30°15′49″N 97°45′24″W	Austin	
130	Paramount Theatre	Paramount Theatre	June 23, 1976 (#76002072)	713 Congress Ave. 30°16′10″N 97°44′31″W	Austin	
131	James F. and Susie R. Parker House	James F. and Susie R. Parker House	August 16, 1990 (#90001181)	3906 Ave. D 30°18′10″N 97°43′59″W	Austin	
132	Parque Zaragoza	Parque Zaragoza	May 24, 2022 (#100007750)	2608 Gonzales St. 30°15′42″N 97°42′45″W	Austin	
133	Perry Estate-St. Mary's Academy	Perry Estate-St. Mary's Academy	August 8, 2001 (#01000874)	701 E. 41st St. 30°18′04″N 97°43′25″W	Austin	
134	Edgar H. Perry Jr. House	Edgar H. Perry Jr. House	July 11, 2014 (#14000404)	801 Park Boulevard; 30°18′07″N 97°43′23″W	Austin	
135	George A. Peterson House	George A. Peterson House	September 17, 1985 (#85002273)	1012 E. 8th St. 30°16′00″N 97°43′50″W	Austin	
136	Della Phillips House	Della Phillips House	June 4, 2025 (#100011928)	2310 E. Martin Luther King, Jr. Blvd. 30°16′50″N 97°42′59″W	Austin	
137	Joseph O. Polhemus House	Joseph O. Polhemus House	September 17, 1985 (#85002299)	912 E. 2nd St. 30°15′41″N 97°44′03″W	Austin	
138	William Sidney Porter House	William Sidney Porter House	June 18, 1973 (#73001979)	409 E. 5th S. 30°15′56″N 97°44′20″W	Austin	
139	Rainey Street Historic District	Rainey Street Historic District	September 17, 1985 (#85002302)	70-97 Rainey St. 30°15′33″N 97°44′18″W	Austin	
140	F. T. and Belle Ramsey House	F. T. and Belle Ramsey House	August 16, 1990 (#90001176)	4412 Ave. B 30°18′34″N 97°43′53″W	Austin	
141	Rather House	Rather House	October 24, 1979 (#79003013)	3105 Duval St. 30°17′34″N 97°43′56″W	Austin	
142	Raymond-Morley House	Raymond-Morley House	November 20, 1974 (#74002092)	510 Baylor St. 30°16′18″N 97°45′19″W	Austin	
143	Louis and Mathilde Reuter House	Louis and Mathilde Reuter House	December 7, 1987 (#87002100)	806 Rosedale Terrace; 30°14′28″N 97°44′41″W	Austin	
144	Alice H. Robbins House	Alice H. Robbins House	August 16, 1990 (#90001235)	4311 Ave. A 30°18′32″N 97°43′58″W	Austin	
145	Roberts Clinic	Roberts Clinic	September 12, 2019 (#100004375)	1174 San Bernard St. 30°16′15″N 97°43′35″W	Austin	
146	Robinson-Macken House	Robinson-Macken House	September 12, 1985 (#85002300)	702 Rio Grande St. 30°16′17″N 97°44′57″W	Austin	
147	Edward H. Rogers Homestead	Edward H. Rogers Homestead	December 27, 1974 (#74002094)	N of Austin off TX 1325; 30°23′53″N 97°43′44″W	Austin	
148	Rogers-Bell House	Rogers-Bell House	June 24, 1988 (#88000703)	1001 E. Eighth St. 30°16′00″N 97°43′53″W	Austin	
149	Rosewood Courts Historic District	Rosewood Courts Historic District	October 4, 2016 (#14000549)	Roughly bounded by Rosewood Ave., Chicon & Poquito Sts. 30°16′13″N 97°43′07″W	Austin	
150	Rosewood Elementary School		October 15, 2026 (#100013533)	2406 Rosewood Avenue; 30°16′20″N 97°42′32″W	Austin	
151	Roy-Hardin House		August 17, 2005 (#05000893)	1803 Evergreen Ave. 30°14′58″N 97°45′53″W	Austin	
152	Royal Arch Masonic Lodge	Royal Arch Masonic Lodge	April 28, 2005 (#05000362)	311 W. 7th St. 30°16′11″N 97°44′43″W	Austin	
153	St. Martin's Evangelical Lutheran Church	St. Martin's Evangelical Lutheran Church	September 15, 2023 (#100009392)	606 West 15th St. 30°16′44″N 97°44′45″W	Austin	
154	George W. Sampson House	George W. Sampson House	July 8, 1982 (#82004526)	1003 Rio Grande; 30°16′25″N 97°44′52″W	Austin	
155	Santa Rita Courts	Santa Rita Courts	April 17, 2008 (#08000319)	Roughly bounded by E. 2nd, Pedernales, Santa Rita, and Corta Sts. 30°15′22″N 97°43′01″W	Austin	
156	Kurt and Meta Schemedes House	Kurt and Meta Schemedes House	June 15, 2000 (#00000696)	804 Baylor St. 30°16′26″N 97°45′15″W	Austin	
157	J. P. Schneider Store	J. P. Schneider Store	January 29, 1979 (#79003014)	401 W. 2nd St. 30°15′55″N 97°44′52″W	Austin	
158	Scholz Garten	Scholz Garten	July 27, 1979 (#79003015)	1607 San Jacinto; 30°16′40″N 97°44′11″W	Austin	
159	Walter Schulze House and Industrial Structure		April 25, 1986 (#86000864)	102 Chicon St. 30°15′59″N 97°43′27″W	Austin	Moved or demolished
160	Zachary T. Sr., and Sallie Lee Scott House		September 7, 1998 (#98001087)	2408 Sweetbrush Dr. 30°18′02″N 97°46′38″W	Austin	
161	Scottish Rite Dormitory	Scottish Rite Dormitory	April 23, 1998 (#98000404)	210 W. 27th St. 30°17′32″N 97°44′21″W	Austin	
162	Seaholm Power Plant	Seaholm Power Plant	August 20, 2013 (#13000614)	800 W. Cesar Chavez St. 30°15′59″N 97°45′10″W	Austin	
163	Rev. Henry M. and Jennie Sears House	Rev. Henry M. and Jennie Sears House	August 16, 1990 (#90001174)	209 W. 39th St. 30°18′09″N 97°44′04″W	Austin	
164	Shadow Lawn Historic District	Shadow Lawn Historic District	August 16, 1990 (#90001192)	Roughly bounded by Ave. G, 38th St., Duval St., and 39th St. 30°17′59″N 97°43′48″W	Austin	
165	Sheeks-Robertson House	Sheeks-Robertson House	June 24, 1976 (#76002073)	610 W. Lynn St. 30°16′34″N 97°45′43″W	Austin	
166	Shield Ranch		February 24, 2020 (#100004984)	Address Restricted	Bee Cave vicinity	A boundary increase was approved February 17, 2026.
167	Col. Monroe M. Shipe House	Col. Monroe M. Shipe House	March 29, 1983 (#83003167)	3816 Ave. G 30°18′03″N 97°43′52″W	Austin	
168	Shotgun at 1206 Canterbury Street		September 17, 1985 (#85002285)	1206 Canterbury St. 30°15′29″N 97°43′18″W	Austin	Moved or demolished
169	Shotguns at 1203-1205 Bob Harrison	Shotguns at 1203-1205 Bob Harrison	September 17, 1985 (#85002284)	1203-1205 Bob Harrison; 30°16′25″N 97°43′37″W	Austin	
170	Simms House	Simms House	March 30, 2005 (#05000242)	906 Mariposa Dr. 30°14′28″N 97°44′37″W	Austin	
171	Simpson Memorial Methodist Church	Simpson Memorial Methodist Church	August 24, 2015 (#15000544)	1701 E. 12th St. 30°16′23″N 97°43′18″W	Austin	
172	Sixth Street Historic District	Sixth Street Historic District	December 30, 1975 (#75002132)	Roughly bounded by 5th, 7th, Lavaca Sts. and I-35; 30°16′02″N 97°44′23″W	Austin	
173	Smith Rock Shelter	Smith Rock Shelter	October 1, 1974 (#74002095)	In McKinney Falls State Park; 30°11′03″N 97°43′26″W	Austin	
174	Smith-Marcuse-Lowry House	Smith-Marcuse-Lowry House	August 16, 1990 (#90001180)	3913 Ave. C 30°18′12″N 97°44′00″W	Austin	
175	Smith-Clark and Smith-Bickler Houses	Smith-Clark and Smith-Bickler Houses	April 20, 1979 (#79003016)	502 and 504 W. 14th St. 30°16′39″N 97°44′41″W	Austin	
176	Richmond Kelley Smoot House	Richmond Kelley Smoot House	August 12, 1982 (#82004527)	1316 W. 6th St. 30°16′28″N 97°45′35″W	Austin	
177	Southgate-Lewis House	Southgate-Lewis House	September 17, 1985 (#85002265)	1501 E. 12th St. 30°16′23″N 97°43′25″W	Austin	
178	Southwestern Telegraph and Telephone Building	Southwestern Telegraph and Telephone Building	February 14, 1978 (#78002993)	410 Congress Ave. 30°16′00″N 97°44′37″W	Austin	
179	St. David's Episcopal Church	St. David's Episcopal Church	August 2, 1978 (#78002994)	304 E. 7th St. 30°16′06″N 97°44′21″W	Austin	
180	St. Edward's University Main Building and Holy Cross Dormitory	St. Edward's University Main Building and Holy Cross Dormitory	March 7, 1973 (#73001980)	3001 S. Congress St. 30°13′46″N 97°45′17″W	Austin	
181	St. Mary's Cathedral	St. Mary's Cathedral	April 2, 1973 (#73001981)	201-207 10th St. 30°16′15″N 97°44′23″W	Austin	
182	State Cemetery of Texas	State Cemetery of Texas	May 12, 1986 (#86001085)	901 Navasota St. 30°15′54″N 97°43′34″W	Austin	
183	State Lunatic Asylum	State Lunatic Asylum	December 4, 1987 (#87002115)	4110 Guadalupe; 30°18′27″N 97°44′12″W	Austin	
184	Stavely-Kunz-Johnson House	Stavely-Kunz-Johnson House	August 19, 1980 (#80004155)	1402 E. Cesar Chavez; 30°15′30″N 97°43′47″W	Austin	
185	Suburban Alcoholic Foundation Clubhouse		February 17, 2023 (#100008622)	2809 Northland Dr. 30°20′01″N 97°45′00″W	Austin	
186	Swedish Hill Historic District	Swedish Hill Historic District	May 12, 1986 (#86001088)	900-1000 blocks of E. Fourteenth St. and 900 block of E. Fifteenth St. 30°16′28″N 97°43′45″W	Austin	
187	Teachers State Association of Texas Building	Teachers State Association of Texas Building	April 28, 2005 (#05000361)	1191 Navasota; 30°16′18″N 97°43′39″W	Austin	
188	Texas Federation of Women's Clubs Headquarters	Texas Federation of Women's Clubs Headquarters	October 24, 1985 (#85003377)	2312 San Gabriel St. 30°17′16″N 97°44′53″W	Austin	
189	Texas State Capitol	Texas State Capitol	June 22, 1970 (#70000770)	Congress and 11th Sts. 30°16′28″N 97°44′22″W	Austin	
190	Third Street Railroad Trestle	Third Street Railroad Trestle	November 23, 2021 (#100007202)	West end of 3rd St. at Shoal Cr. 30°16′02″N 97°45′01″W	Austin	
191	Town Lake Gazebo	Town Lake Gazebo	February 7, 2020 (#100004970)	9307 Ann & Roy Butler Hike & Bike Trail; 30°15′45″N 97°44′55″W	Austin	
192	Travis Heights-Fairview Park Historic District	Travis Heights-Fairview Park Historic District	July 30, 2021 (#100006796)	Roughly bounded by Edgecliff Terr., South Congress Ave., East Live Oak St., and Kenwood Ave. 30°14′45″N 97°44′28″W	Austin	
193	Tucker Apartment House	Tucker Apartment House	July 24, 2017 (#100001379)	1105 Nueces St. 30°16′29″N 97°44′47″W	Austin	
194	Charles Umlauf House and Studio		June 6, 2024 (#100010381)	506 Barton Boulevard; 30°15′51″N 97°45′54″W	Austin	
195	U.S. Post Office and Federal Building	U.S. Post Office and Federal Building	August 25, 1970 (#70000771)	126 W. 6th St. 30°16′07″N 97°44′36″W	Austin	
196	University Baptist Church	University Baptist Church	July 31, 1998 (#98000955)	2130 Guadalupe St. 30°17′05″N 97°44′31″W	Austin	
197	University Junior High School	University Junior High School	April 19, 2001 (#01000396)	1925 San Jacinto Blvd. 30°16′51″N 97°43′58″W	Austin	
198	Victory Grill	Victory Grill	October 16, 1998 (#98001226)	1104 E. 11th St. 30°16′09″N 97°43′43″W	Austin	
199	Wahrenberger House	Wahrenberger House	February 23, 1978 (#78002995)	208 W. 14th St. 30°16′36″N 97°44′30″W	Austin	
200	Walnut Creek Archeological District		September 24, 1981 (#81000633)	Address Restricted	Austin	
201	James M. and Leana B. Walsh House	James M. and Leana B. Walsh House	February 5, 2014 (#13001160)	3701 Bonnie Rd. 30°17′46″N 97°46′56″W	Austin	
202	Willie Wells House	Willie Wells House	June 3, 2021 (#100006621)	1705 Newton St. 30°14′50″N 97°45′11″W	Austin	
203	Wesley United Methodist Church	Wesley United Methodist Church	September 17, 1985 (#85002281)	1164 San Bernard St. 30°16′11″N 97°43′34″W	Austin	
204	West Downtown Austin Historic District	West Downtown Austin Historic District	March 5, 2024 (#100010021)	Roughly bounded by W. 15th Street (north), San Antonio/Nueces Streets (east), W. 7th Street (south), and West Avenue/Shoal Creek (west); 30°16′33″N 97°44′49″W	Austin	
205	West Fifth Street Bridge at Shoal Creek	West Fifth Street Bridge at Shoal Creek	December 3, 2019 (#100004750)	West Fifth Street at Shoal Creek; 30°16′11″N 97°45′08″W	Austin	
206	West Line Historic District	West Line Historic District	October 12, 2005 (#05001166)	Roughly bounded by Baylor St., W. Fifth and Sixth Sts., MoPac Expressway; 30°16′43″N 97°45′35″W	Austin	
207	West Sixth Street Bridge at Shoal Creek	West Sixth Street Bridge at Shoal Creek	August 18, 2014 (#14000499)	West Sixth Street at Shoal Creek; 30°16′14″N 97°45′04″W	Austin	
208	Westgate Tower	Westgate Tower	October 12, 2010 (#10000820)	1122 Colorado St. 30°16′27″N 97°44′34″W	Austin	
209	Westhill	Westhill	July 26, 1979 (#79003017)	1703 West Ave. 30°16′52″N 97°44′45″W	Austin	
210	W.T. and Clotilde V. Williams House	W.T. and Clotilde V. Williams House	August 16, 1990 (#90001182)	3820 Ave. F 30°18′03″N 97°43′56″W	Austin	
211	Willow-Spence Streets Historic District	Willow-Spence Streets Historic District	September 17, 1985 (#85002264)	Portions of Willow, Spence, Canterbury, San Marcos, and Waller Sts. 30°15′32″N 97°44′03″W	Austin	
212	Wilshire Historic District	Wilshire Historic District	June 8, 2011 (#11000347)	Bounded by the Southern Pacific Railroad, Ardenwood Rd., Wilshire Boulevard, and the Delwood III subdivision 30°17′51″N 97°42′50″W	Austin	
213	Woodlawn	Woodlawn	August 25, 1970 (#70000772)	6 Niles Rd. 30°17′13″N 97°45′29″W	Austin	
214	Wooldridge Park	Wooldridge Park	August 1, 1979 (#79003018)	Guadalupe St. 30°16′20″N 97°44′43″W	Austin	
215	Goodall Wooten House	Goodall Wooten House	April 3, 1975 (#75002008)	700 W. 19th St. 30°16′58″N 97°44′44″W	Austin	
216	Worrell-Ettlinger House	Worrell-Ettlinger House	October 12, 2004 (#04001152)	3110 Harris Park Ave. 30°17′38″N 97°43′52″W	Austin	
217	Wroe-Bustin House	Wroe-Bustin House	January 25, 1997 (#96001626)	506 Baylor St. 30°16′28″N 97°45′21″W	Austin	
218	Youth Council Site (41TV382)		April 24, 1979 (#79003450)	Address Restricted	Austin	
219	Zilker Park Historic District	Zilker Park Historic District	May 23, 1997 (#97000479)	2100 Barton Springs Rd. 30°15′49″N 97°46′36″W	Austin	
220	Ziller House	Ziller House	May 8, 1998 (#98000449)	1110 Blanco; 30°16′40″N 97°45′16″W	Austin	

== Former listings ==
	Name on the Register	Image	Date listed	Date removed	Location	City or town	Description
1	John Henry and Minnie Tate Brewer House		August 21, 1995 (#95001027)	September 18, 2013	1108 S. Chicon St. 30°16′01″N 97°43′13″W	Austin	
2	Dr. Beadie E. and Willie R. Conner House and Park		September 19, 1997 (#97001110)	September 12, 2019	3111 E. 13th St. 30°16′37″N 97°42′03″W	Austin	
3	Doyle House		April 13, 1973 (#73001975)	June 19, 1975	310 E. 14th St.(Original location. Now located at:); 30°16′15″N 97°44′07″W	Austin	Delisted due to relocation.
4	Hardeman House		February 23, 1972 (#72001375)	June 12, 1972	401 E. 16th St.(Original location. Now located at:); 30°16′18″N 97°44′06″W	Austin	Delisted due to relocation.
5	John C. Houghton House	John C. Houghton House	April 24, 1973 (#73002248)	September 17, 1973	307 W. 12th St.	Austin	Demolished in September 1973 for a parking garage.
6	B. J. Smith House		April 19, 1978 (#78002992)	May 27, 1999	700 W. 6th St.	Austin	Delisted due to significant alteration.

== See also ==
- List of National Historic Landmarks in Texas
- National Register of Historic Places listings in Texas
- Recorded Texas Historic Landmarks in Travis County
