= Bertram =

Bertram may refer to:

== Places ==
- Bertram, Western Australia, a suburb of Perth, Australia
- Bertram, Iowa, United States, a city
- Bertram, Texas, United States, a city
- Bertram Glacier, Palmer Land, Antarctica

== Other uses ==
- Bertram (name), a list of people and fictional characters with the given name or surname
- Bertram (play), an 1816 play by Irish writer Charles Maturin
- Operation Bertram, an Allied deception operation leading up to the Second Battle of El Alamein
- Bertram-class air-sea rescue boat, a Royal Australian Navy class of two vessels disposed of in 1988
- Bertram Building, a historic building in Austin, Texas
- Bertram Hall (Radcliffe College), a dormitory building
- Bertram Yacht, a subsidiary of the Ferretti Group

== See also ==
- Bertrams, a UK book wholesaler
- Bertrams, Gauteng, a suburb of Johannesburg, South Africa
- Bartram, a surname
- Bertrand (disambiguation)
