= Bertrand =

Bertrand may refer to:

== Places ==
- Bertrand, Missouri, US
- Bertrand, Nebraska, US
- Bertrand, New Brunswick, Canada
- Bertrand Township, Michigan, US
- Bertrand, Michigan
- Bertrand, Virginia, US
- Bertrand Creek, state of Washington
- Saint-Bertrand-de-Comminges, France
- Bertrand (1981–94 electoral district), in Quebec
- Bertrand (electoral district), a provincial electoral district in Quebec

== Other ==
- Bertrand (name)
- Bertrand (steamboat), an 1865 steamboat that sank in the Missouri River
- Bertrand Baudelaire, a fictional character in A Series of Unfortunate Events
- Bertrand competition, an economic model where firms compete on price
- Bertrand's theorem, a theorem in classical mechanics
- Bertrand's postulate, a theorem about the distribution of prime numbers
- Bertrand, Count of Toulouse (died 1112)
- Bertrand (film), a 1964 Australian television film
- Livraria Bertrand, world's oldest operating bookstore

== See also ==
- Bertrand Gille (disambiguation)
- Bertram (disambiguation)
