= Guy Bertrand =

Guy Bertrand may refer to:

- Guy Bertrand (actor), played in The Crimson Permanent Assurance, a Monty Python film episode
- Guy Bertrand (broadcaster) (born 1954), French Canadian linguist and radio/TV personality
- Guy Bertrand (chemist) (born 1952), professor at UC San Diego and carbene specialist
- Guy Bertrand (lawyer), Québec lawyer and political activist
- Guy Bertrand (musician) plays the music of Limousin
- Guy Bertrand (1881–1950), son of Edith Peers-Williams and George Spencer-Churchill, 8th Duke of Marlborough

== See also ==
- Bertrand (disambiguation)
- Guy (disambiguation)
