= Roberts Clinic =

- U.S. National Register of Historic Places
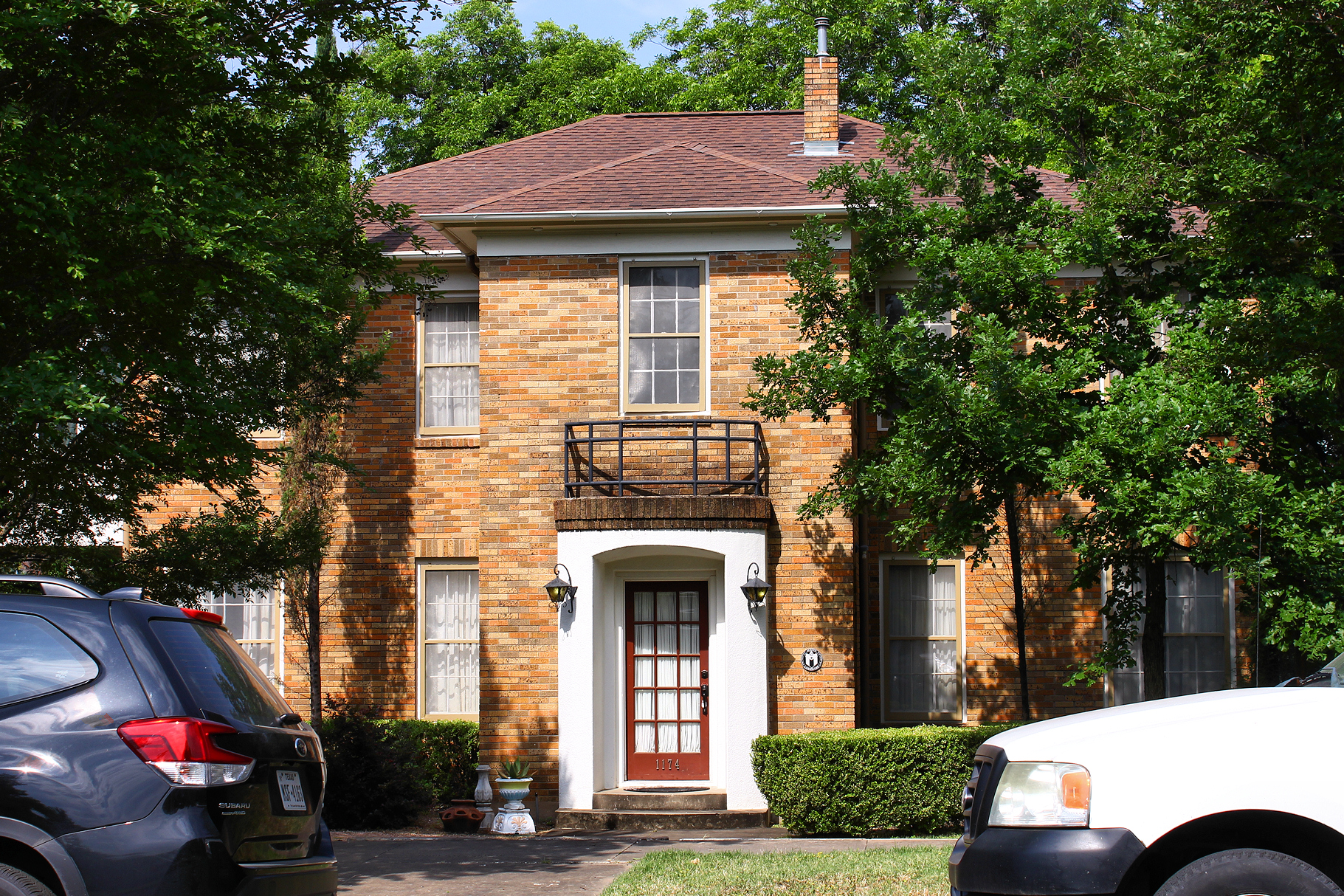
- Roberts Clinic

- Location within Texas Location within the United States
- Location: Austin, Texas, United States
- Coordinates: 30.270777°N 97.726383°W
- Built: 1937
- Architect: John R. Bingham
- Architectural style: Colonial Revival
- NRHP reference No.: 100004375
- Added to NRHP: September 12, 2019

Roberts Clinic, a historic Colonial Revival building completed in 1937, was the first medical facility in Austin, Texas established to provide hospital rooms and care exclusively for the comfort of American Black patients. The practice offered treatment for acute and chronic illnesses, preventive treatment, minor surgeries, labor, delivery, and abortion services through the 1960s.

== History ==
The hospital was conceived by Dr. Edward L. Roberts and constructed by architect John R. Bingham in response to the Koch and Fowler city plan, which in 1928 proposed a redlined district for marginalized minorities. Robertson Hill District allotted a community where the American Black population of Austin could access schools, and medical services. The clinic closed following the death of Dr. Edward L. Roberts in 1967; the hospital was later transformed into a halfway-house for recovering addicts.

Roberts Clinic, opened in 1937 by Dr. Edward L. Roberts, was the first medical facility in Austin with hospital rooms open exclusively for the treatment of American Black patients. In the Jim Crow era, racial discrimination and segregation affected the quality of medical care American Blacks received in public healthcare facilities while American Black physicians were professionally subordinated by white doctors. Proprietary clinics, like Roberts Clinic, that operated across the South from the 1930s-1950s provided American Black doctors professional autonomy to practice on patients who were treated without the humiliation of segregationist policies. As hospitals integrated in the 1950s and 1960s, these independent facilities closed.

Roberts, a Meharry Medical College graduate, opened Roberts Clinic in a Central East Austin residential neighborhood in 1937. The two-story Colonial Revival building had a medical facility on the first floor, and the Roberts Family lived on the second floor. Until 1967, Dr. Roberts administered treatment for preventative, acute, and chronic illnesses; performed minor surgeries; and offered labor and delivery services for the city's American Black community. Roberts Clinic is listed in the National Register of Historic Places under Criterion A for Ethnic Heritage: American Black and Health/Medicine as an excellent local example of small proprietary medical clinics built by American Black physicians during the period of segregated medical practices in the United States. It is the only remaining example of this property type extant in Austin, Texas.

== Architecture ==
Roberts Clinic was built approximately one mile from the Texas State Capitol.

=== Exterior ===
The 2-story brick structure has a projecting full-height centered gable, Georgian variants, and a white stucco portico that highlights the entrance. The secondary entrance is a glazed panel door with a mail slot.

=== Interior ===
Historically, the Roberts Clinic's first floor functioned as the medical clinic; patients entered through the east elevation to wait in the foyer. The rear wing, with exterior access only, is thought to have originally functioned as a laundry room.

== See also ==
- National Register of Historic Places listings in Travis County, Texas
