= Royal Arch Masonic Lodge =

- U.S. National Register of Historic Places
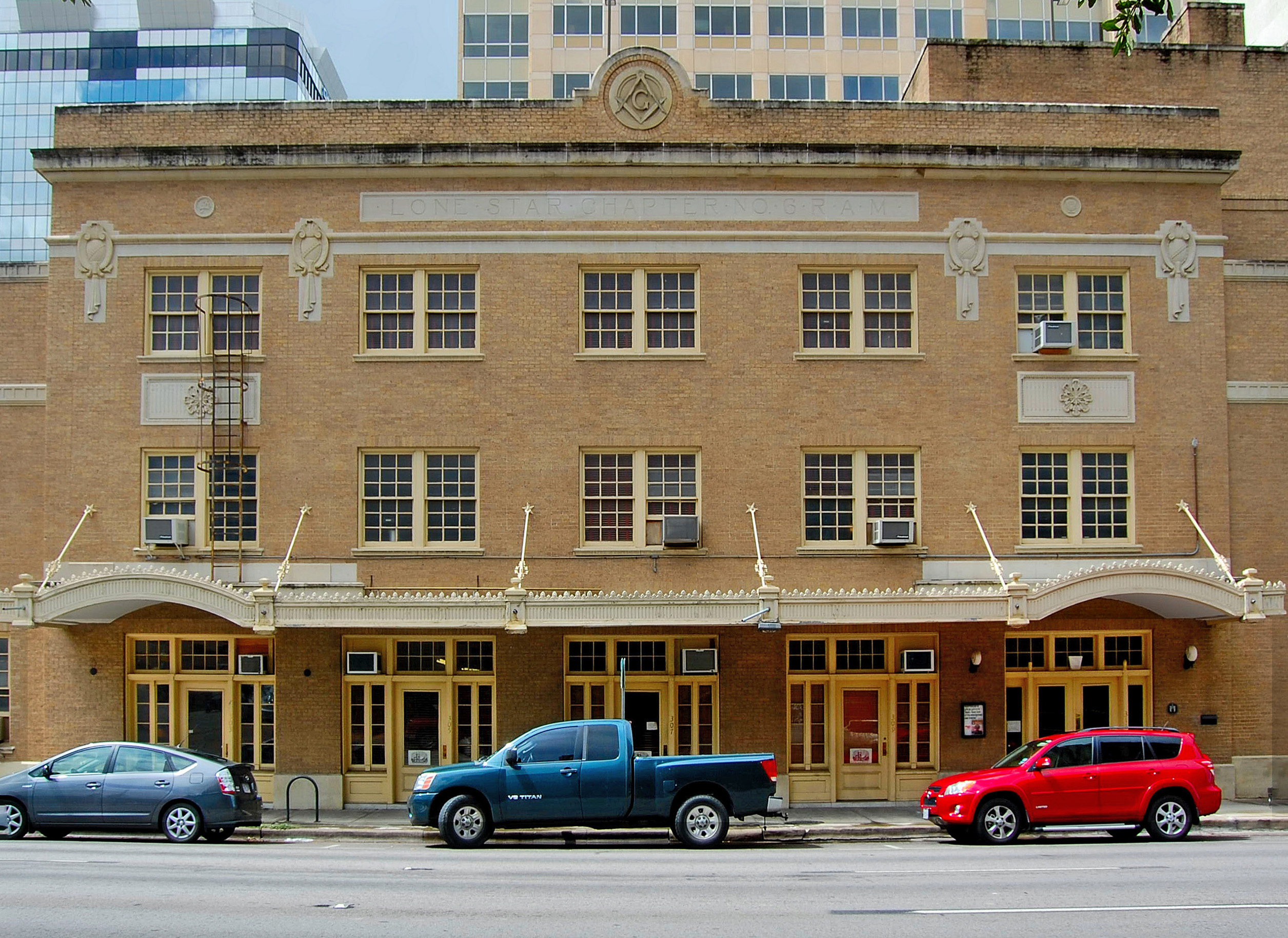

- Location within Texas Location within the United States
- Location: 311 W. 7th St., Austin, Texas
- Coordinates: 30°16′16″N 97°44′43″W
- Area: less than one acre
- Built: 1926
- Architect: Davies, J.B.; Ketchum, William E.
- Architectural style: Beaux Arts
- NRHP reference No.: 05000362
- Added to NRHP: April 28, 2005

The Royal Arch Masonic Lodge in Austin, Texas is a three-story beige brick Masonic building that was built in Beaux Arts style in 1926. It was designed by Texas architects J. B. Davies and William E. Ketchum. It was listed as a historic landmark by the city of Austin in 2000, and it was listed on the National Register of Historic Places in 2005.

It was still in use as a meeting place in 2005 and was deemed significant "for its long and continued use as a Masonic Lodge in Austin" and "for its architecture as a good representation of an early twentieth-century Beaux-Arts fraternal building."

The Historic Landmark Commission of Austin studied the proposition to build a tower building on top of the Royal Arch Masonic Lodge and approved a certificate of appropriateness for the project in November 2019. Both the interior and exterior of the original building will be renovated. The local Masons should get a 99-year lease on the building, and two floors reserved for their ceremonies. The project was criticized (‘desecration of an actual landmark’) for the height of the tower planned (40 stories including the original building) and the structural engineering risks linked to the complete excavation of the original building, but the new construction should unlock an annual $1.5 million in property tax revenue for the city of Austin, and should contribute to the revival of the area. Similar completed projects include the Hearst Tower in Manhattan.

== See also ==
- National Register of Historic Places listings in Travis County, Texas
