= St. David's Episcopal Church (Austin, Texas) =

Historic church in Texas, United States

- U.S. National Register of Historic Places
- Recorded Texas Historic Landmark
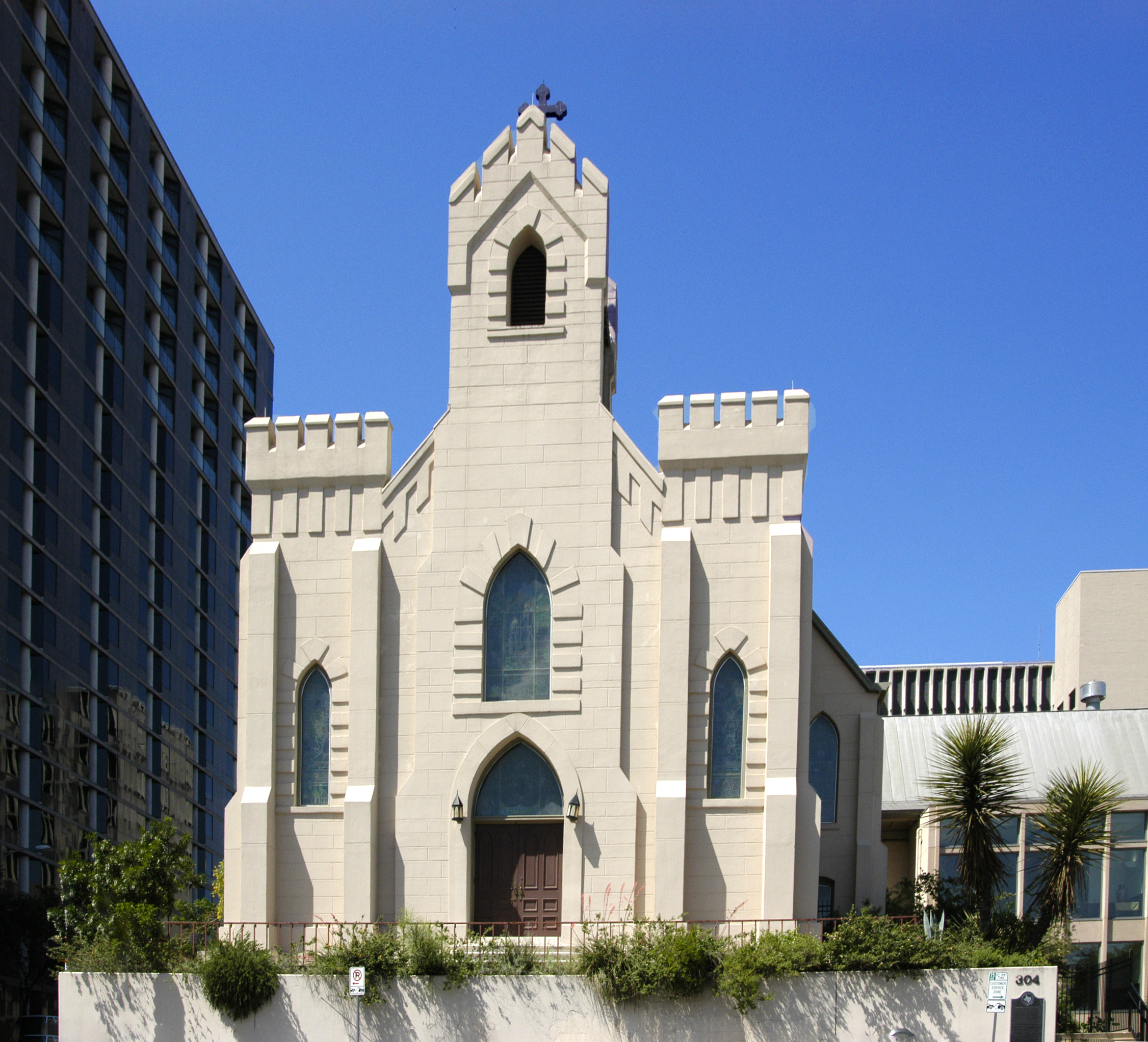
- Location: 304 E. 7th St; Austin, Texas, US
- Coordinates: 30°16′6″N 97°44′23″W
- Built: 1854
- Architect: Edward Fontaine
- Architectural style: Gothic
- NRHP reference No.: 78002994
- RTHL No.: 14196

Significant dates
- Added to NRHP: August 2, 1978
- Designated RTHL: 1966

St. David's Episcopal Church is a historic church in downtown Austin, Texas, United States. Its main church building was constructed in 1854–1855, making it one of the oldest standing buildings in the city. The first Episcopal church in Austin was briefly organized in 1848, nine years after Austin was founded. In 1851 the parish was reorganized, and work on the church building began two years later. The church is located at 304 E. 7th Street. It was added to the National Register of Historic Places in 1978.

== See also ==
- National Register of Historic Places listings in Travis County, Texas
- Recorded Texas Historic Landmarks in Travis County
