= Norwood Tower =

Historic structure in Austin, Texas

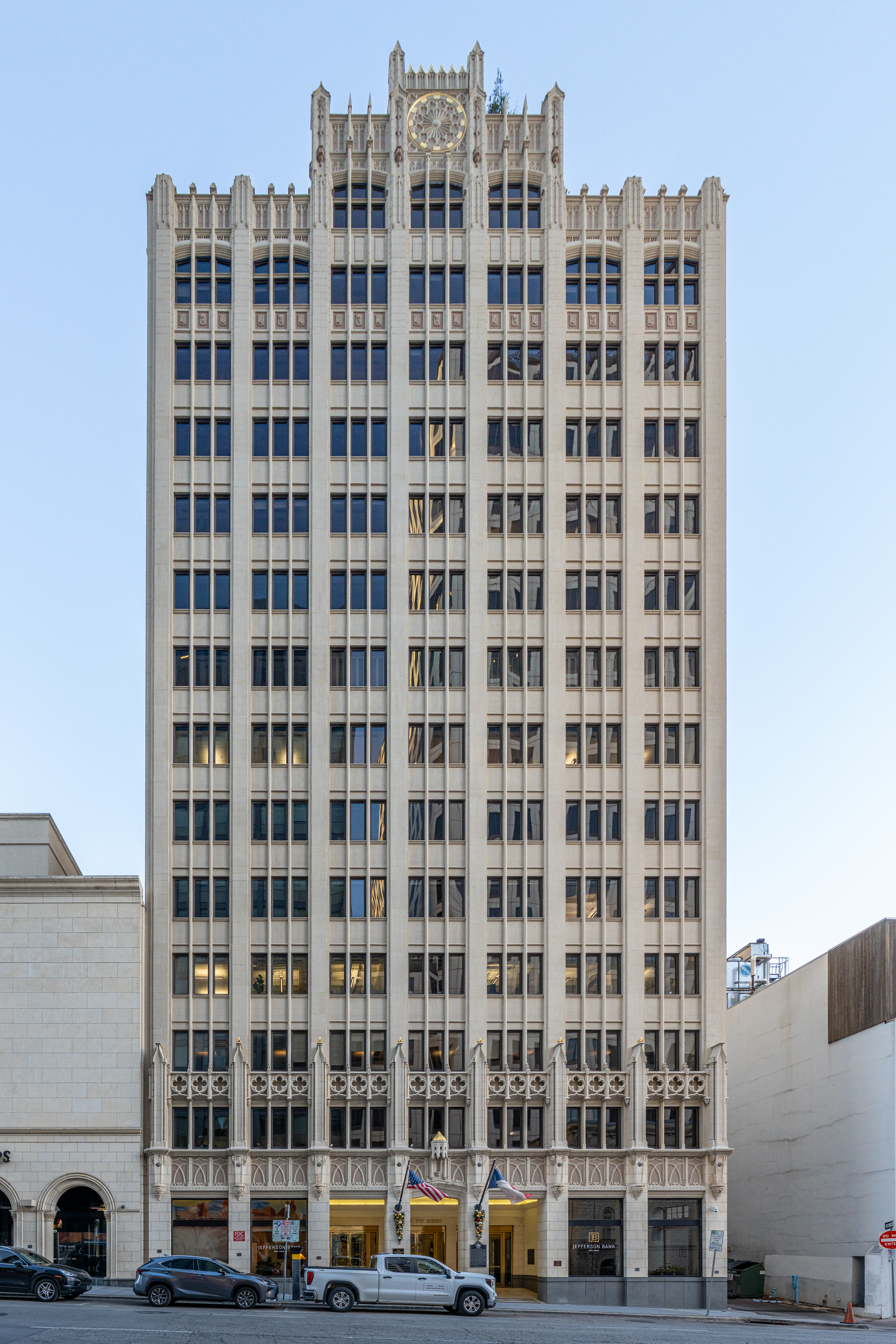
- Viewed from W 7th Street (2025)
- Interactive map of the Norwood Tower area
- Former names: Capital National Bank Building

General information
- Architectural style: Gothic Revival
- Location: 114 West 7th Street; Austin, Texas 78701
- Named for: Ollie Osborn Norwood
- Groundbreaking: 1928
- Opened: 1929
- Renovated: 1982–3
- Cost: $750,000
- Renovation cost: $5,000,000

Height
- Height: 189 feet (58 m)

Technical details
- Floor count: 16
- Floor area: 121,430 square feet (11,281 m^{2})
- Lifts/elevators: 3

Design and construction
- Architects: Bertram Giesecke, August Watkins "Watt" Harris
- Main contractor: Frank Barron

Renovating team
- Architects: Ford, Powell & Carson

Website
- norwoodtower.com
- Norwood Building
- U.S. National Register of Historic Places
- Recorded Texas Historic Landmark
- Location within Texas Location within the United States
- Coordinates: 30.2694°N 97.7432°W
- NRHP reference No.: 10001224
- RTHL No.: 13620

Significant dates
- Added to NRHP: February 7, 2011
- Designated RTHL: 2006

The Norwood Tower (previously known as the Capital National Bank Building) is a historic commercial building in downtown Austin, Texas. Built in 1929, the tower was named a Recorded Texas Historic Landmark in 2006 and added to the National Register of Historic Places in 2011. At the time of construction, it was the city's tallest commercial structure and Austin's first fully air-conditioned office building, and the adjoining parking structure was the city's first self-parking ramped auto garage. The tower remains Austin's only Gothic Revival high-rise building.

== History ==
In the early 1920s, Austin, Texas financier Ollie Osborn Norwood decided to build a large new office tower to provide professional space for the growing city. At the time, the only tall commercial buildings in Austin were the Scarbrough Building and the Littlefield Building; Norwood planned a cutting-edge professional complex, with central air conditioning in every office (an Austin first) and an integrated parking garage. In 1925 he acquired a downtown parcel, where he first built a parking structure which he called the "Motoramp Garage" at a cost of $250,000 (equivalent to $4,600,000 in 2025). The garage was the city's first ramped multi-story garage, which permitted self-parking by drivers.

When the garage was completed in January 1928, Norwood demolished a pre-existing residence on the lot and began building an office tower on the site, at a cost of $750,000 (equivalent to $14,100,000 in 2025). Construction was completed in the summer of 1929, after which the Norwood Building was occupied by medical, legal and financial offices, as well as retailers and government agencies. At the time, it was the city's tallest commercial building, and the third tallest structure, after the Texas State Capitol and the Stephen F. Austin Hotel.

=== Capital National Bank Building ===
Beginning in January 1934, Capital National Bank of Austin occupied the ground floor of the Norwood Building. In 1944 the bank purchased the building and renamed it the "Capital National Bank Building." The bank modified the adjoining garage in 1951 to allow ground-level commercial banking facilities to be extended into the garage building. Over the decades, CNB occupied progressively more and more of the building, until the bank eventually moved its headquarters to a larger building in 1981.

=== Norwood Tower ===
The building came under new ownership after CNB relocated in 1981. The new owners changed the building's name to the "Norwood Tower" and undertook major renovations between 1982 and 1983 at a cost of $5 million (equivalent to $16,700,000 in 2025). During this time the tower's exterior and lobby were repaired and restored, and the building was brought into compliance with modern building codes. The tower was named a Recorded Texas Historic Landmark in 2006, and on February 7, 2011 it was added to the National Register of Historic Places.

== Clarence Odie Williams ==
From the building's completion in 1929 until 1964, the Norwood Tower's maintenance engineer was Clarence Odie Williams, an African-American Austinite. Williams had a private office in the tower, with its own restroom, which he made available for public use. During the Segregation Era before the Civil Rights Act of 1964, Williams's office was the only public restroom in downtown Austin open to "colored" guests, and it was regularly visited by African Americans who had business downtown.

== Architecture ==
The Norwood Tower is a sixteen-story steel-frame building clad with precast concrete panels. Its design exemplifies the Gothic Revival (or "Commercial Gothic") architectural style common among 1920s-era Texas high-rise buildings, with its vertical lines, Gothic tracery, pinnacled roof line and gargoyles; the tower remains the only high-rise building in Austin built in this style. The building was designed by local architects Bertram Giesecke and August Watkins "Watt" Harris. The general contractor for its construction was Frank Barron.

The first thirteen floors of the tower hold commercial and office space. The fourteenth and fifteenth levels form a two-story penthouse apartment with rooftop gardens on the corners, while the sixteenth floor is a mechanical level, housing the building's elevator machinery.

=== Exterior ===
The tower rises vertically from a square base, maintaining its square cross section for the bottom thirteen stories. Above the thirteenth level the corners are set back, giving the penthouse on the fourteenth and fifteenth stories a cruciform floor plan. Above the fifteenth level the sides are also stepped back, giving the sixteenth level a narrower rectangular floor plan. The adjoining garage covers the bottom five stories of the tower on its north and west sides.

The main entry is in the south facade, which features seven arched openings at ground level, with entrance doors behind the central three and glazing over the outer four. The seven bays are separated by square piers, which become pilasters running vertically up the face of the tower above the first story. Between the pilasters, narrow vertical ribs divide each bay into thirds, with three narrow vertical windows in each bay at each level.

The spandrels between the first and second levels are decorated with blind tracery depicting organic patterns in relief, and those between the second and third levels are wrapped in a band of open-tracery quatrefoils, topped by a row of twenty-seven small gargoyles at the level of the third-story window sills. The spandrels between the twelfth and thirteenth levels are engraved with images of the Scales of Justice and the Caduceus, representing the legal and medical professionals who were the tower's first tenants.

At the top of the central bay, immediately below the roof line, is a large clock (no longer operating) with its face designed in the style of a rose window, surrounded by panels of blind tracery. At the various roof lines creating by the multiple setbacks, the pilasters and ribs terminate in elaborate decorative finials and gargoyles that combine to give the tower a pinnacled and complex silhouette. The other elevations of the building are similar to the south facade, though without the arched entry, lower gargoyles and clock face.

== See also ==
- National Register of Historic Places listings in Travis County, Texas
- Recorded Texas Historic Landmarks in Travis County
