= Wesley United Methodist Church (Austin, Texas) =

Historic church in Texas, United States

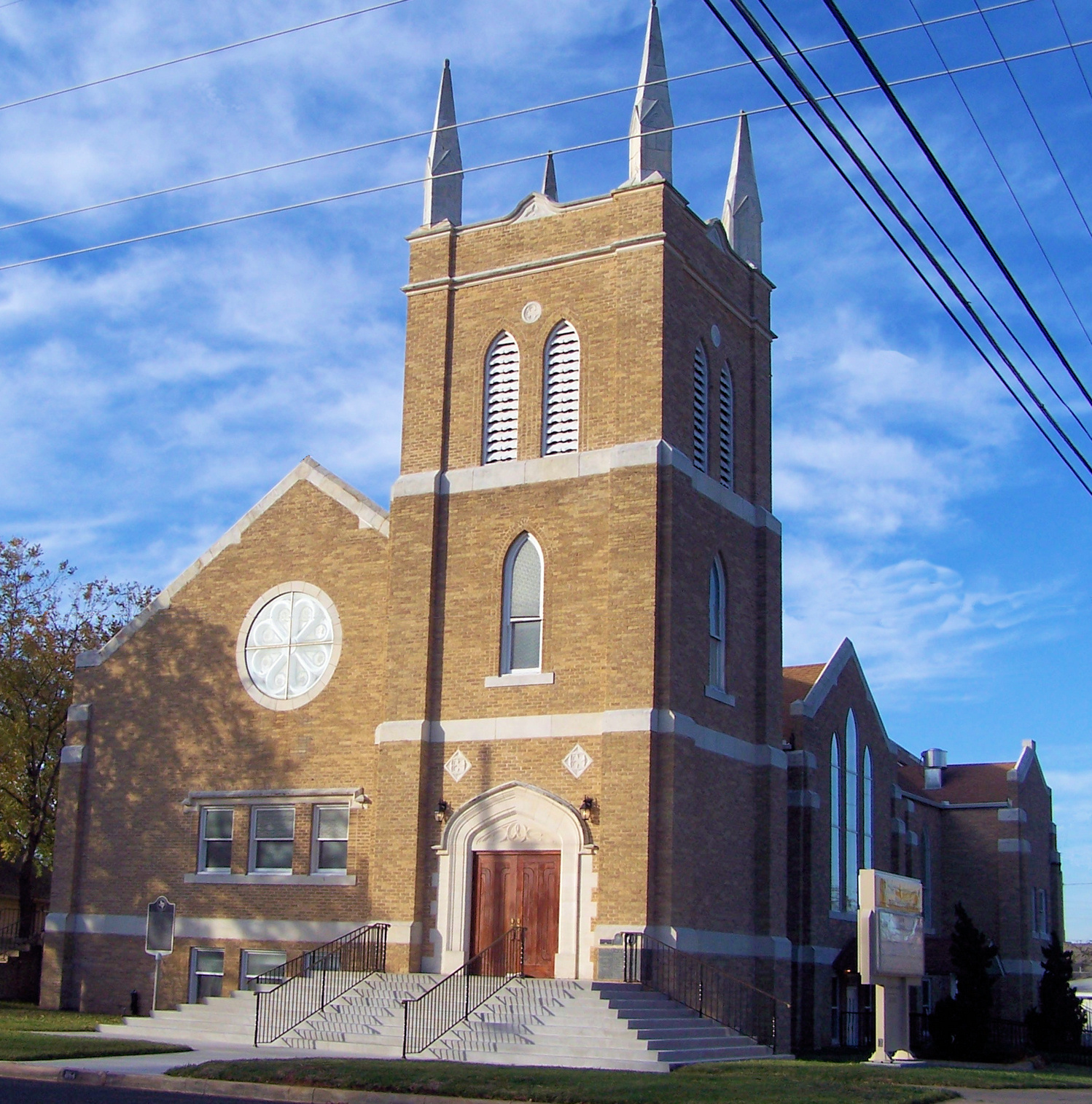
- 2006
- Wesley United Methodist Church
- Location: 1164 San Bernard St; Austin, Texas 78702
- Country: USA
- Denomination: United Methodist Church
- Previous denomination: Methodist Episcopal Church

History
- Former name: Wesley Chapel Church
- Status: Church
- Founded: March 4, 1865 (congregation); 1882 (original building)

Architecture
- Functional status: Active
- Heritage designation: NRHP
- Designated: 1985
- Groundbreaking: Spring 1882

Administration
- Division: Southwest Texas Conference
- District: Austin
- Wesley United Methodist Church
- U.S. National Register of Historic Places
- Location: 1164 San Bernard St. Austin, Texas, USA
- Coordinates: 30°16′11″N 97°43′34″W
- Built: 1929
- MPS: East Austin MRA
- NRHP reference No.: 85002281
- Added to NRHP: September 17, 1985

The Wesley United Methodist Church in Austin, Texas, United States, was founded in 1865, at the end of the American Civil War. Its original members were Austin-area freedmen, and it remains a predominantly African-American congregation. On March 4, 1865, the Reverend Joseph Welch, presiding elder of the Texas District of the Mississippi Mission Conference of the Methodist Episcopal Church, presided over the meeting at which Wesley was founded. This historical meeting was held in the basement of the old Tenth Street M. E. Church, South in Austin, Texas.

The day following the founding of Wesley, the first quarterly conference of the new church was held. The first trustees were Milton Wright, Thomas Merridy, Tom King, Simon Dedrick, Grant Woods, Henry Shelly, Samuel Hamilton, and Reverend Isaac Wright. Isaac Wright was also the first pastor of Wesley. This tenure of service covered the formative period from March 1865 to January 1868.

The West Texas Conference of the Methodist Episcopal Church was organized on January 22, 1874. Included among the ministers present at the organizational meeting of the conference was the first pastor of Wesley, Isaac Wright.

When the church was opened for membership at least 275 persons joined. Assisting Wright were the ministers Friend, Spencer Hardwell, and John Boyd, each of whom subsequently served as pastor of Wesley. These ministers and the Rev. B. F. Williams led the congregation during the nine years from the founding of the church until the organization of the West Texas Conference in 1874.

The first church building was erected under the leadership of Bishop Abraham Grant and the Rev. B. F. Williams, who served as pastor in 1874–75. This church was located in what is now downtown Austin, on the corner of Fourth Street and Congress Avenue. One historical account of the Wesley of that day includes the following description:

"The dimensions were about 40x60 feet." The floor was of dirt. The steps were logwood. The seating capacity was small. The benches were made of slab board. There was a lamp irregularly kept, fastened to the side of the wall. When this lamp was installed in place of the individual candles, there was great rejoicing."

As Wesley progressed, it broadened its scope and attracted new members, and in less than two decades a larger building was needed; in the spring of 1882, the cornerstone was laid for a new church at the corner of Ninth and Neches Streets. This building, containing approximately twice the floor space of the "First Wesley", was completed at an estimated cost of US$22,000, exclusive of church furniture valued at over $2,500.

The new church had a pastor's study, a library for Sunday School books and literature, choir materials, and a six-room parsonage for the minister. For several years Samuel Huston College (now Huston–Tillotson University) held most of its classes in the church.

By the end of the second decade of the 20th century, not only had Wesley Methodist Church grown, but also the city of Austin had become a major urban community in Central Texas. There was a need to expand the facilities of the Austin Public Schools (former name of the school district during the era of segregation) now known as the Austin Independent School District (AISD). Therefore, in 1928, the Austin School Board acquired the properties of the church for $17,500. Earlier, under the ministerial leadership of the Reverend L. H. Richardson, the church purchased a plot of ground facing Hackberry, Navasota, and San Bernard Streets for future use.

Under the pastoral administration of the Rev. W. L. Turner, a new church ("Greater Wesley") was built at this East Austin location at a cost of approximately $50,000, supported by the members of the church with the cooperation of the citizens of Austin.

Wesley Methodist Church became Wesley United Methodist Church in 1968 at the time of the general church merge.

Wesley United Methodist Church was the founding institution for the Austin Area Urban League, incorporated in the mid-1970s under the leadership of the Rev. Freddie B. Dixon Sr., First Board Chairman, Bertrand Adam, Linda Moore Smith, and Wesley members who served on the founding committee. A Special Task Force was set up to help alleviate the high suspension rate of African-American students in the Austin Independent School District. The Task Force met with the Austin Independent School District Officials and offered to do a joint venture project to alleviate the suspension problem in the public schools. Wesley obtained a private grant from the Kellogg Foundation and started the Wesley Center housed on the church grounds in co-operation with the Austin Independent School District. Texas Legislatures passed new laws regarding suspension centers in the public schools. The Wesley Center relocated to the Rosewood Elementary School, later renamed the F. R.Rice School.

The Church continued formed another Special Task Force in the 1980s headed by the Rev. Freddie B Dixon Sr., members of Wesley and community leaders, under the auspices of the Forming the Future Bond Project of the Austin Independent School District. The purpose of the Task Force was to address the Court Order Decision for a new Kealing Junior High School in the Austin community. The African-American community of Austin did not want the African-American junior high to be closed, so the task force was responsible for developing a plan of action for the construction of a new Kealing Junior High School. The Task Force presented a detailed Master Plan for the construction of a new Kealing Junior High on the site of the existing facility. The Master Plan for a new Kealing was adopted by the Austin Independent School District Trustees to be included in the Forming the Future Bond Package which was approved and passed by the voters of the Austin community. In 1986, a new Kealing Junior School was built which included an academic magnet program with a focus on math and science. In 1993, a liberal arts component was later added to the magnet program. In 2004, the school later became Kealing Middle School.

Wesley United Methodist Church during the 1970s and 1980s developed a Church Master Plan for renovating the historical church structure and acquisition of adjacent land. This Master Plan was begun in the early 1980, extending beyond 2000. The task was completed without borrowing, to the extent that over ten years, over $200,000 was raised in cash by Wesley members. Adjacent properties were acquired during this period, and membership grew.

Bishop Ernest T. Dixon was named the first African-American leader of the Southwest Texas Conference. His son, Dr. Freddie B, Dixon Sr., pastor of Wesley United Methodist Church, led the dedication ceremonies on February 13, 1983.

In 1985 Wesley United Methodist Church was recognized as a National Site by the National Register of Historic Places. The United Methodist Church (Site No.126) recognized Wesley United Methodist Church as a Historic Structure.

In 1988 the Wesley Endowment Fund was established to provide educational stipends to Wesley youth graduating from high school and preparing to enter higher education. As of 2011 approximately 55 students had received stipends of $500 each. The scholarship program provides scholarships to children and grandchildren of members of Wesley.

In 2003 Wesley United Methodist Church was designated a Five Star Church by the Southwest Texas Conference. New ministries were added, and an educational director named to develop programs for the youth and children of the church.

WESLEY'S PASTORS

- Isaac Wright 1865–68
- Brother Friend 1868–70
- John Boyd 1870–72
- Spencer Hardwell 1872–74
- B. F. Williams 1874–75
- Samuel Gates 1875–76
- C. L. Madison 1876–78
- Daniel Gregory 1878–79
- C. L. Madison 1879–81
- A. R. Norris 1881–83
- Harry Swann 1883–85
- Mack Henson 1885–89
- P. M. Carmichae1 1889–91
- C. L. Madison 1891–93
- Andrew Foster 1893–95
- John T. Gibbons 1895–96
- A. M. Mason 1896-(Unexpired term)
- Andrew Foster 1896–97
- G. R. Bryant 1897–00
- D. C. Lacy 1900–03
- Moses Smith 1903–07
- T. H. Wyatt 1907–10
- L. H. Richardson 1910–14
- J. W, Warren 1910–14
- G. A. Des1andes 1918–20
- A. D. Jacques 1920–21
- R. M. Davis 1921–24
- L. H. Richardson 1924–25
- T. H. Wyatt 1925–27
- W. L. Turner 1927–31
- C. W. Whitiker 1931–41
- V. A. Cooke (Assoc.)
- G. A. Des1andes 1941–42
- R. D. Young 1942–48
- J. G. Owens 1948–52
- R. S. Mosby 1952–58
- 0. B. Coe 1958–60
- P. L. Woods 1960–68
- Jacob H. Carruthers 1968–73
- Freddie B. Dixon Sr. 1973–94
  - Rosie L. Johnson (Assoc.)1993-96
- Sylvester E. Chase Jr. From 1994 - 2025
- Marcus A. L. Freeman, III From 2025–Present

== See also ==
- National Register of Historic Places listings in Travis County, Texas
