= Haehnel Building =

Commercial building in Austin, Texas, U.S.

- U.S. National Register of Historic Places
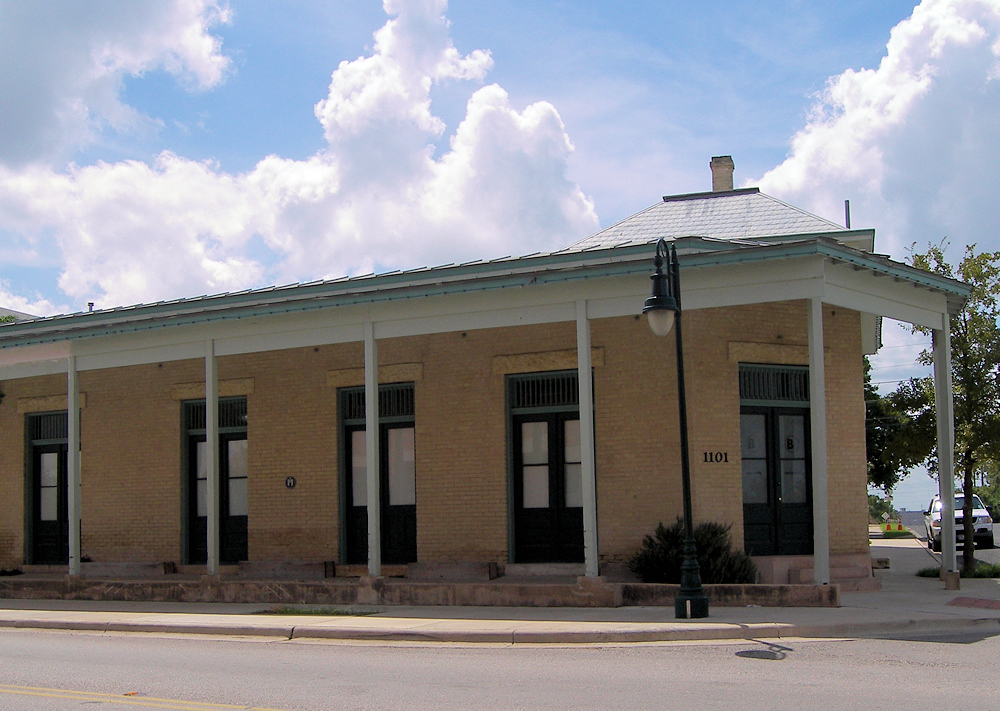
- The Haehnel Building in 2007
- Location: Austin, Texas, U.S.
- Coordinates: 30°16′8″N 97°43′45″W
- Built: c. 1880
- MPS: East Austin MRA
- NRHP reference No.: 85002295
- Added to NRHP: September 17, 1985

The Haehnel Building is a historic commercial building in east-central Austin, Texas, United States. The building was constructed c. 1880 and served many commercial purposes throughout the 20th century. It was known as Shorty's Bar, a popular hangout for the local population (largely African-American).

In 1999 the building underwent a renovation as part of a larger renewal project for east downtown Austin.

The building is located at 1101 E. 11th Street. It was added to the National Register of Historic Places on September 17, 1985.

== See also ==
- National Register of Historic Places listings in Travis County, Texas
