= Hyde Park Presbyterian Church (Austin, Texas) =

Historic church in Austin, Texas

- U.S. National Register of Historic Places
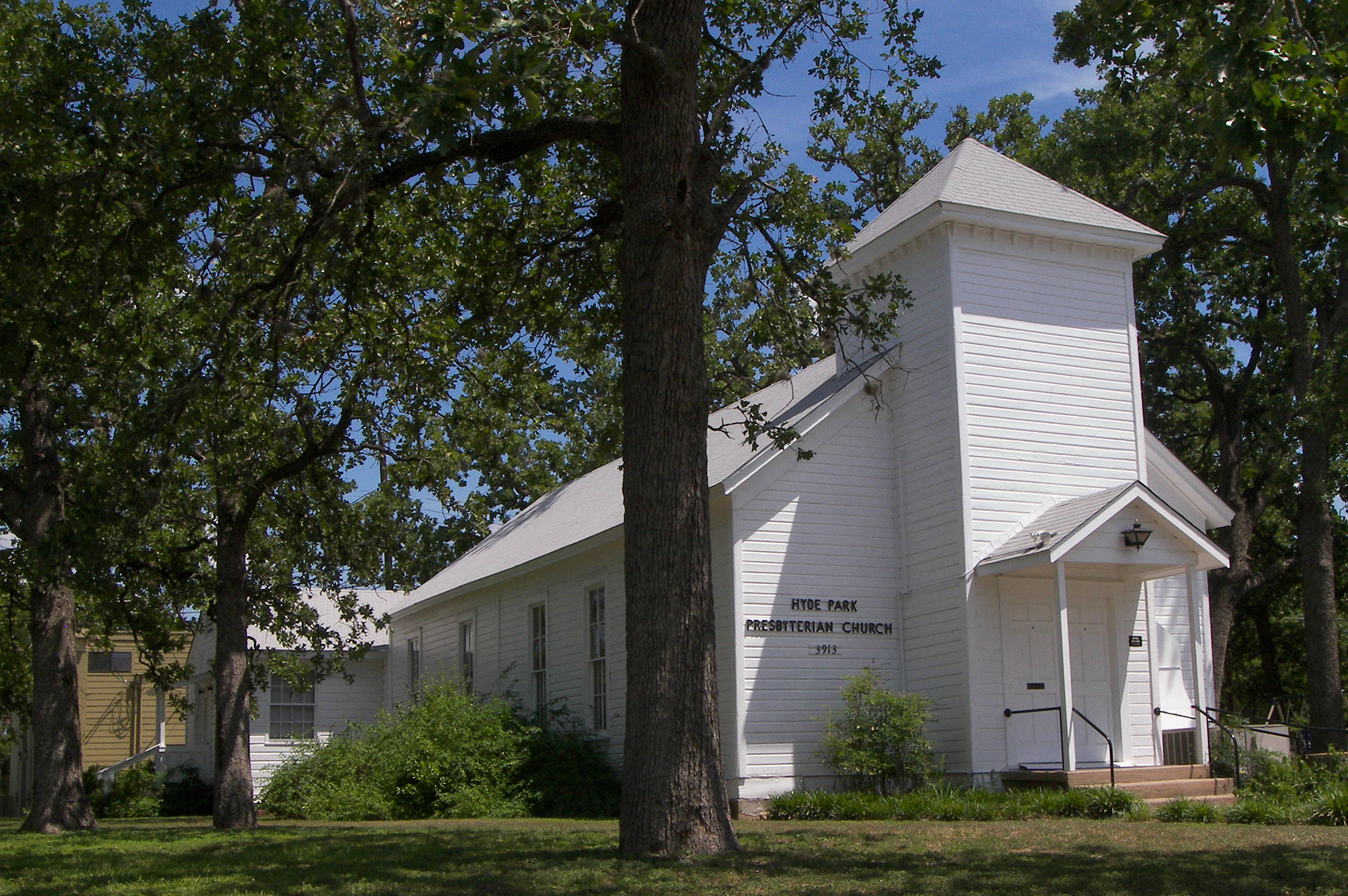

- Location within Texas Location within the United States
- Location: 3915 Avenue B Austin, Texas, US
- Coordinates: 30°18′14.5″N 97°44′4.6″W
- Area: less than one acre
- Built: 1896
- Architectural style: Vernacular Ecclesiastical
- MPS: Hyde Park MPS
- NRHP reference No.: 90001175
- Added to NRHP: August 16, 1990

Hyde Park Presbyterian Church is a historic church in Austin, Texas, United States. The structure was built in 1896 in the Hyde Park neighborhood for the Hyde Park Baptist Church and moved to its present location in 1921. It has been listed on the National Register of Historic Places since 1990.

== History ==
In June 1894, residents of the streetcar suburb of Hyde Park in Austin, Texas, organized to form a Baptist congregation. Calling themselves the Hyde Park Baptist Church, they planned and constructed a church building on land in the neighborhood donated by their preacher, completing the church in 1896. Separately, in 1909 a group of neighborhood Presbyterians and seminarians from Austin Presbyterian Theological Seminary looking to found a congregation approached Hyde Park developer Monroe M. Shipe to request the donation of a land lot for their church.

By this time the Baptist congregation had grown enough to need a larger meeting hall, and Shipe arranged a complicated exchange between the three parties: the Presbyterians would purchase the existing church building from the Baptists, on the condition that they would then relocate it to a new lot, donated by Shipe, next door to a saloon that Shipe wanted to drive out of his neighborhood. Texas law prohibited the sale of alcohol near churches, so bringing the church to the saloon would force the saloon to move out. The exchange was made, and the Hyde Park Presbyterian Church took over the reassembled building at its new site in 1910.

The Presbyterian Church was disassembled and moved again in 1921 to its present location, at the corner of 40th Street and Avenue B in Hyde Park. A small classroom was added to the rear of the building some time after World War II, thought to have originated as a surplus building from nearby Camp Swift. In 1990 the church was listed on the National Register of Historic Places in recognition of its historic church architecture.

== Architecture ==
Hyde Park Presbyterian Church is a one-story wood-frame building with weatherboard siding, built in a relatively unadorned, vernacular style. The sanctuary is a single rectangular space, accessed through a double-door main entrance in an open church porch on the western façade. The western entry passes through a protruding two-story tower topped by a pyramidal hip roof with a dentillated molding. The north and south sides each feature five tall, narrow double-hung windows.

The tower-fronted sanctuary design is characteristic of American Baptist religious architecture, and the simple form and understated aesthetic are typical of frontier churches built by their own congregants. Elements of the design were inspired by the Hyde Park Pavilion, a neighborhood community center and event venue where the Baptist congregation met prior to building itself a place of worship. A one-story classroom building at the rear is of later construction and differs from the sanctuary in its architectural details.

== See also ==
- National Register of Historic Places listings in Travis County, Texas
