= East Cesar Chavez, Austin, Texas =

Neighborhood of Austin, Texas

Coordinates: 30.2588°N 97.7295°W

Neighborhood map

East César Chávez, historically and originally named Masontown or Masonville, is a neighborhood in Austin, Texas. It is located in the central-east part of Austin's urban core on the north bank of the Colorado River. The neighborhood encompasses much of ZIP code 78702.

The East César Chávez neighborhood is bounded to the south by Lake Lady Bird and Festival Beach, the east by Chicon Street and the Holly neighborhood, and to the north by East Sixth Street and the Central East Austin neighborhood. To the west, East César Chávez faces Interstate 35 and the Rainey Street district, a historic neighborhood in the southeast corner of Downtown Austin.

The dominant land use in East César Chávez is residential, with approximately 60% of total land use being identified as single-family residential. The neighborhood contains the Willow-Spence Streets Historic District, a residential area located south of César Chávez Boulevard that was added to the National Register of Historic Places in 1985.

== History ==
The East César Chávez neighborhood is among Austin's oldest. Many of its homes were built in the early 20th century. Their turn-of-the-century homes were more modest ("vernacular") versions of ornate Victorian houses seen elsewhere in the city.

The area north of Third Street and south of Sixth Street, from Waller to Chicon, was originally settled by freed slaves following the Emancipation Proclamation. It was originally called Masontown or Masonville, after brothers Sam and Raiford who bought the property in 1867. At one time the community had two Baptist churches and as many as 200 residents. By the 1980s, however, Masonville was no longer identifiable as a distinct neighborhood. Like contemporary settlements elsewhere in Austin Clarksville and Wheatville, the area around Masonville today bears few traces of its original population.

In 1999 the City of Austin adopted a new "Neighborhood Plan" for East César Chávez. One of the hallmarks of this was the promotion of mixed-use development, in a neighborhood dominated by single-family homes. New mixed-use properties were built throughout the 2000s in accordance with the plan, which had a gentrifying effect on the neighborhood. According to the City of Austin's Department of Planning, property value in East Austin's 78702 ZIP code increase more than 100 percent from 2000 to 2005. Census Bureau data shows that African-American population in East Austin drastically reduced from 1990 to 2000, from 80 percent to less than 20 percent in some areas.

== Demographics ==
According to data from the U.S. Census Bureau collected in 2009, the population of the area defined as East César Chávez was 3,819, across an area of 0.784 square miles. The population density per square miles is 4,870 people per square miles, compared to 2,610 in the city as a whole. The racial breakdown is 75% Hispanic/Latino, 16% white, 6% black and 3% other. The median ages of males and females in the neighborhood are 31.2 and 35.8, compared with a citywide average of 29.6 for males and 30.2 for females, respectively. The median household income in 2009 for East César Chávez residents was $23,227, compared with $50,132 in Austin at large. In 2009, the average estimated value of detached houses in the area was $106,151 (54.8% of all units), compared with $286,025 for the rest of the city.

== Education ==
The neighborhood is zoned to the Austin Independent School District.

- Sanchez Elementary School
- Martin Middle School
- Eastside Memorial High School
