= Scottish Rite Dormitory =

- U.S. National Register of Historic Places
- Recorded Texas Historic Landmark
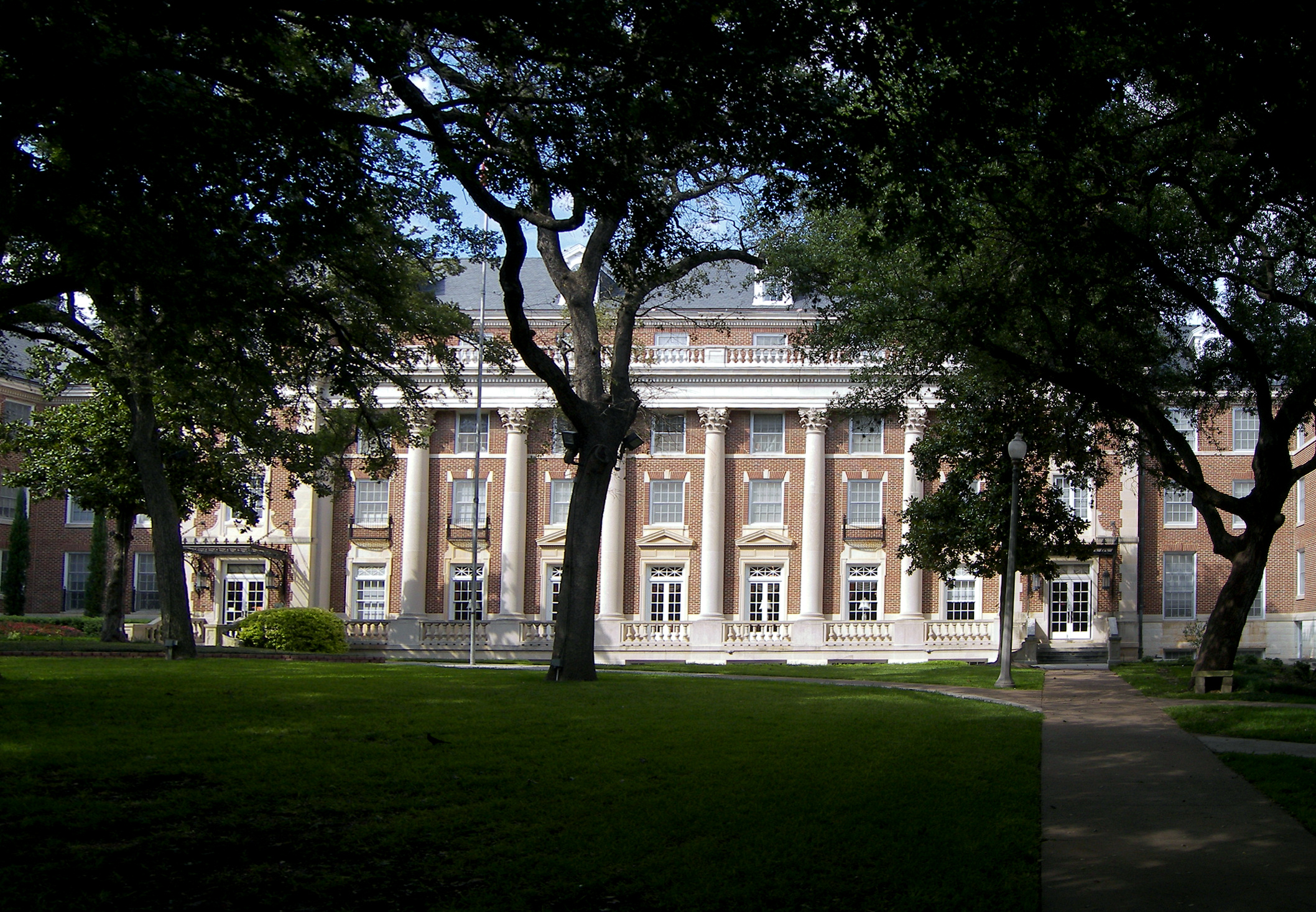
- The Scottish Rite Dormitory in 2007
- Location: 210 W. 27th St; Austin, Texas, USA
- Coordinates: 30°17′33″N 97°44′22″W
- Built: 1922
- Architect: Herbert M. Greene
- Architectural style: Colonial Revival
- NRHP reference No.: 98000404
- RTHL No.: 15644

Significant dates
- Added to NRHP: April 23, 1998
- Designated RTHL: 1967

The Scottish Rite Dormitory (SRD) is a private women's dorm for the University of Texas built and operated by the Scottish Rite of Freemasons in Austin, Texas. Located just north of campus on 27th Street and Whitis Avenue, the Colonial Revival style building was completed in 1922 during a housing shortage on campus and was intended to provide housing for the daughters and relatives of Master Masons.

Since its origin the building has relaxed its entry requirements somewhat, but is still well known among UT students for its strict rules only allowing male visitors during certain hours. Many girls are wait-listed for entry to the dorm beginning in high school or earlier. Residents are often referred to as SaRDines. The dorm also employs young men as waiters and dishwashers.

Old jokes about poor institutional food, especially in dormitories have never applied to SRD. Girls who have lived there usually mention the food first when expressing their feelings about the dormitory. One special dessert every SRD alumni nostalgically remembers is Chocolate Crumble Balls (CCB's). In addition to daily meals, the kitchen staff prepared special refreshments for birthday dinners, pajama parties, and other special occasions, such as the spring formal.

== Early history ==
The plan for the Scottish Rite Dormitory began prior to 1920 due to shortage of housing for women around the University of Texas at Austin. Initially started in 1920 in a boarding house near its current location, the construction of the building took two years and opened in 1922. Funds were raised to complete the project by the Texas Scottish Rite Educational Association, headed by president Samuel Cochran (1855-1936). The Scottish Rite Dormitory building at 210 W. 27th, known as the "Grande Dame" by some celebrated 100 years in 2022.

=== Architecture and Design ===
Scottish Rite Dormitory was designed by Herbert Miller Greene, a prominent Dallas architect and active member of the Masons who in the early 1920s was chosen by the UT Board of Regents to become the university's official architect. Over the course of the next decade he designed a number of buildings for the Austin campus in the prevailing Mediterranean-influenced Beaux-Arts style, among them Garrison Hall, Littlefield Dormitory, the Biology Building, Gregory Gymnasium, the Chemistry Building, and Waggener Hall. Scottish Rite Dormitory was added to the National Register of Historic Places in 1998.

== Dorm Lore ==
Memories of SRD abound with tales of fun with friends, attempts at sneaking in boys, late night food runs after curfew, and an array of other adventures. Ghost stories are also part of the legend and take on a different tone from decade to decade. One that has stood the test of time features the girl who is said to have jumped from the empty elevator shaft after losing her love in WWII. Many of the waiters from the late 1930's to the late 1940's (known as the SRD Dark Horses) served in WWII, so losing a boyfriend in the war was a real possibility for young women during that era.

== Controversy ==
In November 2018, dormitory director Mary Mazurek and registrar Meshelle Bourne asked student Kaj Baker to meet with them to discuss guest rules. Baker was told she was no longer allowed to bring in guests for the rest of the semester after spending nights studying with her girlfriend in the SRD lounge. Baker claims Mazurek and Bourne took action because some of the residents in the dorm were not comfortable with Baker's sexual orientation despite no rule violations.

== See also ==
- National Register of Historic Places listings in Travis County, Texas
