= Anderson Stadium =

Historic football stadium in east Austin, Texas

Coordinates: 30°16′12″N 97°42′36″W

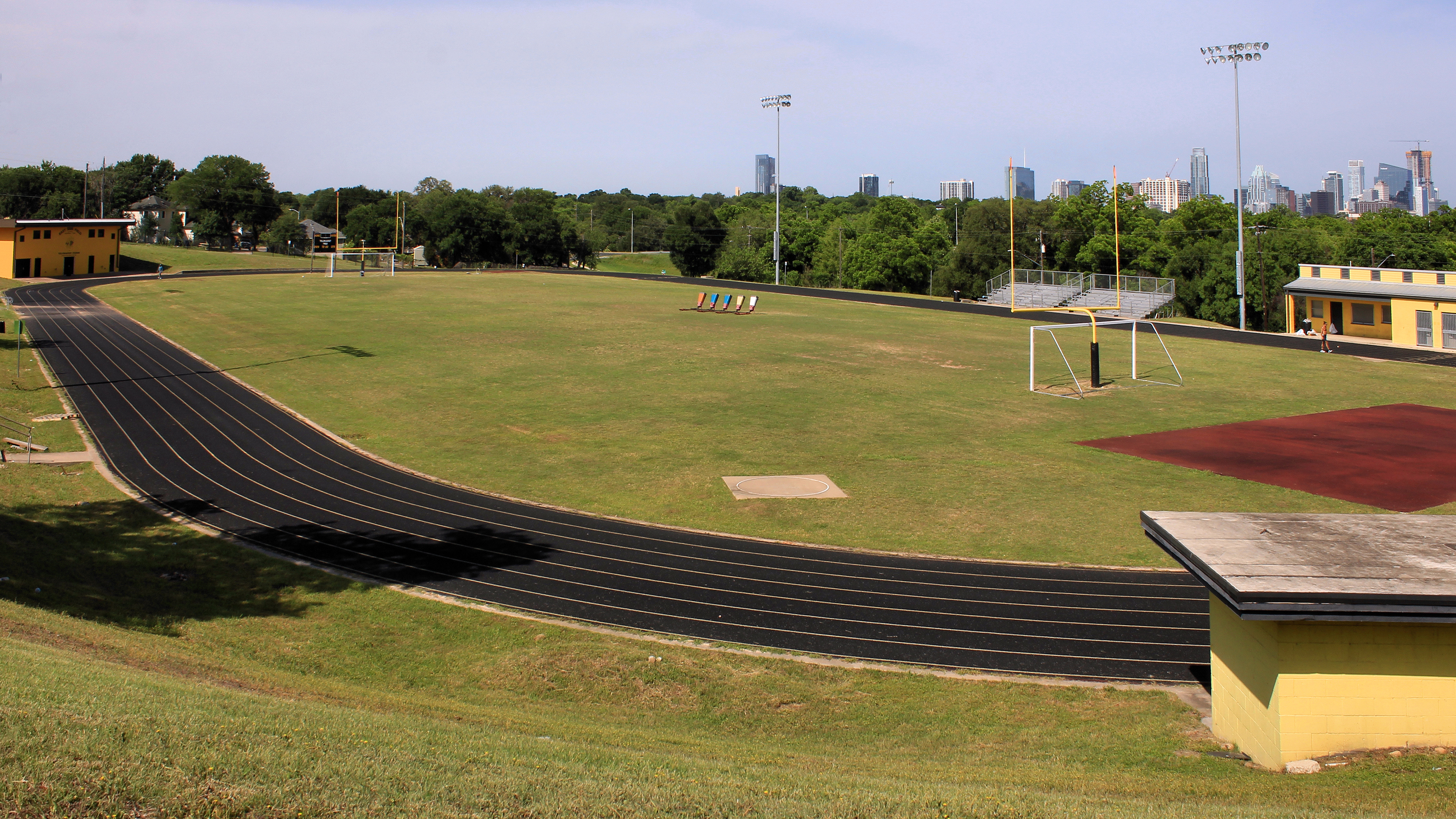
- Viewed from the slope to the northeast
- Interactive map of Anderson Stadium
- Address: Austin, Texas; United States
- Type: Stadium
- Acreage: 7 acres (2.8 ha)

Construction
- Built: 1953
- Renovated: 1993–1994
- Anderson Stadium
- U.S. National Register of Historic Places
- Location within Texas Location within the United States
- NRHP reference No.: 100007202
- Added to NRHP: February 3, 2022

Anderson Stadium, also known as Yellow Jacket Stadium, is a historic football and track and field facility in East Austin, Texas. The stadium was built in 1953 as the football facility on what was then the campus of L.C. Anderson High School, Austin's only public high school open to African Americans under racial segregation. Closed in 1971 as part of a school integration plan and restored in the 1990s, Anderson Stadium was added to the National Register of Historic Places in 2022.

== History ==
After the publication of the 1928 Austin city plan, the municipal government of Austin, Texas, made a policy of encouraging racial segregation in the city by concentrating "separate but equal" public amenities for African American citizens in East Austin. These included one Austin Public Schools high school for black students, L.C. Anderson High School. When Anderson High School moved to a new site in 1953, the new campus was built with its own football and track and field facility with stadium seating, an unusual feature at a time when most black high schools in Texas had to share sports facilities with nearby schools for white students. Anderson's Friday night games and frequent community events made the stadium an important public space in the East Austin black community.

Anderson Stadium, also known as Yellow Jacket Stadium (after the Anderson High School mascot), was used actively from its construction in 1953 through 1971, during which time the Anderson football team and marching band both won state championships in the Prairie View Interscholastic League. During the 1950s and 1960s the facility was gradually improved, with additional bleachers, a press box, a fieldhouse, a ticket booth, and a concession stand all added to the original construction. Important games drew crowds of more than 8,000, and attendees often included white spectators, such as University of Texas football coach Darrell K Royal.

In the late 1960s, the federal Department of Health, Education, and Welfare investigated the status of school integration in Texas and found Austin out of compliance, partly because Anderson's student body was still almost exclusively black. After years of efforts to persuade white students to voluntarily enroll at Anderson largely failed, a series of steps by HEW and the school district culminated in the closure of Anderson High School after the 1971 school year. In 1972, the newly established Austin Community College took over Anderson as its first site (later known as the Ridgeview Campus), and ACC paved over the stadium's football field to make a parking lot for commuter students. The original bleachers, goal posts, scoreboard, and concession stand were demolished during this period. The ACC campus closed in 1989, after which the site was used as the Austin Independent School District's Alternative Learning Center.

In 1993, Anderson alumnus and former National Football League player Thomas Henderson proposed to restore Anderson Stadium so that it could be used as a community center. Donations and volunteer work in the 1990s drove the restoration of the grass field and the replacement of the running track, goal posts, and scoreboard. New bleachers, high-mast lighting, and a concession and restroom building were also added. Further improvements in the 2000s and 2010s include an enlarged concession and restroom building, an improved running track, and a new fieldhouse. In 2021, the campus was reopened as the site of Eastside High School.

Anderson Stadium was listed on the National Register of Historic Places on February 3, 2022, in recognition of its historical significance as the last extant high school football stadium in Texas constructed exclusively for African Americans, as well as its importance as a shared event space for the East Austin black community.

== Design ==
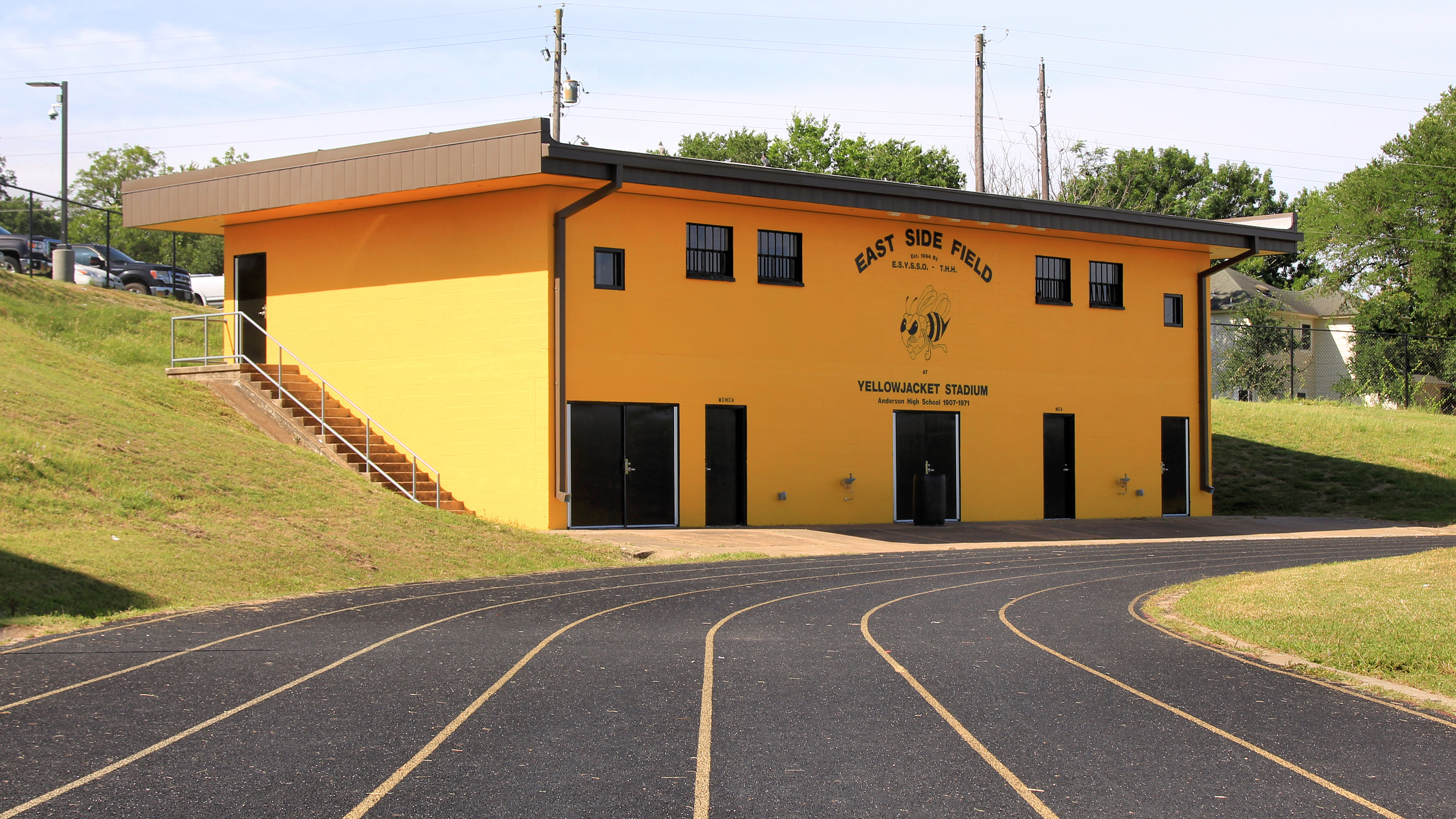
The stadium fieldhouse.

Anderson Stadium is a typical high school football and track facility, with a level grass playing field, oriented north-to-south, surrounded by an oval running track (originally of sand and dirt, but now surfaced in rubber). It sits in a slight depression in the surrounding topography, surrounded by a natural bowl-like landform whose slopes have served as additional seating space for large crowds. The field and track are flanked by the original two-story concrete fieldhouse and one-story concrete concession stand, along with a newer fieldhouse, concession stand, goal posts, high-mast lights, and scoreboard dating to the renovations of the 1990s. The original wooden bleachers have likewise been replaced with newer metal seating. The historic buildings are utilitarian and rectangular in design, built as simple concrete blocks, a reflection of the inferior investment made in a site intended for black students.

== See also ==
- National Register of Historic Places listings in Travis County, Texas
