= Central Christian Church (Austin, Texas) =

Historic church in Texas, United States

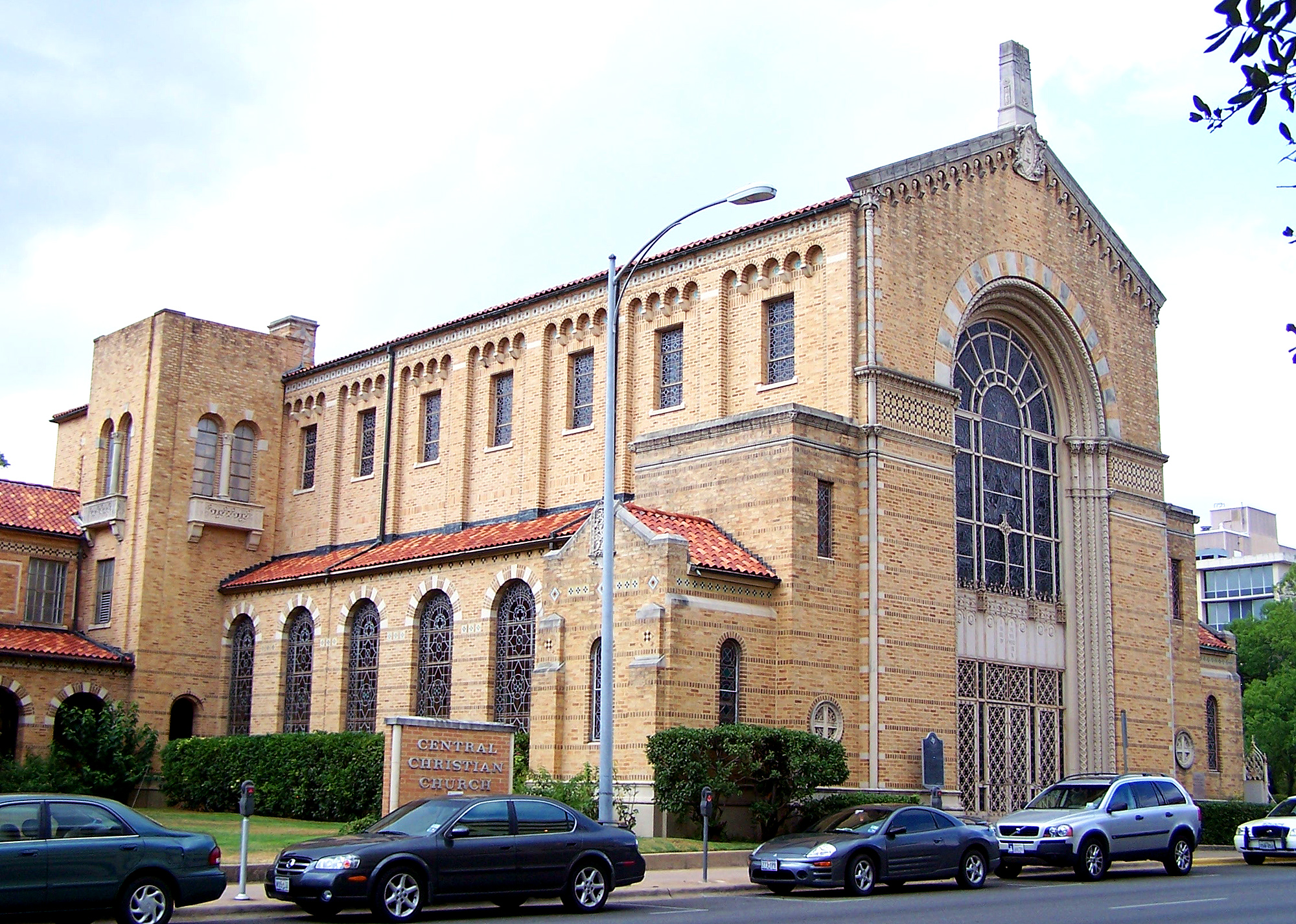
- Sanctuary viewed from the southeast in 2006

- Location within Texas Location within the United States
- 30°16′29″N 97°44′40″W
- Address: 1110 Guadalupe St. Austin, Texas 78701
- Country: United States
- Denomination: Christian Church (Disciples of Christ)
- Website: www.cccaustin.org

History
- Dedicated: November 24, 1929

Architecture
- Architect(s): Robert Leon White; Samuel Charles Phelps Vosper
- Architectural type: Romanesque Revival
- Years built: 1924–1929
- Construction cost: $200,000
- Central Christian Church
- U.S. National Register of Historic Places
- Area: less than one acre
- NRHP reference No.: 92000889
- Added to NRHP: July 16, 1992

Central Christian Church is a historic church in downtown Austin, Texas, affiliated with the Christian Church (Disciples of Christ). Organized in 1847, it is one of the oldest congregations in the city. The church has also been known as Christian Church of Austin. The current Romanesque Revival church building was completed in 1929. The building was added to the National Register of Historic Places in 1992.

== History ==
The Christian Church of Austin, a congregation of the Disciples of Christ, began meeting in Austin, Texas, in 1847 (only eight years after Austin's incorporation), making it one of the city's oldest churches. The congregation met in a local school for a time, then bought its first church building in 1867 at the intersection of 8th Street and Colorado Street, where it met until the 1920s. In the early twentieth century, the congregation changed its name to Central Christian Church, to distinguish itself from other Disciples of Christ congregations that had formed elsewhere in the growing city.

By 1924 the church had grown enough to purchase a larger lot at the corner of 12th Street and Guadalupe Street and plan the construction of a larger building. By 1929 the new building was completed, and it was dedicated at a worship service on November 24, 1929. The entire church complex cost roughly $200,000 (equivalent to $3,800,000 in 2025). Central Christian Church became part of the Christian Church (Disciples of Christ) when the denomination was restructured in 1968. The church building was listed on the National Register of Historic Places on July 16, 1992, in recognition of the church's eclectic but historical religious architecture.

== Architecture ==
The Central Christian Church is a U-shaped complex, with a four-story sanctuary on the north, a three-story education building to the south, and a two-story wing linking their west ends. The sanctuary exhibits traditional basilica-plan Christian church architecture, with a nave, flanking aisles, and chancel oriented east-to-west. The exterior walls are of buff brick, with contrasting details of darker brick, cast stone, and glazed ceramic tiles; the complex is roofed in red mission tiles. The building is designed in a Romanesque Revival style, with the sanctuary's blunt, symmetrical façade, two-story aisles with clerestory, pervasive semicircular arches, and an ornamental arcade. The architects were Robert Leon White (a member of the congregation) and Samuel Charles Phelps Vosper; the construction contractor was R.F. Johnson.

=== Exterior ===
The main façade is on the east, with the main entrance to the sanctuary set in a 42-foot (13 m) high opening topped by a semicircular arch. The opening is framed by three concentric reveals, and the arch is topped by alternating voussoirs of brick and cast stone. The doors and their transom windows fill the lower third of the penetration, with a 4-foot (1.2 m) high engraved metal spandrel above these. The upper portion is filled by a stained-glass window depicting the resurrection of Jesus, surrounded by twelve roundels containing symbols of the twelve apostles. A parapet atop the gable is supported by an arcaded corbel table with mascarons inside the arches. A lozenge-shaped acroterium sits at the apex of the gable, surmounted by a trapezoidal cast-stone tablet depicting a low-relief cross.

The aisles project outward from the north and south walls of the sanctuary, each with five two-story arched windows of stained glass and a tiled pent roof. Above the aisle roofs, the walls are divided by pilasters into a series of bays with clerestory windows, topped by more arcaded corbel tables under the eaves. The west gable end of the sanctuary features a large blind arch, paralleling the arched entrance in the eastern façade. An two-story office wing fronted by a one-story arcade runs from the southwest corner of the sanctuary southward to the education building, outlining a courtyard between the three structures. A square three-and-a-half-story bell tower base protrudes into the northwest corner of the courtyard, though no tower was ever built atop it.

=== Interior ===
Inside the main sanctuary entrance on the east is a narthex with polychromatic tile flooring, separated from the nave by a wall of stained glass windows above a wooden dado, penetrated by double wood-paneled doors. Portals in the north and south walls of the narthex lead by stairs to the choir loft. The sanctuary holds a four-story nave flanked by two-story aisles, terminating in an elevated chancel at the west end. The nave is separated from the aisle on each side by an arcade of plaster columns with Byzantine capitals decorated with rope molding and leaf carvings. Semicircular arches above the columns support the clerestory walls. The ceiling features exposed rafters and king-post roof trusses, with decorative painted brackets supporting the trusses.

Two three-tiered chandeliers hang above the choir loft, and pendant lights hang in the aisles. Double-globe sconce lights on the clerestory walls light the nave. At the west end, an elevated platform for the chancel is separated from the nave by a wooden chancel rail, decorated with ceramic tiles representing the apostles. The west wall of the nave features a 40-foot (12 m) proscenium arch framing the chancel, with a coffered-plaster semi-dome over the apse. The baptistry stands above the rear of the apse, with an arched portal and pediment framing the baptismal font.

== See also ==
- National Register of Historic Places listings in Travis County, Texas
