= Bertram-class air-sea rescue boat =

Class overview
- Name: Bertram
- Builders: Bertram Boat Company, USA
- Operators: Royal Australian Navy
- Cost: $138,356 each
- Built: 1966
- In service: 1967 to 1988
- Completed: 2
- Active: 0
- Retired: 2

General characteristics
- Type: Air-sea rescue (planned); Harbour personnel carriers
- Displacement: 12 tons full load
- Length: 38 ft (12 m)
- Beam: 12 ft (3.7 m)
- Propulsion: Diesel, 2 GM 8V53 motors, 500 brake horsepower (370 kW)
- Speed: 22 knots (41 km/h; 25 mph)
- Range: 200 nautical miles (370 km; 230 mi)
- Complement: 2

The Bertram class was a two-ship class of air-sea rescue vessels of the Royal Australian Navy. Purchased to replace the old World War II class of 63-foot air-sea rescue vessel, they were found to be unsuitable for the proposed role. The vessels were subsequently employed as harbour personnel carriers and based at HMAS Waterhen. The vessels were disposed of in 1988.

== Ships ==
- 38101, launched in 1966 and in service in 1967
- 38102, launched in 1966 and in service in 1967
