= Bertrand Creek =

Stream in Washington and British Columbia

Coordinates: 48°54′44″N 122°32′05″W

Bertrand Creek is a stream in the U.S. state of Washington and the Canadian province of British Columbia. Bertrand Creek is 9.8 miles long and drains into the Nooksack River 3 miles south of Lynden. This cross-border stream is the largest lowland tributary of the Nooksack River.

Bertrand Creek was named after James Bertrand, a pioneer settler.

== See also ==
- List of rivers of Washington (state)
- List of rivers of British Columbia
