= Worrell–Ettlinger House =

Historic house in Texas, United States

- U.S. National Register of Historic Places
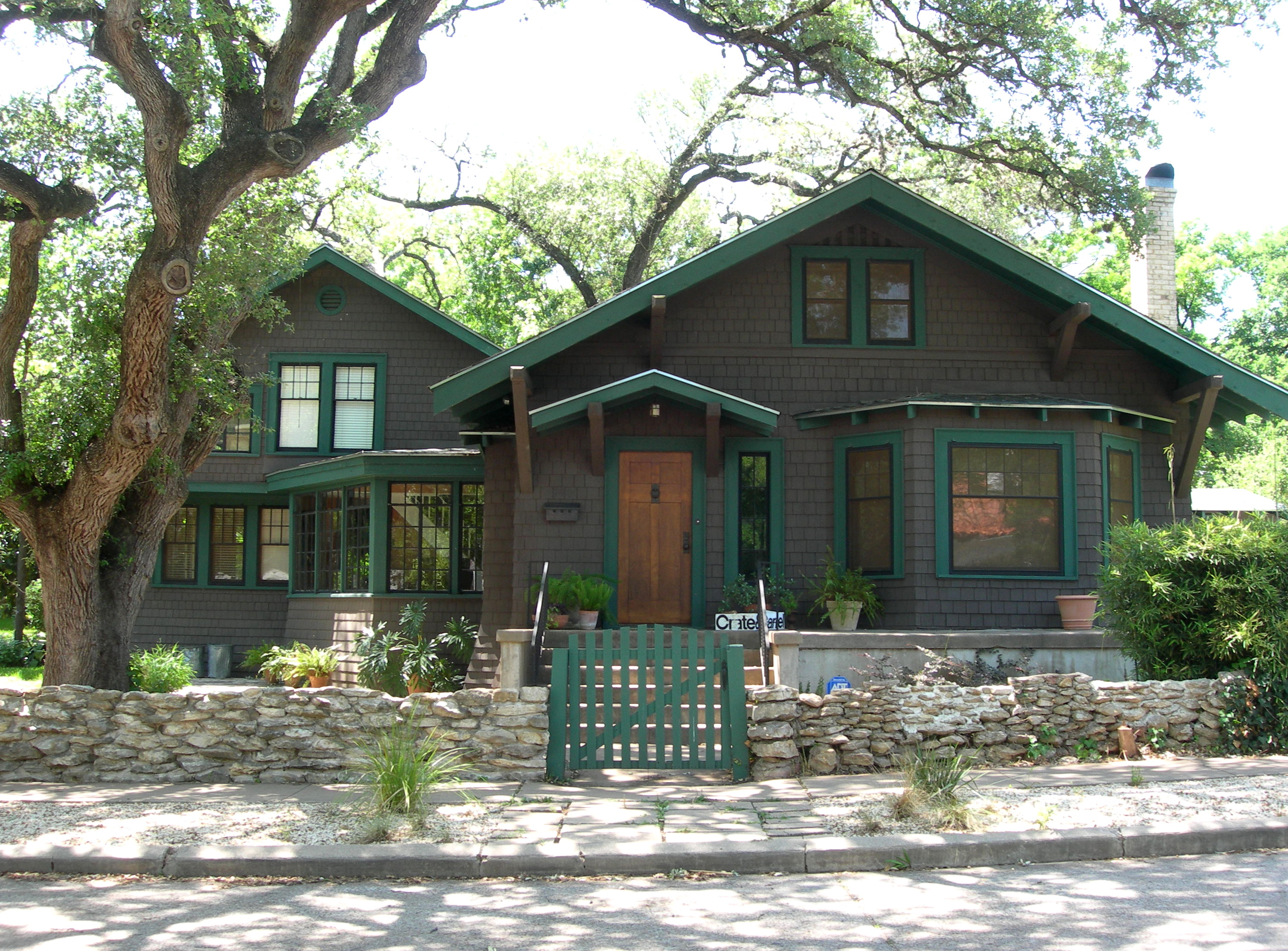
- Location: 3110 Harris Park Ave; Austin, Texas, USA
- Coordinates: 30°17′34″N 97°43′53″W
- Built: 1912
- NRHP reference No.: 04001152
- Added to NRHP: October 12, 2004

The Worrell–Ettlinger House is a historic Craftsman-style bungalow built in 1912 in Austin, Texas.

The home is located at 3110 Harris Park Avenue in the College Court neighborhood. It was added to the National Register of Historic Places on October 12, 2004.
