= Hancock Golf Course =

Golf course in Austin, Texas, United States

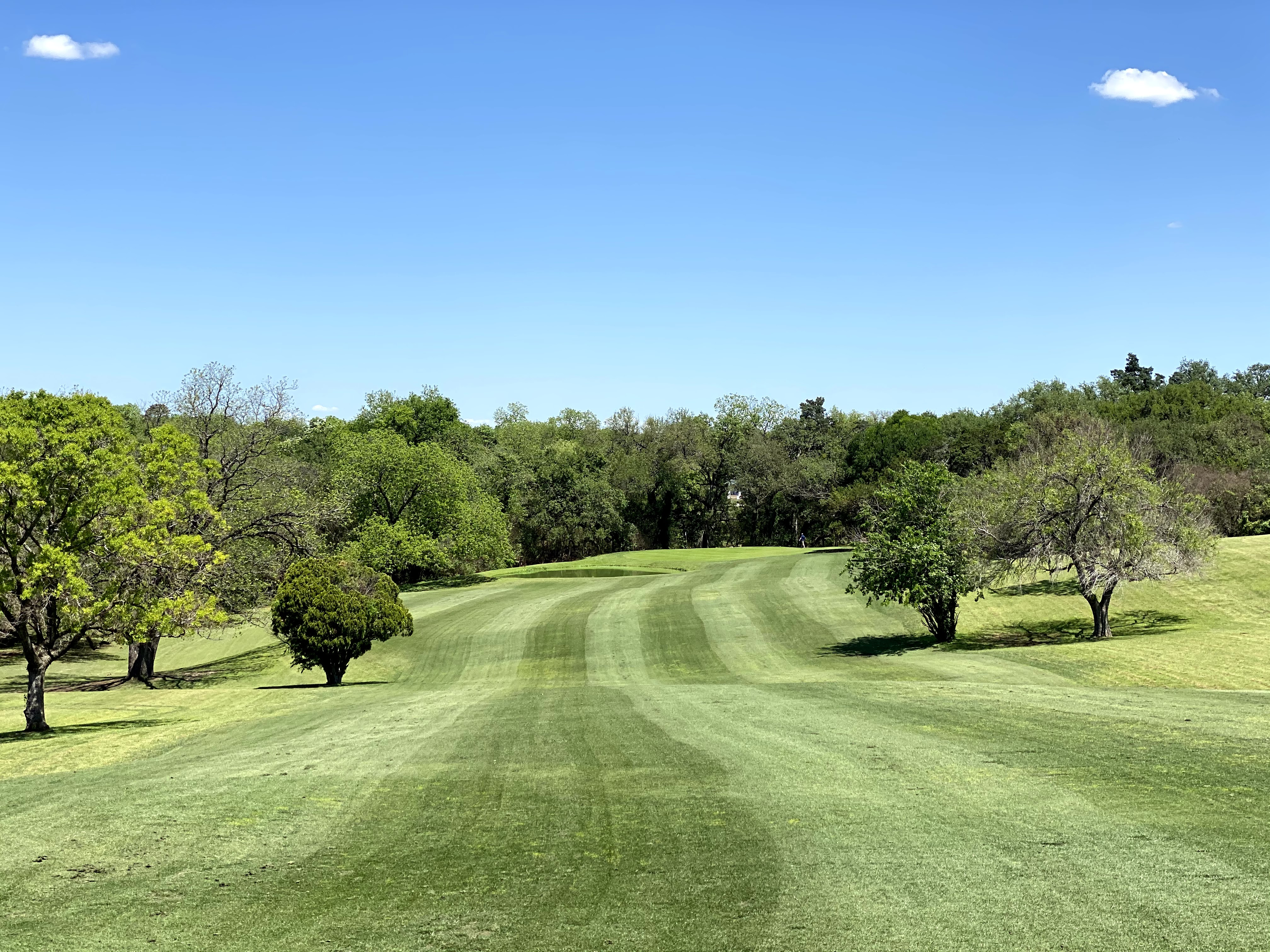
- Interactive map of Hancock Golf Course
- 30°17′56″N 97°43′31″W

Hancock Golf Course
- Designed by: Lewis Hancock
- Par: 35
- Length: 2,633 yards
- Course rating: 32.6
- Slope rating: 112

Hancock Golf Course is a municipal, 9-hole golf course in Austin, Texas. It is one of the oldest golf courses in Texas, established in 1899, and was the site of the original Austin Country Club. In Austin's Hancock neighborhood, it is where golf coach and instructor Harvey Penick learned the game.

It is considered the oldest continuously operated golf course west of the Mississippi River.

== History ==
Lewis Hancock was the son of a former member of the Texas House of Representatives, Harvard graduate, and in Austin was a banker and the owner of a popular Opera House. After friends of his had returned from Scotland, he grew intrigued by golf. Only Dallas and Galveston had courses in the state. Twenty-five of them put money together to start the "Austin Golf Club" and leased 100 acres north of the city.

Harvey Penick, a long-time instructor at Austin Country Club, got his start at this facility as a caddie, and grew up 10 blocks away on Cedar Street in North University. By 1913 the club expanded to 18 holes and purchased the property.

The original clubhouse building of Austin Country Club, opened in 1901, is a designated historic landmark, Old Golf Club House, at 512 E 39th St.

In 1946, Austin Country Club, seeking more land in order to build a course that could supplant Lions Municipal Golf Course as the premier course in the city, decided to move to the east side, and sold the land back to the City of Austin. In 1962, voters approved the sale of the back nine for the development of the Hancock shopping center. The original half of the course remains in a modified state. Waller Creek runs through the middle of the course.

In 2014, the Hancock golf course was added to the National Register of Historic Places.

== Shared use facilities ==
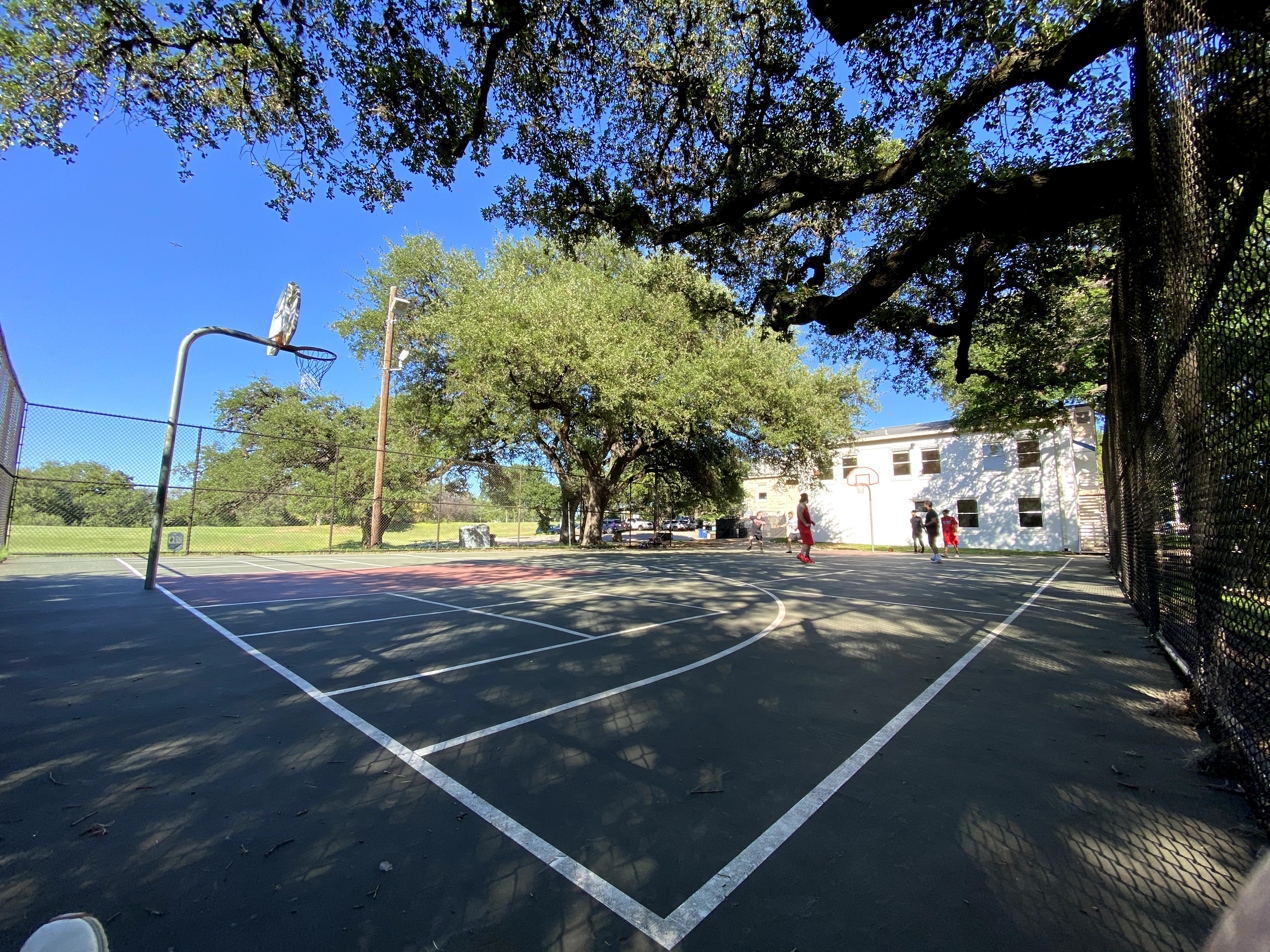

Hancock is a municipal golf facility that hosts a variety of other recreations and events. A 1.1-mile trail encircles the property. There is a playground, basketball court, small soccer field, and a clubhouse with regular programming and kids camps through the Austin parks department. There are bus stops on Red River and 38 1/2 streets.

=== 2020 budget meetings and proposal ===
Despite numerous renovations and enhancements in the 21st century, Hancock was regularly the facility within the Austin city parks division that lost the most money each year.

On March 1, 2020, The City of Austin Parks Department held an informational meeting at Hancock to discuss the future of the course. The staff stated that the parks department was losing money on the course, and needed to look at alternative management or uses for the land. From here, a group, the Hancock Golf Course Conservancy, was formed to support golf in its current form. A competing group was formed, Hancock Conservancy, whose mission was to transform the golf course to a public park.

=== Operations and budget post-Covid 19 pandemic ===
Just weeks after the meeting, the Covid-19 pandemic hit. Shortly after, and while the course was temporarily closed, golf experienced an explosion in popularity due to social distancing and remote working. Revenues for the course surged, and the course began operating in the green.

Since Covid, plans for a redesign of Hancock, or transition of operations to a third-party vendor or turn it into green space, have been tabled.

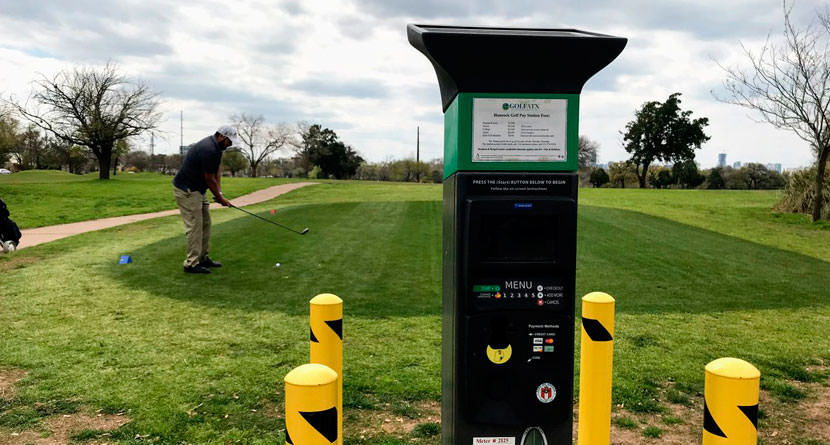
Pay station at Hancock golf course

=== Current Operations ===
As of 2026, Hancock is operated with a minimal staff from the golf division of the Austin Parks Department. There is no clubhouse operation. Golfers swipe a credit card at a pay station at the first tee. Sometimes there is a ranger on site; otherwise, the staff is mostly ground crew. There are no golf carts. Everyone walks, even in summer.
