= Willow–Spence Streets Historic District =

Historic district in Texas, United States

Coordinates: 30°15′33″N 97°44′4″W

- U.S. National Register of Historic Places
- U.S. Historic district
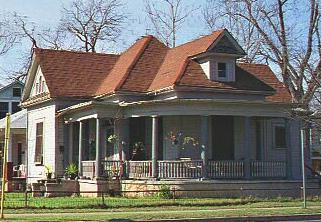
- House at Willow and San Marcos Streets
- Location: Portions of Willow, Spence, Canterbury, San Marcos & Waller Sts., Austin, Texas
- Area: 18 acres (7.3 ha)
- Built: 1880s-1930s
- Architectural style: Bungalow/craftsman, Gothic, Mission/Spanish Revival
- MPS: East Austin MRA
- NRHP reference No.: 85002264
- Added to NRHP: September 17, 1985

The Willow–Spence Streets Historic District is a neighborhood that lies east of downtown Austin, Texas. Its houses, churches, and commercial buildings were built in the early twentieth century. It is bounded roughly by Interstate 35 to the west, East César Chávez Street to the north, and Spence Street to the south. It extends a few houses east of San Marcos Street along Willow and Canterbury Streets. It thus includes portions of Willow, Spence, Canterbury, San Marcos, and Waller Streets. It was added to the National Register of Historic Places in 1985.

== Description and significance ==
According to the National Register, "the Willow–Spence Streets Historic District represents an unusually intact neighborhood of residences and compatible commercial and public buildings. Located largely on blocks and lots which were not finally platted and subdivided until after 1900, the residences in the District are architecturally intact for the most part; a number of them demonstrate fine craftsmanship and are among the best examples of vernacular building types which were once common in Austin after 1900, but which are rarely found in such large concentrations today. In a city where specific functions and services have been segregated from one another, the Willow–Spence Streets Historic District is a rare example of a neighborhood in which homes, businesses, and churches are fully integrated and architecturally compatible."

Although the historic district includes a few stores and churches, most of the buildings are single-family residential. The house at 81 Waller St. was constructed in the 1880s, but most were built between 1900 and the early 1930s. Most are simple, wood-frame cottages of late Victorian or Craftsman/Bungalow architecture. There is also a church, El Buen Pastor on Waller Street, that is Mission Revival in style.

== History ==
The surrounding neighborhood was first occupied by German, Scottish, Italian, Armenian, and other European immigrants. According to old phone books, these residents were bookkeepers, waiters, clerks, ice deliverers, dressmakers, Kodak finishers, carpenters, carriage painters, streetcar linemen, and horseshoers, as well as conductors, switchmen, engineers, and brakemen for the nearby railroad. Many residents took the streetcar to work in downtown Austin. The earliest homes were built of longleaf pine from Calcasieu Parish, Louisiana—a lovely red hardwood, unfortunately logged to extinction. Today the streets are shaded by pecan and oak trees as old as the neighborhood, which thrive in the rich soil of the Colorado River floodplain. The river last flooded the area in the 1930s.

In the 1920s and 1930s, Mexican Americans began to move into the neighborhood as downtown growth displaced them eastward. These changes were exacerbated in the 1950s when Interstate 35 severed East Austin from downtown, creating a cultural and sociological barrier. Many Anglo residents moved out, not only due to "white flight" but also because the city failed to upgrade the utilities and other infrastructure. However, some descendants of the original owners still live in the Willow–Spence historic district. In the 1970s and 1980s, a few Anglos began returning, drawn by the historic homes. This trend continues, but a lively Mexican-American culture prevails.

== Future ==
In 1999, the Willow–Spence Streets Historic District was included in the East César Chávez Neighborhood Plan. The plan, written by neighborhood residents and business leaders, noted the goal of maintaining the historic and cultural character of the neighborhood. This plan and its design guidelines were adopted as part of the city's comprehensive plan.
