= Bertrand Gille =

Bertrand Gille may refer to:

- Bertrand Gille (historian) (1920–1980), French historian of technology
- Bertrand Gille (handballer) (born 1978), French Olympic handball player
