= J. P. Schneider Store =

- J.P. Schneider Store
- U.S. National Register of Historic Places
- Recorded Texas Historic Landmark
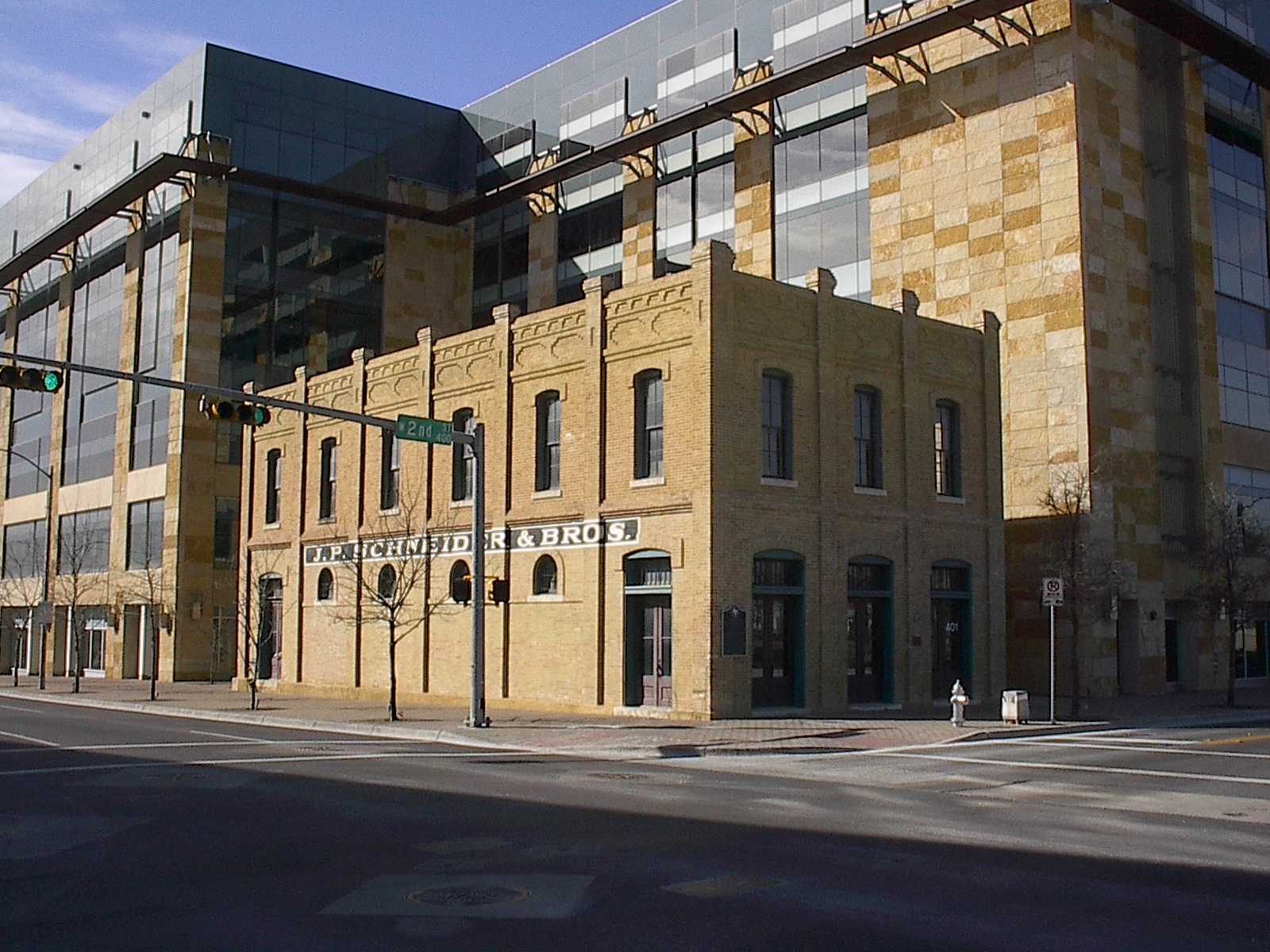
- Location: 401 W 2nd St; Austin, Texas, USA
- Coordinates: 30°15′54.54″N 97°44′52.52″W
- Built: 1873
- Architect: Jacob P. Schneider and John D. Schneider
- NRHP reference No.: 79003014
- RTHL No.: 6450

Significant dates
- Added to NRHP: January 29, 1979
- Designated RTHL: 1974

The J.P. Schneider Store is a historic commerce building in downtown Austin, Texas built in 1873. Built along Second Street, the structure is the only remaining historic building in the immediate vicinity and is today surrounded by Austin City Hall and the headquarters of Silicon Labs.

The building was added to the National Register of Historic Places in 1979. As of September 2023, Lamberts Downtown Barbeque is housed in the space.
