= Bertram Building =

- U.S. National Register of Historic Places
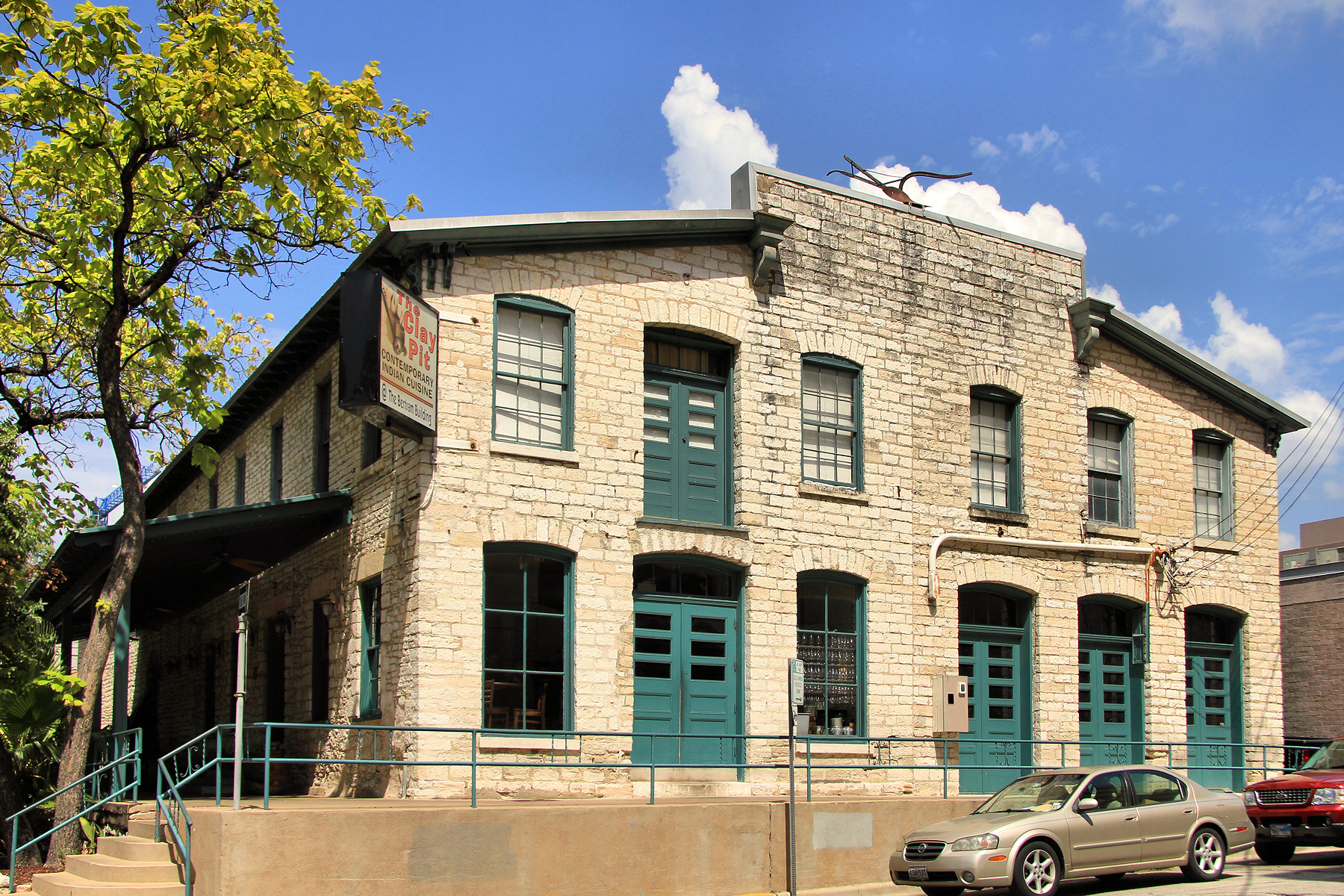
- Location: 1601 Guadalupe St., Austin, Texas
- Area: 0.2 acres (0.081 ha)
- Built: 1866
- Architectural style: Two-part Commercial Block
- NRHP reference No.: 12000590
- Added to NRHP: August 28, 2012

Bertram Building, also known as Bertram Store, is a historic building at 1601 Guadalupe Street in Austin, Texas.
