= Southern Walnut Creek Trail =

Cycleway in Austin, Texas

- Length: 7.3 miles (11.7 km)
- Location: Austin, Texas
- Trailheads: Govalle Park, Walnut Creek Sports Park
- Use: cycling, walking
- Website: https://www.austintexas.gov/department/southern-walnut-creek-trail

Trail map
- Map

Southern Walnut Creek Trail is a 7.3-mile (11.7 km), multi-use trail in eastern Austin, Texas that follows a portion of the route of Walnut Creek.

The trail is a 10-foot (3.0 m)-wide concrete path extends from Govalle Park to the Walnut Creek Sports Park at Johnny Morris Road and Daffan Lane and includes 5 bridges.

Constructed with $7.3 million from the U.S. Department of Transportation. Construction began in May 2012 with a grand opening in October 2018.

It connects multiple neighborhoods and centers including Govalle Park, the East Communities YMCA, Davis-White Northeast Neighborhood Park, Walnut Creek Greenbelt, The Austin Tennis Center at the Walnut Creek Sports Park, and phase I of the Austin to Manor trail system.

== See also ==
- Lists of Cycleways in Austin, Texas
