= Jamie Odom Pavilion =

Pavilion in Austin, Texas, U.S.

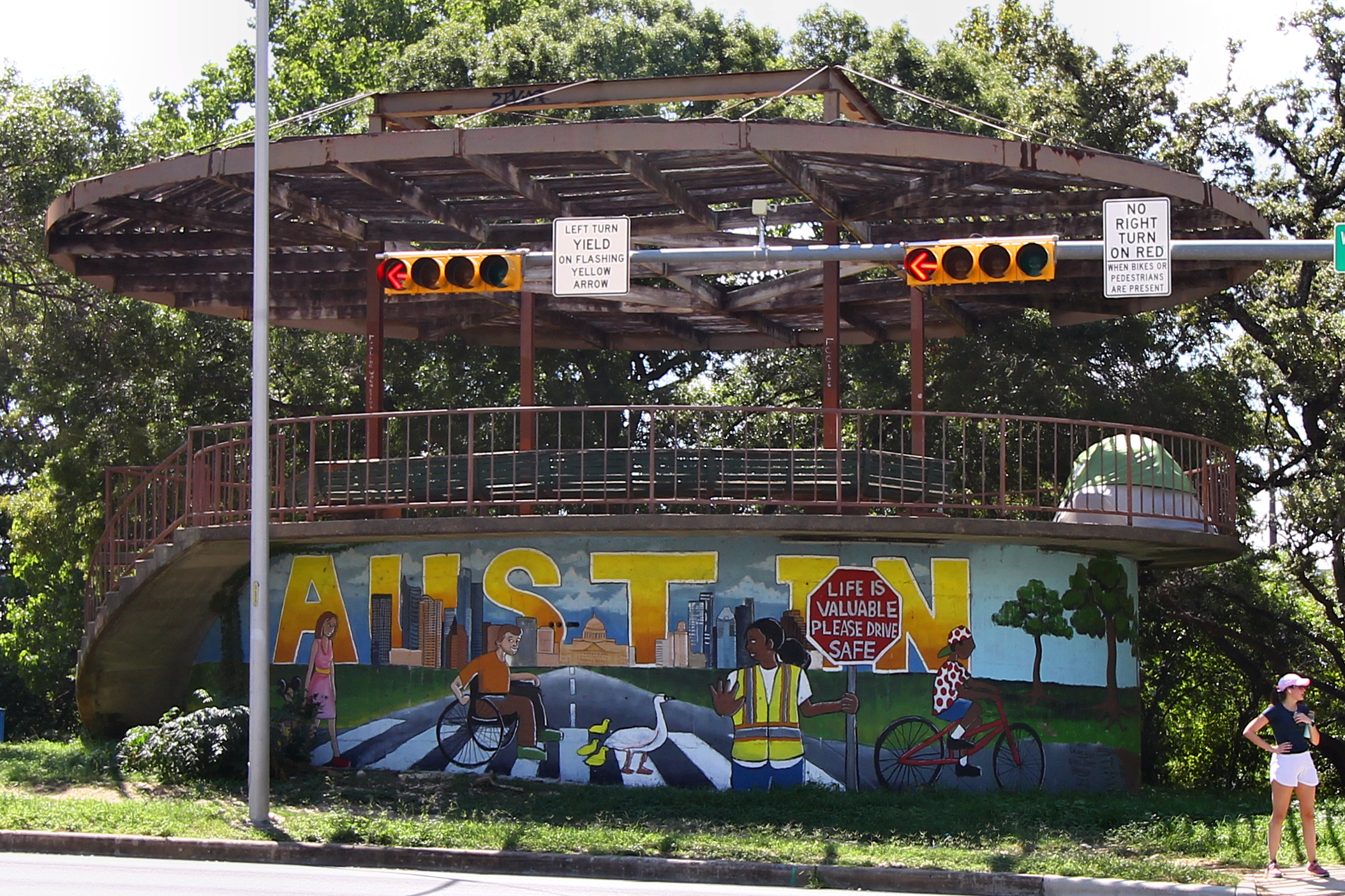
- Interactive map of the Jamie Odom Pavilion area

General information
- Location: Austin, Texas, United States
- Coordinates: 30°15′57″N 97°45′13″W

Jamie Odom Pavilion, or simply Odom Pavilion, is a memorial pavilion along Lady Bird Lake in Austin, Texas, United States. The platform has been described as Austin's "most underused city-owned property".
