= Green Water Treatment Plant =

Water treatment facility in Austin, Texas

Coordinates: 30°15′57″N 97°44′59″W

The Thomas C. Green Water Treatment Plant was Austin Water Utility's first water treatment plant, and the first to open in Austin, Texas. It closed in 2008 and was redeveloped into multiple skyscrapers by Trammel Crow Company.

== History ==
The Green Water Treatment Plant opened as the Austin Filtration Plant in 1924 on the north shore of the Colorado River in Downtown Austin, which is now part of Lady Bird Lake. The plant opened after the development of a chemical treatment for river water by Dr. E. P. Schoch of the University of Texas in 1923. It was the only water treatment plant in the Austin Water system until 1954, when the Albert R. Davis Water Treatment Plant opened on Lake Austin. From 1984 to 1986, the plant was modernized and its capacity was doubled while remaining in operation. As the Green Water Treatment Plant aged into the 2000s, then-Mayor Will Wynn proposed the relocation or closure of the plant along with the construction of Water Treatment Plant 4 in West Austin. In 2008, the plant was officially decommissioned by Austin City Council and city staff recommended developer Trammel Crow's proposal for redevelopment of the site.

== Redevelopment ==
In 2014, the City of Austin sold the Green Water parcel to Trammel Crow for $42.2 million. The site was redivided into its original blocks, as laid out in the Waller Plan of 1839; the full Blocks 1 & 185, and the southern portions of Blocks 23 and 188. Nueces Street was extended south through the site to connect to Cesar Chavez Street, and 2nd Street was extended west to Shoal Creek. 2nd Street would later be extended west to cross the creek and connect to the street grid of the Seaholm Power Plant redevelopment. The four blocks were developed into office and mixed-use towers by Trammel Crow between 2015 and 2022.

=== Block 1 (The Northshore) ===
Block 1 was the first of the Green Water sites to be redeveloped, with construction beginning in 2015. The plot was developed as The Northshore, a mixed-use building with office and retail space in its podium and an apartment tower stepping back from Lady Bird Lake, due to setback requirements. The tower opened in 2016 as Austin's tallest apartment building, which it remains to this day.

=== Block 23 (500 West 2nd Street) ===
500 West 2nd Street was the first office tower built on the Green Water site. Construction began in 2015 and concluded in 2017, with Google as the building's only office tenant. The building was commonly referred to as "The Google Building" before the opening of Block 185. The building was designed as a pre-certified LEED Gold tower.

=== Block 185 ===
Block 185 was the final Green Water site to be developed, with construction beginning in 2019 and completing in 2022. The tower was the second in Austin to be leased by Google, who occupies the entire building. The tower is the tallest of the Green Water skyscrapers and the tallest office building in Austin, reaching 594 feet (181 meters) tall. Block 185 has a unique design due to its setbacks on the southern and western facades, which face Lady Bird lake and Shoal Creek, respectively.

=== Block 188 (Austin Proper Hotel & Residences) ===
Austin Proper is a mixed-use hotel and condo tower facing Shoal Creek. The tower's design was first proposed in 2015, but it did not start construction until 2017. The building was completed in 2020. The tower contains the only hotel space in the Green Water redevelopment, the Austin Proper Hotel, which is a member of Marriott's Design Hotels.
