= Roberta Crenshaw =

American philanthropist (1914–2005)

- Born: Roberta Purvis; April 17, 1914; Little Rock, Arkansas, U.S.
- Died: February 8, 2005 (aged 90)
- Education: University of Texas at Austin College of Liberal Arts
- Occupations: Civic leader; philanthropist

Roberta P. Crenshaw (April 17, 1914 - February 8, 2005) was an American civic leader and philanthropist. Crenshaw campaigned for over 60 years to preserve park land in Austin, Texas and supported Austin-area cultural institutions.

== Early life and education ==
Roberta Purvis was born in Little Rock, Arkansas on April 17, 1914. She came to Austin, Texas in 1932 to attend the University of Texas. She graduated with a liberal arts degree and served the Zeta Tau Alpha sorority as president. She married cotton exporter and oilman Malcolm Hiram Reed, with whom she had two daughters. After his unexpected death in 1945, she married attorney Fagan Dickson, who she divorced in 1974. In 1975, she married lawyer Charles Edward Crenshaw, becoming stepmother to golfer Ben Crenshaw.

== Career ==
Crenshaw was appointed by Austin City Council to the Parks Board in 1952, which was at that time under the Public Works Department. Crenshaw helped push for the parks department to be joined with the recreation department, and in 1963, the Austin Parks and Recreation Department was officially formed. Crenshaw served 12 years on the Parks Board, serving as chair from 1964 to 1969. In 1954, Crenshaw donated six acres of land to create Reed Park in Tarrytown.

In the 1960s, as chair of the Parks Board, she spearheaded the effort to create parkland and a trail surrounding Town Lake. Crenshaw, who purchased nearly 400 shrubs and trees to spur development of parks along the lakefront, helped recruit Lady Bird Johnson to boost funding and support for the lake's beautification projects. Crenshaw also formed a coalition to prevent private developers to bring amusement parks to the lake.

Crenshaw, while married to Fagan Dickson, owned a cattle farm in the East Riverside area called "Faro Farm". In 1973, the couple partnered with developers to redevelop the property into a large planned unit development called "The Crossing". Much of the development was not fully realized, and in 1984, Crenshaw donated more than 30 acres (120,000 m^{2}) of the land to the City of Austin to create the Colorado River Park, later renamed Roy G. Guerrero Park.

In 1976, Crenshaw joined the board of a nonprofit group formed to save the Paramount Theatre, a building that she owned 50% of through a trust in her late husband's estate. Crenshaw donated her share to the nonprofit, who was able to secure funding to renovate the deteriorated theater.

Crenshaw raised funds to create the Umlauf Sculpture Garden and Museum, which opened in 1991. In the 1990s, Crenshaw fought to convince the Texas Department of Transportation to fund and construct a pedestrian walkway under the MoPac Expressway bridge across the Colorado River, which opened in 2004. Up until her death, Crenshaw fought a 20-year battle to prevent private development on the site of the Seaholm Power Plant, which was ultimately redeveloped.

Crenshaw was a founder and the first President of the Austin Ballet Society. She served as a trustee of the National Recreation and Park Association and was a member of the Heritage Society of Austin (now Preservation Austin), Austin History Center, Symphony Orchestra Society, Women's Symphony League, Laguna Gloria Art Museum, and the Texas Nature Conservancy. Crenshaw also served on the advisory board for the UT School of Architecture and was an honorary member of the Austin AIA chapter.

== Death and legacy ==
Roberta Crenshaw died on February 8, 2005, at her home in Austin, Texas. Her husband Charles Crenshaw and a daughter, Roberta, preceded her in death.

On July 18, 2004, the Austin City Council voted to designate the MoPac pedestrian bridge the "Roberta Crenshaw Pedestrian Walkway", which was dedicated on April 18, 2005. A plaque at the north entrance to the bridge notes her contributions to Austin's parks and culture.

In 2016, the Paramount Theatre installed a life-size portrait of Crenshaw painted by Wayman Elbridge Adams, which formerly hung in her home.
