= Austin Public Library =

Public library system serving Austin, Texas, United States

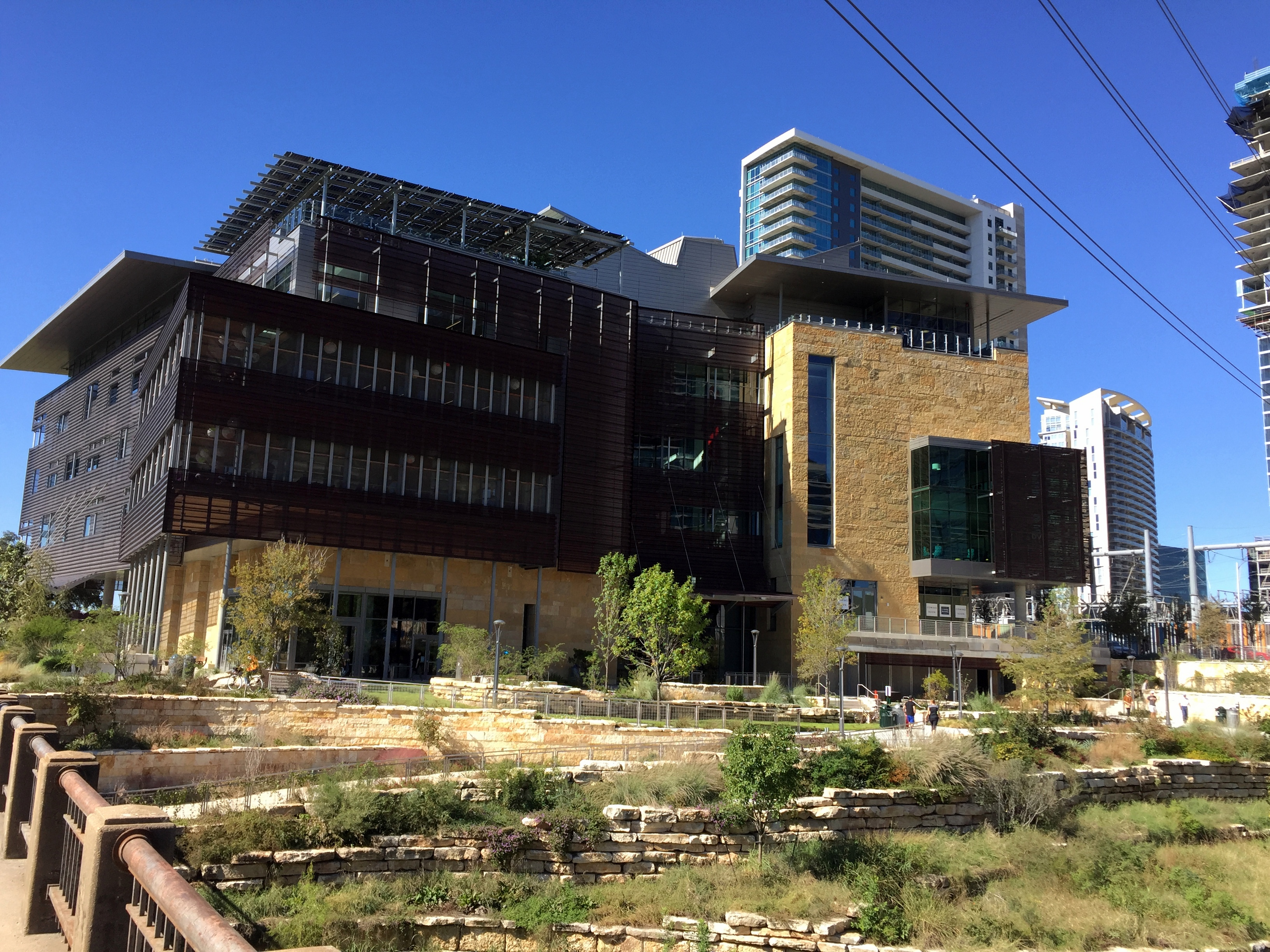
- Central Library viewed from the south
- 30°15′57″N 97°45′06″W
- Location: Austin, Texas
- Type: Library system
- Established: February 1926
- Branches: 20

Access and use
- Circulation: 7,730,000 items (FY 2025)
- Members: 333,328 Cardholders (FY 2025)

Other information
- Budget: $83,535,435 (FY 2027)
- Director: Hannah Terrell
- Employees: 451.55 (on an FTE basis) (FY 2027)
- Website: library.austintexas.gov

Austin Public Library is a public library system serving Austin, Texas, United States. It is operated by the City of Austin and consists of the Central Library on Cesar Chavez Street (which replaced the old Faulk Central Library in 2017), the Austin History Center, and 20 branches.

== History ==
On November 13, 1925, Grace Delano Clark persuaded the Austin Branch of the American Association of University Women (AAUW) to initiate a project to establish the Austin Public Library.

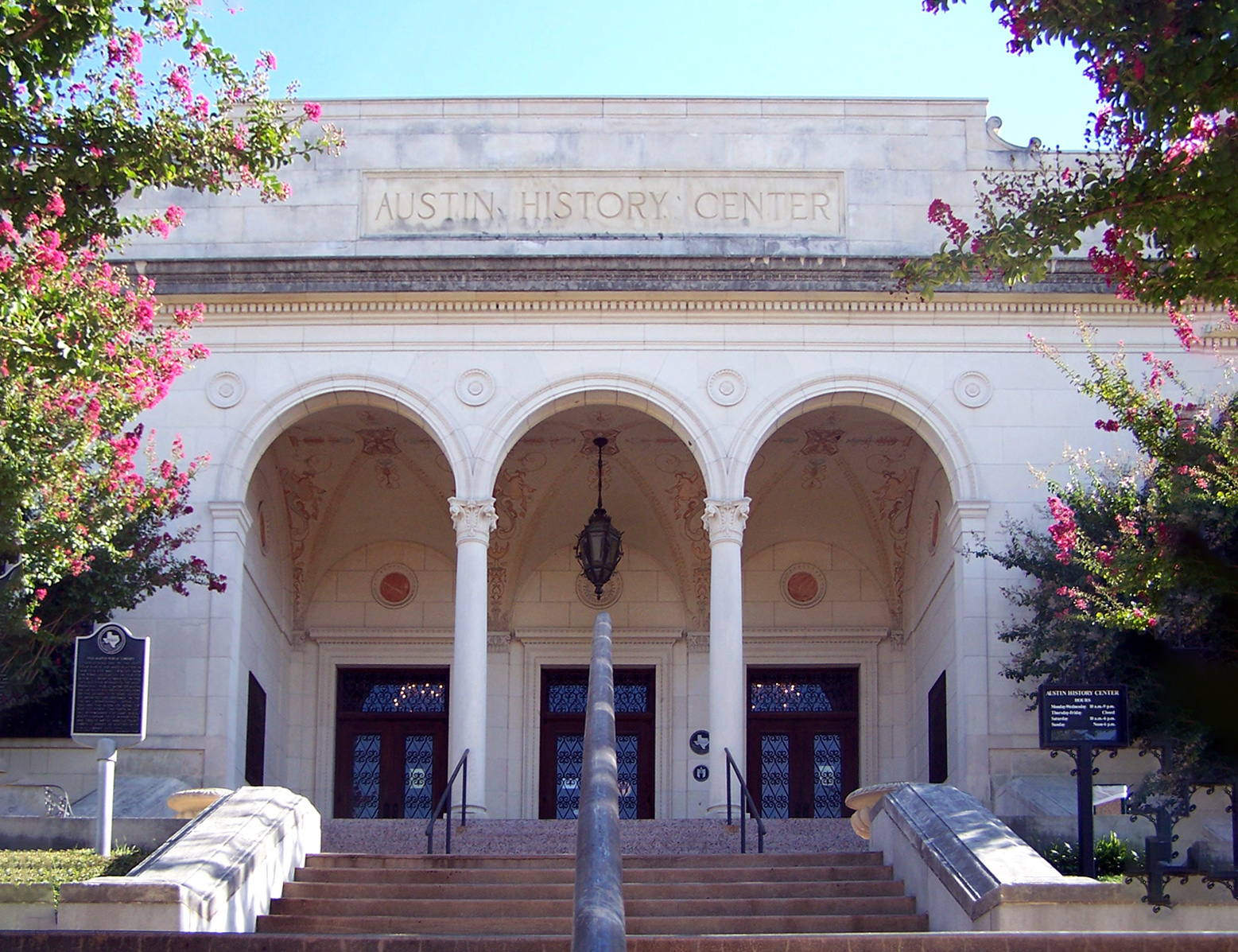
Austin History Center

AAUW organized a house-to-house campaign to solicit book donations and money for a dedicated building. On February 16, 1926, at 3:00 in the afternoon, the Austin Public Library opened at 819 Congress Avenue in a rented room above the office of newspaper Pressler & Ziller, and Mrs. W. A. Cocke served as the first librarian. The library held 500 donated volumes, and Grace Delano Clark served as Volunteer Librarian. In December of the same year, Austin's first library building, an 1,800 square feet (170 m^{2}) wood-frame structure, opened at West 9th and Guadalupe Streets.

In 1928, Austin voters approved $150,000 in bonds for a permanent building, and the temporary building was moved to Angelina Street, resurfaced with brick, and opened as the library's first branch, the George Washington Carver Branch. The building is now part of the George Washington Carver Museum, adjacent to the current Carver Branch.

From 1933 until 1951 library services were provided on a racially segregated basis. The small George Washington Carver branch was designated as the facility to serve Blacks. They were not welcome at any other library facility, although they could request library materials to be sent to Carver. William Astor Kirk, a professor at Huston–Tillotson University, challenged this arrangement. By the end of 1951 the segregation policy was ended.

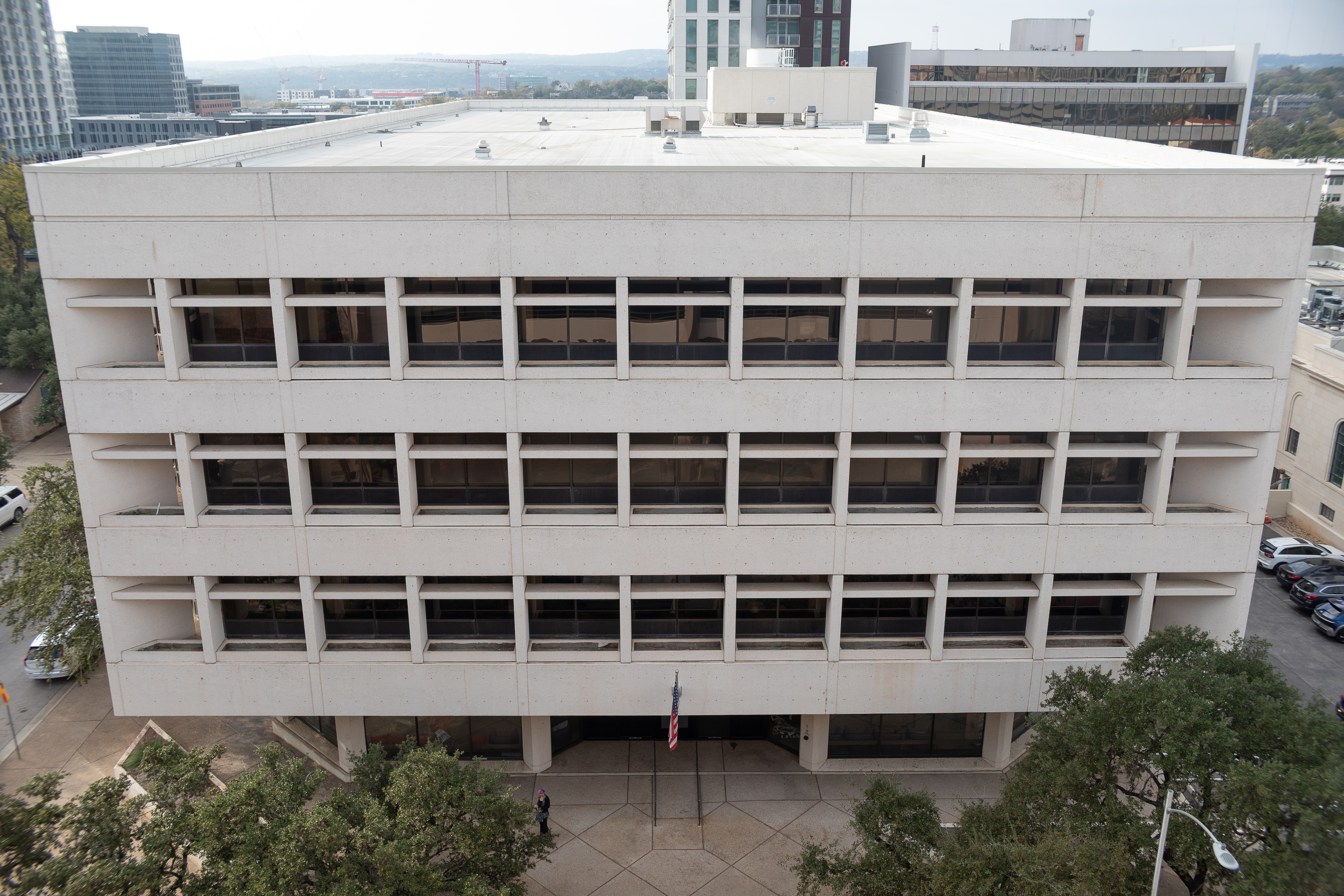
Faulk Central Library

The new, permanent building was to be designed by Austin architect Hugo Kuehne, and construction began in 1932. The building took advantage of local materials and craftsmen. Texas "Cordova" cream limestone was selected to achieve the Italian Renaissance Revival style of the building. Ornamental wrought iron work was created by Fortunat Weigl to enhance the balconies, doors and windows. Peter Mansbendel, a Swiss master woodcarver who immigrated to Texas in 1911, carved much of the interior woodwork. Bubi Jessen and Peter Alidi painted the tracery frescoes on the ceiling of the arched loggia on the north side of the building.

In March 1933, the new building opened at West 9th and Guadalupe. This building served as the main library from 1933 until 1979, when construction of the John Henry Faulk Central Library next door was complete. At that time, the newly formed Austin History Center Association consolidated community support to renovate the old central library building to house the expanding Austin-Travis County Collection. In 1983, the Austin-Travis County Collection formally became the Austin History Center.

In 2009, the library opened Recycled Reads, a used bookstore in Northwest Austin, as part of the city's zero waste initiatives. The store sold materials weeded from the library, as well as donations from community members with funds supporting the library system. The store closed in January 2026 due to city budget pressures, with donations and used library books to be sold at individual branches instead of a central location. The library noted that the costs to operate the bookstore, including its lease and operations, resulted in over $400,000 in losses annually.

The library began offering a variant of library cards with photo ID in 2023. While traditional cards are still offered, the "enhanced" library card's photo ID would be accepted by select City of Austin departments and community agencies as a valid form of identification.

== Central Library ==
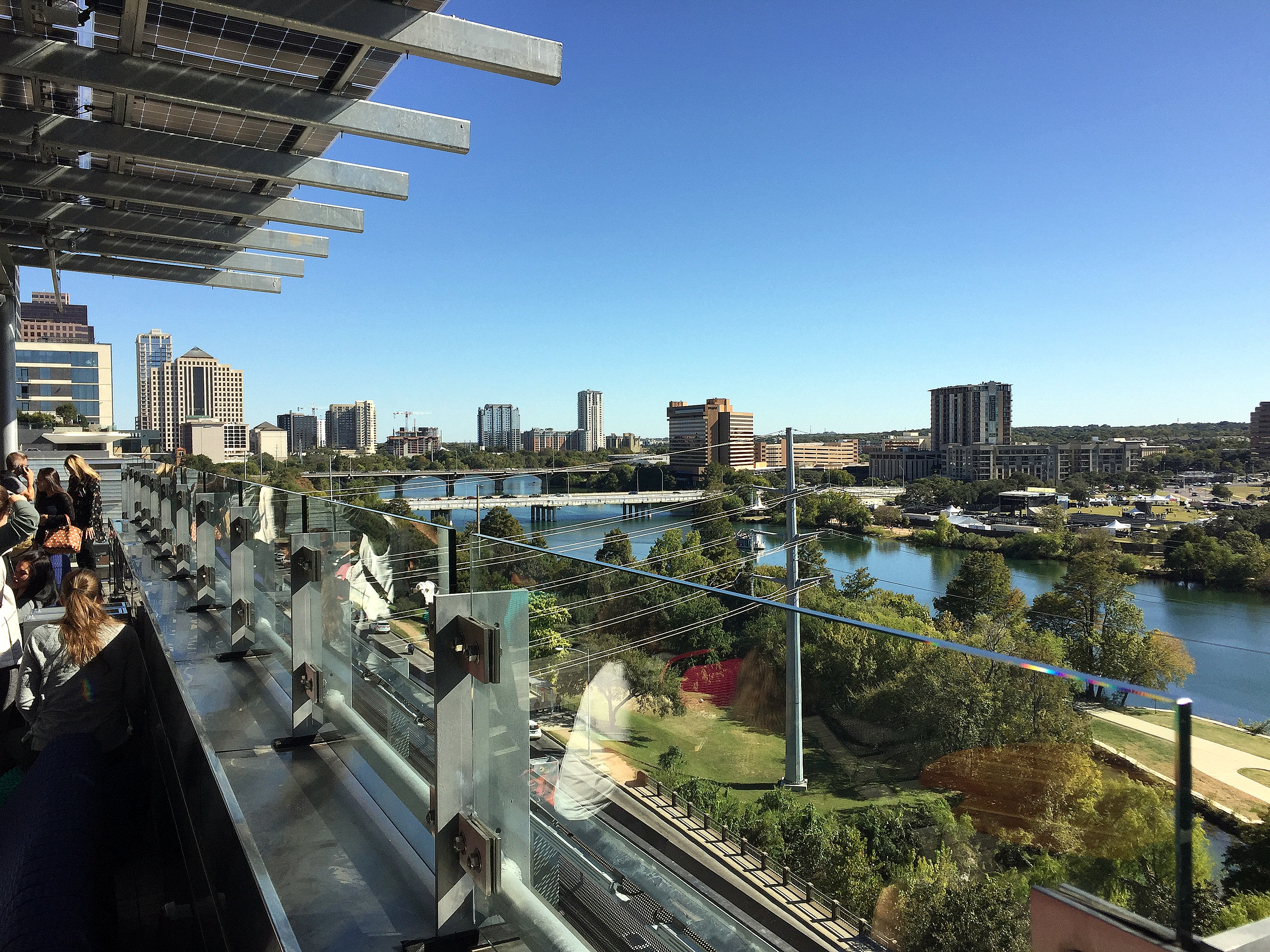
View from Central Library rooftop garden.

In 1972, Austin voters passed a $6 million bond for a new central library to be built on an adjacent site at West 8th and Guadalupe. Jessen Associates, founded by Bubi Jessen and Wolf Juessen, designed this central library in the New Formalist style under the direction of architect Fred Day. Construction began in 1976, and the building opened to the public on April 11, 1979. John Henry Faulk, a local writer and free speech advocate who would be the building's namesake, was the keynote speaker at the dedication ceremony on August 26, 1979.

The Faulk Central Library was 110,000 square feet (10,000 m^{2}) on five stories (the first three open to the public, with the fourth floor reserved for the administrative offices, and the basement reserved for storage/utilities).

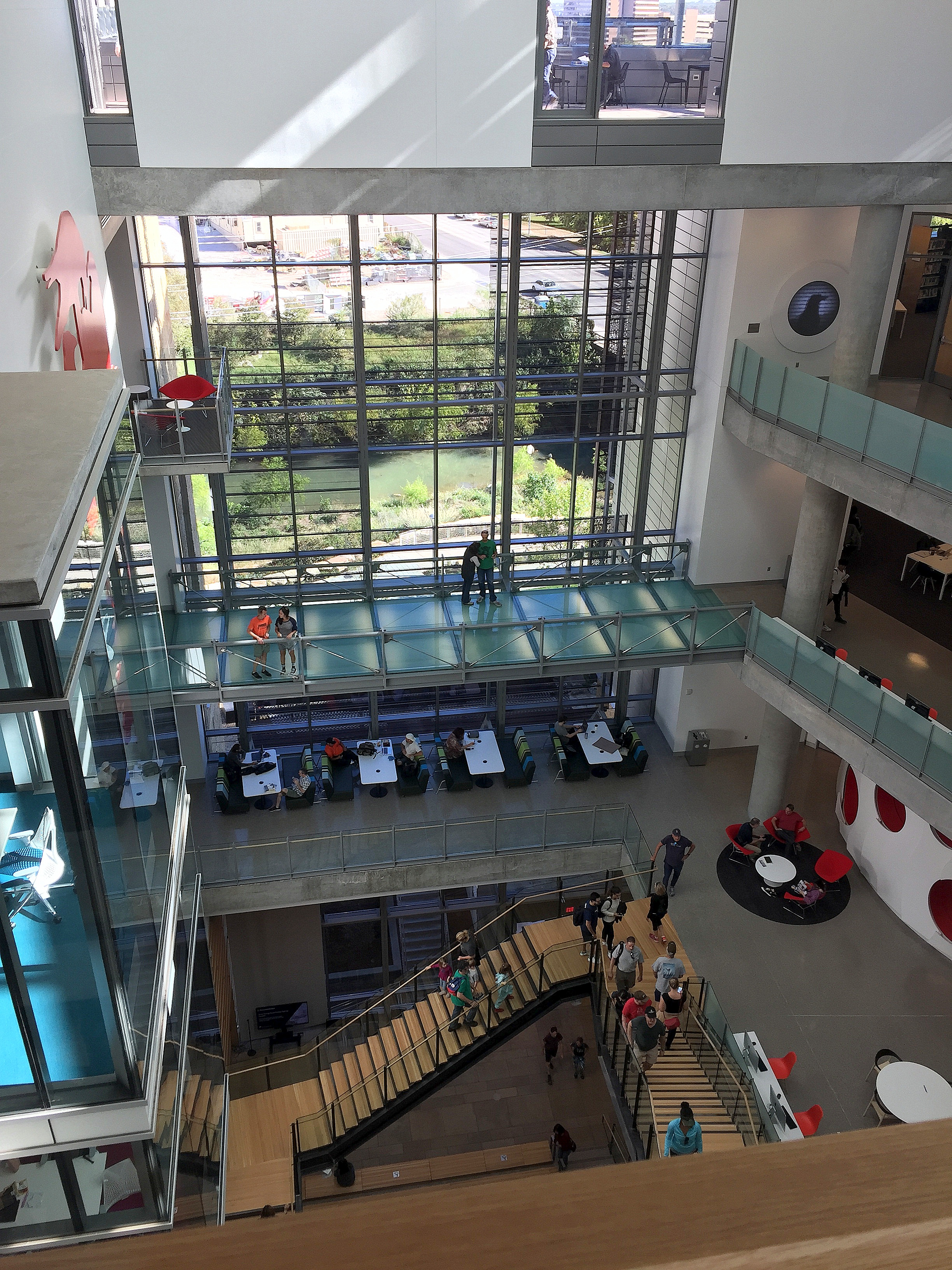
The new central library (opened on October 28th 2017), showing the interior from the 6th floor.

In May 2013, the City of Austin broke ground on a 6-story central library overlooking Shoal Creek and Lady Bird Lake, funded in large part by a bond program approved by Austin voters in 2006, to replace the Faulk Central Library. The building is part of the city's extensive redevelopment of the former Seaholm Power Plant site, east of the intersection of Lamar Boulevard and Cesar Chavez Street. It opened to the public on Saturday October 28, 2017. The building was designed by a joint venture of San Antonio-based Lake Flato Architects and Boston-based Shepley Bulfinch. The new central library offers a living rooftop garden, reading porches, an indoor reading room and a bicycle corral, large indoor and outdoor event spaces, a gift shop, an art gallery and a café.

The design was awarded the American Institute of Architects' COTE Top Ten Award in 2020, for which winners are recognized for setting the standard in sustainable design excellence. The library was honored for its use of features such as the reduction of water use through rainwater harvesting, an in-ground cistern, and the building's vegetated roof; and a photovoltaic cell that generates 13% of the building's power and shades the rooftop garden. The library uses 40% less energy than a building of comparable size.

The Austin Central Library was one of six recipients of the 2018 AIA/ALA Library Building Awards.

In 2026, the library was featured in TIME Magazine's article, "A Portrait of America in 25 Buildings and Monuments."

== Branch Libraries ==
In addition to the Central Library and the Austin History Center, the Austin Public Library has 20 branch locations. The APL library system also has mobile libraries, including bookmobile buses and a human-powered trike and trailer named "Unbound: Sin Fronteras".

- Carver Branch
- Cepeda Branch
- Hampton Branch at Oak Hill
- Howson Branch
- John Gillum Branch (formerly North Village Branch)
- Little Walnut Creek Branch
- Manchaca Road Branch
- Milwood Branch
- Old Quarry Branch
- Pleasant Hill Branch
- Ruiz Branch
- St. John Branch
- Southeast Austin Community Branch
- Spicewood Springs Branch
- Henry Terrazas Branch
- Twin Oaks Branch
- University Hills Branch
- Willie Mae Kirk Branch (formerly Oak Springs Branch)
- Windsor Park Branch
- Yarborough Branch
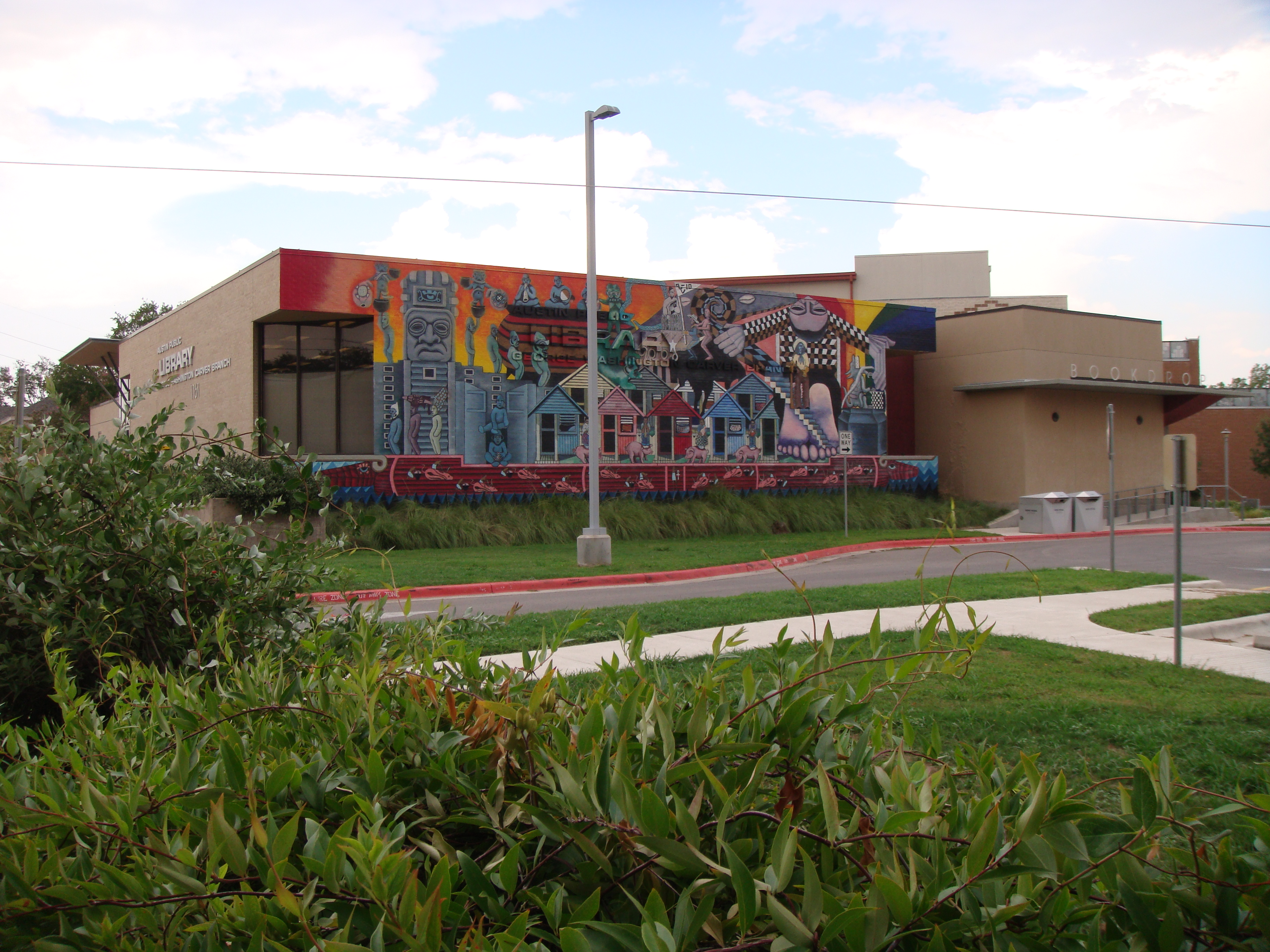
Carver Branch

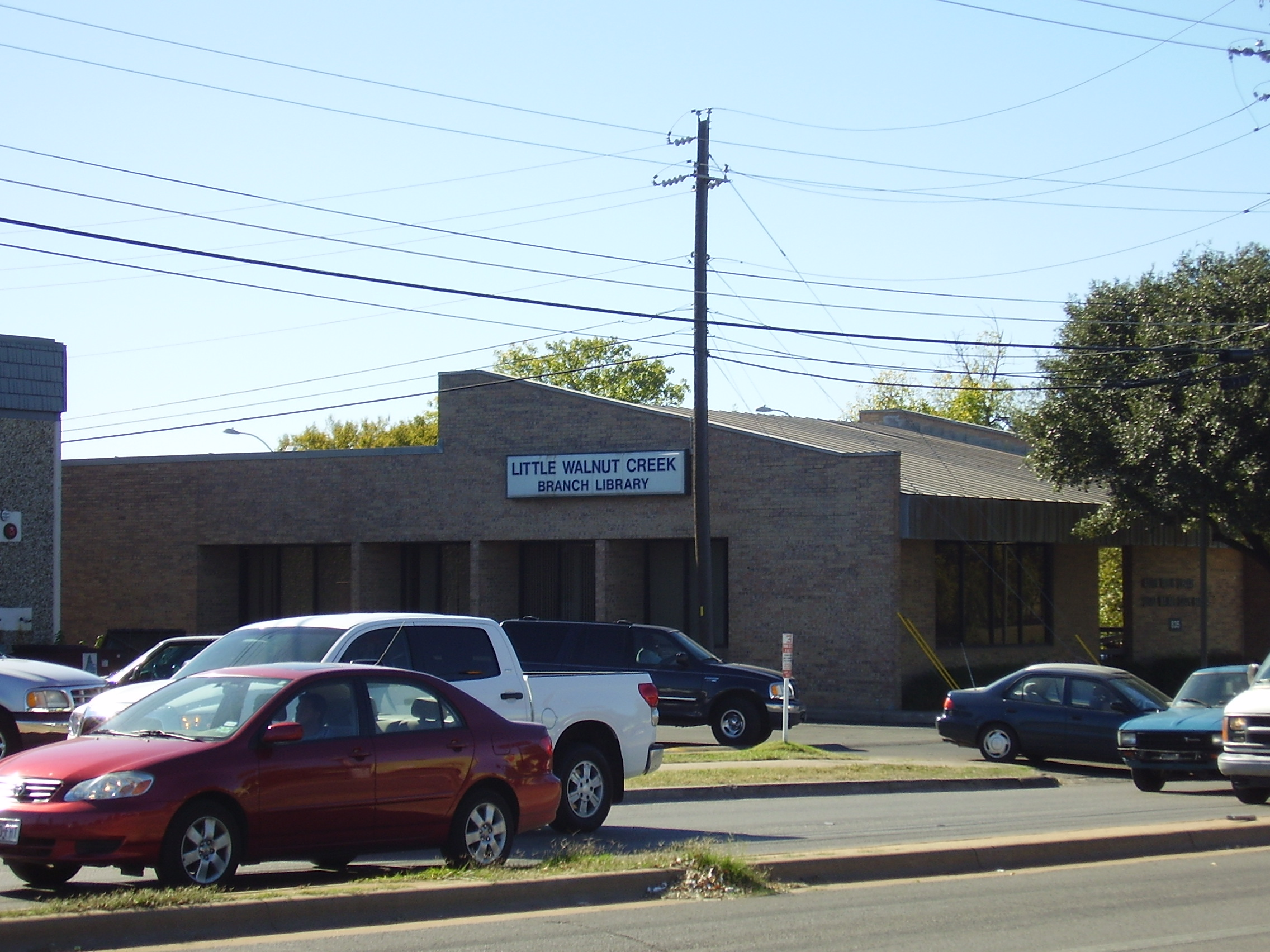
Little Walnut Creek Branch

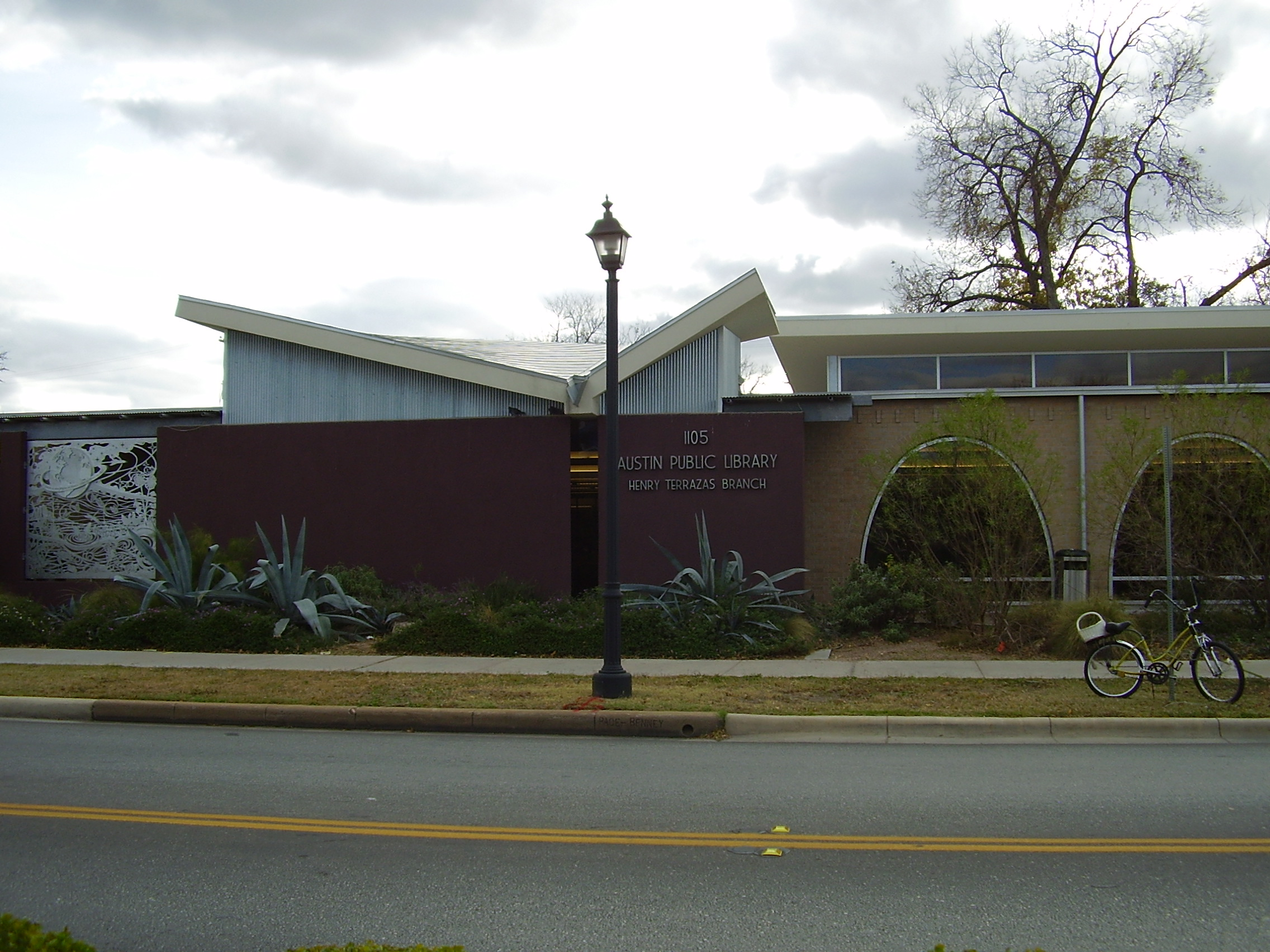
Terrazas Branch

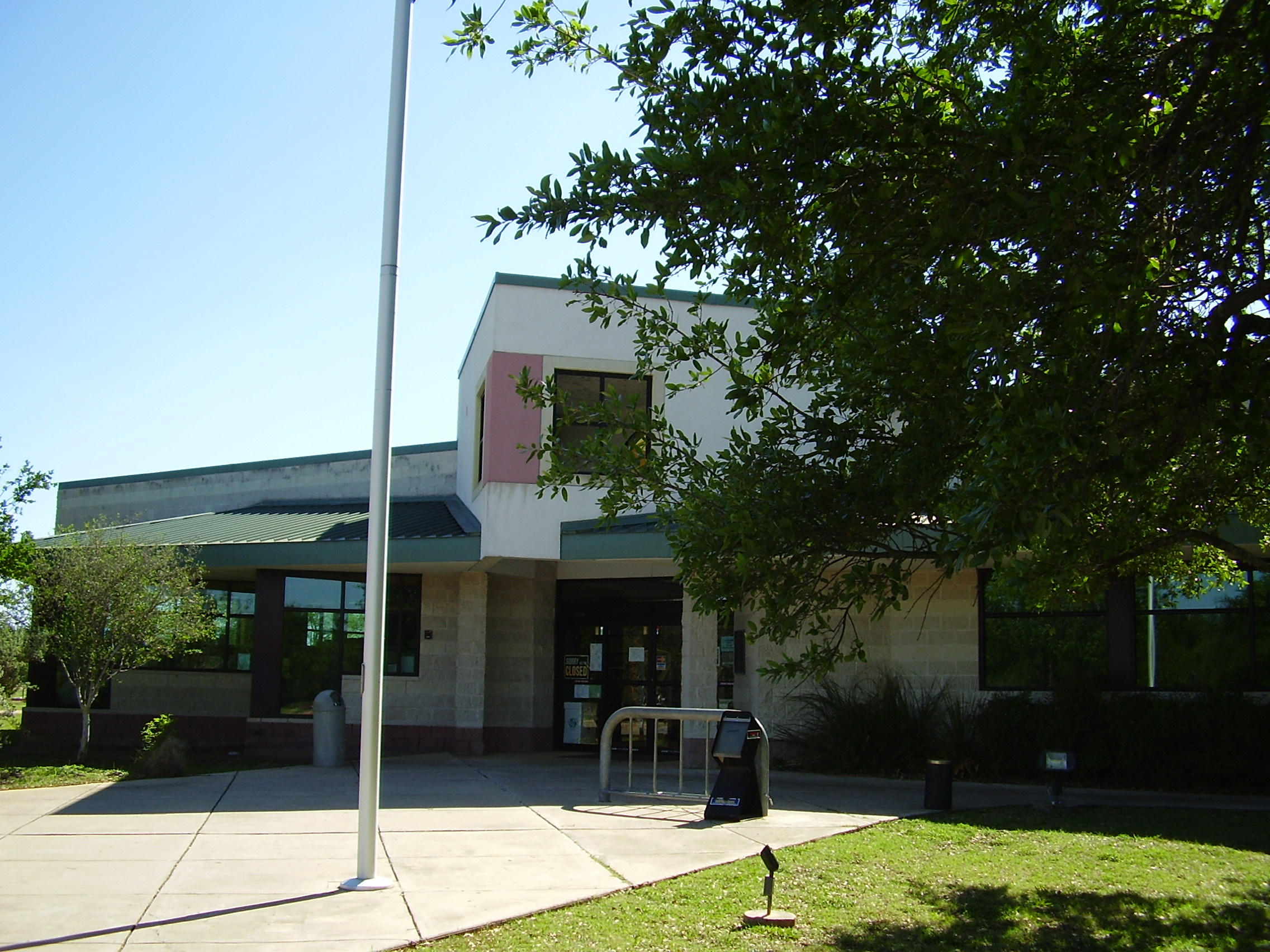
Hampton Branch at Oak Hill

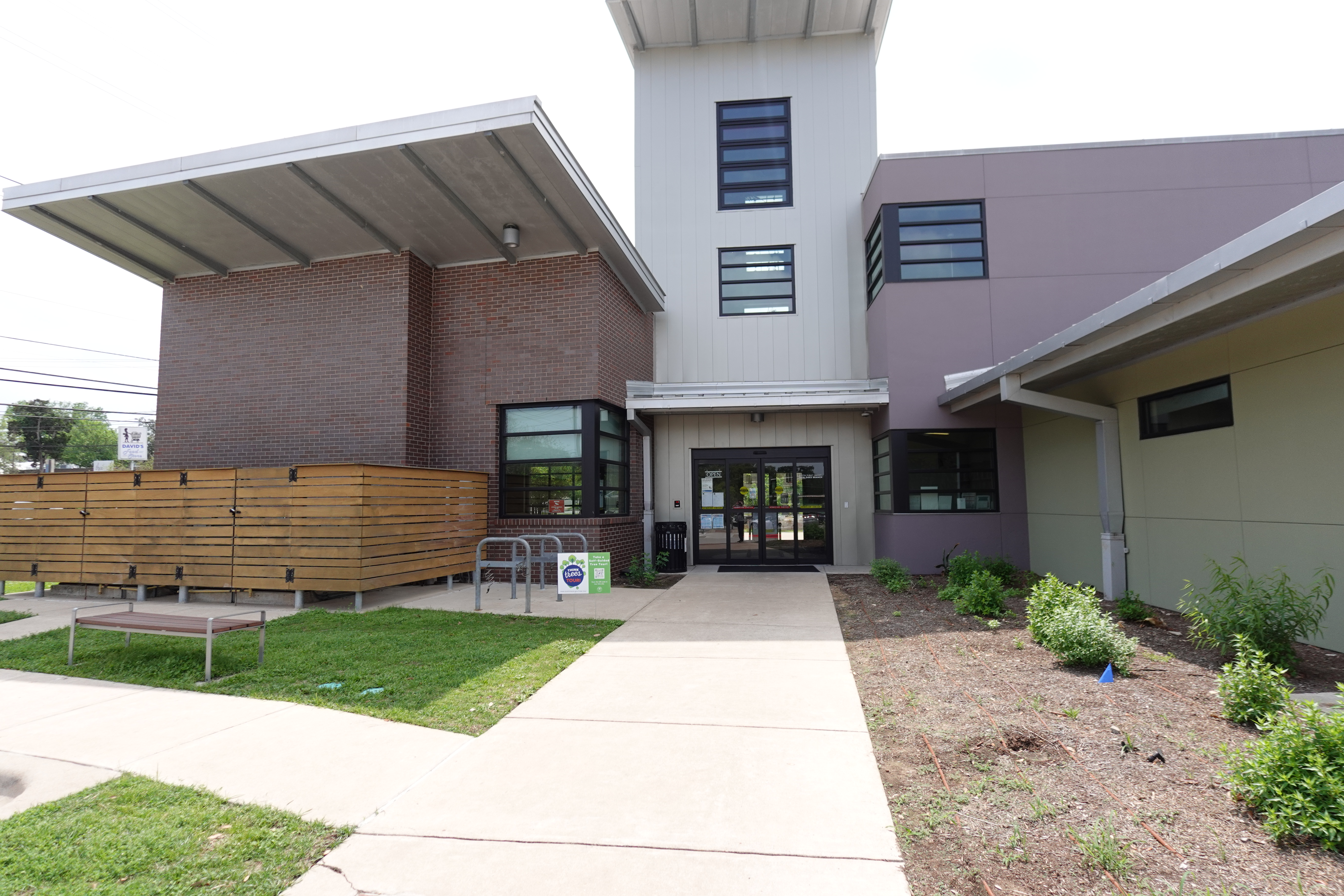
Twin Oaks Branch
