= Austin to Manor Trail =

- Length: 5.5 mi (8.9 km)
- Location: Austin, Texas, U.S.
- Trailheads: Daffan Lane (Austin) – Ben E. Fisher Park (Manor)
- Use: Cycling, walking, running, inline skating, wheelchair accessible
- Difficulty: Easy
- Surface: Concrete
- Maintained by: City of Austin

Trail map
- Map

The Austin to Manor Trail is a multi-use cycling and pedestrian trail in Travis County, Texas, United States. Spanning approximately 5.5 miles (8.9 km), the trail provides a continuous off-road connection between northeastern Austin and the suburb of Manor and follows the proposed Capital Metro Green Line, linking to the larger Southern Walnut Creek Trail system.

== History ==
The trail was conceived as part of the City of Austin's 2014 Urban Trails Plan, intended to expand the city's active transportation network and improve regional connectivity.

Construction progressed in two phases:

- Section 1 (Daffan Lane to Lindell Lane): A 2.5 miles (4.0 km) concrete path that opened in 2014, connecting to the Southern Walnut Creek Trail and traversing the Decker Tallgrass Prairie Preserve.
- Section 2 (Lindell Lane to Ben E. Fisher Park in Manor): A 2.9 miles (4.7 km) addition, completed in 2024.

Funding sources included the 2012, 2016, and 2020 City of Austin Mobility Bonds, a CAMPO (Capital Area Metropolitan Planning Organization) grant, and a Travis County interlocal agreement. The official ribbon-cutting ceremony for the completed trail was held at Ben E. Fisher Park in August 2024.

== Route ==
The trail begins near Daffan Lane in eastern Austin, meeting the Southern Walnut Creek Trail, and travels northeast through the Decker Tallgrass Prairie Preserve. It proceeds along or near Decker Lane, passes by Walter E. Long Park, and eventually parallels a Capital Metro freight rail corridor. The trail terminates at Ben E. Fisher Park in Manor.

The concrete path is 10–12 feet wide, mostly flat, and suitable for bicycles, pedestrians, and wheelchairs. Portions operate as a rail-with-trail adjacent to active tracks.

== Significance ==
The trail addresses growing transportation needs between Austin and Manor, offering a safe and car-free alternative to travel along Decker Lane. It connects suburban residents to Austin's wider urban trail system and is intended to complement the long-planned Capital Metro Green Line commuter rail corridor.

== See also ==
- Southern Walnut Creek Trail
- List of cycleways in Austin, Texas
