= List of cycleways in Austin, Texas =

List of urban trails and bicycle infrastructure in Austin, TX

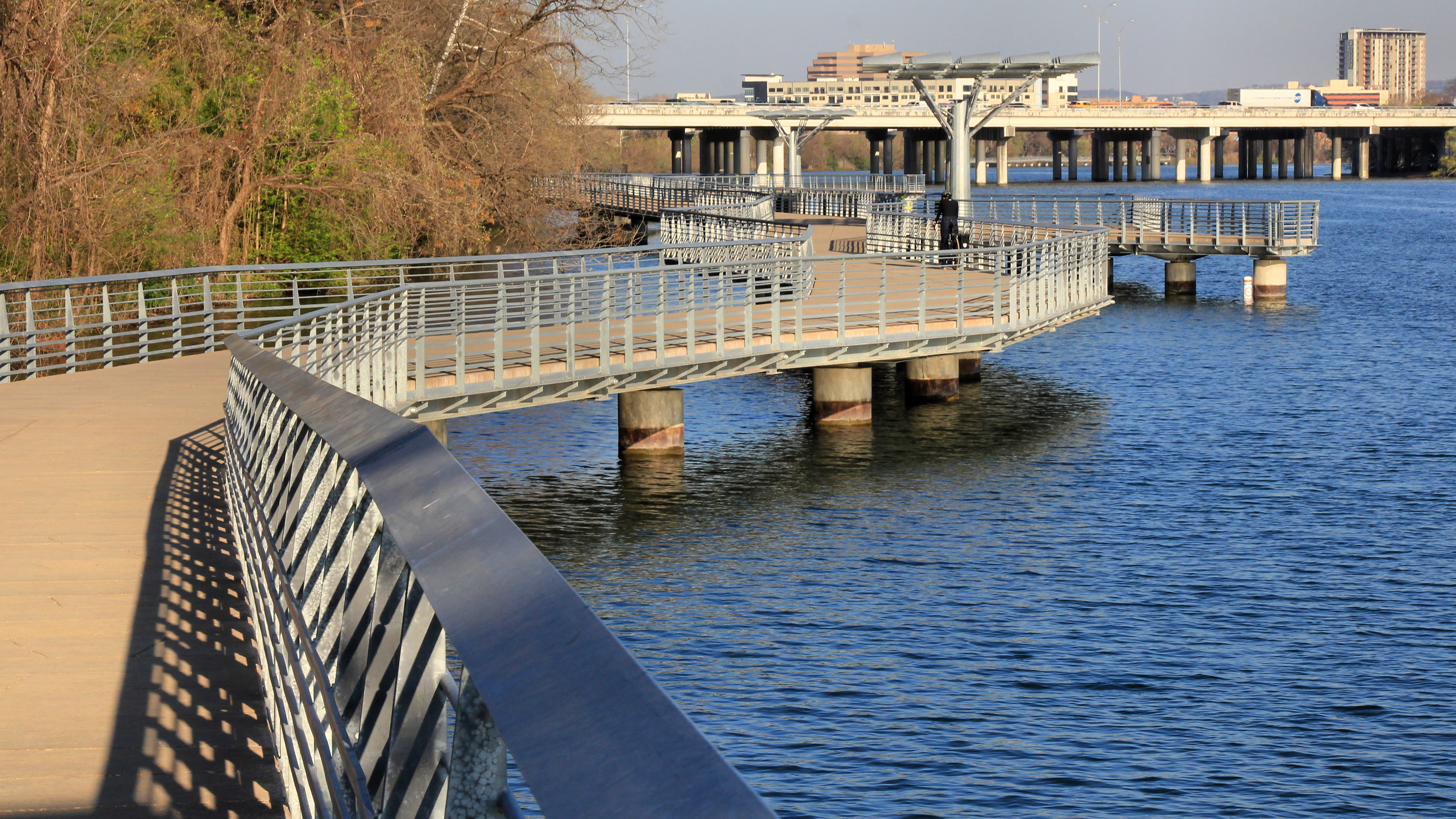
Butler Hike and Bike Trail Boardwalk on South Side of Lady Bird Lake, Austin, Texas.

The city of Austin, Texas, has developed a network of Cycleways, including bike lanes, shared-use paths, and dedicated urban trails. With its growing population, Austin has actively expanded its cycling infrastructure to promote alternative transportation and reduce vehicular congestion.

== History ==
Austin’s efforts to enhance cycling infrastructure began in the late 20th century, with early bike lanes introduced as part of the city’s commitment to multimodal transportation. In 1994 the City Council created a Bicycle Program in the Department of Transportation and Public Works. The first Austin Bicycle Plan was passed in 1996 (Part I) and 1997 (Part II).

In 2009 the plan added 400 miles (640 km) of lanes bringing the proposed total to 900 miles (1,400 km). The 2014 update to the plan marked a significant shift toward expanding dedicated cycleways across the city, aiming to create a safe and connected network for cyclists of all ages and skill levels. The 2023 plan dramatically increased the netwark with an estimated cost of $1.15 billion.

== Bicycle infrastructure and policies ==
In 2009 Austin earned gold status as a Bicycle Friendly Community. In 2024, Austin was ranked number 750 out of 2579 cities (71st percentile) by People for Bikes

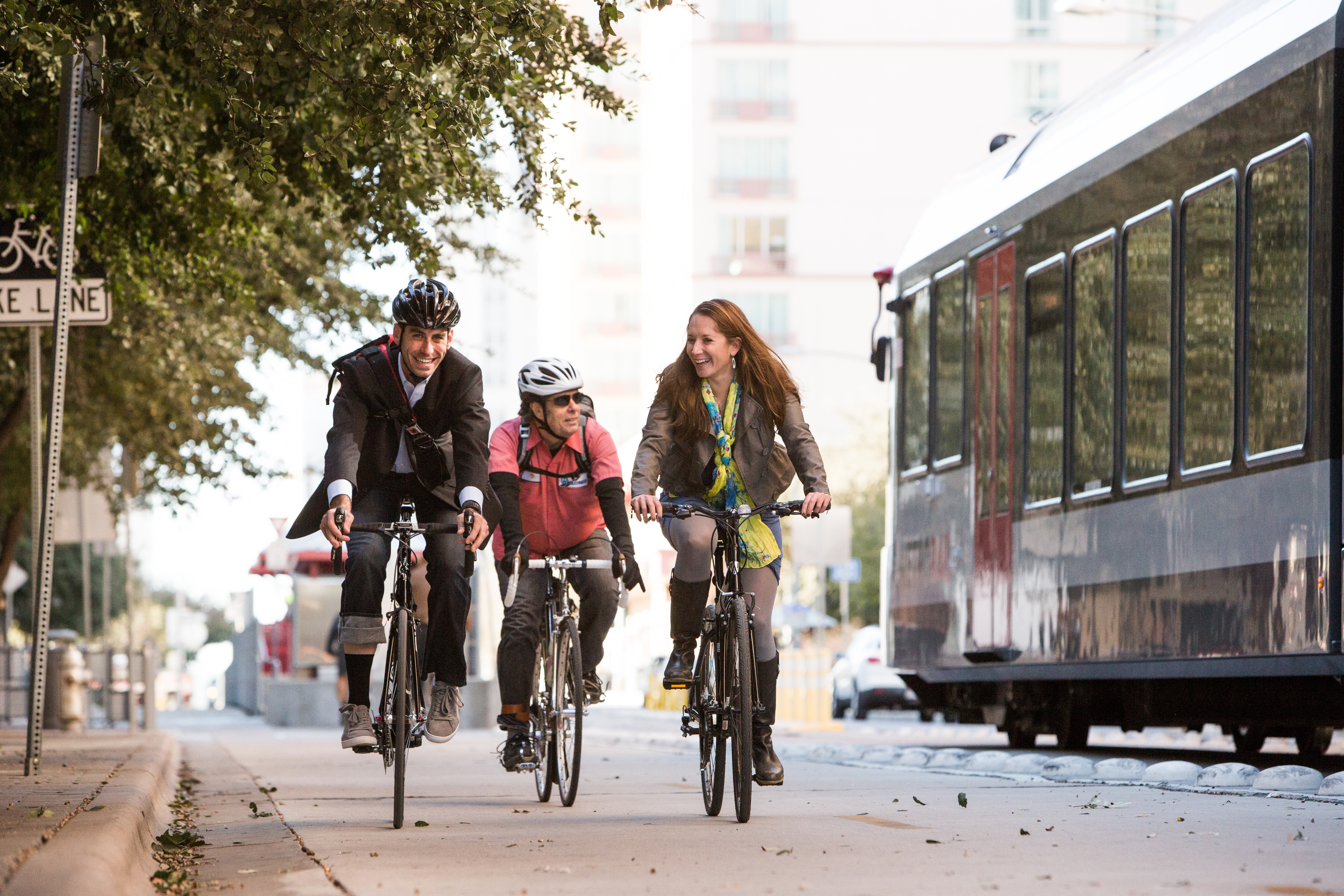
Bump-protected bike lane with bus 4th Street, Austin

Austin continues to expand its cycleway network through the city’s Active Transportation and Street Design Division. Infrastructure developments include:

- Protected bike lanes with physical barriers to separate cyclists from vehicular traffic.
- Neighborhood bikeways featuring traffic-calming measures to enhance safety.
- Bike parking facilities and repair stations across the city.
- Bike-friendly public transit options, including bike racks on Capital Metro buses and designated bike areas on commuter trains.

== Cycleways ==
The cycleways included in this list are drawn from the City of Austin, Texas Urban Trails Program.

The 2023 Urban Trails Plan identified: 68 miles of existing trails.

Austin Cycleways
Cycleway	Image	Length	Status	Construction	Route
Austin to Manor Trail	none	5.5 miles (8.9 km)	Complete	concrete path, 10–12 feet (3.0–3.7 m) wide	Starts near Daffan Lane and ends near Ben E. Fisher Park in Manor, Texas. Connects to Southern Walnut Creek Trail and follows the proposed Capital Metro green line.
Bergstrom Spur	none	5.5 miles (8.9 km)	Under Construction (est. Summer 2027)	8 – 13 foot-wide concrete path.	Connects Vinson Drive in south Austin to East Riverside Drive and US-183 in southeast Austin.
Blunn Creek Trail	none	1.4 miles (2.3 km)	Proposed	Soil, Concrete	From Woodward St to E Oltorf St along Blunn Creek
Chesterfield Ave Connector	none	1.44 miles (2.32 km)	Proposed	Undecided	Runs along Waller Creek from Denson Dr to Avenue D.
Colorado River Trail	none	Over 20 miles (32 km)	Proposed	Concrete	Runs along both sides of Colorado River from Longhorn Dam to 130.
Country Club Creek Trail	none	3.5 miles (5.6 km)	Partially Complete	12-foot-wide, off-street concrete path with grassy, tree-shaded shoulders	From Mabel Davis Park to Roy G. Guerrero Metro Park on the south-east side of Lady Bird Lake.
Eastlink	none	5.1 miles (8.2 km)	Partially Complete	Mix of concrete shared-use path, protected bike lanes along urban streets and crushed granite thru parks.	Connects Bartholomew Park to the north-east shore of Lady Bird Lake
Butler Hike-and-Bike Trail		10.1 miles (16.3 km)	Complete	Mostly crushed granite. A few lengths of concrete and a boardwalk on the South-side of the lake	A loop around Lady Bird Lake in Downtown Austin, TX, from the pedestrian bridge under MoPac expressway to the Longhorn damn.
Howard Ln Trail		2.4 miles (3.9 km)	Complete	Concrete Shared Use Path along Arterial Street	IH 35 To Dessau Rd
Johnson Creek Trail		1.1 miles (1.8 km)	Complete	Concrete path	From north-east shore of Lady Bird Lake to Enfield Road.
LAB		6 miles (9.7 km)	Complete	Combination of 10 foot concrete path and protected bike lanes.	From Austin High to the Montopolis Bridge
Little Walnut Creek Trail	none	Northern Section: 7.22 miles (11.62 km) Southern Section: 1.66 miles (2.67 km)	Proposed	Undecided	Northern Section: From North Austin YMCA on Rundberg to just south os US 290. Southern Section: From Manor Rd to E. 51st St along Little Walnut Creek
MoKan Trail		1.5 miles (2.4 km)	Partially Complete (est. completion - Fall 2026)	Concrete Path	Connects Red Line Parkway/Eastlink Trail to the Southern Walnut Creek Trail system
Montopolis Tributary Trail	none	1.57 miles (2.53 km)	Proposed	Concrete Path	From Riverside Dr to Felix Ave.
Mueller Trail		4 miles (6.4 km)	Complete	Mix of concrete path and crushed granite.	Loop around the Mueller Development
Onion Creek Trail	none	Nearly 20 miles (32 km)	Proposed	Undecided	From E. William Cannon Dr to Colorado River along Onion Creek
Red Line Parkway		32 miles (51 km)	15% Complete	Mix of concrete shared-use path, protected bike lanes along urban streets and crushed granite thru parks.	Follows CapMetro’s Red Line Rail from Downtown Austin to Leander
St Johns Ave to Red Line Trail	none	.45 miles (0.72 km)	Propoesed	Undecided	Follows Waller Creek from St. Johns to Airport.
Shoal Creek Trail	none	3.7 miles (6.0 km)	Complete	Mix of concrete path and crushed granite.	Along the creek from north shore of Lady Bird Lake in Downtown, through Pease Park, and on to West 38th Street becomes a bike lane along Shoal Creek Blvd.
Southern Walnut Creek Trail	none	7.3 miles (11.7 km)	Complete	10-foot (3.0 m)-wide concrete path	Govalle Park to the Walnut Creek Sports Park at Johnny Morris Road and Daffan Lane. Connects to Austin to Manor Trail
Waterloo Greenway		1.5 miles (2.4 km)	Under Construction	Concrete Path and Boardwalk	From Lady Bird Lake to 15th St along Waller Creek. Eventually extending to the Whitaker Sports Complex.
YBC Trail	none	5.26 miles (8.47 km)	Proposed		Connects the west side of the MoPac Mobility Bridges and the Austin Community College Pinnacle Campus
