= Boardwalk at Lady Bird Lake =

Boardwalk in Austin, Texas, U.S.

Coordinates: 30°14′54″N 97°43′55″W

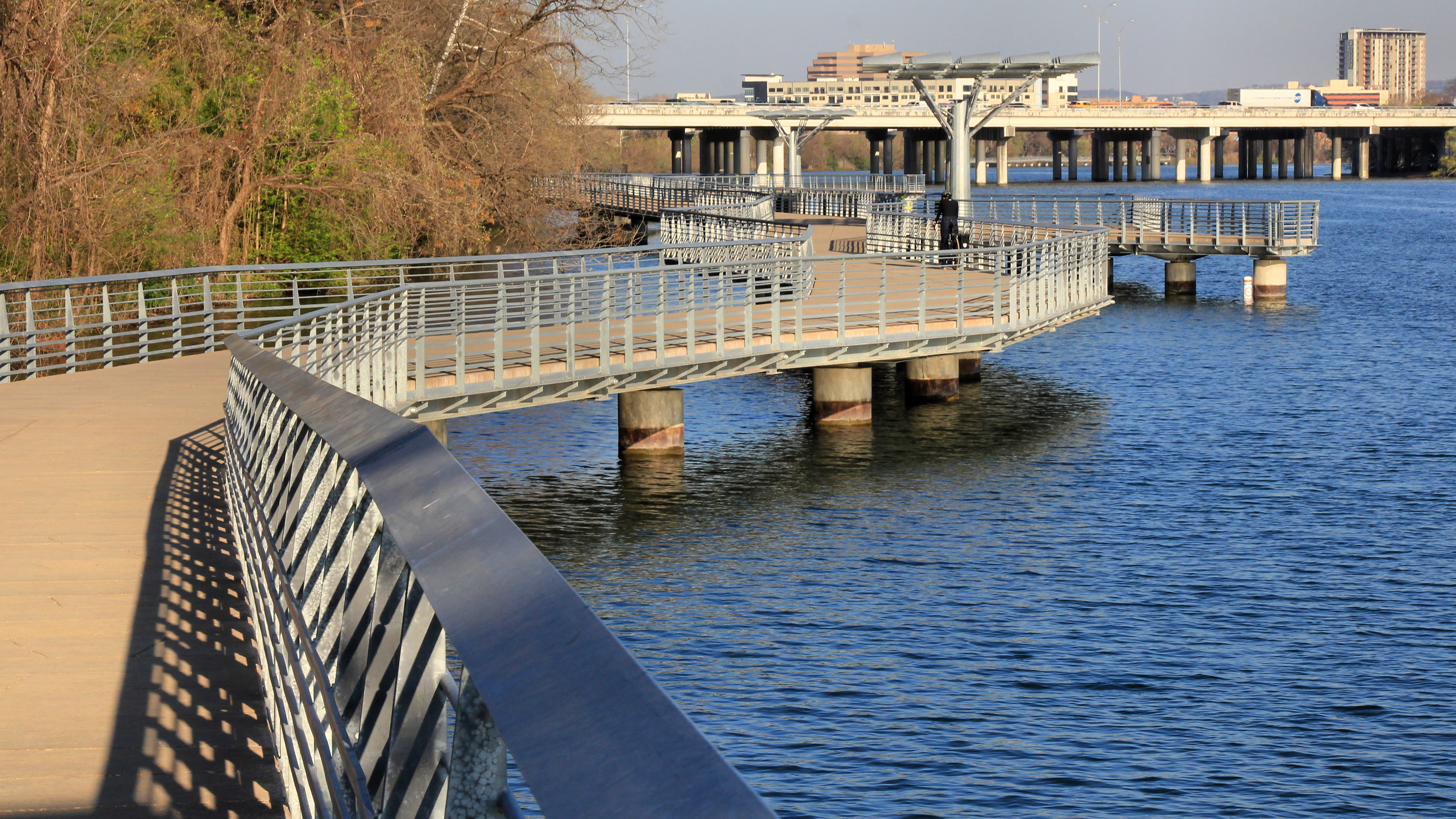
- Part of the boardwalk in 2018
- Length: 7,250ft
- Location: Austin, Texas, United States
- Began construction: October 2012
- Completed: June 2014
- Website: https://www.austintexas.gov/department/ann-and-roy-butler-hike-and-bike-trail-and-boardwalk-lady-bird-lake

The Boardwalk at Lady Bird Lake is a boardwalk along Lady Bird Lake in Austin, Texas, United States.

Construction on the $28 million project was completed during October 2012 – June 2014. Artist Ken Little's art installation Belting It Out was commissioned for the boardwalk and features 36 cast bronze belts displaying lyrics by Texas singers and songwriters.

Condé Nast Traveler says, "This section of the Ann and Roy Butler Hike and Bike Trail finally links the entire whole together. Take the time to enjoy a different perspective of Austin from the many viewing areas." The boardwalk begins near the Austin American-Statesman on East Riverside.

External image
- Boardwalk Map
