= Davis-White Northeast Neighborhood Park =

Park in Austin, Texas

- Coordinates: 30.303784975380424°N 97.65511606813449°W
- Area: 19.694 acres (7.970 ha)
- Operator: Austin Parks and Recreation Department

Davis-White Northeast Neighborhood Park is a 19.694 acres (7.970 ha) public space along Walnut Creek, located at 6705 Crystalbrook Dr. Austin, TX 78724. Renamed in 2007 after two Austin public safety heroes, Captain Willie Ray Davis and Captain Louie White, the park received a new playground in February 2025.
