= William Astor Kirk =

American civil rights activist and author

- Born: October 5, 1922; Harleton, Texas
- Died: August 12, 2011 (aged 88); Washington, D.C.
- Education: Howard University (BA, MA); London School of Economics (attended); University of Texas (PhD)
- Spouse: Vivian Tramble
- Children: 2

William Astor Kirk (October 5, 1922 – August 12, 2011) was a professor, author, a church lay leader and a social activist who worked for racial equality, gay rights, and to end segregation in the United Methodist Church. He also served in the Office of Economic Opportunity, after being appointed by President Lyndon Baines Johnson. A contemporary of Heman Sweatt he sought equal access to higher education at the University of Texas and eventually was the first African-American to be awarded a political science doctorate by UT.

== Personal life ==
William Astor "Bill" Kirk was born into poverty on October 5, 1922 in Harleton, an unincorporated community in deeply segregated East Texas. His parents were Alex and Exella Kirk. Kirk married Vivian Tramble in 1946. They had two children, William A. Kirk Jr. and Marie Kirk Dunn. Kirk is the uncle of former Ambassador Ron Kirk. He was a Christian from an early age and was active in the United Methodist Church. Kirk joined the Foundry United Methodist Church in 1984 located in Washington, D.C. and was a very active member for 25 years. His wife died on March 31, 2010. Kirk died the following year at Washington Hospital Center. A memorial was held at Foundry United Methodist Church officiated by the senior pastor, Rev. Dean Snyder.

=== Defining farm boy experiences ===
Kirk was born and reared on a 29-acre farm his father had inherited. His daily activities included caring for livestock, milking the cows, building the kitchen fire, drawing water from the well, and gathering eggs. He walked 4 miles to get the mail 3 times a week, picked cotton, hitched the wagon and went with his father to the village each month. He chopped wood and plowed the fields. While plowing behind a mule at about 15 years of age he had a very clear "road to Damascus", transformational moment, where he resolved to do something different than farm like his father.

=== Country church ===
Kirk's immediate family belonged to the Macedonia United Methodist Church in Marion County. At a regular weekly "revival service" where his grandmother had led him to, he found himself alone on the "mourner's bench". There, at age 13 and feeling pressure from the visiting preacher he "accepted Christ" and joined the Macedonia church. Looking back he had no regrets. Kirk later wrote that this experience contributed to his becoming a leader to eliminate involuntary racial segregation in the United Methodist Church.

== Education ==
He attended the "Friendly School" which had two classrooms. Upon reaching the 6th grade he moved up to the classroom for grades 6-10 taught by his uncle. Here he could listen to every classroom discussion and soon became intensely interested in the intellectually challenging subjects of "upper-class" students. Unlike the schools for "Whites" in the Harrison County School District, Kirk's school had no extracurricular activities, no drama or music classes, and no sports. He eagerly anticipated his graduation from the "Friendly School" in the spring of 1938.

In 1940 Kirk graduated from Center Point High School in the east Texas town of Pittsburg, then attended Wiley College in Marshall, Texas. In 1942 he moved to Washington, D. C. and began studying political science to earn a B.A. and M.A. at Howard University. There he worked at a YMCA and as a switchboard operator for the university, where he met his future wife, Vivian Tramble.

In 1946 Kirk earned his B.A. degree and was awarded his M.A. degree in 1947. Kirk was a Fulbright Scholar and attended the London School of Economics and Political Science from 1952 to 1953.

In 1958 he was the first African-American to earn a doctorate in political science from University of Texas.

== Career ==
In the late 1940s Kirk returned to Texas from Howard University and began his career in academia. His first position was in 1947 as an assistant professor of government at Samuel Huston College, in Austin, Texas. The school later became Huston–Tillotson University.

After studying in London in 1953, he became a full professor and the chairman of the government department at Huston–Tillotson.

In 1959 Kirk helped establish the Citizenship Education Foundation Inc., a non-profit dedicated to public affairs programs of the Department of Social Sciences at Huston–Tillotson. Working with the CEF, he secured the approval of a $25,000 restricted grant from the Ford Foundation. However, the school's leadership demanded that half of the funds must be given to the administration, not the public affairs programs. Faced with this dilemma, Kirk did not accept the grant and resigned from Huston–Tillotson June 30, 1960.

In 1968 President Lyndon B. Johnson pressed Kirk into accepting the position of deputy regional director of the Southwest Region for the U.S. Office of Economic Opportunity. He was later promoted to Washington and continued to serve under the administrations of Nixon, Ford, Carter, and Reagan.

After leaving federal employment, Kirk founded the Organization Management Services Corporation and was its CEO. He also served as an adjunct professor in the Graduate School of Management and Technology at the University of Maryland and held teaching positions at the Boston University School of Theology and Rutgers.

== Support for civil rights ==
Kirk took action many civil rights issues during his time in Austin.

=== NAACP and Texas School Districts ===
Kirk worked as an organizer for the Austin chapter of the NAACP 1940s and became a leader. When the state NAACP challenged school districts in LaGrange and Waxahachie to test their separate but equal schools in Federal courts, Kirk was enlisted to help. He made extensive studies in both districts and provided expert witness testimony in the Waxahachie Independent School District case, where the judge ruled in the NAACP's favor. The LaGrange Independent School District agreed to immediate corrective action and settled the suit.

=== Integrating Austin Public Libraries ===
Through peaceful protests he helped end segregation at the Austin Public Library. At that time Blacks were only welcomed at George Washington Carver branch library in East Austin. Kirk determined there was no statute barring blacks from using the main library or other branches. He was told equals access was assured because he could order books and they would be transferred to the Carver branch. Kirk purposely "overburdened" the system to protest this arrangement. He requested multi-volume references materials, challenging the system. In the summer of 1951 Kirk requested the City Council make a declaration on the policy. They referred the request to the City Library Commission, who recommended no change to the policy. Kirk then made a presentation to the City Council and personally lobbied the swing Council member. After a postponement, the city council voted on December 27, 1951 to desegregate the Austin Public Library.

=== Integrating Zilker Park and Barton Creek Pools ===
In 1948 at the request of two of his Huston–Tillotson students, Kirk sought to change the practice of segregation at Zilker Park and Barton Creek Pool. He met with the director of Austin's Park and Recreations who was sympathetic. Together they initiated a plan of unpublicized student visits and use of various facilities at Zilker Park. Subsequently, Blacks began to use the park and also the pool, which is located within the park.

=== Black Texans applying to University of Texas grad school ===
In April 1948 college students from historically black Texas schools converged at Huston–Tillotson with the intention of applying to University of Texas graduate school. This was after Thurgood Marshall had been in Austin to argue the Sweatt v. Painter case and had said at a rally that applications from Blacks were forthcoming. When thirty-three were barred from submitting their applications for grad school at UT, the group went to Senate chamber. Governor Jester heard their message. Kirk whose own suit was pending spoke for the group and was quoted in the local press. The UT registrar directed them to apply to Texas State University for Negroes (TSUN), saying "That's the law in Texas".

=== Racial segregation in higher education ===
The NAACP supported Heman Sweatt in his challenge to segregated education facilities at the University of Texas. Before the case was appealed in the federal courts, the Texas legislature had pursued "separate but equal" as a solution, creating the Texas State University for Negroes for graduate studies.

In December 1947 Kirk applied to grad school at the University of Texas (UT) and was offered a spot at TSUN, but because the TSUN lacked adequate resources for his program, he declined. Kirk applied again in 1948 and was admitted to TSUN, however his courses were not going to be taught at the Austin campus. Finally in the fall of 1949, he was assigned classes that were taught by Austin UT professors but held at the YMCA. Kirk found this unacceptable and demanded his tuition be refunded.

The University of Texas allowed Kirk to attend classes on campus in the spring of 1950, but stipulated that he sit at the back of the classroom and have a ring of metal placed around his desk. This was to ensure that Kirk's "blackness wouldn't rub off on the white students." Kirk threatened to sue.

In June 1950, United States Supreme Court decided the Sweatt v. Painter case and found against segregated graduate level education. Kirk acted quickly and in the fall of 1950 he enrolled with Heman Sweatt and four other African-American men at the University of Texas.

=== Involvement in the United Methodist Church ===
Kirk had a lifelong involvement with the United Methodist Church, often opposing segregation, both official and unofficial, within the denomination. He fought successfully to end institutional segregation in the church.

From 1961 to 1966 he was the director of the public affairs department of the Board of Church and Society. In 1987 and 1988 he was the board's interim executive.

While a professor at Huston–Tillotson College in 1960, he became secretary of the Committee of Five. This group had a mandate to end racial segregation within the denomination.

At the denomination's 1964 annual conference, Kirk was deeply angered by a proposal to continue segregated churches within the United Methodist Church. He successfully championed a motion, known as "The Kirk Amendment," which committed the denomination to ending the institutional practice of allowing segregation of African Americans within the church.

Later he became chair of the Committee of Five and played a part in negotiating the mergers of North Carolina-Virginia and the Delaware annual conferences.

Kirk's fight to end segregation in the church was not over, however. In 1965 southern church leaders sought the right to preserve segregated conferences within their jurisdictions. He took a leave of absence to prepare his counter arguments. Ultimately his arguments prevailed and the decision quoted his phrase that segregation had become a "distinctively connectional" matter.

Near the end of his life Kirk wrote a resolution intended for the next denominational conference, proposing to abolish institutional discrimination against gays within the United Methodist Church.

== Legacy ==
Upon his death Kirk's inclusive civil rights legacy influence was evidenced by the diversity of the entities that published his obituary. They included the Washington Post, the Austin American-Statesman, the Huston–Tillotson University, the United Methodist Churches official online ministry, and the Washington Blade.

== Bibliography ==
He was the author of the national award-winning "Ending Institutional Discrimination Within United Methodism". His works include:

- Nonprofit Organization Governance (1986)
- Desegregation of the Methodist Church Polity: Reform Movements that Ended Racial Segregation (2005)
- Board Members: Governing Roles & Responsibilities (2007)
- One Life: Three Professional Careers-My Civil Rights Story (2008)
- Ending Institutional Discrimination Within United Methodism (2010)
- The Politics of Ending Church Discrimination (2010)
