= Walnut Creek Metropolitan Park =

Public park in Austin, Texas, USA

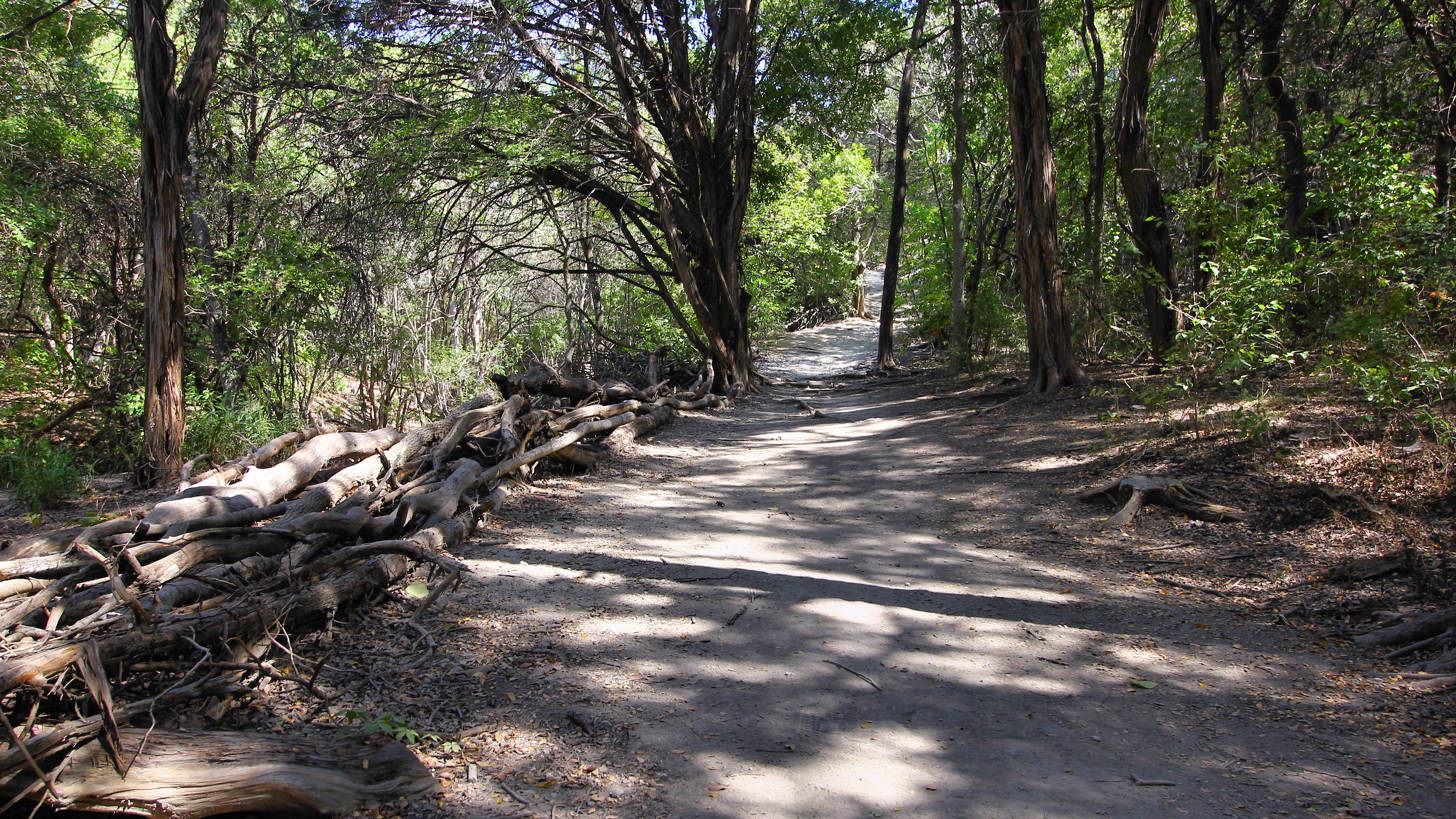
- A trail in the park
- Interactive map of Walnut Creek Metropolitan Park
- Location: 12138 N. Lamar Blvd. Austin, Texas, USA
- Coordinates: 30.400°N 97.686°W

Walnut Creek Metropolitan Park is a 293-acre (119 ha) public park in Northeast Austin, Texas. The park features 15 miles of hiking trails, multiple softball fields, a swimming pool, a playground, and numerous barbecue pits and picnic tables. It is notable for having a large off-leash area for dogs, and is also popular with local mountain bikers for its extensive network of trails. The park is hilly and wooded, with access to Walnut Creek and the surrounding limestone bluffs.

== History ==
Part of what is now Walnut Creek Metropolitan Park was historically inhabited by the indigenous Tonkawa people, and the area has yielded several archaeological finds.

The land for Walnut Creek Metropolitan Park was purchased by the city of Austin in 1964. Before it was a park, it was owned by the Gracy family as a part of their farm.
