= Walnut Creek (Central Texas) =

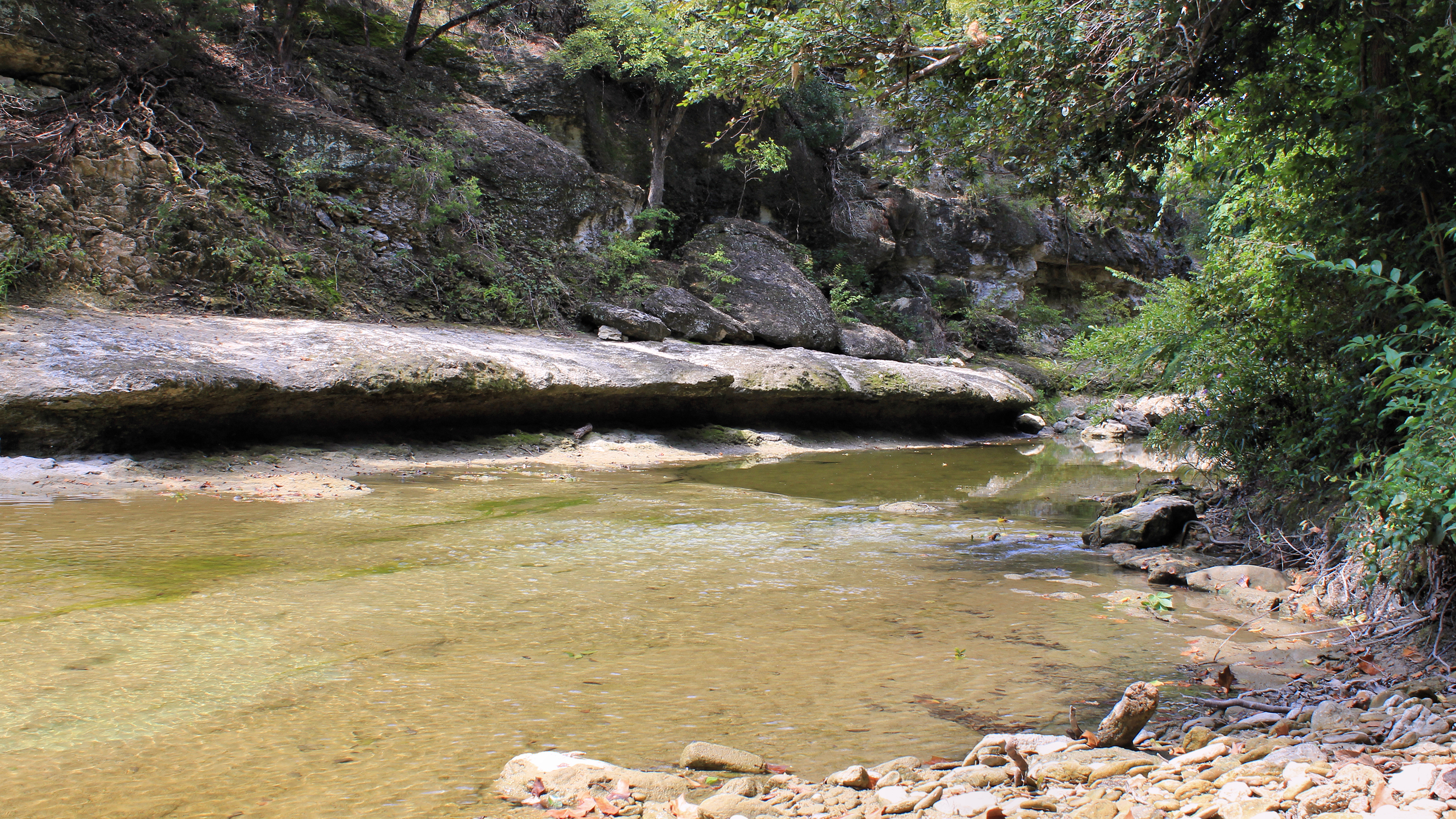

Location
- Country: United States

Physical characteristics
- Source
  - location: Edwards Aquifer
- Mouth
  - location: Colorado River
  - coordinates: 30°15′44″N 97°38′29″W
- Length: 23 miles (37 km)
- Basin size: 36,000 acres (150 km^{2})

Walnut Creek is a 23-mile (37 km) long tributary stream of the Colorado River in Texas. It flows from north to south, crossing the Edwards Plateau on the western side of Austin, down to the Blackland Prairie on the eastern side of the city where it then drains into the Colorado River downstream of Longhorn Dam. The stream's upper region flows over limestone, while the southern stretch passes through deeper clay soils and hardwood forest. Walnut Creek's watershed, spanning 36,000 acres (15,000 ha), is the largest in Central Austin.

The creek can be accessed at several local parks, most notably Walnut Creek Metropolitan Park and Balcones District Park.

== History ==
Walnut Creek was inhabited along its length by the Tonkawa in small settlements. In 1833, the stream was the site of the first documented conflict in Travis County between the indigenous natives and settlers when an attack on a settler hunting party resulted in two deaths. However, the Tonkawa soon allied with the American settlers against the larger rival tribes in the region—the Comanche, Kiowa, and Apache—often serving as scouts for the Texas Rangers and U.S. Army.

== See also ==
- List of rivers of Texas
