= Seaholm Power Plant =

Historic structure in Austin, Texas

- U.S. National Register of Historic Places
- Recorded Texas Historic Landmark
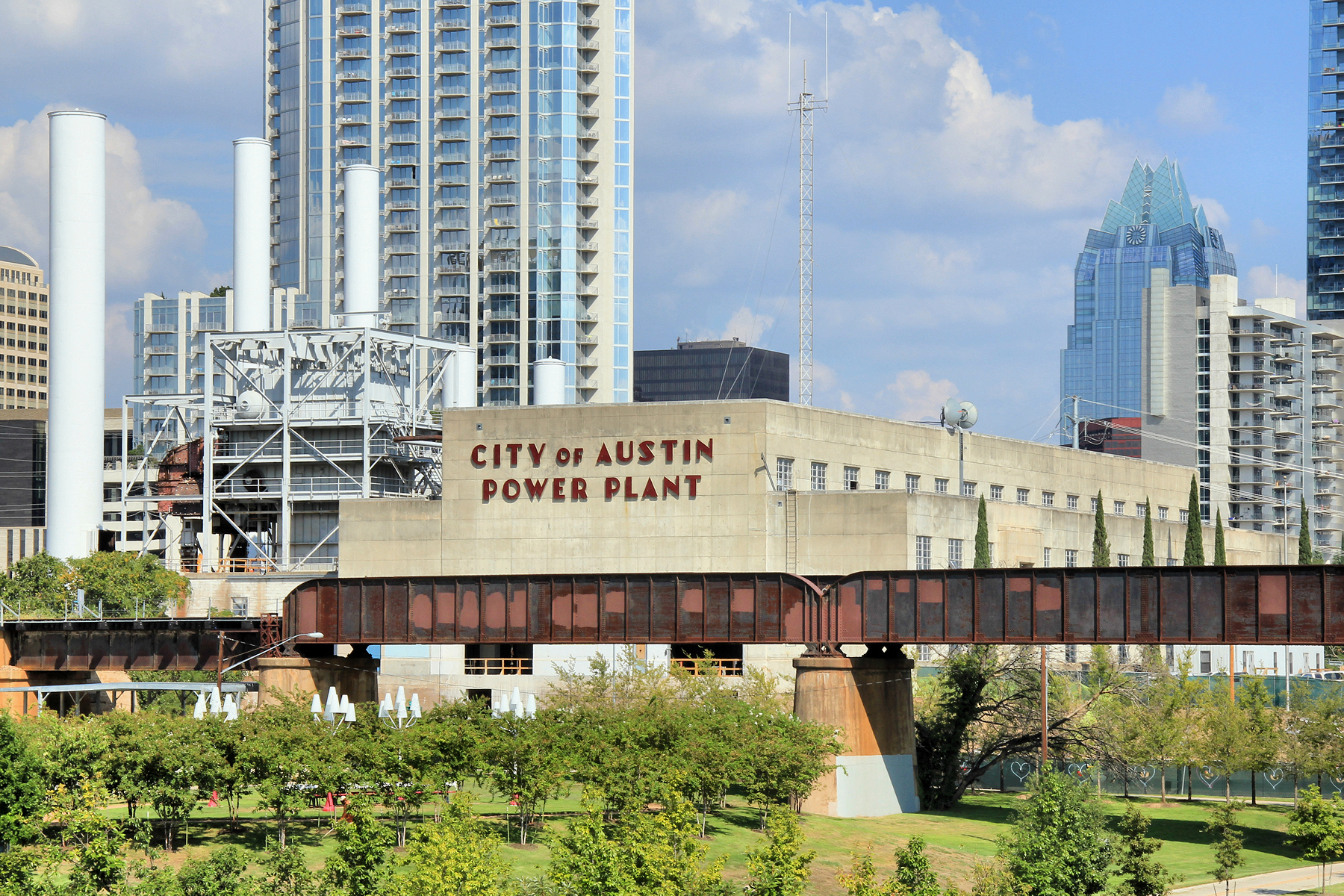
- Seaholm Power Plant in 2013, viewed from the west

- Location within Texas Location within the United States
- Location: 800 W Cesar Chavez St; Austin, Texas
- Coordinates: 30°15′59″N 97°45′9″W
- Area: 2.75 acres (1.11 ha)
- Built: 1951
- Architect: Burns & McDonnell
- Architectural style: Art Moderne
- NRHP reference No.: 13000614
- RTHL No.: 13974

Significant dates
- Added to NRHP: August 20, 2013
- Designated RTHL: 2007

The Seaholm Power Plant is a historic former power station located on the north shore of Lady Bird Lake in Downtown Austin, Texas. Opened in 1951, it is listed on the National Register of Historic Places and designated as a Recorded Texas Historic Landmark. The power plant ceased operation in 1996, and the facility and site were later redeveloped into a mixed-use district.

== History ==
=== Operating power plant ===
The Seaholm Power Plant was commissioned in 1948 to meet Austin's growing demand for electric power. The engineering firm Burns & McDonnell designed the complex, which was constructed in two phases in 1951 and 1955. The facility originally included a turbine generator building, a water intake structure, and an oil heating building. A guard booth and a storage building were added to the site later. Originally called "Power Plant No. 2," on 2 June 1960 the plant was renamed posthumously for Walter E. Seaholm, a prominent figure in the administration of Austin's municipal utilities.

Seaholm served as Austin's sole source of electric power from 1950 to 1959, until demand outpaced the 120 megawatts the plant could generate with all five boilers running. As other stations were built the city's reliance on Seaholm waned, and in 1989 the plant stopped providing power to the city, though it was used as a training facility until 1996, when it closed entirely.

=== Redevelopment ===
The site lay dormant until 2004, when the Austin City Council requested proposals for redevelopment partners. Several firms and consultancies formed an organization called "Seaholm Power, LLC", which was designated in April 2005 to lead redevelopment of the defunct power plant and the surrounding site. A master development agreement was reached with the city in April 2008 specifying the renovations and new construction that would be undertaken.

Work began on the plant's redevelopment in mid-2013. The interior of the turbine generator building was converted to a mixture of office, retail and restaurant space, with tenants occupying the facility beginning in 2015. A residential tower called Seaholm Residences was constructed at the west end of the site, also opening in 2015. As of 2021, the city has not selected a final plan for the redevelopment of the water intake facility.

== Power generation ==
Seaholm was a semi-outdoor power plant, with its boilers outdoors but its generators inside the turbine generator building. It ultimately housed five Westinghouse turbine generators; the plant was originally built with two 20-megawatt generators and later expanded with two more 20-megawatt units and then one larger 40-megawatt unit. Seaholm was built with underground ash pits to accommodate coal-firing, but in fact the plant never ran on coal; the oil heating building and underground fuel tanks also allowed the plant to burn crude oil, yet over its operating lifetime it was fired primarily with natural gas.

== Architecture ==
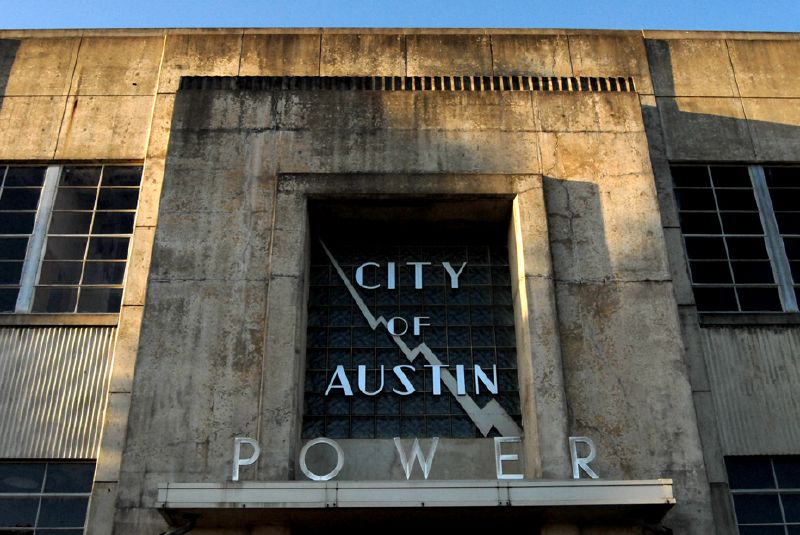
Exterior lettering above the east entry to the Turbine Generator Building's south face

=== Turbine generator building ===
The largest building (which formerly housed the turbine generators) stands three stories high and faces southward, toward the lake. The exterior surface of the building is of structural cast-in-place reinforced concrete, punctuated by two south-facing doors and numerous large industrial windows. Metal Art Moderne-style lettering on glass-block panels above the two entryways reads "City of Austin," and additional letters atop the awnings over the entryways read "Light" (above the west door) and "Power" (above the east door). The west facade carries additional metal lettering reading "City of Austin Power Plant." The north facade of the building is dominated by the five external boilers and their tall smokestacks. The building's interior is divided into four levels centered on the vast two-story turbine room.

=== Water intake structure ===
The water intake structure sits on the shore of Lady Bird Lake directly south of the turbine generator building. The structure shares many design and architectural elements with the generator building, with exposed structural concrete walls and large industrial windows opening into a vast interior space. The south face of the building rises two stories above the lake, with ten sluice gates through which cooling water for the plant's steam condensers was taken in. This water was pumped to the generator building through massive underground pipes; after being used as coolant the water was discharged into nearby Shoal Creek.

== See also ==
- National Register of Historic Places listings in Travis County, Texas
- Recorded Texas Historic Landmarks in Travis County
