= Lady Bird Lake =

Reservoir in Austin, Texas, US

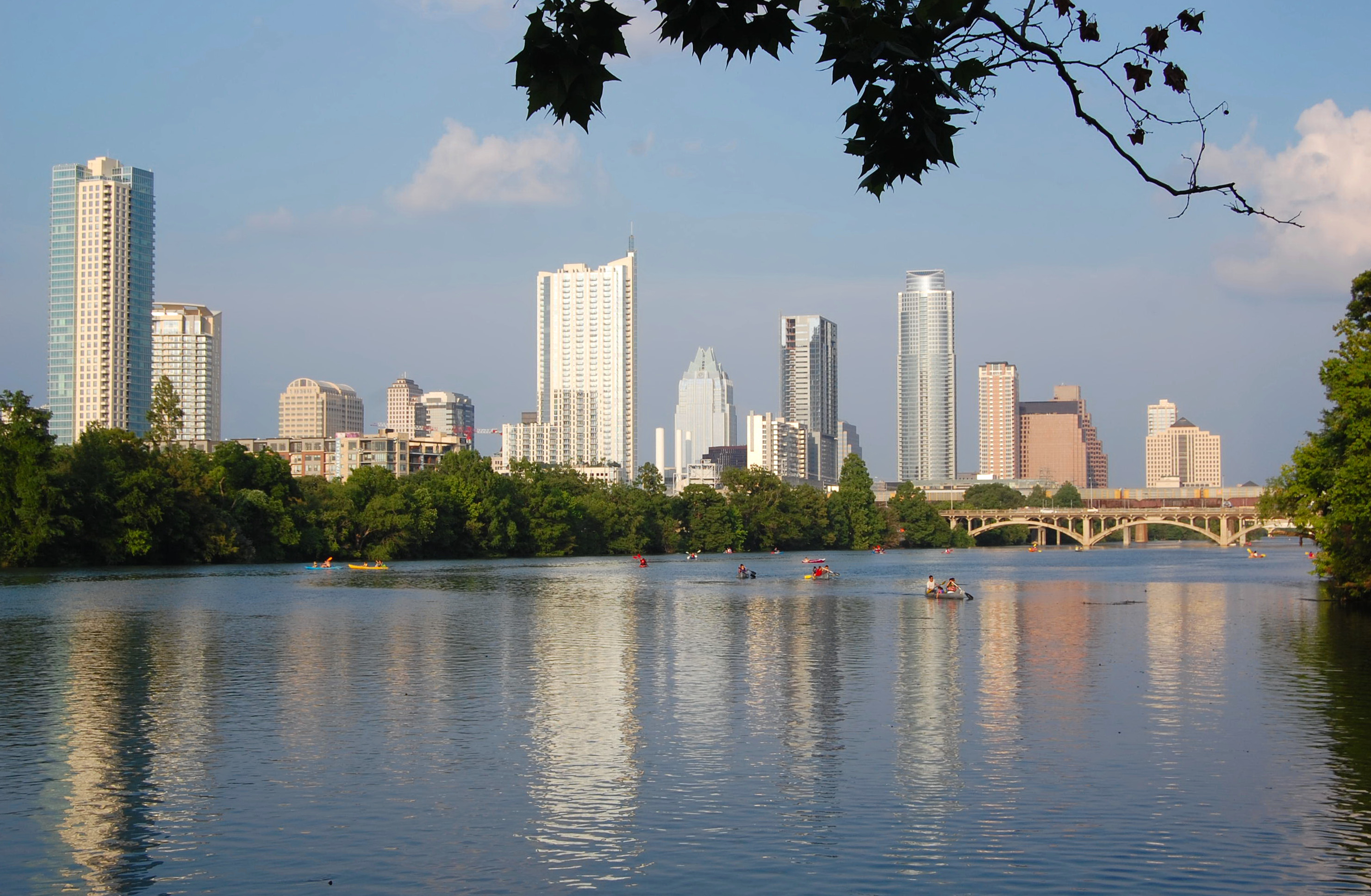
- View from Lady Bird Lake toward Downtown Austin

- Location within Texas Location within the United States
- Location: Central Austin, Texas, United States
- Coordinates: 30°15′03″N 97°42′49″W
- Type: Power plant cooling and recreational reservoir
- Primary inflows: Colorado River
- Primary outflows: Colorado River
- Basin countries: United States
- Built: 1960
- Surface area: 468 acres (189 ha)
- Max. depth: 18 ft (5.5 m)
- Surface elevation: 428 ft (130 m)

Lady Bird Lake (formerly, and still colloquially referred to as, Town Lake) is a river-like reservoir on the Colorado River in Austin, Texas, United States. The City of Austin created the reservoir in 1960 as a cooling pond for a new city power plant. The lake, which has a surface area of 416 acres (168 ha), is now used primarily for recreation and flood control. The reservoir is named in honor of former First Lady of the United States Lady Bird Johnson.

Lady Bird Lake is the easternmost lake of a chain of reservoirs on the river, which is completely located in Texas, and should not be confused with the larger Colorado River located in the Southwestern United States. This chain, known locally as the Texas Highland Lakes, also includes Lake Buchanan, Inks Lake, Lake LBJ, Lake Marble Falls, Lake Travis, and Lake Austin.

== History ==
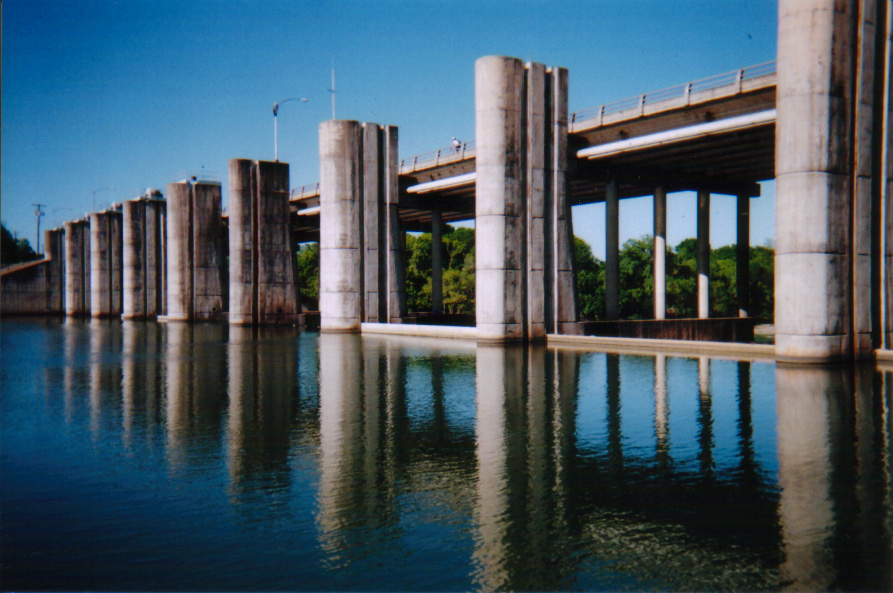
Longhorn Dam impounds Lady Bird Lake

The City of Austin constructed Longhorn Dam in 1960 to form Town Lake. The city needed the reservoir to serve as a cooling pond for the Holly Street Power Plant, which operated from 1960 until 2007.

Before 1971, the shoreline of Town Lake was mostly a mixture of weeds, unkempt bushes, and trash. Local television station KTBC referred to the lake as an "eyesore". Some concerned Austinites led small projects to clean up the lake. Roberta Crenshaw, chair of the Austin Board of Parks and Recreation, purchased nearly 400 trees and shrubs in an effort to spearhead parkland development around the lake. During his two terms in office (1971–75), the Mayor of Austin, Roy Butler, led the Austin City Council to establish the Town Lake Beautification Committee, and he appointed Lady Bird Johnson as the project's honorary chairman. Johnson's involvement brought attention and money (including $19,000 of her own) to the Town Lake project, allowing for the planting of hundreds of shrubs and trees. The city also built a system of hike and bike trails along the shoreline of the lake.

On July 26, 2007, the Austin City Council passed a resolution authorizing the renaming of the reservoir from Town Lake to Lady Bird Lake in honor of Lady Bird Johnson, who had died earlier that month. Johnson had declined the honor of having the lake renamed for her while she was alive. In renaming the lake, the City Council recognized Johnson's dedication to beautifying the lake and her efforts to create a recreational trail system around the lake's shoreline.

In 2009, non-profit organization Keep Austin Beautiful launched "Clean Lady Bird Lake". The program mobilizes thousands of community volunteers annually to conduct large-scale cleanups along the lake every other month and targeted cleanups throughout the year.

On February 5, 2024, members of the Austin Police Department responded to the 300 block of West Cesar Chavez Street, where first responders recovered a dead body that had been discovered by civilians earlier, following a series of four other bodies recovered from the lake in 2023.

In June 2025, authorities discovered yet another man's body in Austin's Lady Bird Lake, bringing the total count to at least 38 individuals recovered from the waters since 2022.

== Recreational uses ==
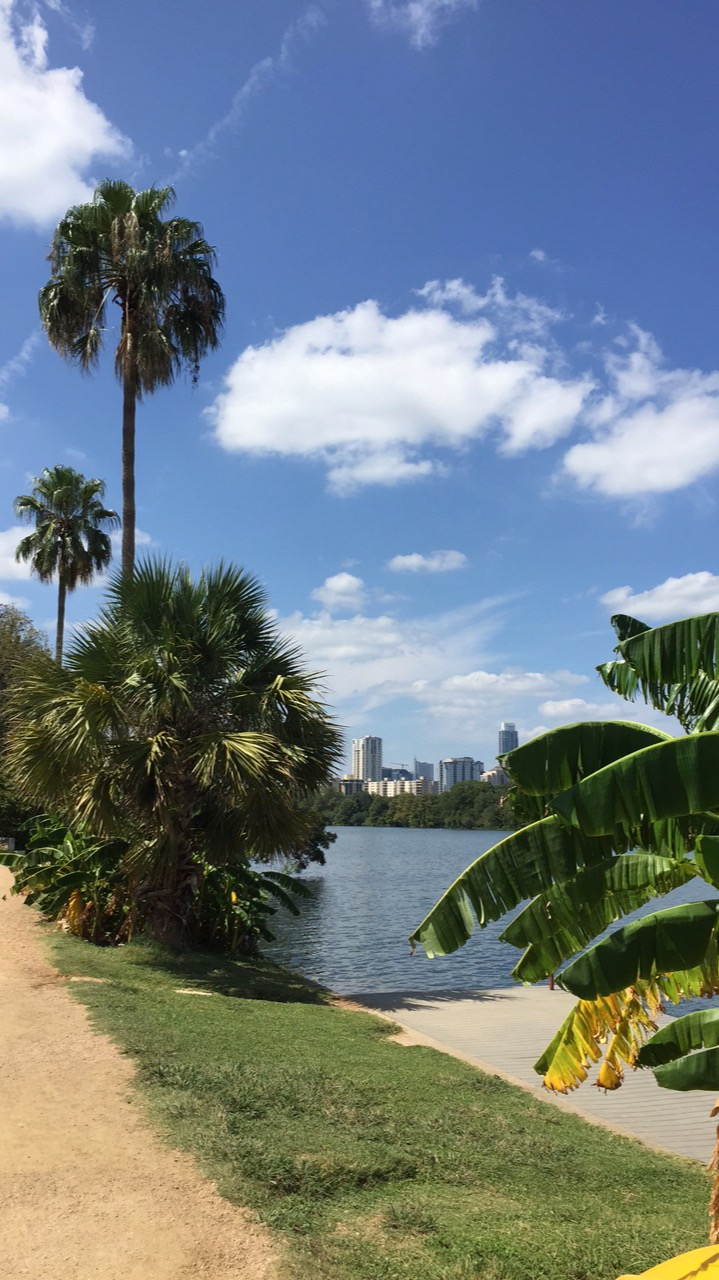
Lady Bird Lake and downtown skyline, from East Riverside neighborhood.

Lady Bird Lake is a major recreation area for the City of Austin. The lake's banks are bounded by the Ann and Roy Butler Hike-and-Bike Trail, and businesses offer recreational watercraft services along the lakefront portion of the trail. Austin's largest downtown park, Zilker Park, is adjacent to the lake, and the water from Barton Springs, a major attraction for swimmers, flows into the lake.

The City of Austin prohibits the operation of most motorized watercraft on Lady Bird Lake. As a result, the lake serves as a popular recreational area for paddleboards, kayaks, canoes, dragon boats, and rowing shells. Austin's warm climate and the river's calm waters, nearly 6-mile (9.7 km) length and straight courses are especially popular with crew teams and clubs. Along with the University of Texas women's rowing team and coeducational club rowing team, who practice on Lady Bird Lake year-round, teams from other universities (including the University of Wisconsin, the University of Chicago, the University of Oklahoma, and the University of Nebraska) train on Lady Bird Lake during Christmas holidays and spring breaks.

Other water sports along the shores of the lake include swimming in Deep Eddy Pool, the oldest swimming pool in Texas, and Barton Springs Pool, a natural pool on Barton Creek which flows into Lady Bird Lake. Below Tom Miller Dam is Red Bud Isle, a small island formed by the 1900 collapse of the McDonald Dam that serves as a recreation area with a dog park and access to the lake for canoeing and fishing.

Swimming in Lady Bird Lake is illegal not due to poor water quality from the run-off from area streets, which is a false rumor, but rather due to several drownings as well as debris in the water from bridges and dams destroyed by floods in years past. The City of Austin enacted the ban in 1964, and the fine can be up to $500.

For the first time in August 2019, a toxic blue-green algae was found in the lake and reportedly killed at least five dogs who were exposed.

Music venues on the banks of Lady Bird Lake are home to a number of events year-round, including the Austin City Limits Music Festival in the fall, the Austin Reggae Festival and Spamarama in the spring, and many open-air concerts at Auditorium Shores on the south bank and Fiesta Gardens on the north bank. The Austin Aqua Festival was held on the shores of Lady Bird Lake from 1962 until 1998. The late Austin resident and blues guitarist Stevie Ray Vaughan played a number of concerts at Auditorium Shores and is honored with a memorial statue on the south bank.

=== Ann and Roy Butler Hike-and-Bike Trail and Boardwalk ===
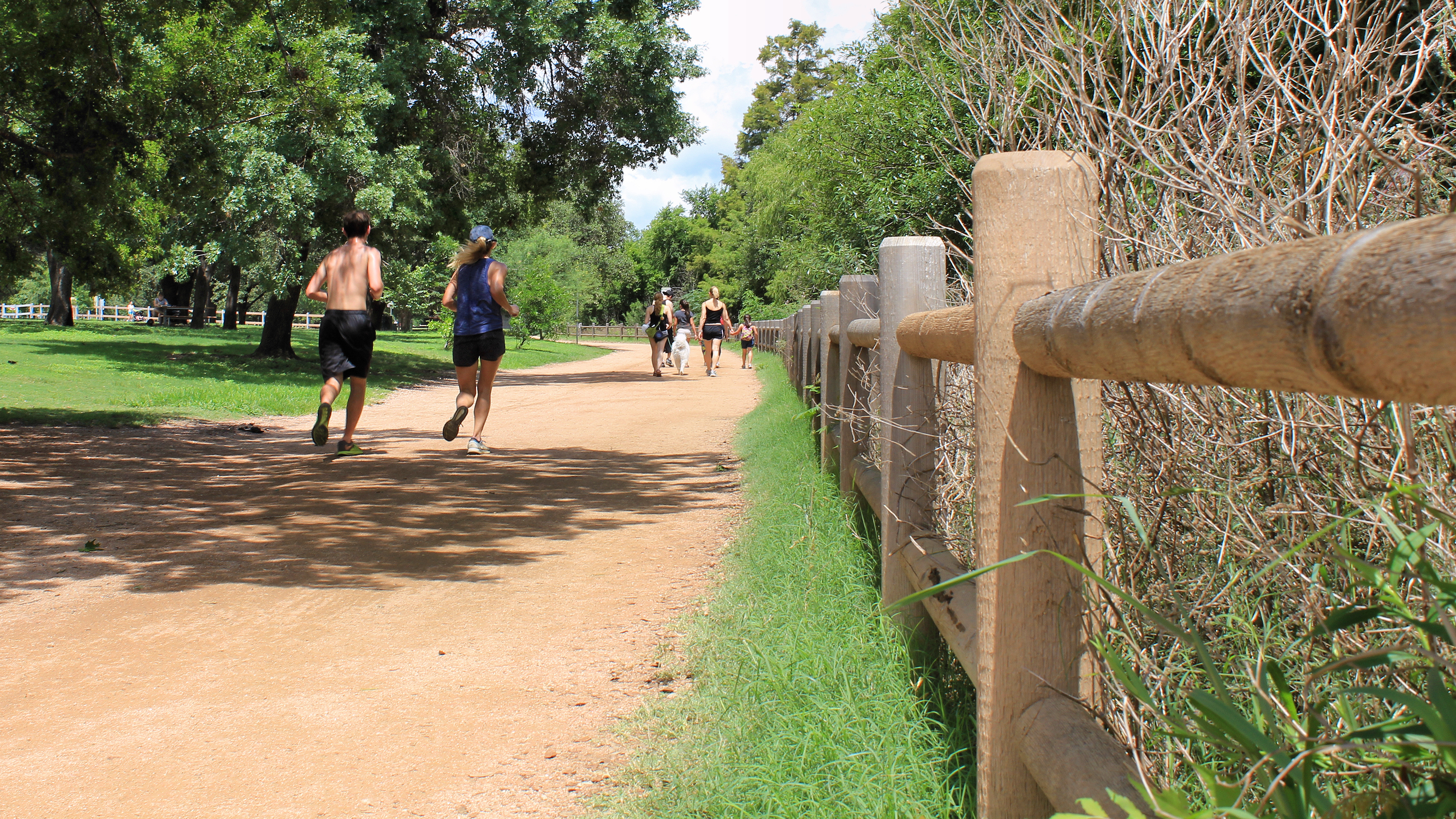
Many Austinites take advantage of the Butler Trail to keep fit by walking, running or cycling.

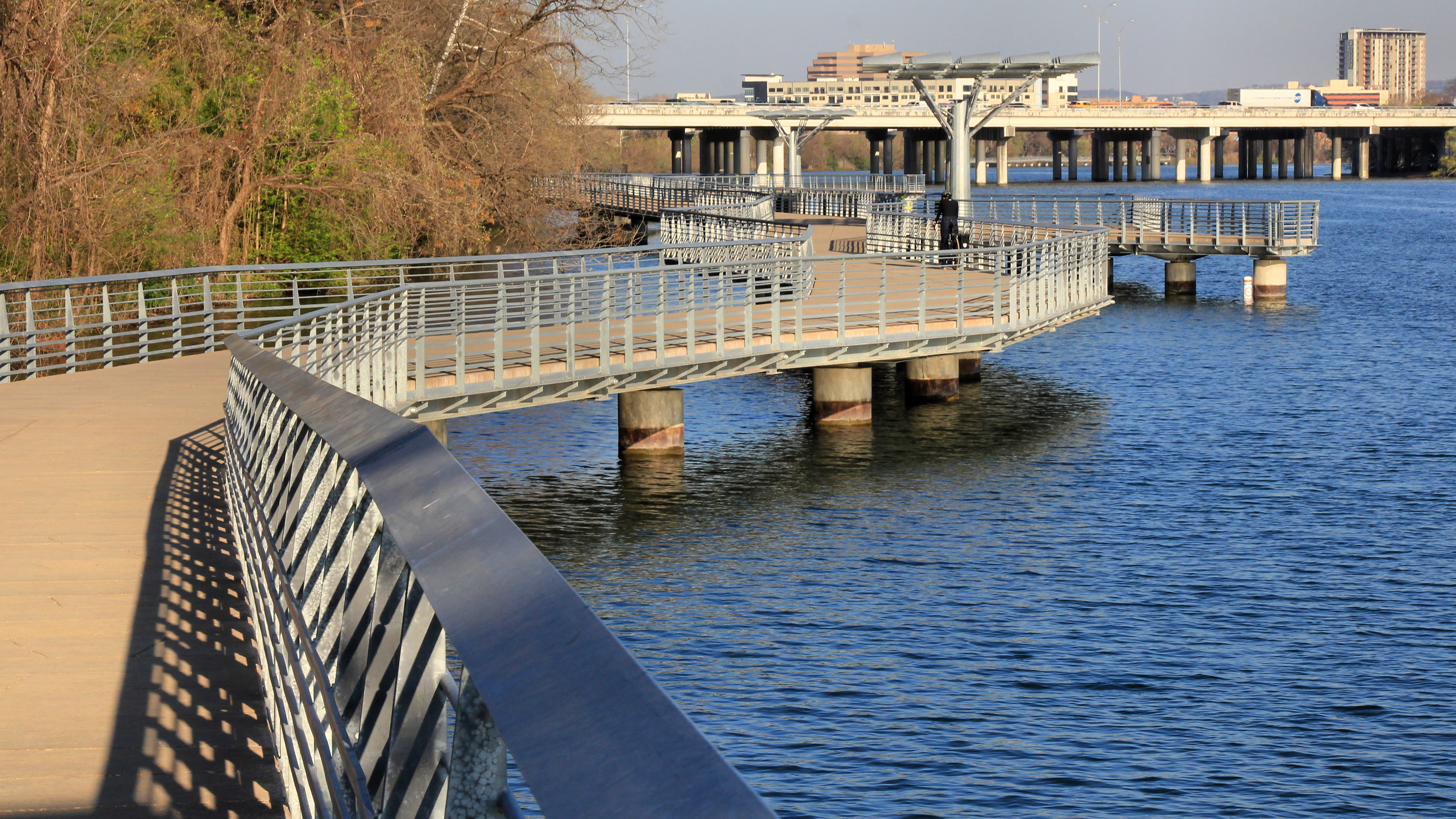
Part of the boardwalk in 2018

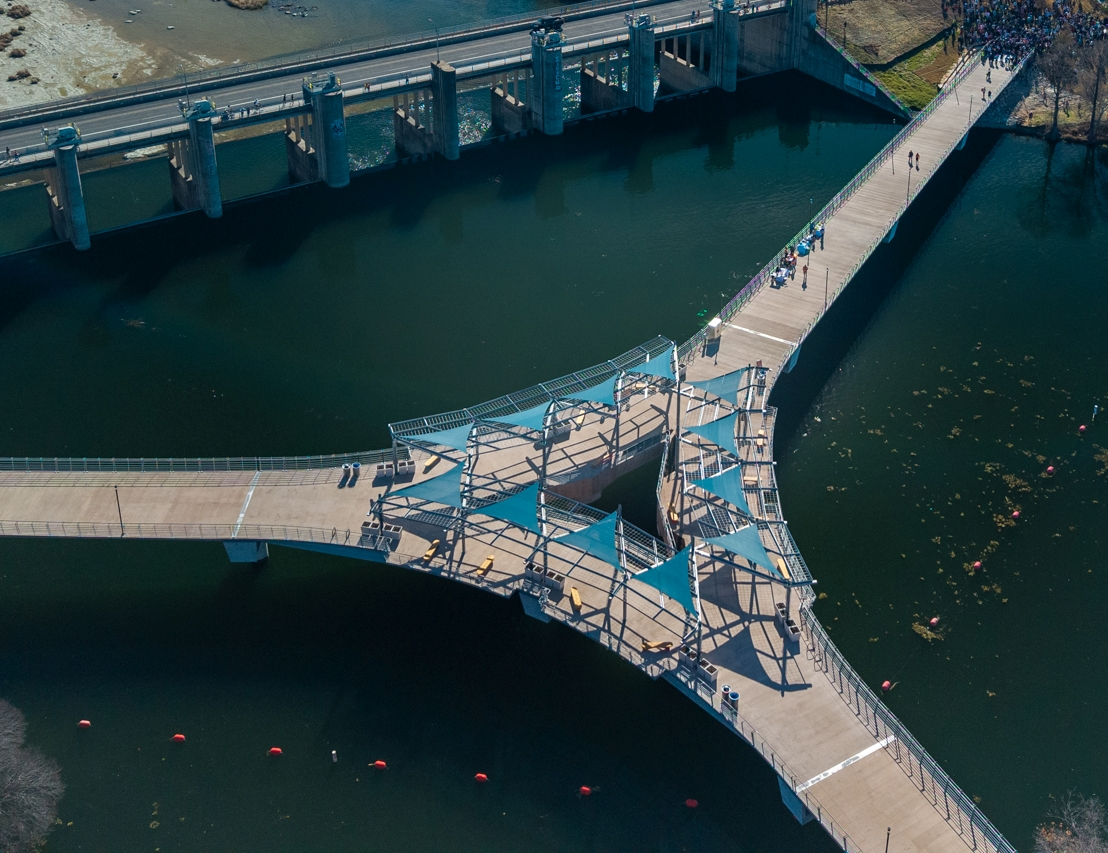
Wishbone Bridge

In 2011, the City of Austin renamed the Town Lake Hike and Bike Trail to the Ann and Roy Butler Hike-and-Bike Trail. Mayor Butler and his wife, Ann, were instrumental in transforming the shores of Lady Bird Lake into a park area with a trail and landscaped spaces. The trail creates a complete circuit around Lady Bird Lake and is one of the oldest urban Texas hike and bike paths. The trail is the longest trail designed for non-motorized traffic maintained by the City of Austin Parks and Recreation Department. A local nonprofit, The Trail Conservancy, formed in 2003, is the trail's primary steward since 2022 and has made trail-wide improvements by adding landscaping, user amenities and infrastructure including trailheads and lakefront gathering areas, locally-designed jewel box restrooms, exercise equipment, as well as doing trail wide ecological restoration work on an ongoing basis.

The Butler Trail loop was completed in 2014 with the public-private partnership 1-mile Boardwalk at Lady Bird Lake project, which was spearheaded by The Trail Conservancy. Construction on the $28 million project was completed during October 2012 – June 2014.

The trail is 10.1 miles (16.3 km) long and mostly flat, with 97.5% of it at less than an 8% grade. The trail's surface is smooth and is mostly crushed granite except for a few lengths of concrete and a boardwalk on the South-side of the lake. A pedestrian bridge incorporated into the trail bridges Barton Creek. The Roberta Crenshaw Pedestrian Walkway spans Lady Bird Lake beneath MoPac Boulevard and provides the trail's westernmost crossing of Lady Bird Lake.

The trail encompasses the Lou Neff Point Gazebo at the confluence of Barton Creek and Lady Bird Lake. It is listed as 'Austin Art in Public Places'.

On February 7, 2026, the City of Austin opened Wishbone Bridge—a three way bridge—to create a north-south connection on the Butler Trail across Lady Bird Lake that gets trail users off of the sidewalks on Longhorn Dam and away from the heavy traffic across the dam. Construction of the bridge started in the summer of 2024 and cost $25 million paid for with $20 million from a 2020 bond package, a $4.1 million federal grant and other money from 2012 and 2016 bonds. The center of the bridge is a 76-foot-wide shaded plaza with landscaping, benches and bike racks added by the Trail Conservancy.

=== Fishing ===
Lady Bird Lake has been stocked with several species of fish intended to improve the utility of the reservoir for recreational fishing. The predominant fish species in Lady Bird Lake are largemouth bass, catfish, carp, and sunfish. Fishing is regulated by the State of Texas, requiring a fishing license, and daily bag and length limits apply for most species.

A ban on the consumption of fish caught in the lake was issued by the City of Austin in 1990, as a result of excessively high levels of chlordane found in the fish. Although the use of chlordane as a pesticide was banned in the United States in 1988, the chemical sticks strongly to soil particles and can continue to pollute groundwater for years after its application. The ban on the consumption of fish caught in the lake was finally lifted in 1999.

The ADA-accessible Holly Fishing Pier, built by the Trail Conservancy on the north shore of the lake near Festival Beach, opened in 2025.

== Drinking water uses ==
The first water treatment facility in the City of Austin, the Thomas C. Green Water Treatment Plant, was built in 1925 to treat water from the Colorado River. The plant occupied 6 acres (2.4 ha) just west of the principal downtown business district. The water treatment facility was decommissioned in late 2008.
