= Wenatchee Fire Station No. 1 =

- Wenatchee Fire Station #1
- U.S. National Register of Historic Places
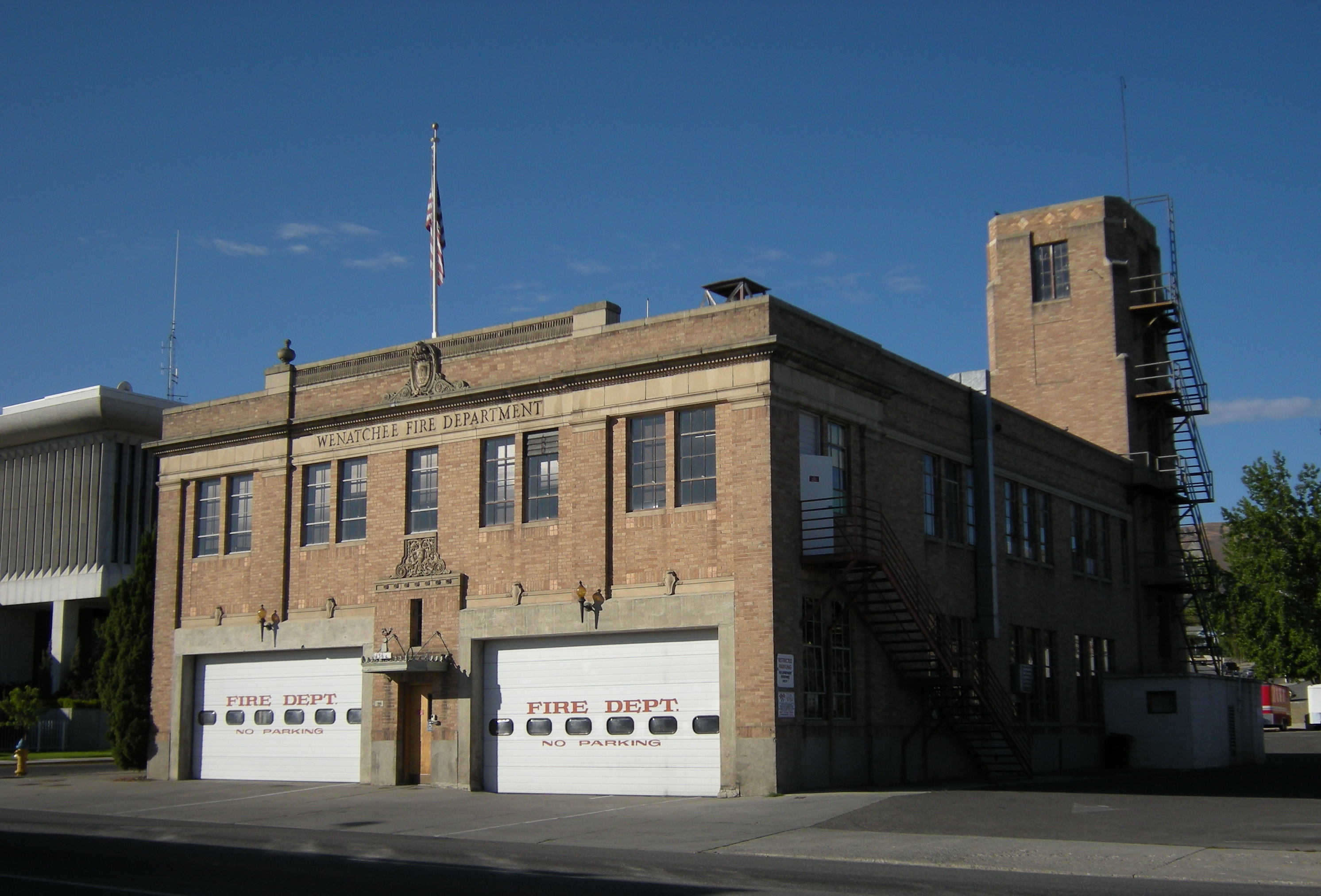

- Location within Washington (state)
- Location: 136 S. Chelan Ave., Wenatchee, Washington
- Coordinates: 47°25′17″N 120°18′44″W
- Area: less than one acre
- Built: 1929
- Built by: Colonial Construction Co.
- Architect: Ludwig O. Solberg
- Architectural style: Beaux Arts
- NRHP reference No.: 04000953
- Added to NRHP: September 10, 2004

The Wenatchee Fire Station No. 1 is a historic fire station in Wenatchee, Washington. It was built in 1929 and listed on the National Register of Historic Places in 2004 as Wenatchee Fire Station #1.

It is significant as a work of architect Ludwig O. Solberg. It includes a five-story tower, which serves both as a hose tower and as a firefighting training tower.

According to its NRHP nomination, "The building's symmetry and classical detailing play heavily upon the Beaux Arts styling, while the hose tower/practice tower owes it design influence to a Gothic church steeple."
