= Douglas County Courthouse =

Douglas County Courthouse may refer to:

- Douglas County Courthouse (Georgia), Douglasville, Georgia
- Douglas County Courthouse (Illinois), Tuscola, Illinois
- Douglas County Courthouse (Kansas), Lawrence, Kansas
- Douglas County Courthouse (Minnesota), Alexandria, Minnesota, listed on the National Register of Historic Places
- Douglas County Courthouse (Nebraska), Omaha, Nebraska
- Douglas County Courthouse (Nevada), Minden, Nevada
- Douglas County Courthouse (South Dakota), Armour, South Dakota
- Douglas County Courthouse (Washington), Waterville, Washington
- Douglas County Courthouse (Wisconsin), Superior, Wisconsin
