= Austin Fire Department =

Fire department in Austin, Texas, US

Coordinates: 30°15′0″N 97°45′0″W

Operational area
- Country: United States
- State: Texas
- City: Austin

Agency overview
- Established: September 25, 1859; 167 years ago
- Annual calls: 109,280 (2022)
- Employees: 1,257 (2022)
- Annual budget: $219M (2022)
- Staffing: Career
- Fire chief: Thomas Vocke (interim)
- EMS level: BLS
- IAFF: 975

Facilities and equipment
- Battalions: 8 Battalions
- Stations: 53 Fire Stations
- Engines: 47 Engine Companies
- Trucks: 8 Truck Companies
- Quints: 5 Quint Companies
- Rescues: 4 Rescue Companies
- Tenders: 2 Tenders
- USAR: 1 Urban Search and Rescue Unit
- Airport crash: 4 Crash Trucks
- Rescue boats: 5 Rescue Boats

Website
- Official website
- IAFF official

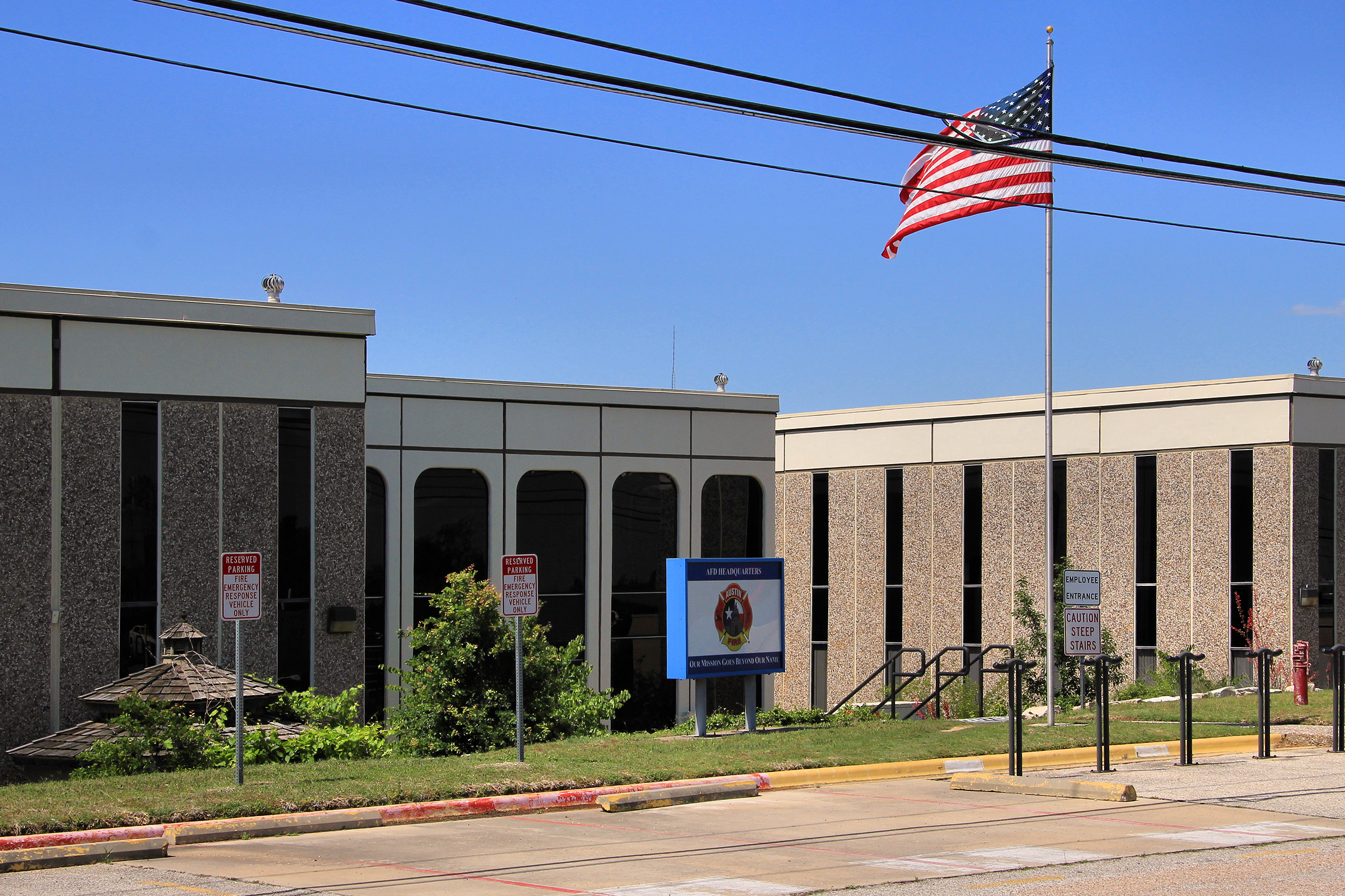
Headquarters

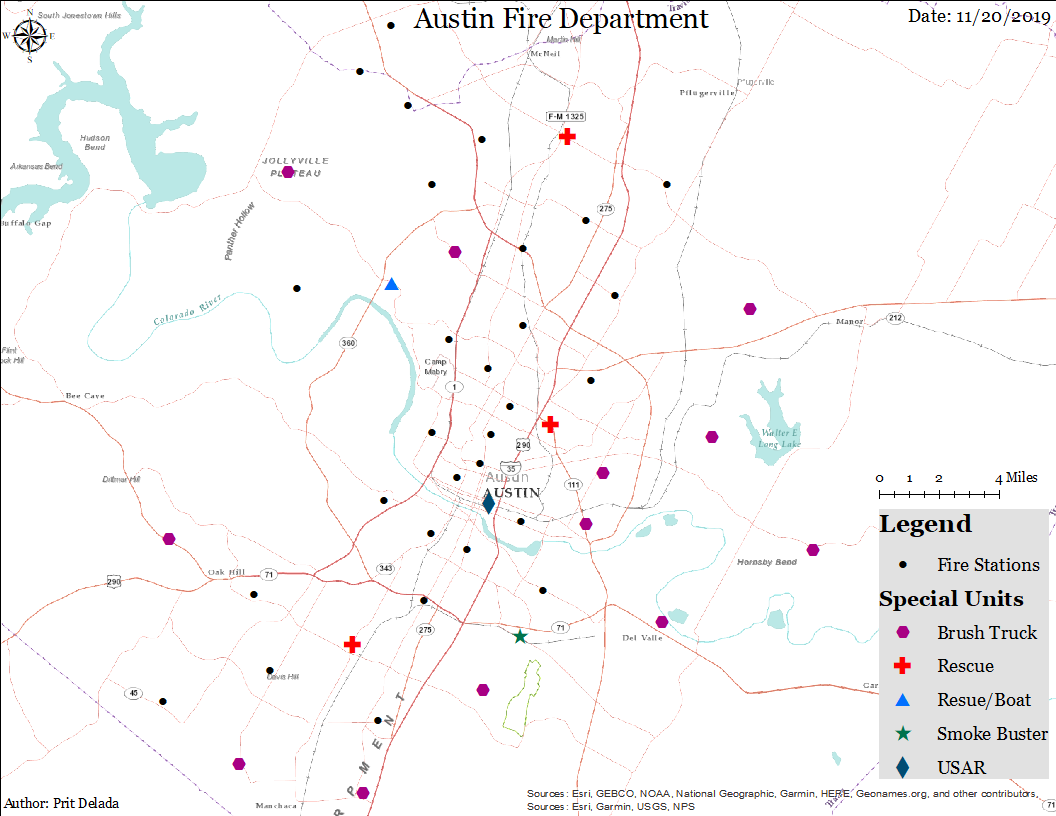
Fire station locations of the Austin Fire Department

The Austin Fire Department provides fire protection and first-response emergency medical services to the city of Austin, Texas, United States. The Austin Fire Department is the fourth largest fire department (by number of personnel) in the state of Texas. In total, the department is responsible for an area of 272 square miles (700 km^{2}) and services a population of 885,400 (2013 estimate), the 11^{th} largest city by population in the United States.

== History ==
The Austin Fire Department was started in 1841 as a seven-man fire protection group was sanctioned by the city council. It was not until 1858 that the city would have a properly organized, skilled and equipped department.

== Early Fire Protection and the Volunteer Era (1841–1915) ==
Austin's earliest organized fire protection efforts began in 1841, when a small group of seven individuals attempted to provide basic fire protection to the developing community. These early firefighters operated without the specialized equipment, training, or infrastructure associated with modern firefighting. Fire suppression relied heavily on manual labor, basic tools, and available water sources.

The establishment of Austin's first formal fire company in 1858 marked an important step toward organized fire protection. Like many American cities during this period, Austin relied on volunteer firefighters who responded to emergencies while maintaining other occupations. Although these volunteers provided an essential public service, their effectiveness was limited by available personnel, equipment, and funding.

As Austin expanded, the demand for reliable fire protection increased. The introduction of steam-powered fire engines, municipal water distribution systems, and fire hydrants improved the department's ability to control fires. However, these improvements required significant public investment.

One of the most significant events during this period was the destruction of the Texas State Capitol by fire in 1881. The incident demonstrated the limitations of the city's firefighting capabilities, particularly the availability of water and equipment necessary to control a large structural fire.

The Capitol fire illustrated an important lesson in public administration: emergency services must be adequately funded and developed before a major disaster occurs. The cost of maintaining fire protection infrastructure must be weighed against the potentially devastating financial and social consequences of inadequate emergency response capabilities.

== Transition to a Professional Fire Department (1916–1940) ==
The transition from volunteer firefighters to a fully paid department in 1916 represented one of the most significant organizational changes in AFD's history. Austin voters approved the change, and the department initially employed 27 paid firefighters.

Professionalization improved the reliability and consistency of emergency response. Unlike a volunteer system, a paid department could maintain dedicated personnel, establish standardized training requirements, and provide continuous staffing at fire stations.

This period also brought substantial technological improvements. Horse-drawn equipment was gradually replaced by motorized fire apparatus, improving response times and expanding the geographic area firefighters could effectively protect.

Improvements in alarm systems, radio communications, and fire station infrastructure further increased the department's operational capabilities. By 1938, AFD had grown to 166 personnel, reflecting both Austin's population growth and the increasing demand for professional emergency services.

The transition also changed how the city managed fire protection. Staffing, equipment replacement, employee compensation, training, and station maintenance became recurring government expenditures requiring long-term financial planning.

Rather than relying primarily on volunteers and community contributions, fire protection became a permanent municipal responsibility supported through public funding.

== Firefighter Benefits, Labor Relations, and Department Growth (1941–1979) ==
The middle of the twentieth century brought significant improvements in firefighter employment conditions, organizational structure, and professional standards.

In 1941, Austin firefighters became part of a retirement system, providing greater long-term financial security. Civil Service protections followed in 1948, helping establish more consistent employment practices and personnel management standards.

The development of organized labor, including the International Association of Fire Fighters Local 975, provided firefighters with a collective voice regarding wages, benefits, staffing, and working conditions.

These changes were important because firefighting had become a long-term professional career rather than primarily a volunteer public service. Recruitment, retention, retirement security, and employee protections became increasingly important considerations for department leadership and municipal government.

This period also included milestones in workforce diversity. The department hired its first Black firefighters in 1952, its first Hispanic firefighter in 1963, and its first female firefighter in 1976. These developments reflected broader changes in American society and the gradual expansion of employment opportunities within public safety organizations.

Another important advancement occurred in 1972, when firefighters began receiving Emergency Medical Technician training.

The addition of emergency medical services marked a fundamental expansion of the department's mission. Firefighters were increasingly expected to respond not only to fires but also to medical emergencies, vehicle accidents, and other incidents requiring immediate assistance.

This expanded mission required additional training, equipment, certifications, and financial resources, further increasing the complexity of managing a professional fire department.

== Expansion of Emergency Response and Specialized Rescue (1980–2000) ==
The 1980s represented another important period of development as AFD began expanding its capabilities beyond traditional structural firefighting.

One of the most significant incidents was the Memorial Day flood of 1981. Severe flooding throughout Austin resulted in widespread destruction, loss of life, and numerous emergency rescues. The incident exposed limitations in the department's ability to respond to large-scale flooding and water-related emergencies.

In response, AFD expanded its specialized rescue capabilities, including swiftwater rescue training and the development of a dive rescue team. These improvements demonstrated how major emergencies can influence operational priorities and lead to permanent organizational changes.

The department also continued improving its emergency communications, apparatus, and firefighter training. As Austin's population increased and development expanded into new areas, the department faced greater demands for emergency response coverage.

This period demonstrated that fire departments must continually evaluate emerging risks within their communities. Urban development, transportation infrastructure, flooding hazards, and increasing emergency call volumes all influence the resources required to provide effective emergency services.

The expansion of specialized rescue operations also created additional financial responsibilities. Specialized equipment, technical training, and maintaining personnel proficiency required funding beyond traditional firefighting operations.

== Modernization and Expanded Responsibilities (2000–Present) ==
As Austin continued to experience substantial population growth, AFD evolved into a modern emergency response organization responsible for a broad range of incidents.

Modern firefighting requires personnel to possess knowledge and skills extending well beyond fire suppression. Firefighters respond to emergency medical incidents, hazardous materials emergencies, technical rescues, vehicle collisions, and natural disasters.

The department's modernization has included improvements in protective equipment, communications, incident management, apparatus capabilities, and firefighter training.

An increasingly important consideration has been firefighter health and safety. Modern fire service operations emphasize occupational safety, physical fitness, respiratory protection, and reducing exposure to hazardous environments.

The department's growth also reflects the importance of long-term strategic planning. As communities expand, fire departments must evaluate station locations, response times, apparatus needs, staffing levels, and future development.

These decisions require cooperation between fire department leadership, elected officials, city administrators, and the community.

== Stations and Apparatus ==
Fire Station Number	Address	Engine Company	Ladder Company	Command Officer	Rescue Company	Special Units
1	401 E. 5th St	Engine 1 Engine 13	Ladder 1	Command 7 (Shift Commander)		
2	506 W. MLK Blvd	Engine 2		Battalion Chief 1		
3	201 W. 30th St	Engine 3	Quint 3			
4	1000 Blanco St	Engine 4				
5	1201 Webberville Rd	Engine 5				
6	1705 S. Congress Ave	Engine 6				
7	201 Chicon St	Engine 7				Squad 91
8	8989 Research Blvd	Engine 8	Ladder 8	Battalion Chief 3		
9	4301 Speedway	Engine 9				
10	3009 Windsor Rd	Engine 10				
11	1611 Kinney Ave	Engine 11				
12	2109 Hancock Dr	Engine 12				
14	4305 Airport Blvd	Engine 14		Battalion Chief 6	Rescue 14	Hazmat 1, Hazmat 2, CBRNE Lab, Spill 14, Hazmat 14, Boat 14
15	829 Airport Blvd	Engine 15				
16	7000 Reese Ln	Engine 16				
17	4128 S. 1st St	Engine 17	Ladder 17	Battalion Chief 4		
18	6311 Berkman Dr	Engine 18	Ladder 18			
19	5211 Balcones Dr		Quint 19			
20	6601 Manchaca Rd	Engine 20			Rescue 20	Boat 20
21	4201 Spicewood Springs Rd	Engine 21				
22	5309 E. Riverside Dr	Engine 22	Ladder 22			
23	1330 E. Rundberg Ln	Engine 23		Battalion Chef 7		
24	5811 Nuckols Crossing Rd	Engine 24				Squad 24
25	5228 Duval Rd	Engine 25				
26	6702 Wentworth Dr	Engine 26				Squad 26, Boat 26
27	5401 McCarty Ln	Engine 27				Safety Officer 1
28	2410 W. Parmer Ln	Engine 28			Rescue 28	Boat 28
29	3625 Davis Ln	Engine 29				Squad 98
30	1021 W. Braker Ln	Engine 30				Squad 93
31	5507 Ranch Rd 2222	Engine 31			Rescue 31	Boat 31, Hazmat 31
32	2804 Montebello Rd	Engine 32				Brush Truck 32
33	9409 Bluegrass Dr	Engine 33				
34	10041 Lake Creek Pkwy		Quint 34	Battalion Chief 2		Squad 92
35	5500 Burleson Rd	Engine 35				Squad 94, Field Training Officer 1, Smoke Buster 35
36	400 Ralph Ablanedo Dr	Engine 36	Truck 36			
37	8660 W. SH 71	Engine 37				Brush Truck 37
38	10111 Anderson Mill Rd	Engine 38				
39	7701 River Place Blvd	Engine 39				
40	12711 Harrisglenn Blvd	Engine 40	Ladder 40			Brush Truck 40, Brush Truck 80
41	11205 Harris Branch Pkwy	Engine 41				Brush Truck 41
42	2434 Cardinal Lp	Engine 42	Ladder 42	Battalion Chief 5		Brush Truck 42, Brush Truck 82
43	11401 Escarpment Blvd	Engine 43				
44	11612 Four Iron Dr		Ladder 44			
45	9421 Spectrum Blvd	Engine 45				
46	12010 Brodie Ln	Engine 46				
47	4200 City Park Rd	Engine 47				
48	14312 Hunters Bend Rd	Engine 48				Squad 48
49	11112 Old San Antonio Rd	Engine 49				Brush Truck 49
50	7019 Elroy Rd	Engine 50				Squad 50
51	5410 W. US Hwy 290		Quint 51	Battalion Chief 8		
52	4601 Westlake Dr	Engine 52				Brush Truck 52, Tender 52
53	9400 Capital View Dr	Engine 53				Squad 53, Tender 99
54	9804 N FM 620	Engine 54				Brush Truck 54
Austin–Bergstrom Airport				ARFF 1, ARFF 2		ARFF 3, ARFF 4, ARFF 5, ARFF 6, ARFF 10, ARFF 20, ARFF 21

=== Per the Travis County Regional Naming Policy ===
- Truck - an aerial apparatus with platform regardless of any other capability
- Quint - an aerial apparatus with a pump unless it also has a platform
- Ladder - an aerial apparatus with a straight stick and no pump

=== Airport Apparatus ===
- ARFF 1 - Airport Battalion Chief
- ARFF 2 - Airport Captain
- ARFF 3, 4, 6 - Crash Apparatus
- ARFF 5 - Ramp Apparatus
- ARFF 10 - Spare Ramp Apparatus
- ARFF 20 & 21 - Spare Crash Apparatus

== AFD Ranks ==
- Austin Fire Chief
- Assistant Chief
- Division Chief
- Battalion Chief
- Fire Captain
- Lieutenant
- Fire Specialist (Driver)
- Firefighter
- Probationary Firefighter
- Cadet (Training Academy)

== See also ==
- Austin Central Fire Station 1
- Buford Tower
