= Roy White (disambiguation) =

Roy White may refer to:

- Roy White (born 1943), American baseball player
- Roy White (American football) (1900–1993), American football player
- Roy White (rugby union) (1917–1980), New Zealand rugby union player
- J. Roy White (1907–1985), American architect
