= Ludwig O. Solberg =

American architect

Ludwig O. Solberg (born 1886) was an architect based in Wenatchee, Washington.

He was born November 2, 1886, in Minneapolis, Minnesota. He attended schools in Spokane and then Washington State College in Pullman, Washington during 1907–08 but apparently did not graduate. His further education and training is unclear, but he received an architectural license from the State of Washington by reciprocity on December 27, 1922. He served in World War I, including as a first lieutenant in the quartermaster corps in France. He was later an active member of the American Legion.

He worked for a time in the architectural firm of Morrison & Stimson in Wenatchee and is given credit with them for the Chelan County Courthouse (1924). He died November 26, 1967.

One of his works is listed on the National Register of Historic Places (NRHP), for its architecture. This is the Wenatchee Fire Station No. 1 (1929), at 136 S. Chelan Ave., Wenatchee, WA. Includes Beaux Arts styling.

Other works (in Wenatchee unless otherwise noted) are:

- Wenatchee Police Station (1931), Wenatchee
- Elks Temple (1922)
- Warren Motor Building (1921)
- First Federal Savings and Loan Building (1926)
- Chelan County Shop/Annex
- Davis (now Hamilton) Warehouse (1920 & 1927)
- Wenatchee High School
- H. B. Ellison Jr. High School
- Columbia Elementary
- Stevens School
- Lincoln Elementary School
- District 88 Building
- Lewis and Clark Elementary
- The Church of the Brethren (1928), 535 Okanogan St.
- Wells and Wade Building (remodel)
- Wenatchee Produce Co. Building (1918)
- Salvation Army Building (1928)
- J.C. Penney's Store (1926)
- Wenatchee's Memorial Hall
- Dryden Elementary, Dryden, Washington
- Chelan High School, Chelan, Washington
- Chelan Masonic Temple, Chelan, Washington
- Douglas County Courthouse (Waterville, Washington). (However the 1905 courthouse there is credited, at least mainly to architect Newton C. Gauntt, per its NRHP nomination, so perhaps Solberg contributed to the design without being the principal, or perhaps he designed a renovation.)
- Bridgeport Elementary, Bridgeport, Washington
- Chelan Ford Motor Co. Building, Chelan, Washington
- Cashmere City Hall, Cashmere, Washington
- Ludington Building (Wenatchee, Washington)
- Cascadian Fruit Storage Building
- Numerous apple packing warehouses in Cashmere, Chelan, Dryden and Wenatchee
- D.L. Woodruff House (remodel)
- Vinton & Ada McBride House (1928)
- Delos & Gretta Shiner House (c.1925)
- Solberg Apartments
- Claude Steward House
- Man/in Stewart House
- Wilder Jones House (1931)
- T.L. Ross House (1931)
- Harry & Marjorie Miller House (c.1925)
- Burt and Irene Williams House (1929)
- Nathan and Sadie Neubauer House (1921)
