= Austin Central Fire Station 1 =

- Austin Central Fire Station #1
- U.S. National Register of Historic Places
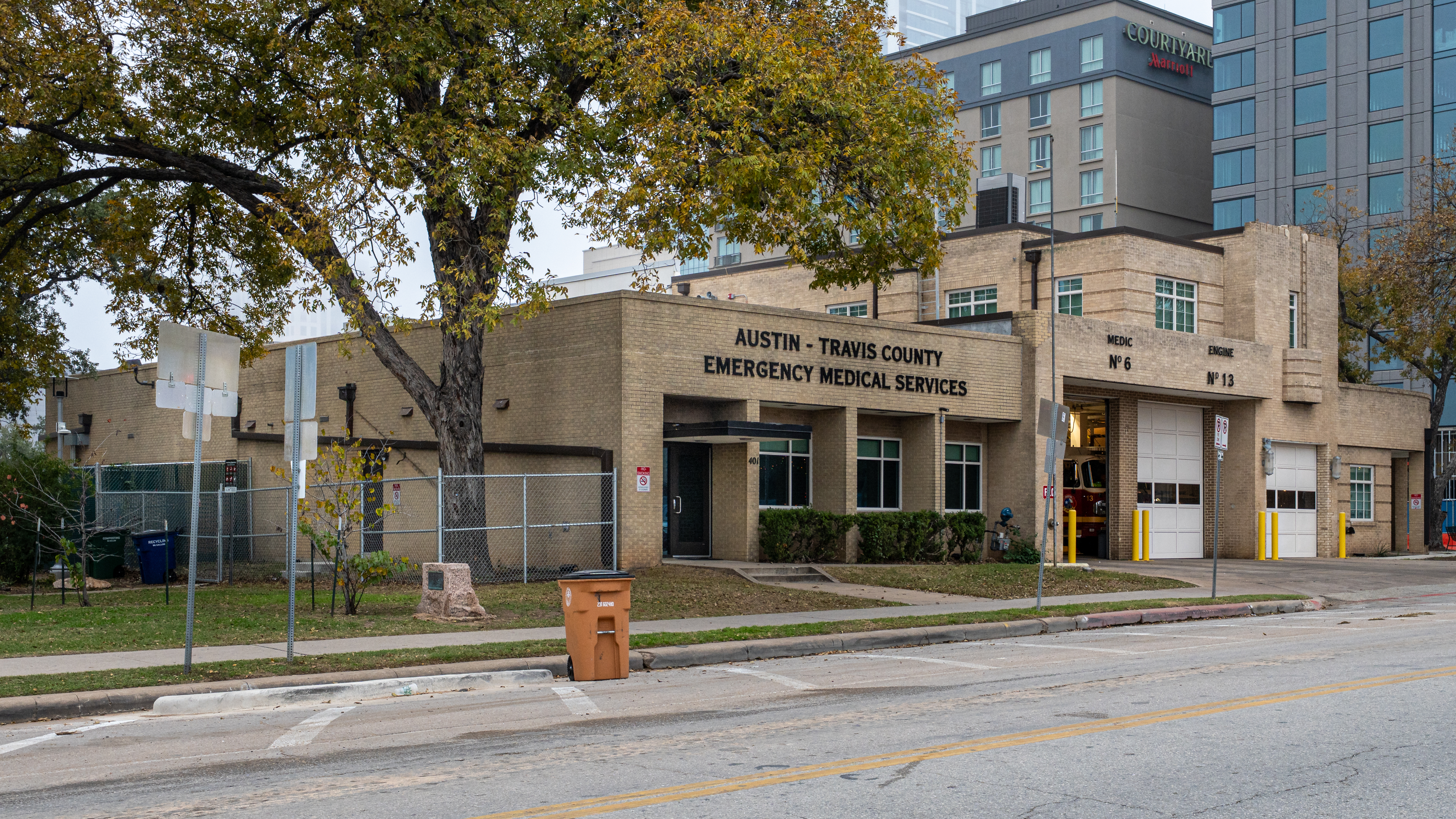
- Austin Central Fire Station 1

- Location within Texas Location within the United States
- Location: 401 E Fifth St, Austin, Texas
- Coordinates: 30°15′57″N 97°44′23″W
- Built: 1938
- Architect: Edwin C. Kreisle; Max Brooks
- Architectural style: Moderne
- NRHP reference No.: 00000454
- Added to NRHP: May 5, 2000

Austin Central Fire Station 1, is a fire station at 401 East Fifth Street in Downtown Austin, Texas, United States. It is a part of the Austin Fire Department.

The Austin Fire Museum was previously located in the historic fire station but is being relocated. The museum's exhibits included firefighting equipment, uniforms, photographs and memorabilia from firefighters of Austin, including Texas' first African American firefighters. The museum is operated by the Austin Fire Museum Hook and Ladder Society.

The building was added to the National Register of Historic Places on May 5, 2000.
