= Lyndon B. Johnson State Park and Historic Site =

State park in Texas, United States

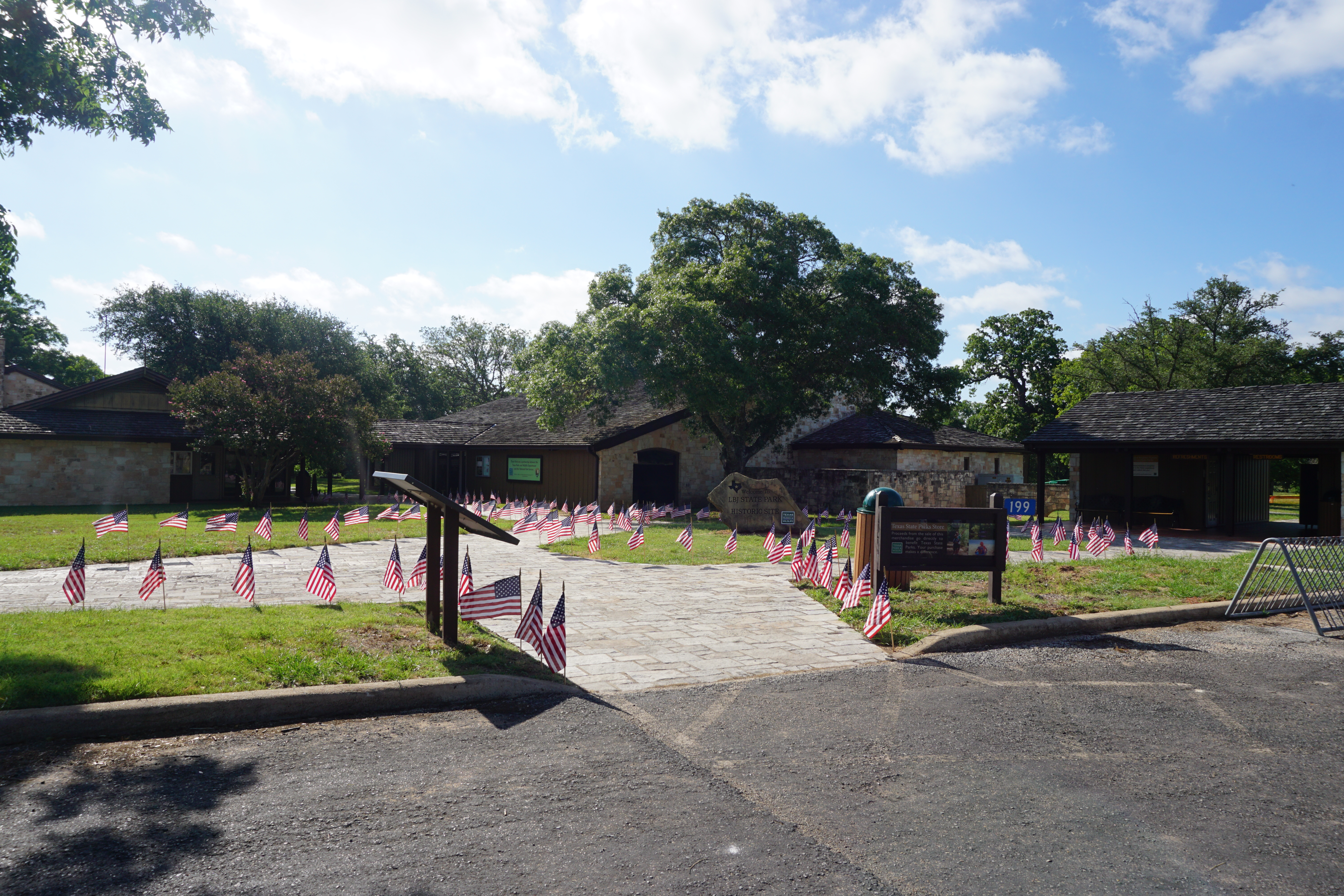
- Lyndon B. Johnson State Park and Historic Site

- Location within Texas Location within the United States
- Location: Gillespie County, Texas
- Nearest city: Stonewall
- Coordinates: 30°14′15″N 98°37′34″W
- Area: 732.75 acres (297 ha)
- Established: 1965
- Named for: Lyndon B. Johnson
- Visitors: 62,698 (in 2025)
- Governing body: Texas Parks and Wildlife Department
- Website: Official site

Lyndon B. Johnson State Park and Historic Site is a 732.75 acres (297 ha) state park located along the Pedernales River in Gillespie County, Texas, United States west of Johnson City and east of Fredericksburg. The state created the park with donated land to honor Lyndon B. Johnson as a "national and world leader." The park opened to the public in 1970 and is managed by the Texas Parks and Wildlife Department.

== History ==
Friends of Johnson raised the money to buy the land across the Pedernales River from Johnson's Ranch (now part of the Lyndon B. Johnson National Historical Park) for the park and donated the land to the State of Texas in 1965. The master plan for the park was developed by Austin-area architect J. Roy White, a personal friend of the Johnson family who had worked extensively on the Johnson Ranch. White also designed the park's visitor center. The 269-acre (109 ha) park was officially dedicated in August, 1970, in a ceremony attended by the Johnson family and a host of dignitaries. Since the dedication, the park has been expanded to approximately 732.75 acres (297 ha).

== Features ==
The park has a large visitor center complex with an interpretive center about Johnson's life. Tours of the Lyndon B. Johnson National Historical Park are by permit only and are by self-guided driving tour departing from the state park's visitor center.

The park offers recreational facilities for swimming, tennis and baseball. Fishing is allowed in the Pedernales River and there is a nature trail for hiking. The park maintains small herds of Texas Longhorn cattle and American bison.

=== Sauer-Beckmann Farmstead ===
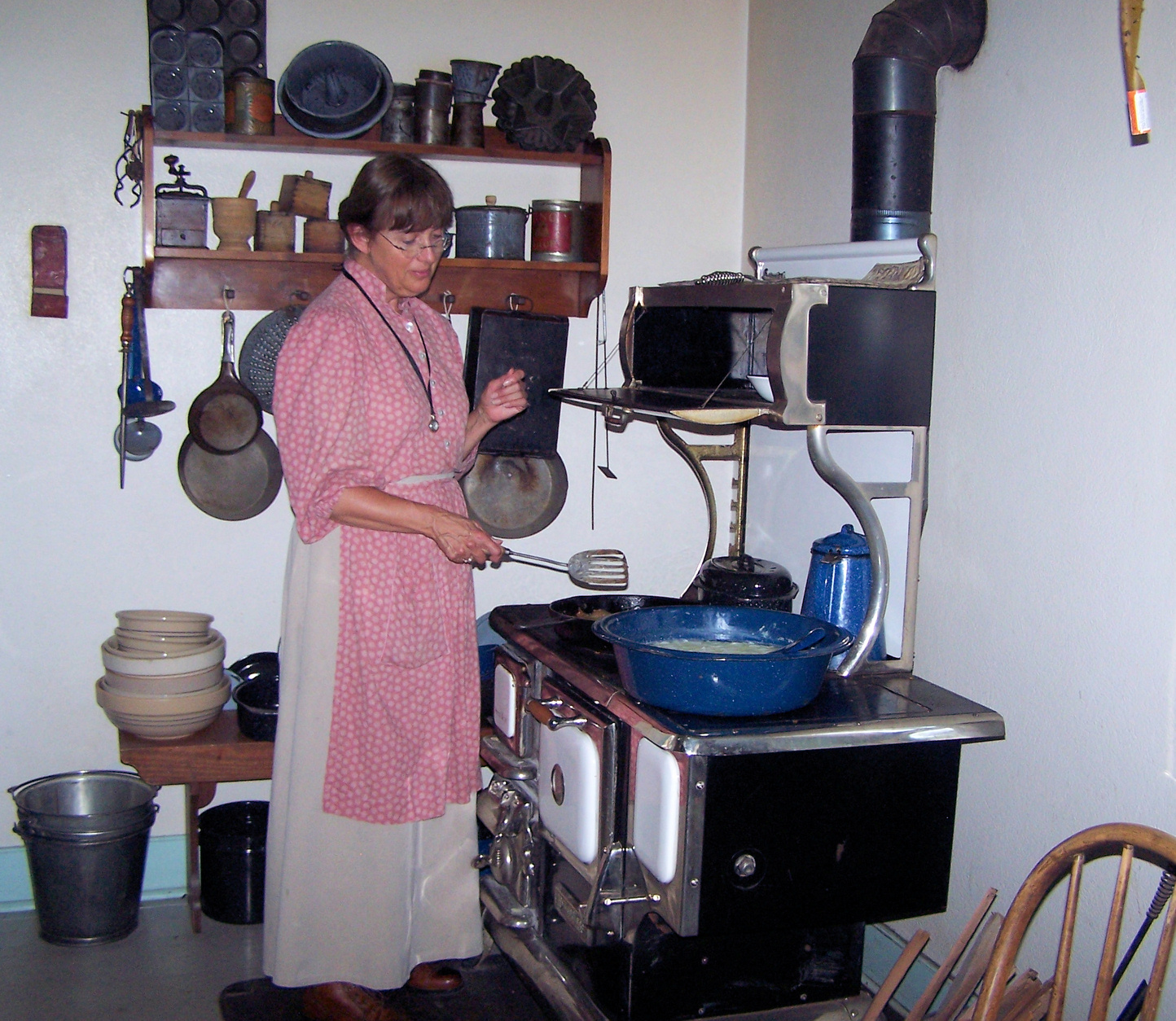
A park interpreter demonstrates a typical rural kitchen of 1918 at the Sauer-Beckmann Farmstead.

The Sauer-Beckmann Farmstead was settled by John Sauer and his family in the late 19th century and then by Herman Beckmann and his sons in the early 20th century. The Sauer-Beckmann Farmstead is a living history farm that presents rural Texas life as it was around 1918. The park interpreters wear period clothing and perform the daily routine of life using period tools and techniques.

== Nature ==
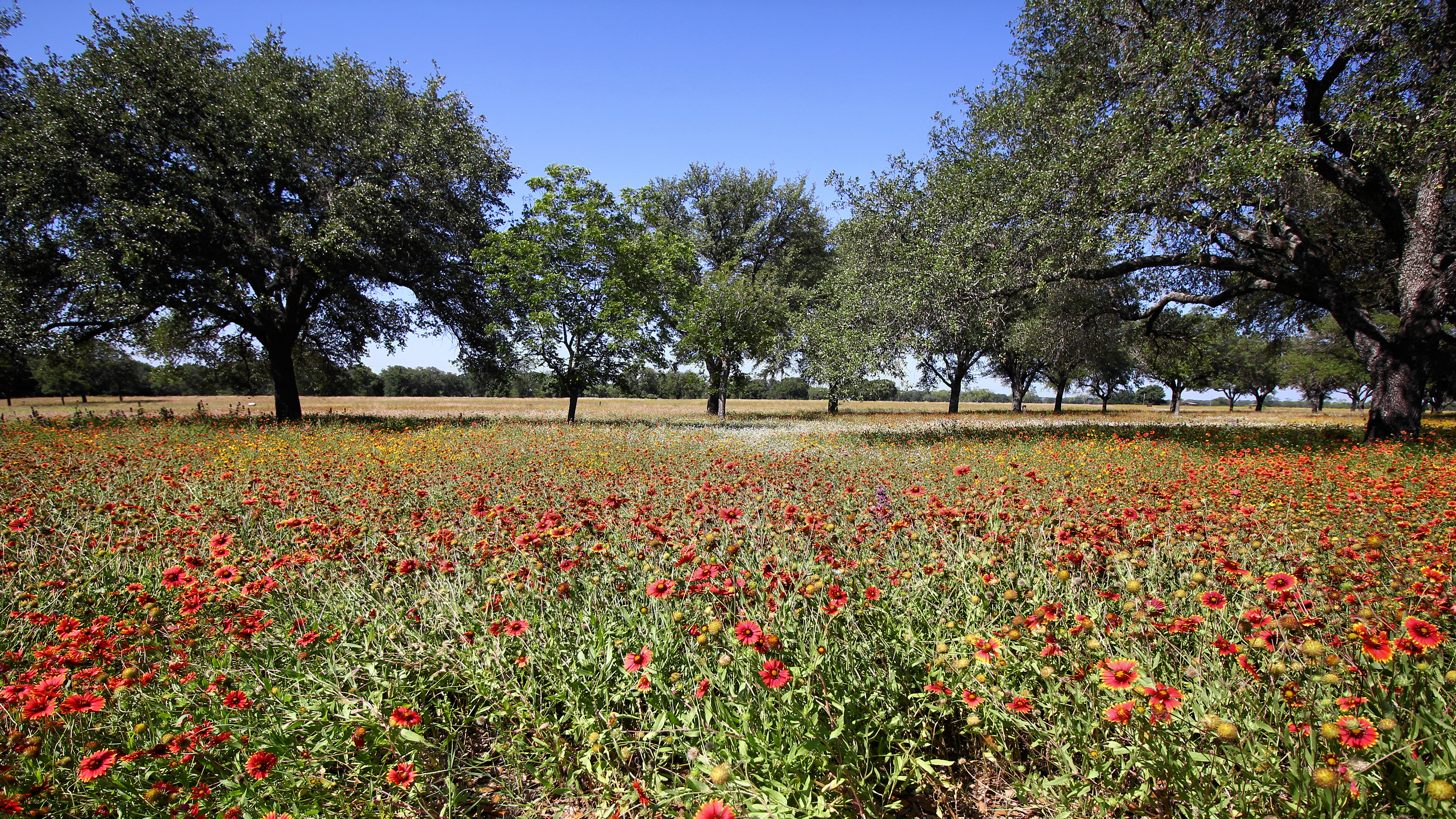
Summer wildflowers in the park.

=== Animals ===
White-tailed deer, chital, wild turkey and eastern fox squirrel are often spotted within the park.

=== Plants ===
The park abounds with wildflowers during the spring and summer including Texas bluebonnets, pink evening primrose, winecup and Indian blankets. Trees documented in the park include southern catalpa, cedar elm, Mexican buckeye, live oak, ashe juniper and post oak.

== See also ==
- List of Texas state parks
- Presidential memorials in the United States
