= Buford Tower =

Historic structure in Austin, Texas, U.S.

- Austin Fire Drill Tower
- U.S. National Register of Historic Places
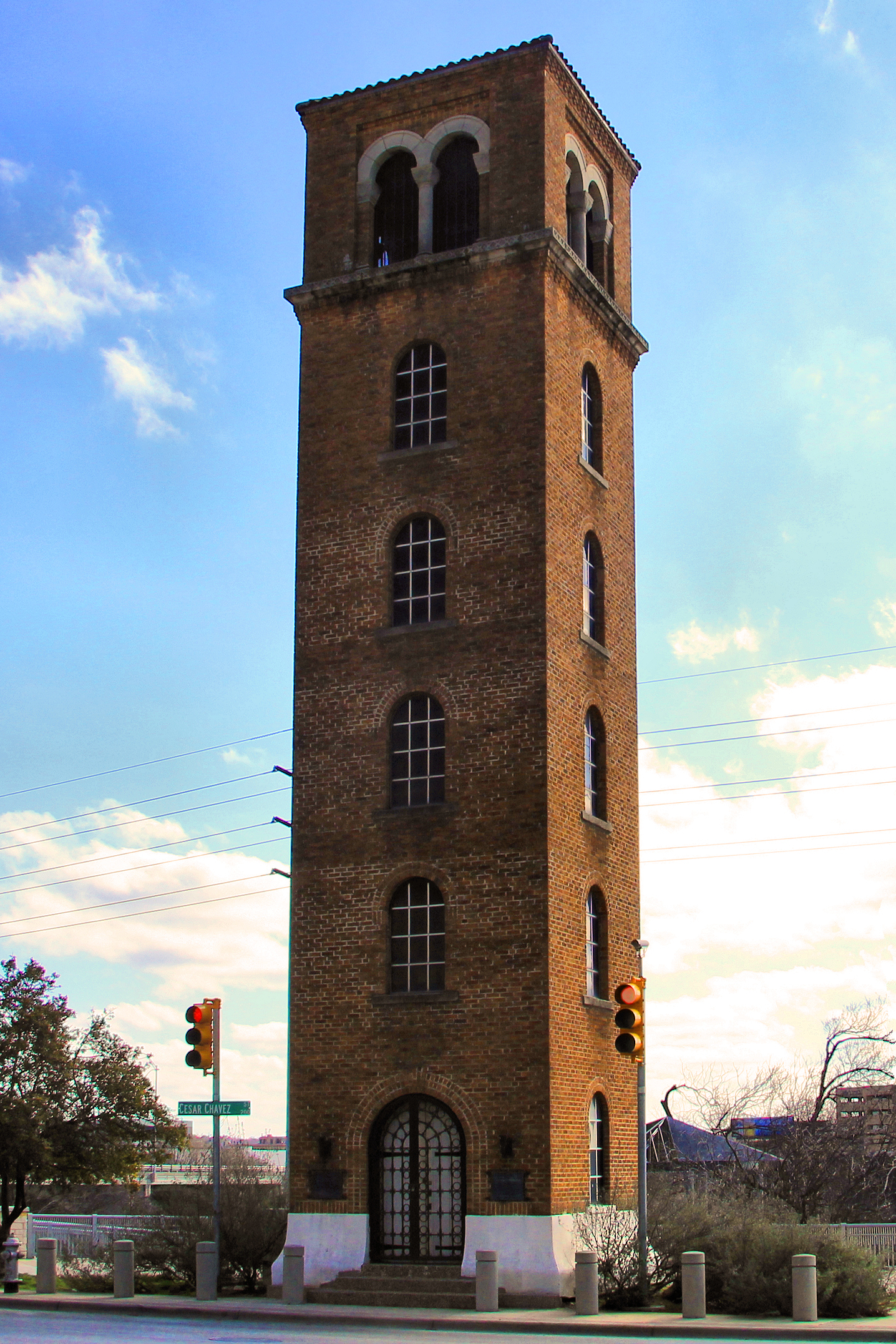
- Viewed from the north in 2014

- Location within Texas Location within the United States
- Location: 201 W. Cesar Chavez St., Austin, Texas, U.S.
- Coordinates: 30.2636°N 97.7459°W
- Area: Less than 1 acre (0.40 ha)
- Built: 1930
- Architects: Hugo Kuehne; J. Roy White
- Architectural style: Italianate
- NRHP reference No.: 16000720
- Added to NRHP: October 11, 2016

Buford Tower (formerly the Austin Fire Drill Tower) is a tower standing along the north shore of Lady Bird Lake in downtown Austin, Texas, United States. The structure was originally built in 1930 as a drill tower for the Austin Fire Department, but it now serves as a bell tower and landmark. Named after fire department Captain James L. Buford, the structure has been listed on the National Register of Historic Places since 2016.

== History ==
Austin first established a professional fire department in 1916, creating a need for a drill tower where the firefighters could train. On December 26, 1929, City Council authorized construction of a fire drill tower on a parcel of land along the Colorado River downtown, where the river could provide water for testing fire hoses and extinguishing training fires. The tower was built in 1930 at a cost of $6,200 (equivalent to $119,000 in 2025), and it immediately began to be burned and flooded regularly during training exercises and the testing of equipment. It also served as a backdrop for fire department photographs, social events, and public firefighting demonstrations.

As decades passed, firefighting technology advanced, and Austin's buildings grew taller. In the 1960s, snorkel trucks gave the city's firefighters access to higher windows than could be reached with traditional ladders, and the tower's value as a training facility declined. At the same time, the growth of the city meant that the drill tower, originally built near the southern edge of town, was now crowded by tall modern buildings and heavy traffic, making the training fires a growing hazard to downtown. Finally, in 1974 the fire department opened a new training tower in southeast Austin, and the original Fire Drill Tower was closed.

=== Restoration and carillon ===
The tower stood unused and untended for years, and its unglazed windows allowed it to become infested with pigeons; eventually the city marked the structure for demolition. In 1978, however, Effie Kitchens (the widow of the tower's original builder) led a public campaign, together with the Austin chapter of the National Association of Women in Construction, to raise funds for the tower's restoration. The campaign raised $45,000, of which Kitchens personally contributed $30,000.

These funds allowed the tower's brick facade to be cleaned, its roof repaired, and its windows glazed to keep wildlife out. Decorative iron grillwork was added to the doors at ground level and to the highest level, where an electronic carillon bell system was installed, transforming the fire drill tower into a working bell tower. After the renovations were completed, on August 23, 1978 the tower was rededicated as Buford Tower, named after Austin Fire Department Captain James L. Buford, the first Austin firefighter to die in the line of duty. The bell system was named the Kitchens Memorial Chimes, after the tower's builder, Rex D. Kitchens.

Today, the bells chime the hours and play Christmas carols during the Christmas season. The tower has also become the site of the Austin Firefighters' Association's annual memorial service for first responders who lost their lives during the 9/11 attacks.

On April 1, 2021, a fire from a nearby homeless camp extended to the tower causing damage. The fire department ruled the cause of the fire "incendiary," or intentionally set, pending further investigation. The damage is estimated at $12,000.

== Architecture ==
Buford Tower is a freestanding six-story concrete tower clad with reddish-brown brick with limestone accents, 67 feet (20 m) tall with a 14-foot (4.3 m) square cross-section. Built in the style of an Italianate campanile, it features a low-pitched square hip roof and round-arched Romanesque Revival doors and windows. The tower was designed by local architect J. Roy White for the Austin-based Hugo Kuehne architecture firm; its construction contractor was local builder Rex D. Kitchens.

=== Exterior ===
At its base, the tower rests on a 4-foot (1.2 m) white concrete plinth. The entrance faces the street on the north side, with three concrete steps leading up to the arched doorway from street level. The doors are covered by black cast iron grillwork gates and flanked by a pair of cast iron light fixtures. On the first five floors, each face of the building is penetrated by one centered window (excepting the first floor, where the north face instead has the front doorway, and the south face is a solid brick wall). The windows are now glazed, though they were originally left open to facilitate airflow to the training fires. The doorway and all of the windows are topped by semicircular brick arches; the windows have concrete sills, matching the steps below the doorway.

Above the fifth level, the tower is wrapped by a stone cornice supported by brick corbels, separating the sixth floor from the lower levels. Each wall of the top level features a wider, double-arched opening set into a recessed rectangular bay; the round central column and the arches are of limestone, and square brick pilasters with limestone capitals frame the openings to the sides. The arches were originally open, but since the 1978 restoration they have been filled with metal mesh and cast iron grillwork. Above these openings, another ring of brick corbels supports the hipped red tile roof.

=== Interior ===
Inside, the ground level has a floor of pavers, white walls, and a flight of concrete steps leading to the second level. The second through fifth levels are all largely alike, with bare concrete floors and ceilings, and exposed brick walls; they connect to each other by a central steel staircase. The sixth level is accessed from the fifth by an attic ladder; it has the same concrete floor and brick walls as the lower levels, but a wooden plank ceiling hides the rafters supporting the roof. The top level houses the loudspeakers of the electronic carillon; the system's controls are below, on the second floor.

== See also ==
- National Register of Historic Places listings in Travis County, Texas
