= Drill tower =

Tower for training firefighters

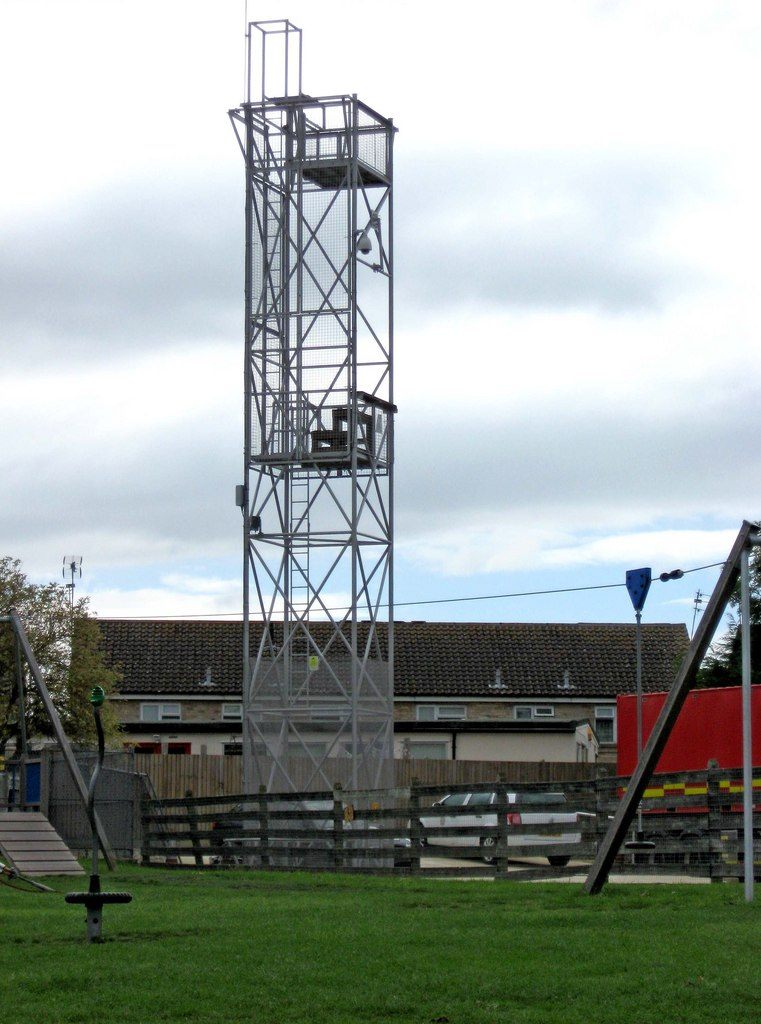
A drill tower in Cricklade, England

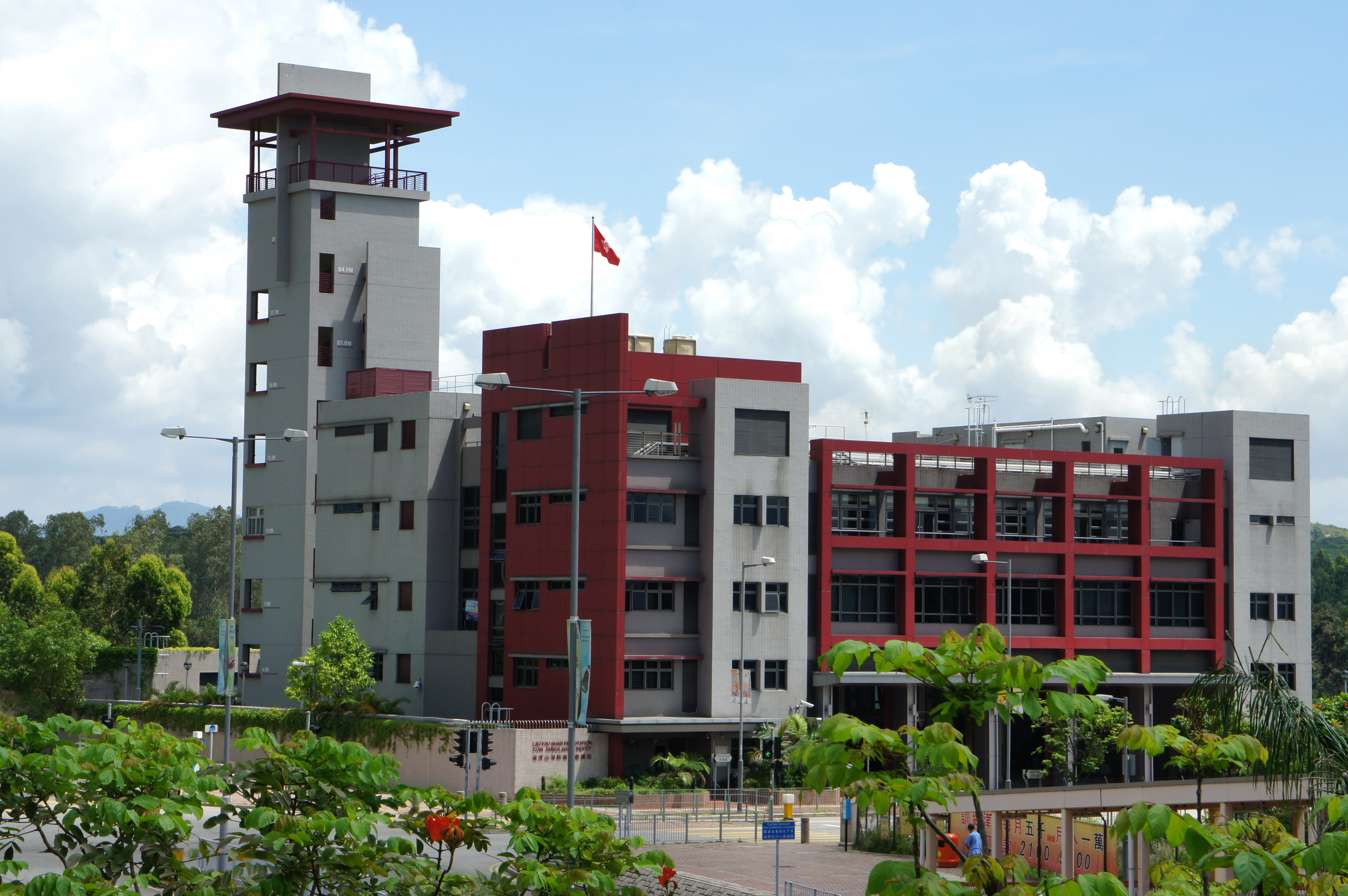
A drill tower (left) resembling high-rise buildings, next to Lau Fau Shan Fire Station in Lau Fau Shan, Hong Kong

A drill tower is a tower and training facility for firefighters. It is usually built within a fire station facility for routine exercises and training. The drill tower is typically a multi-level structure simulating high-rise buildings. Heights vary by location.

Towers can help firefighters deal with real-life situations, including running upstairs with heavy equipment, using rope and safety nets, and operating a fire engine in a confined space.

Towers are usually accessible only by stairs and ladders, but in Hong Kong, the one in Kai Tak Fire Station is built with a lift for disabled.

== See also ==
- Buford Tower
- Fire lookout tower
- Hose tower
