= Douglas County Courthouse (Georgia) =

Historic courthouse in Georgia, US

- U.S. National Register of Historic Places
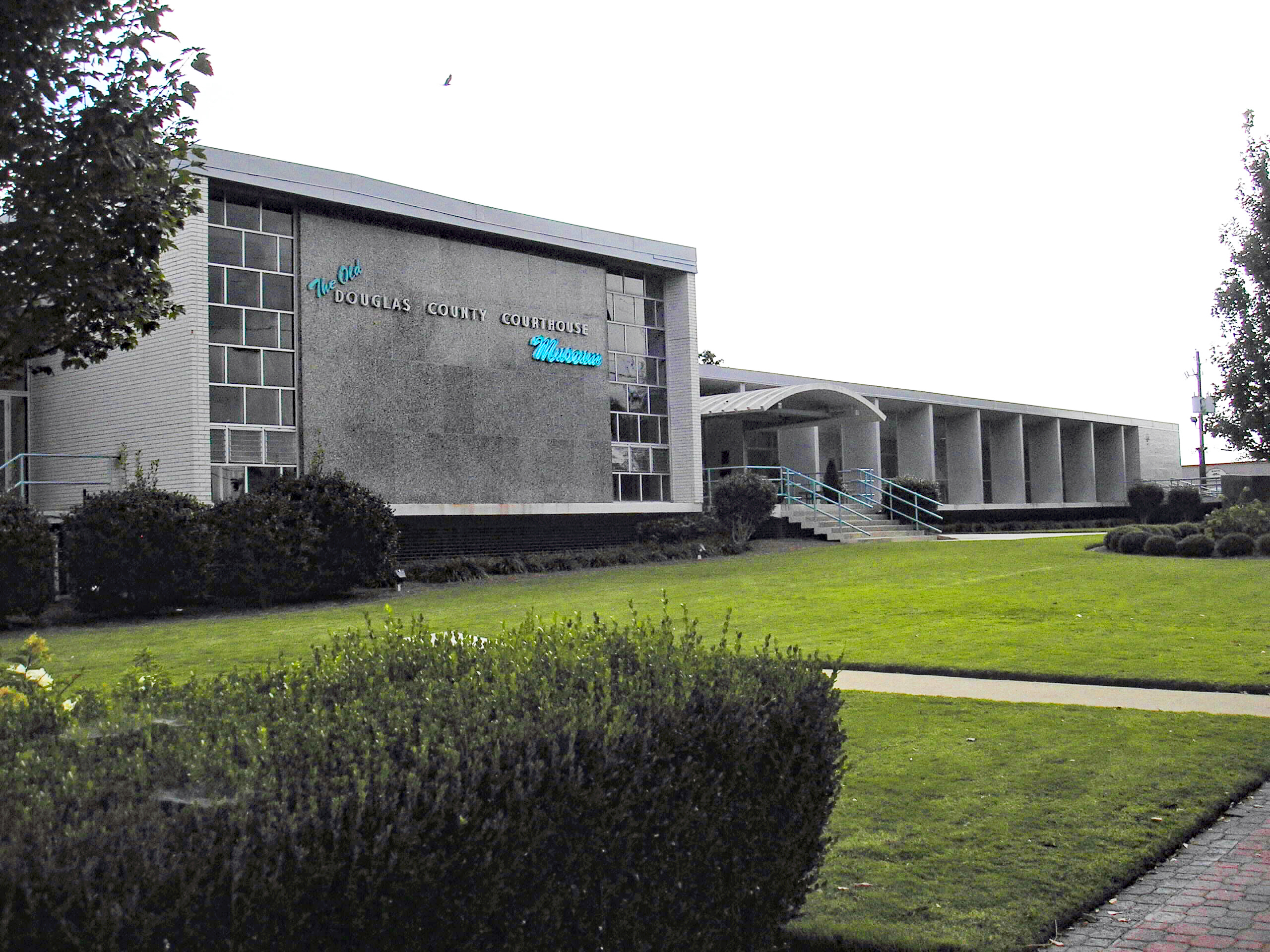

- Location within Georgia Location within the United States
- Location: Douglasville, Georgia
- Coordinates: 33°44′59″N 84°45′1″W
- Built: 1958
- Architect: Harry E. Roos, Jr.; McKown Construction Company
- Architectural style: International Style
- NRHP reference No.: 02001216
- Added to NRHP: October 24, 2002

Douglas County Courthouse is a historic courthouse at 6754 West Broad Street in Douglasville, Georgia, United States.

The courthouse was built in 1956, after the 1896 courthouse burned down. It was built where three prior courthouses originally stood. It was designed in the International Style by Harry E. Roos, Jr. of Southern Engineering.

In 1998, after the opening of the new courthouse, it was set for demolition. However, the local Tourism and History Commission was able to convince the county government to keep it. It became the Douglas County Museum of History and Art. On October 24, 2002, it was added to the U.S. National Register of Historic Places.

== Douglas County Museum of History and Art ==
Established in 1998, the Douglas County Museum of History and Art features rotating exhibits of mid-20th century history, reflecting the courthouse's era, and exhibits of local history. Themes include Native Americans, pioneer life, the American Civil War, the history of Douglasville, area veterans, black education, farm life and early medicine. The museum's special collections of American pop culture include lunchboxes, record players, Coca-Cola items and television lamps.

Beginning in 1998, the museum operated in the old courthouse under the auspices of the organization Old Courthouse Inc. The county terminated Old Courthouse Inc.'s lease in 2025. In 2026, the county closed the building for renovations. A county commissioner said they needed a new nonprofit organization to take over the museum's operations due to concerns they had with Old Courthouse Inc.'s operational plans and accounting practices.
