= Hose tower =

Structure for hanging hoses to dry in fire stations

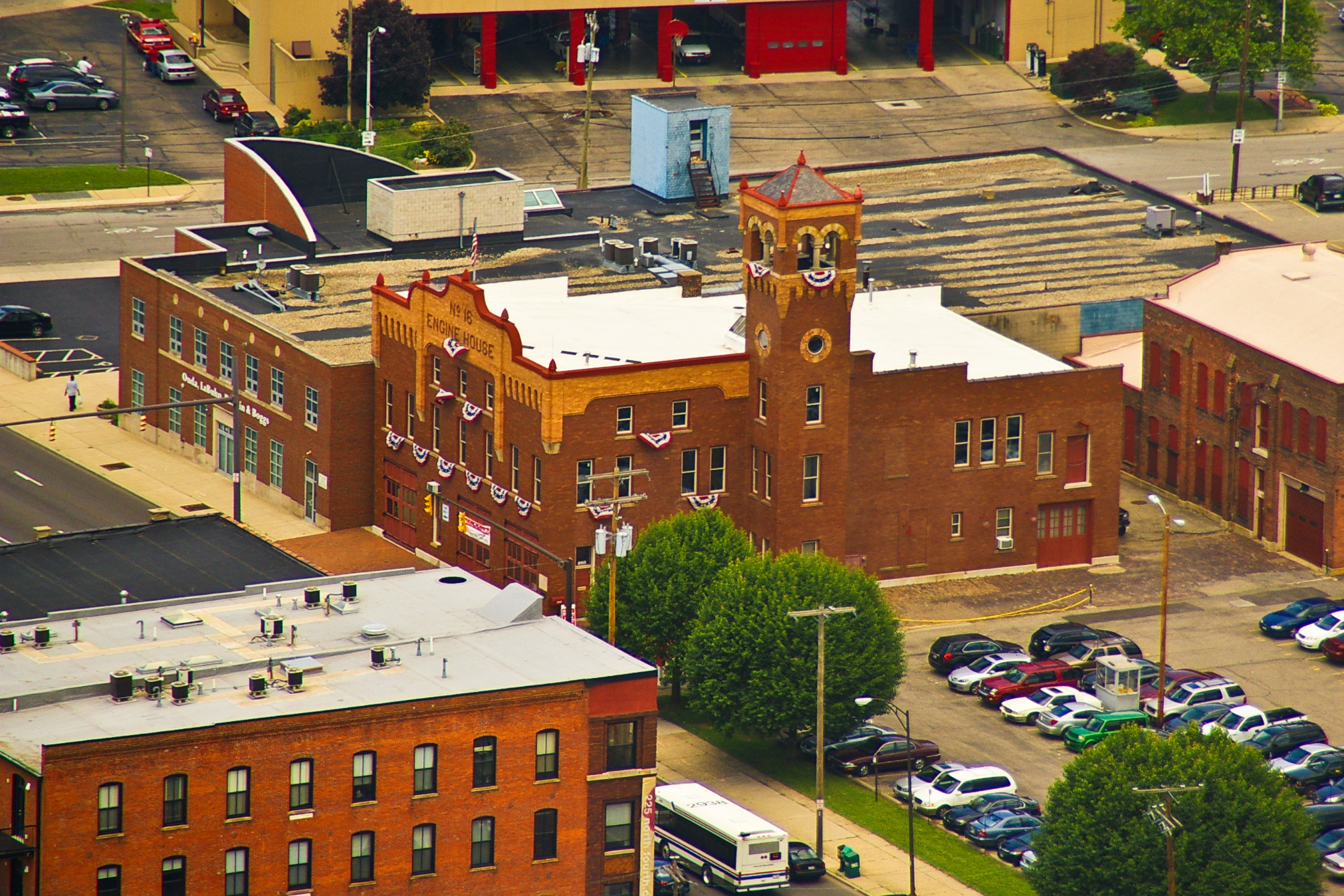
Hose tower at Engine House No. 16, present-day Central Ohio Fire Museum

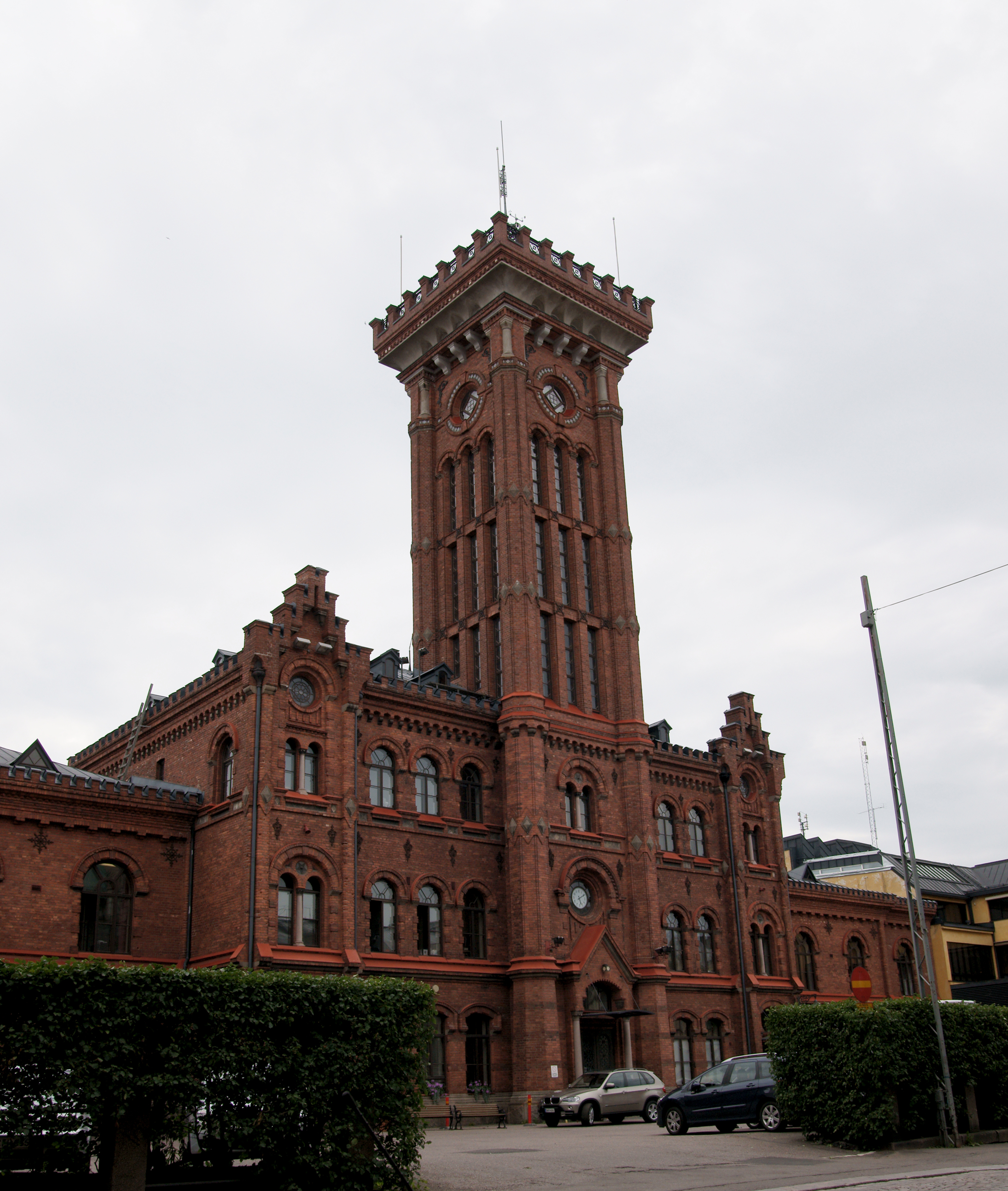
Hose tower of Erottaja's fire station in Helsinki, Finland

A hose tower is a structure constructed for hanging firehoses to dry. Hose towers have been features of some fire station designs in Canada, Germany, and the United States. The purpose of such towers was to hang and dry canvas hoses, slowing the deterioration caused if the hoses were not dried thoroughly. Fire stations can also have towers for other purposes: a clock tower or bell tower or drill tower for firemen to practice. In Australia, especially, some fire stations had watch towers for looking for smoke, presumably in relatively flat areas and in spread out low towns where an extra story or two of elevation provided for an extremely wide range of vision, perhaps 360 degrees. Before radio/telephone communications, in the U.S. and Australia and elsewhere, fire lookout towers were also sited on mountain tops or other remote locations with wide views, later, when radio/telephone communications were possible.

Hose towers are features of many fire stations, perhaps especially in the U.S.

A hose tower and annex building is a feature of a National Historic Landmark district in Greendale, Wisconsin.

In 2001, a campaign was undertaken to restore the only remaining hose tower in Oklahoma.

In 2016, a hose tower mounted on top of the city hall in Sainte-Anne-de-Bellevue, Quebec, was demolished after much public debate.

In Australia there are examples of fire-hose drying poles, where hoses are drawn by rope pulley up an outdoor pole, in lieu of an entire hose tower structure.

== See also ==
- Fire lookout tower
- Drill tower
- List of fire stations
