= J. Roy White =

American architect and artist

- Born: 1907; Crowley, Louisiana, U.S.
- Died: 1985 (aged 77–78); Austin, Texas, U.S.
- Education: University of Texas, Austin
- Occupations: Architect, artist
- Notable work: Buford Tower; Austin History Center; Lyndon B. Johnson Ranch

J. Roy White (1907–1985) was an American architect and artist known primarily for his architectural work in Austin, Texas and at the Lyndon B. Johnson Ranch.

== Life and career ==
White was born in 1907 in Crowley, Louisiana and moved with his family to Austin, Texas in 1924. He studied architecture at the University of Texas at Austin, graduating with a bachelor's degree in 1929 and joining the local architectural firm of Hugo Kuehne. White later worked for the City of Austin, building and renovating civic buildings, and in 1943 he moved to another firm, of which he eventually became a partner in 1965. He continued to work in architecture until shortly before his death in 1985.

== Architectural works ==
One of White's first professional designs was the Austin Fire Drill Tower (now known as Buford Tower), built in 1930 and today listed on the National Register of Historic Places. He was also the primary designer of the original Austin Public Library building (now the Austin History Center), built in 1933 and also listed on the NRHP. Other significant designs by White in Austin include work on the library and dormitories at Huston–Tillotson University, several Austin Independent School District schools, the caretaker's cottage and Doris Miller Auditorium at Rosewood Park, and various houses in Old West Austin. He also oversaw the 1944 remodeling of the historic chapel at Oakwood Cemetery and the expansion and restoration of St. David's Episcopal Church downtown.

=== Lyndon B. Johnson Ranch ===
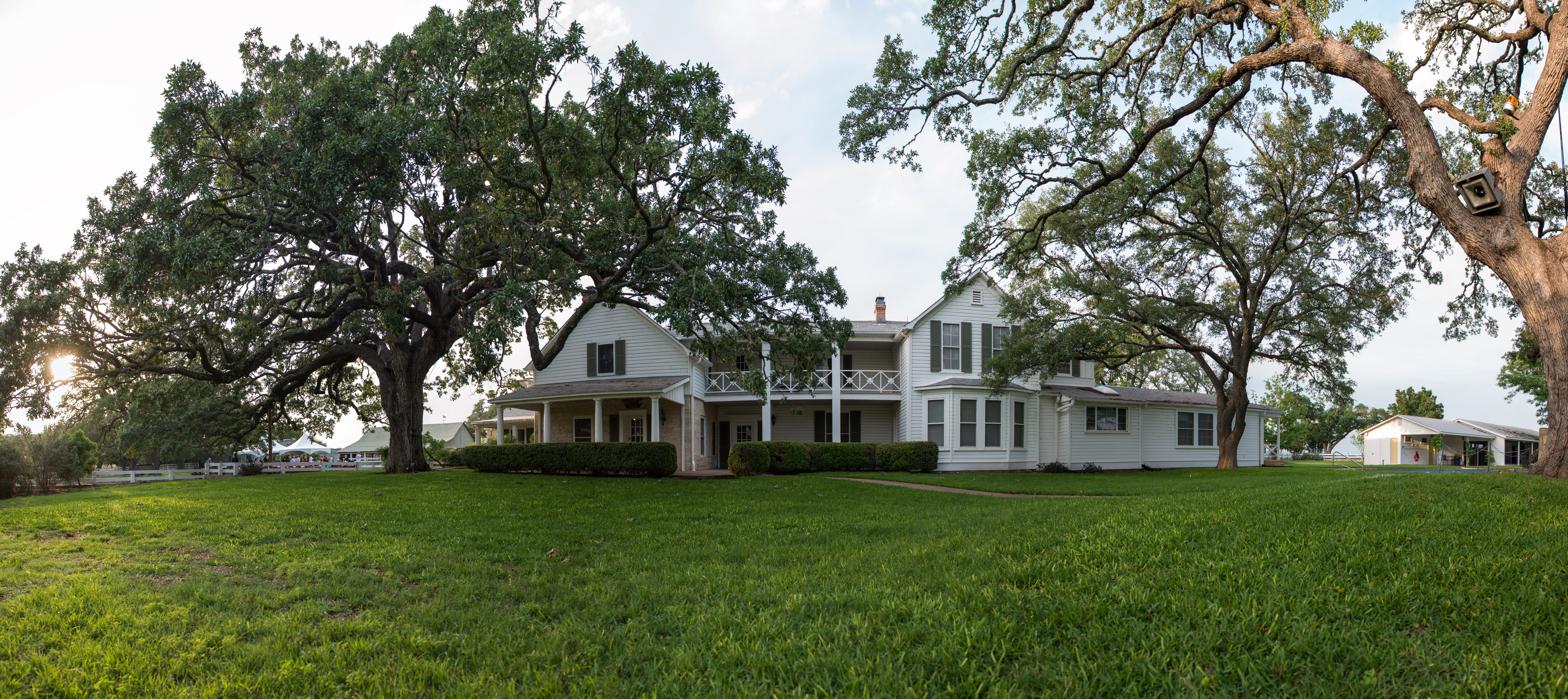
The Johnson Ranch, or "Texas White House"

In 1952, White was hired by Lady Bird Johnson (wife of then-Senator Lyndon B. Johnson) to be the primary architect overseeing the redesign and expansion of her Hill Country home near Johnson City, Texas, which would later be known as the "Texas White House" (now part of the Lyndon B. Johnson National Historical Park). In 1957, White was called back to design an expansion to the house for additional office space; after Johnson's election as vice president, in 1961 White redesigned the ranch's guest quarters to be more suitable for political visitors.

After the end of Johnson's presidency, White oversaw the restoration of Johnson's childhood home in 1969–70 for the newly created Lyndon B. Johnson National Historic Site; he also developed the master plan for the adjoining Lyndon B. Johnson State Park and Historic Site and designed its Visitor Center and other buildings. By this point White had become a sort of personal family architect for the Johnsons, and he came to be described as one of Lady Bird's "life-long best friends."

== Visual arts ==
Besides producing architectural sketches, White worked in two-dimensional art more generally. He was interested in the traditional log-and-limestone architecture used by early settlers of the Texas Hill Country, and he produced numerous sketches and watercolors of old farms and Central Texas landscapes. In his later life he exhibited some of these works, and they were gathered into two published collections, Limestone and Log and Hill Country Revisited.
