= Douglas County Courthouse (Washington) =

- U.S. National Register of Historic Places
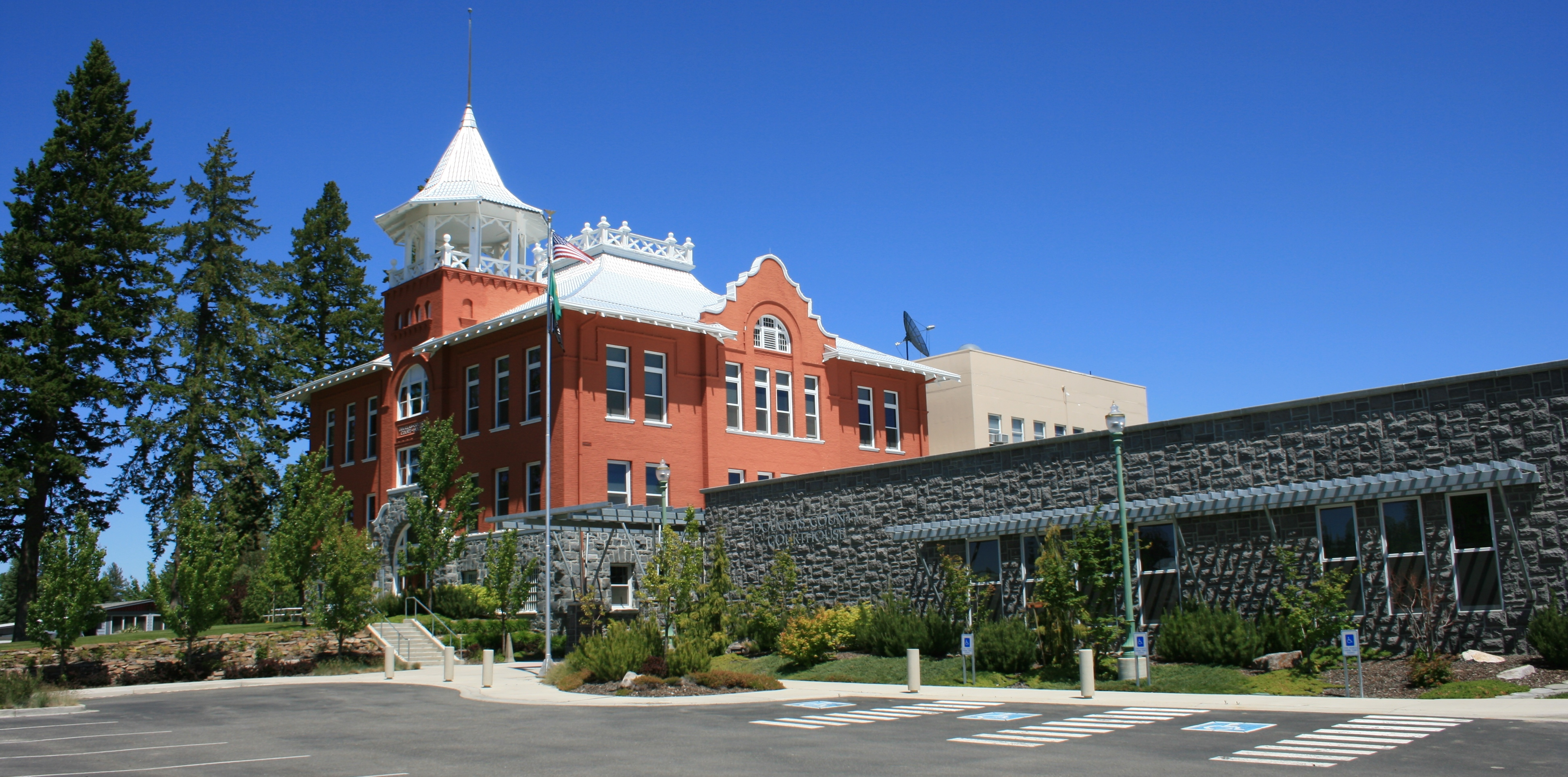

- Location within Washington (state) Location within the United States
- Interactive map showing the location of Douglas County Courthouse
- Location: Off U.S. 2, Waterville, Washington
- Coordinates: 47°38′46″N 120°4′0″W
- Area: less than one acre
- Built: 1905
- Built by: William Oliver
- Architect: Newton C. Gauntt
- Architectural style: Late Victorian, Eclectic
- NRHP reference No.: 75001849
- Added to NRHP: September 5, 1975

The Douglas County Courthouse is a courthouse located in Waterville, Washington, the county seat of Douglas County, Washington.

The Douglas County Courthouse was constructed in 1905 to replace an earlier, wood-frame building. Designed by Newton Gauntt, the brick, Victorian-style structure is a two-story building that is approximately 60 feet (18 m) by 60 feet (18 m) in plan.

It was added to the National Register of Historic Places in 1975.
