= Fire station =

Structure for storage of firefighting apparatus

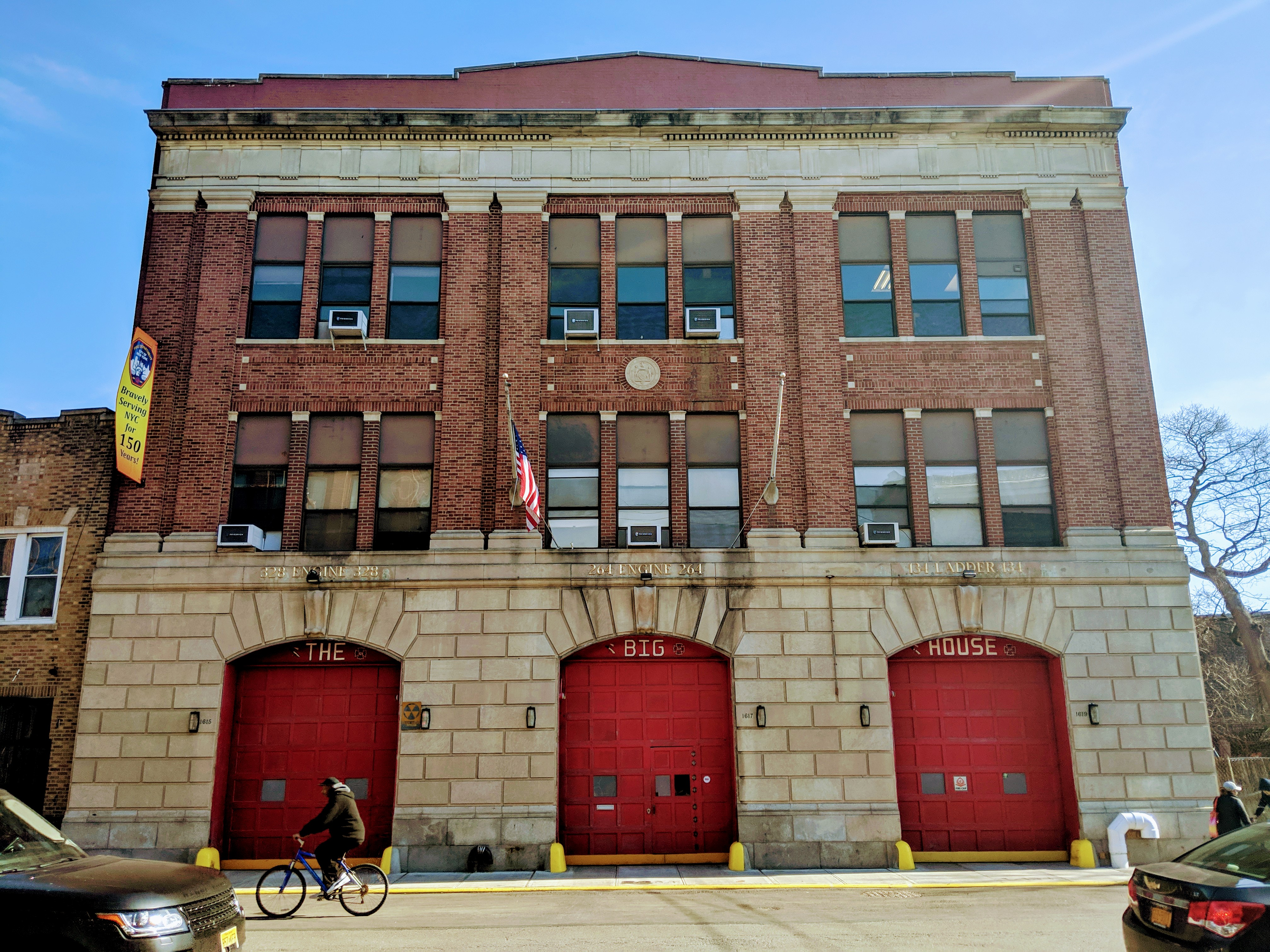
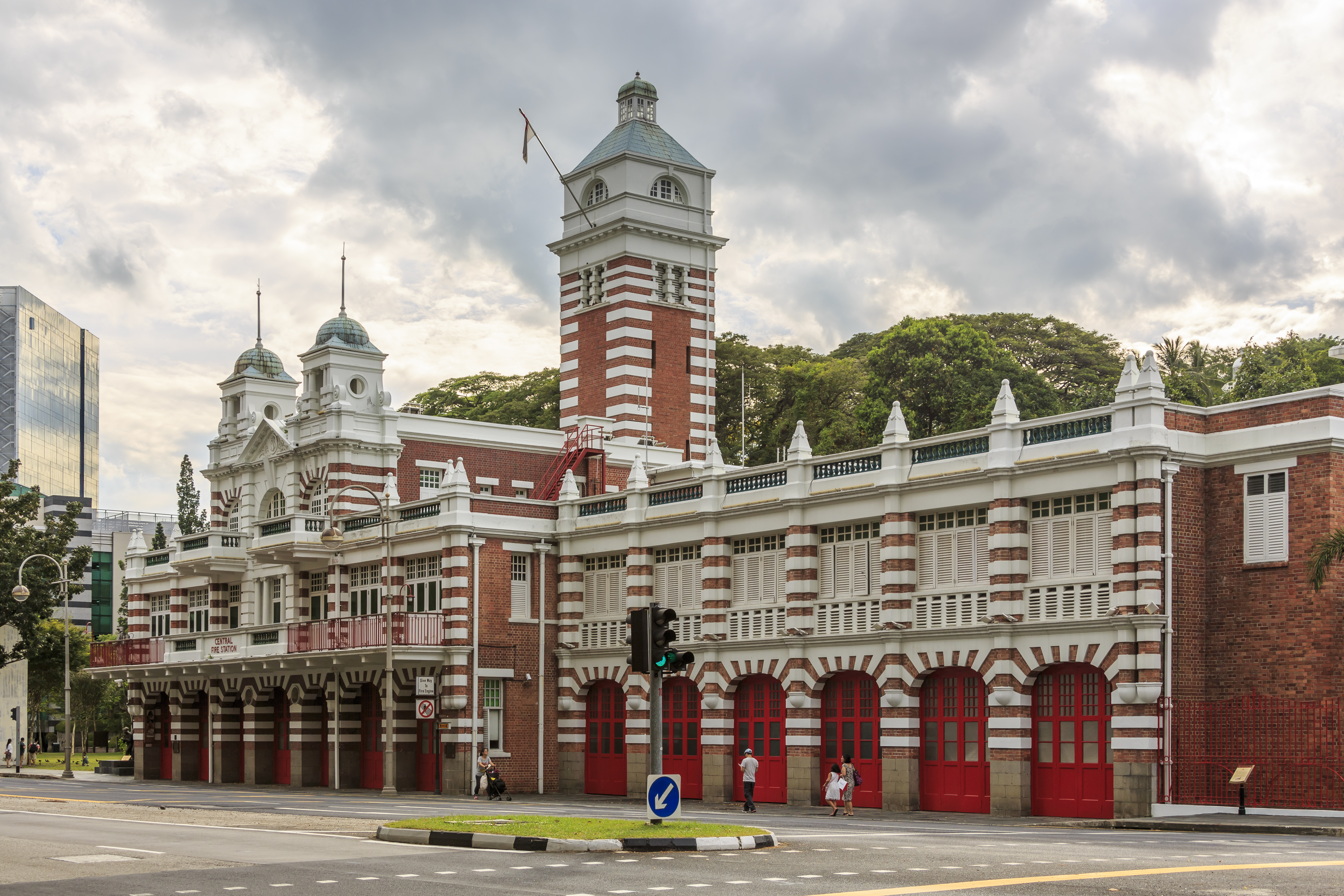
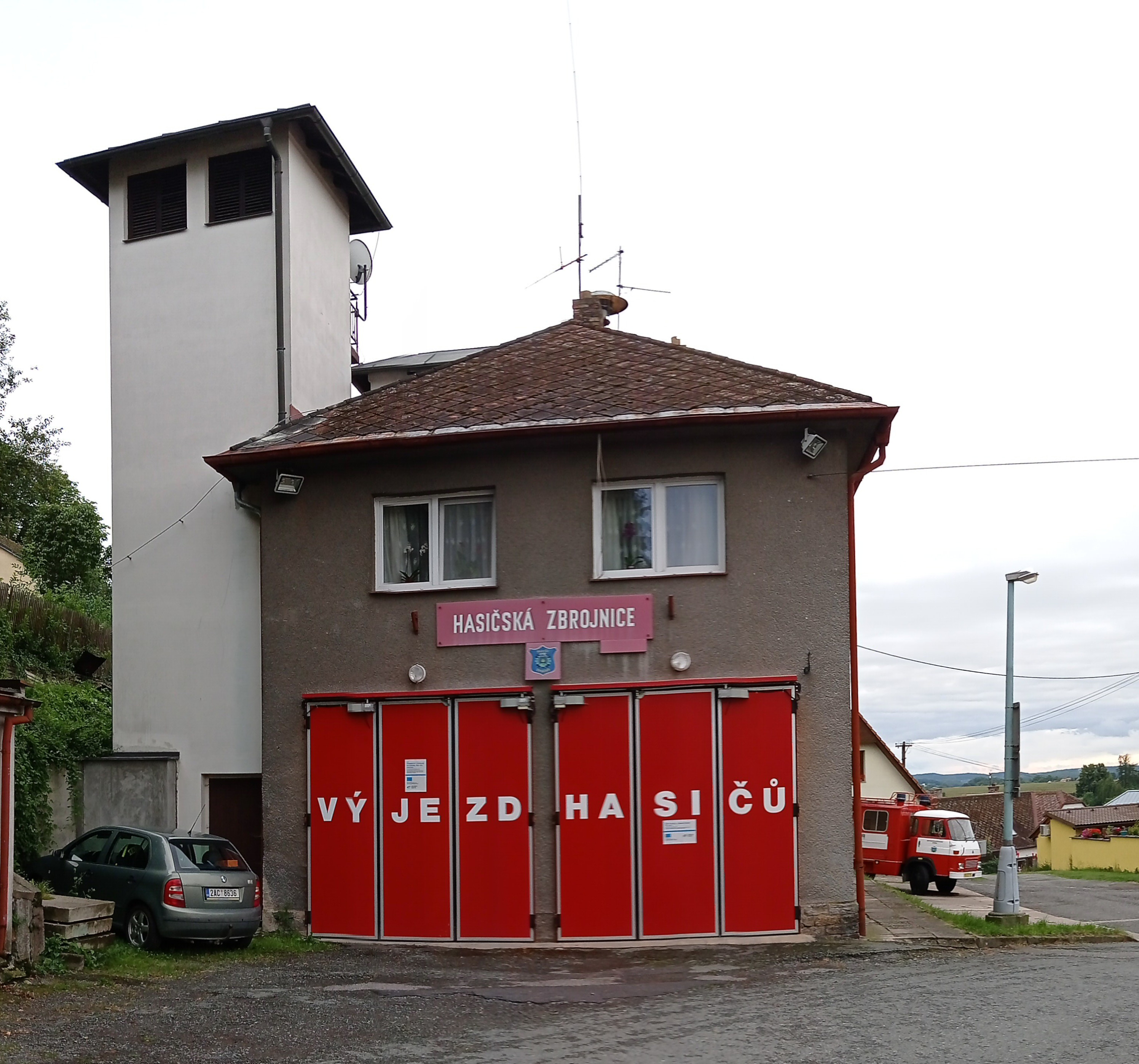
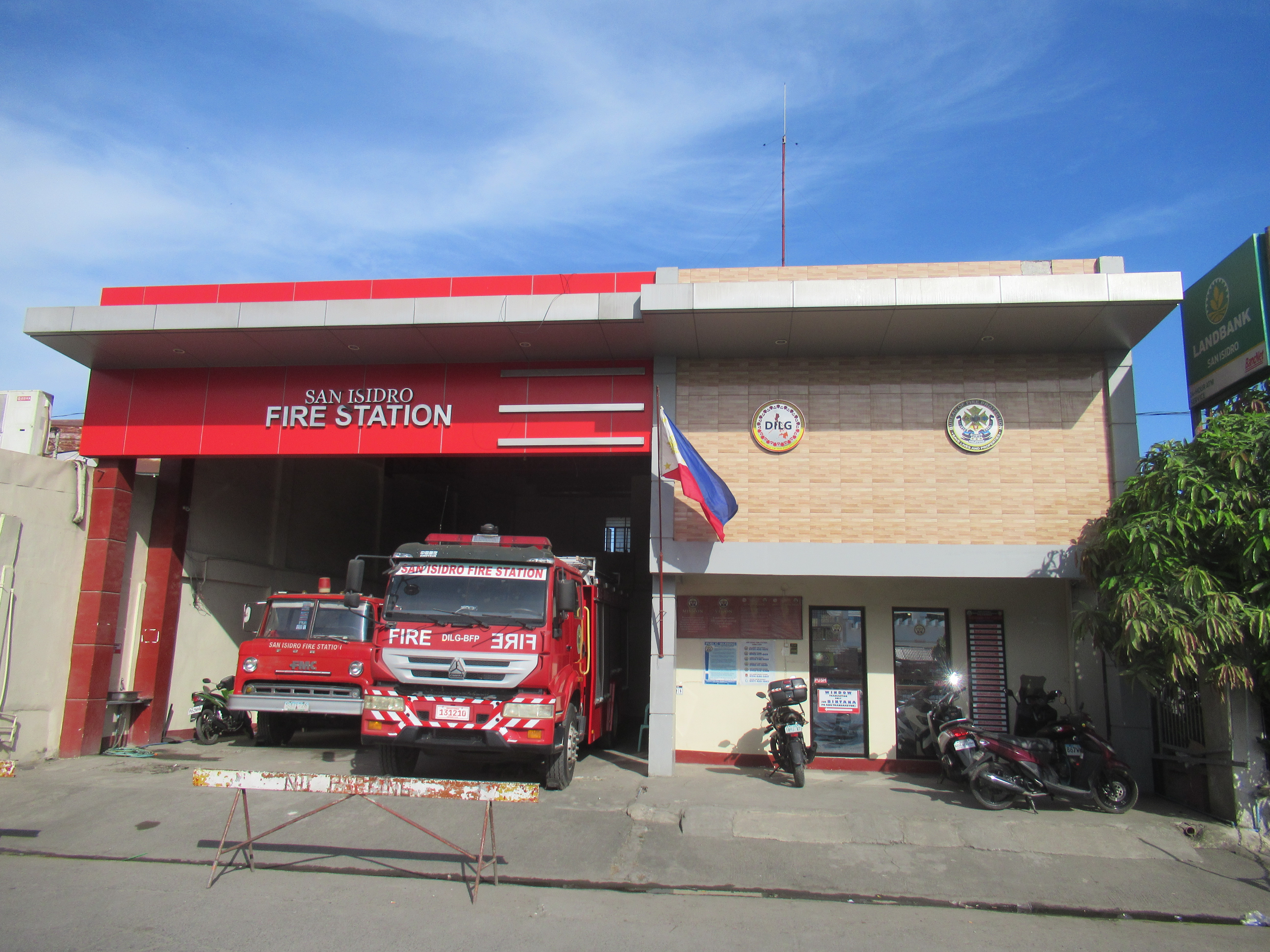
Fire stations of varying sizes and architecture

A fire station (also called a fire house, fire hall, firemen's hall, or engine house) is a structure or other area for storing firefighting apparatuses such as fire engines and related vehicles, personal protective equipment, fire hoses and other specialized equipment. Fire stations frequently contain working and living space for the firefighters and support staff.

In large U.S. cities, fire stations are often named for the primary fire companies and apparatus housed there, such as "Ladder 49". Other fire stations are named based on the settlement, neighborhood or street where they are located, or given a number.

== Facilities ==
A fire station will at a minimum have a garage for housing at least one fire engine. There will also be storage space for equipment, though the most important equipment is stored in the vehicle itself. The approaches to a fire station are often posted with warning signs, and there may be a traffic signal to stop or warn traffic when apparatus are leaving or returning to the station.

Fire stations have often been built with a tower, for purposes that have changed with time. A drill tower is used for practicing high-rise rescue, while a hose tower is used for hanging hoses to dry to prevent rot. Historically, towers were lookouts for spotting fires.

Activities at a fire station include regular inspection and cleaning of the apparatus and equipment, and training drills in which the firefighters practice their skills. Some fire companies also host public activities at the fire station during events such as a "fire prevention week", and the facility may also be used for fund-raising by the "firemen's association", "fire buffs", or "fire auxiliary".

=== Occupied stations ===
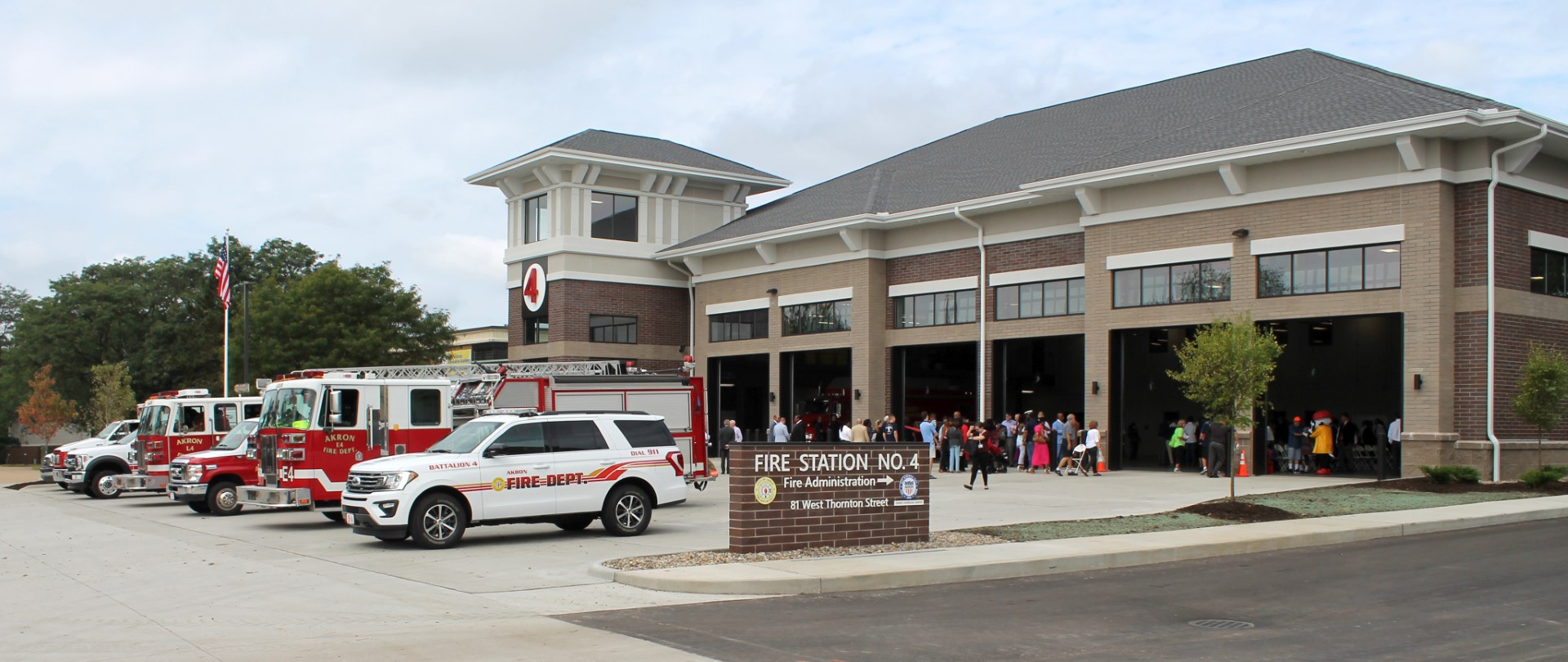
A full-time fire station in Akron, Ohio, United States

If the station is occupied full-time by career firefighters, it will contain living quarters and work areas, where they wait until a callout comes through. Career firefighters are usually able to sleep during a night shift, so these stations will also have dormitories. There will be an alarm system to alert them of an emergency call, and to give some indication of where and what the emergency is. In some small fire departments, the only alarm may be a telephone for receiving calls.

Many fire stations were built with the living quarters above the garage. This arrangement is common for fire stations built in a crowded city. The fireman's pole was invented to allow firefighters to quickly descend to the garage. In modern times, agencies such as the National Fire Protection Association have argued that these pose a safety hazard. Modern fire stations are often built with the living quarters on the same level as the garage.

=== Unoccupied stations ===
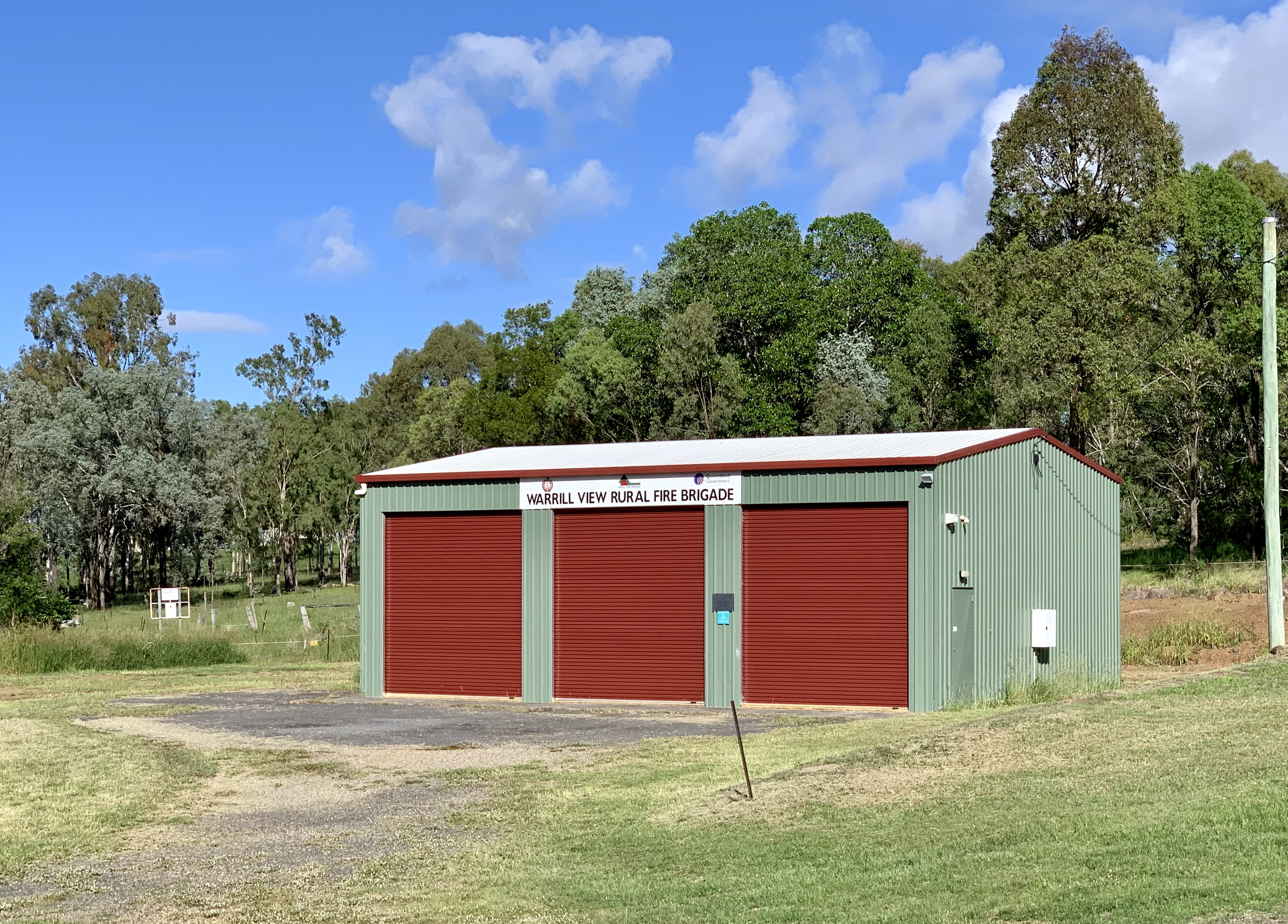
A volunteer rural fire station in Warrill View, Queensland, Australia

Some fire stations are not regularly occupied, with the firefighting carried out by volunteer or retained firefighters. In this case, the firefighters are summoned to the fire station by siren, radio or pagers, where they will then deploy the fire engine. These fire stations may still have office space for the firefighters, a library of reference and other materials, and a "trophy wall" or case where the firefighters display memorabilia.

== See also ==
- Firefighting
- List of fire stations
- Fire department
- Fireman's pole
