= Col. Monroe M. Shipe House =

Historic house in Texas, United States

- U.S. National Register of Historic Places
- Recorded Texas Historic Landmark
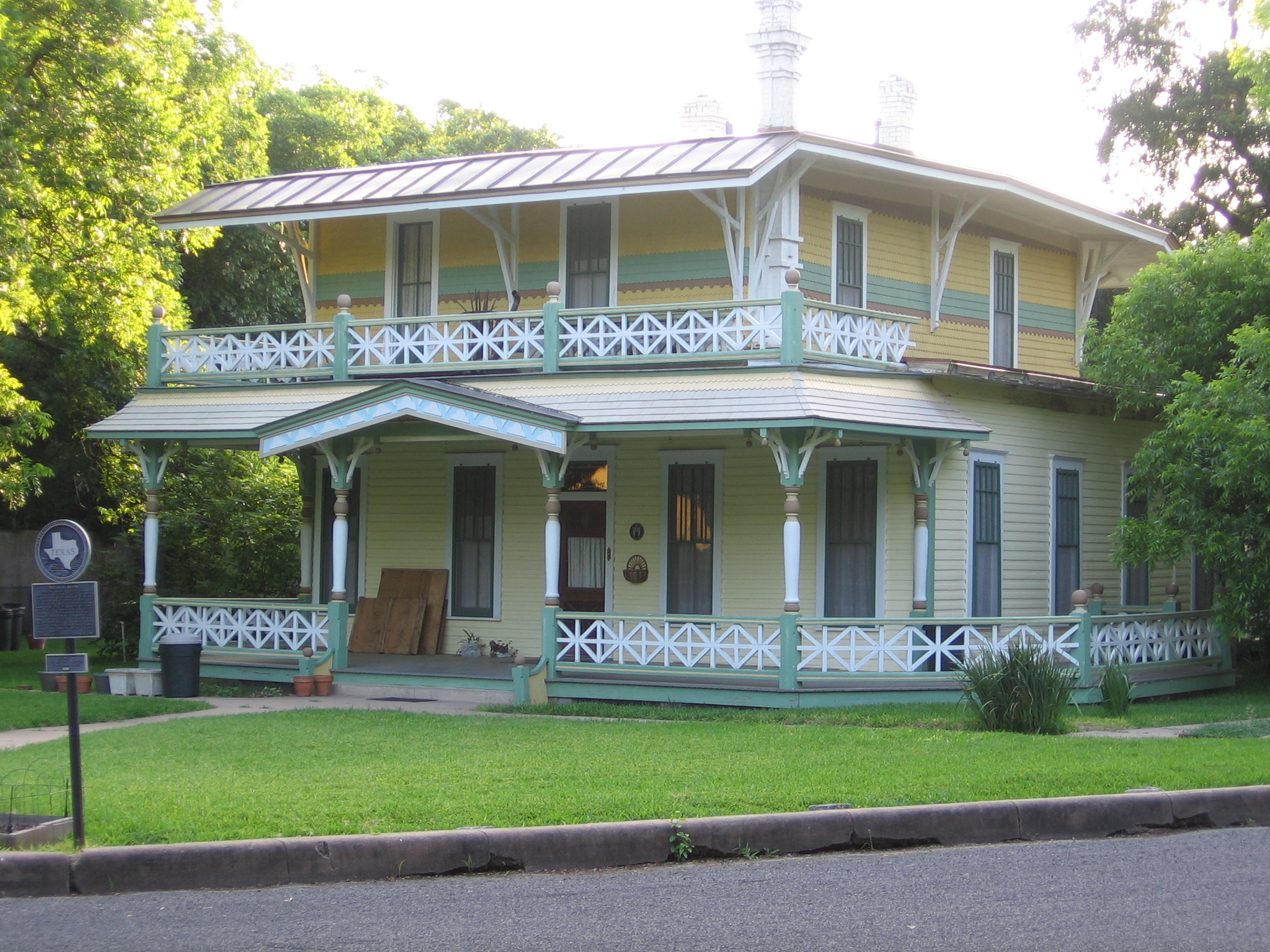
- Location: 3816 Avenue G, Austin, Texas, USA
- Coordinates: 30°18′3″N 97°43′52″W
- Built: 1892
- NRHP reference No.: 83003167
- RTHL No.: 14361

Significant dates
- Added to NRHP: March 29, 1983
- Designated RTHL: 1982

The Col. Monroe M. Shipe House is a historic two-story home in the Hyde Park historic district in Austin, Texas, United States. The building was completed by Monroe M. Shipe, founder of Hyde Park, in 1892. It uses an eclectic combination of styles, including a Stick style form, Queen Anne decorations, and a flat concrete roof.

Shipe platted the entire neighborhood of Hyde Park, and designated the few blocks near his home to be a subdivision he called "Shadowlawn."

During renovation, it was discovered that the lumber in the home came from the grandstands of the State Fair of Texas which was once held nearby.

The home is located at 3816 Avenue G. It was added to the National Register of Historic Places on March 29, 1983.
