= Peter and Clotilde Shipe Mansbendel House =

Historic house in Texas, United States

- Peter Mansbendel and Clotilde Shipe House
- U.S. National Register of Historic Places
- Recorded Texas Historic Landmark
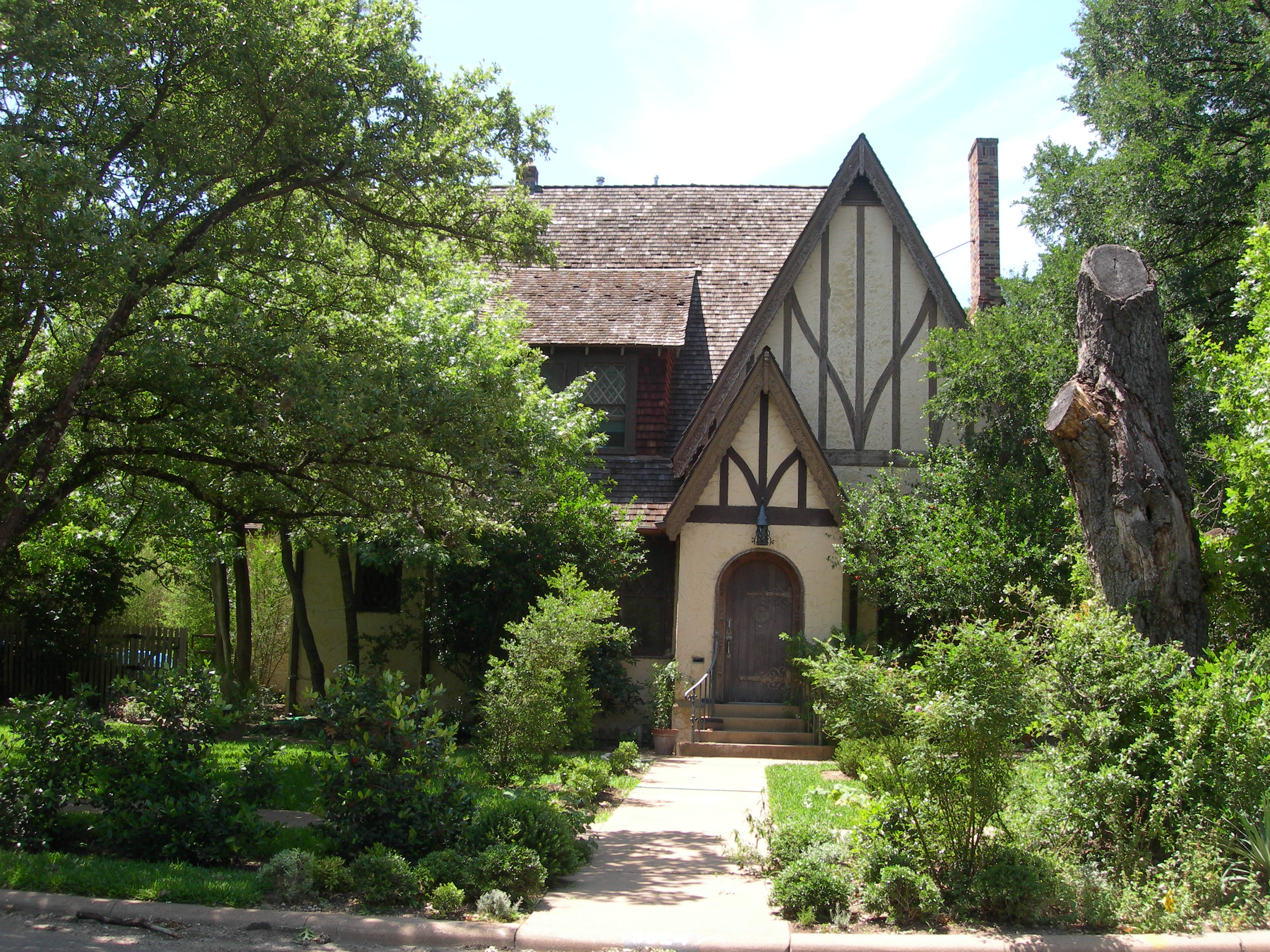
- Location: 3824 Ave. F Austin, Texas, USA
- Coordinates: 30°18′04.94″N 97°43′55.79″W
- Built: 1925
- Architect: Peter Mansbendel
- Architectural style: Tudor Revival
- MPS: Hyde Park MPS
- NRHP reference No.: 90001183
- RTHL No.: 17721

Significant dates
- Added to NRHP: August 16, 1990
- Designated RTHL: 1970

The Peter and Clotilde Shipe Mansbendel House is an historic home in the Hyde Park Historic District in Austin, Texas, United States. It is also a part of the Shadow Lawn Historic District, a subdivision within the Hyde Park neighborhood established by Hyde Park founder Monroe M. Shipe.

The house was built in 1925 by Peter Mansbendel, a master carpenter who personally added carved-wood decorations to the home. Mansbendel also carved wooden doors for the mid-century restoration of the Governor's Palace in San Antonio, and provided work for Austin's first permanent public library in 1933.

The house is located at 3824 Avenue F. It was added to the National Register of Historic Places in 1990.
