= Monroe M. Shipe =

American real estate and streetcar network developer

Colonel Monroe M. Shipe
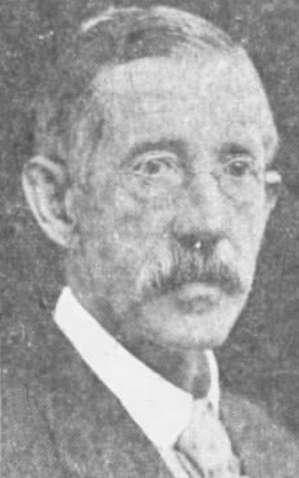
- Born: Monroe Martin Shipe; March 12, 1847; Paris, Ohio
- Died: April 27, 1924 (aged 77); Austin, Texas, United States
- Occupation: Real estate developer
- Known for: Hyde Park
- Spouse: Adele
- Children: Glenn Shipe; Clotilde Mansbendel

Colonel Monroe Martin Shipe (March 12, 1847 – April 27, 1924), also called M. M. Shipe, was an American real estate developer who developed Hyde Park, an early streetcar suburb in Austin, Texas. He also founded the Austin Electric Railway Company, a streetcar network that initially served Hyde Park but expanded to become the public transit network for the city of Austin and, eventually, the direct predecessor of Austin's current transit agency, Capital Metropolitan Transportation Authority.

== Personal life ==
Shipe was born on March 12, 1847, in Paris, Ohio, and graduated from the Canton Academy. His career prior to moving to Austin was varied. He began as a traveling sales agent for his brother, who was an inventor, then moved briefly to Florida to manage a large orange grove. Then on to Abilene, Kansas where he became a prominent member of the community and, in 1887, developed a mule-drawn street railway system for the city. However, Abilene's boom economy collapsed in 1888 leading to the failure of Shipe's street railway.

In 1889, Shipe and his wife, Adele, moved from Abilene to Austin with $830. Shipe had taken a role as an agent for the Missouri-Kansas-Texas Railroad. Within a few years, he bought an undeveloped area of land north of town with that money, convinced the City Council to give him a franchise to run electric streetcars, and built five miles of rail running from downtown to his plot of land which he named Hyde Park.

Glenn, Shipe's son, was born in Abilene but moved to Austin with his father and assisted in the development of Hyde Park. Glenn was a real estate developer in North Austin until his death in 1944.

Shipe's daughter, Clotilde, married Swiss woodworker Peter Mansbendel. They lived in the Tudor Revival style Peter and Clotilde Shipe Mansbendel House in Hyde Park. Mansbendel was notable for decorative interiors of high-value homes in Houston and Dallas and work on a number of buildings at The University of Texas. He emigrated to the US in 1907 and moved to Austin in 1911 as Clotilde Shipe's fiancé, having met her while he was living in the Northeast. After they married in 1911, they initially lived in Monroe Shipe's house for a year but then moved to New York until 1915. Their Hyde Park home was completed around 1925 with Mansbendel as the house's architect and providing decorative carving throughout. Clotilde lived in the house until her death in 1963.

Shipe was influential in a variety of affairs within the city of Austin including advocating for a commission form of city government, the damming of the Colorado River, and helping to develop the city's commission charter. In 1895, Shipe made an unsuccessful bid for mayor of Austin. Shipe died at his home in Austin on April 27, 1924.

== Streetcars ==
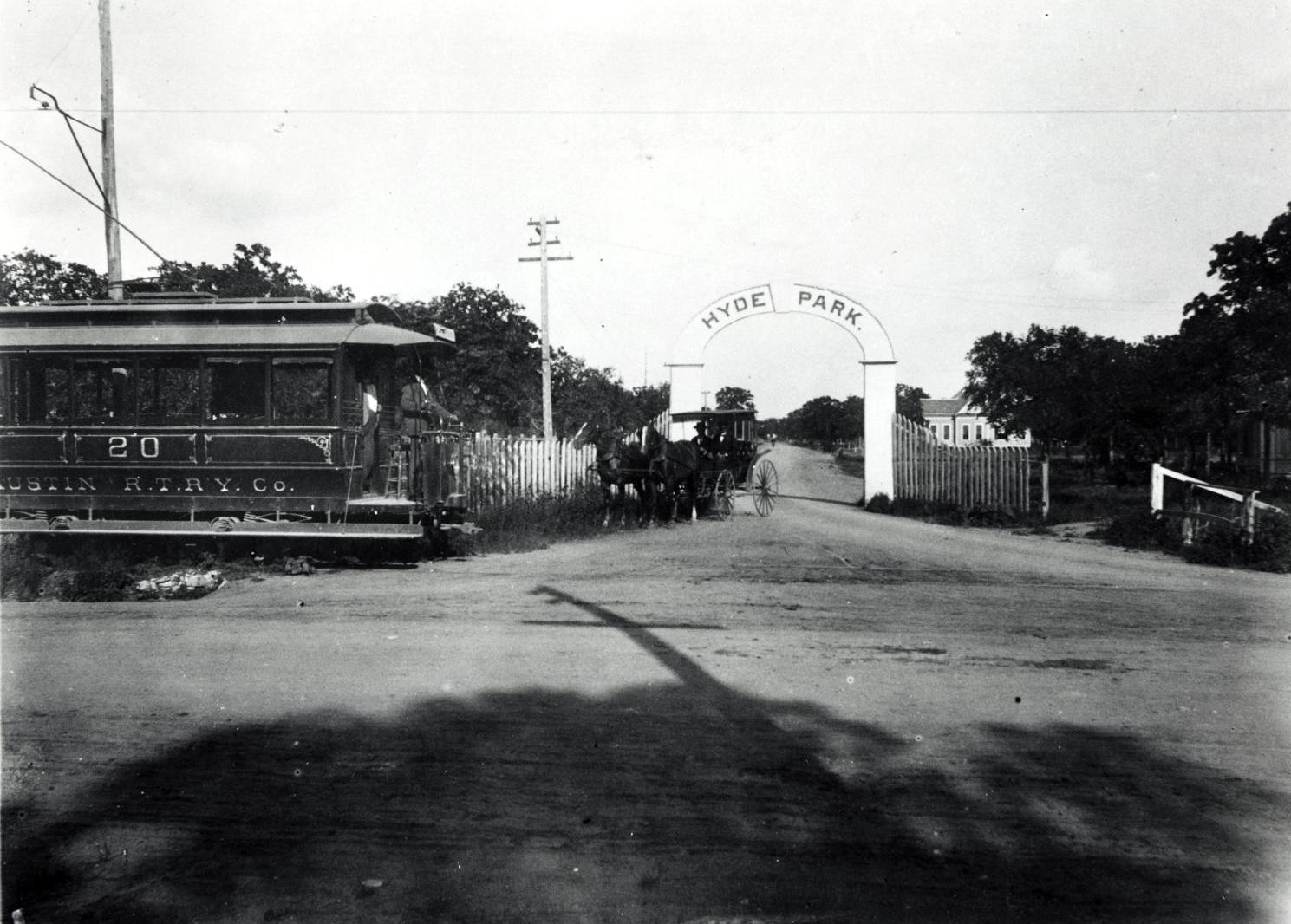
An Austin Electric Railway Company streetcar passes the Hyde Park entrance in the 1890s

Shortly after moving to Austin in 1889, Shipe borrowed $62,500 to found the Austin Electric Railway Company and applied for a city franchise for his new company to run an electric streetcar line from downtown Austin to a plot of land about 20 blocks north of the city. This plot would become his development, Hyde Park. The Austin City Council awarded him the franchise in 1890 to build a line on Congress Avenue, west on Pecan Street (now Sixth Street), and north on Rio Grande Street and Old Georgetown Road (now Guadalupe Street) to a loop through the new development. Shipe's franchise only allowed him to build track on streets not already occupied by other networks.

Very quickly, Shipe built a road to his new development, laid the rails for the new line, and built a powerhouse to power it. The streetcar began running in February 1891 as only the second electric streetcar system in Texas.

The first year of the new company was tumultuous and Shipe faced significant competition from Austin's established mule-drawn streetcar operators, especially the Austin City Railroad Company which had been running since 1874. Restricted by his limited franchise, Shipe complained that his rivals "went about laying small stretches of track on so many streets–just to keep my line off of them". In April a flood caused derailments and cut electric power to Shipe's streetcar for two days. However, in May the Austin City Railroad's mule barn burned down resulting in the death of 30 mules and destruction of 16 of the company's 19 cars. Just a few weeks later, the mule-drawn streetcar company merged into Shipe's company and ceased operations eliminating Ship's primary competitor.

Shipe left the streetcar company in December 1891 to focus on his real estate development efforts.

== Hyde Park ==
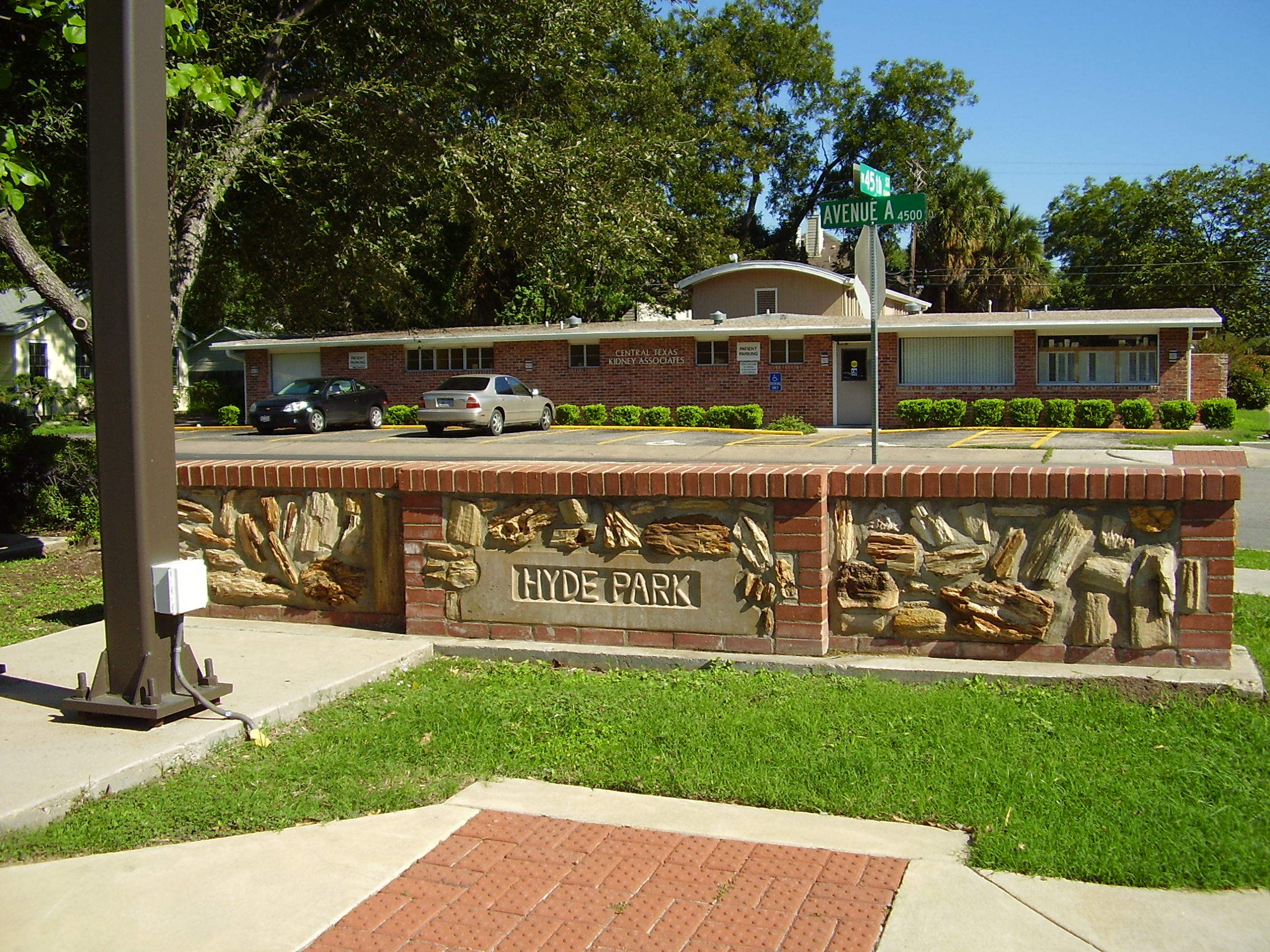
Hyde Park

Shipe purchased the land that would become his Hyde Park development in May 1890 for $70,000. He and his wife, Adele, transferred the land to the M.K. & T. Land Co. (Missouri, Kansas and Texas Land and Town Company), of which Shipe was founder and president, in December of that year for $180,000.00. The development was officially begun in January 1891. The area is considered to be Austin's first suburb and sat about 20 blocks north of the nascent City of Austin partially on land that was the site of the State Fair of Texas until 1884. The neighborhood was named after Hyde Park, London. Shipe's streetcar line made Hyde Park a streetcar suburb, a major factor in the development's early success.

While many neighborhoods of Austin at the time were racially integrated, Hyde Park was not only majority white but marketed by Shipe as a "whites only" neighborhood. Early advertisements promoted the development as "free from nuisances and an objectionable class of people, proper restrictions being taken to guard against undesirable occupants."

Shipe also advertised Hyde Park on its amenities including, according to a 1892 advertisement, "water mains, electric lights, gas, electric cars, the finest drives in the city, the most beautiful groves and two elegant lakes." Shipe built miles of street, all gravel as opposed to the more common dirt, and developed the neighborhoods first school, funding it himself until the city took over management years later. He also arranged to have Austin's first "moonlight tower" installed in Hyde Park as a form of street lighting, initially powering it with his own generator until Austin's city electric network reached the area.

=== Shipe House ===
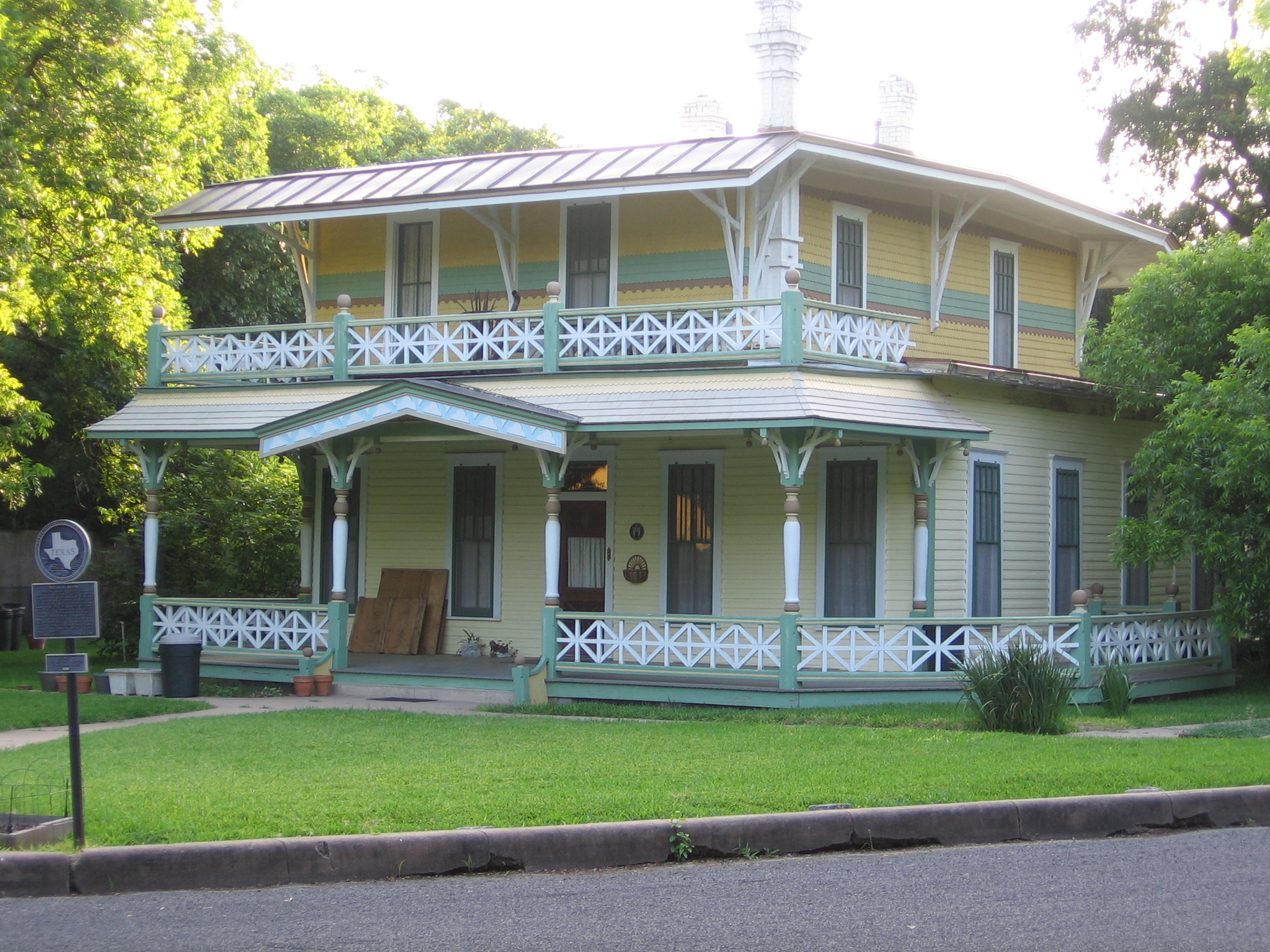
The Col. Monroe M. Shipe House in Hyde Park

Shipe built a two-story house for himself in Hyde Park, completing it in 1892 as one of the first houses in the development. The house sat in a subdivision of Hyde Park which Shipe called Shadowlawn. Shipe used some reclaimed lumber from the grandstands and fencing of the State Fair in the home's construction. After the fair's relocation to Dallas, part of the fairgrounds had become a portion of Hyde Park and most of the structures were demolished.

== See also ==
Austin area history

- History of Austin, Texas
- Timeline of Austin, Texas
- Austin History Center
- National Register of Historic Places listings in Travis County, Texas
- List of Recorded Texas Historic Landmarks (Sabine-Travis)

Streetcars

- Streetcars in North America
- List of streetcar systems in the United States
