= Ritz (Austin, Texas) =

Historic theater in Austin, Texas, United States

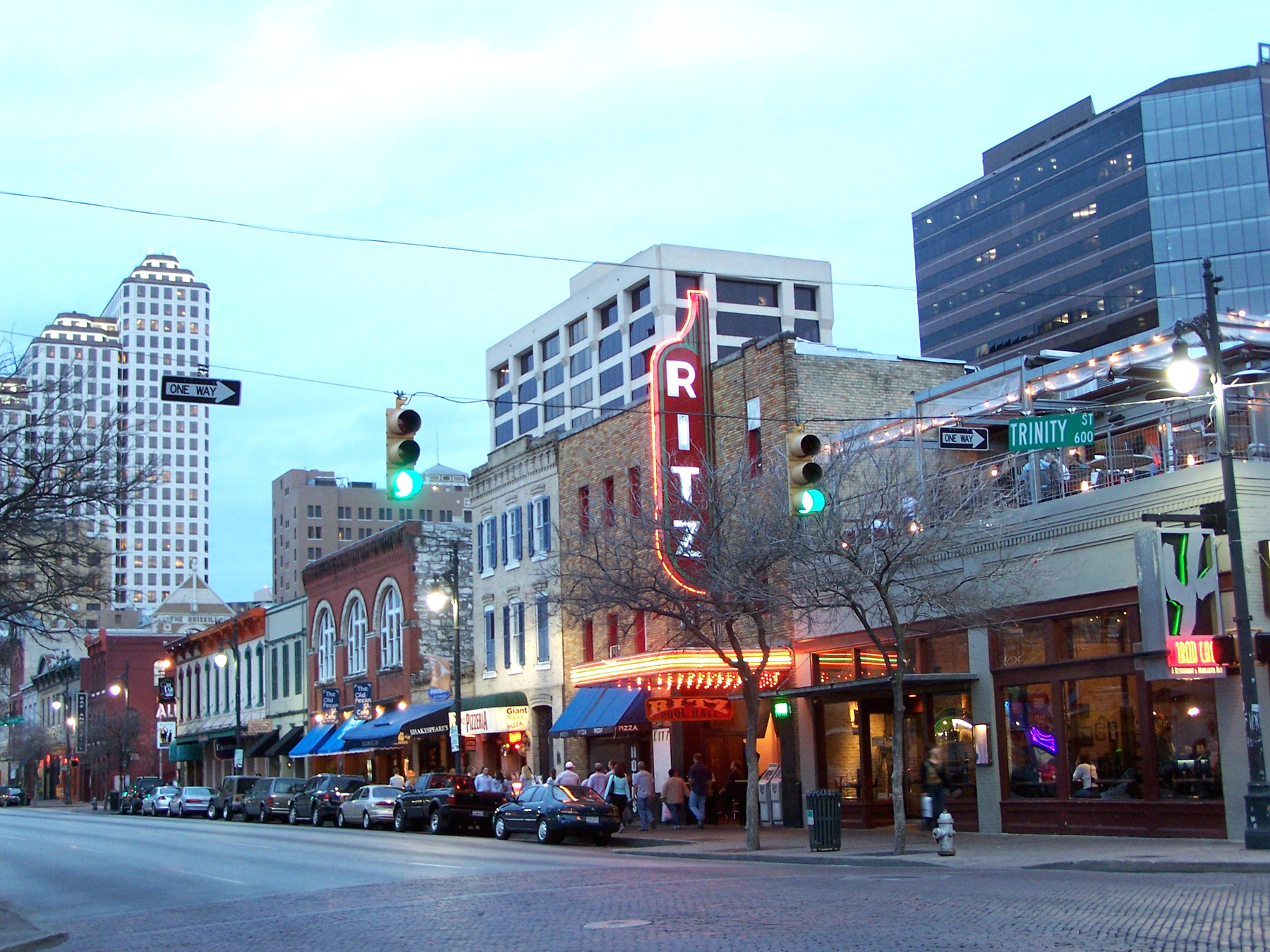
- Ritz, circa 2006
- Interactive map of Ritz
- Address: 320 E 6th St; Austin, Texas; United States
- Coordinates: 30.26731°N 97.73961°W
- Owner: Larry Craddock
- Capacity: 175
- Type: Movie theater

Construction
- Opened: October 13, 1929
- Rebuilt: 2007
- Years active: 1929–1964; 1970–2020
- Architect: Hugo Kuehne (1929) / Weiss Architecture (2007)

Website
- www.originalalamo.com

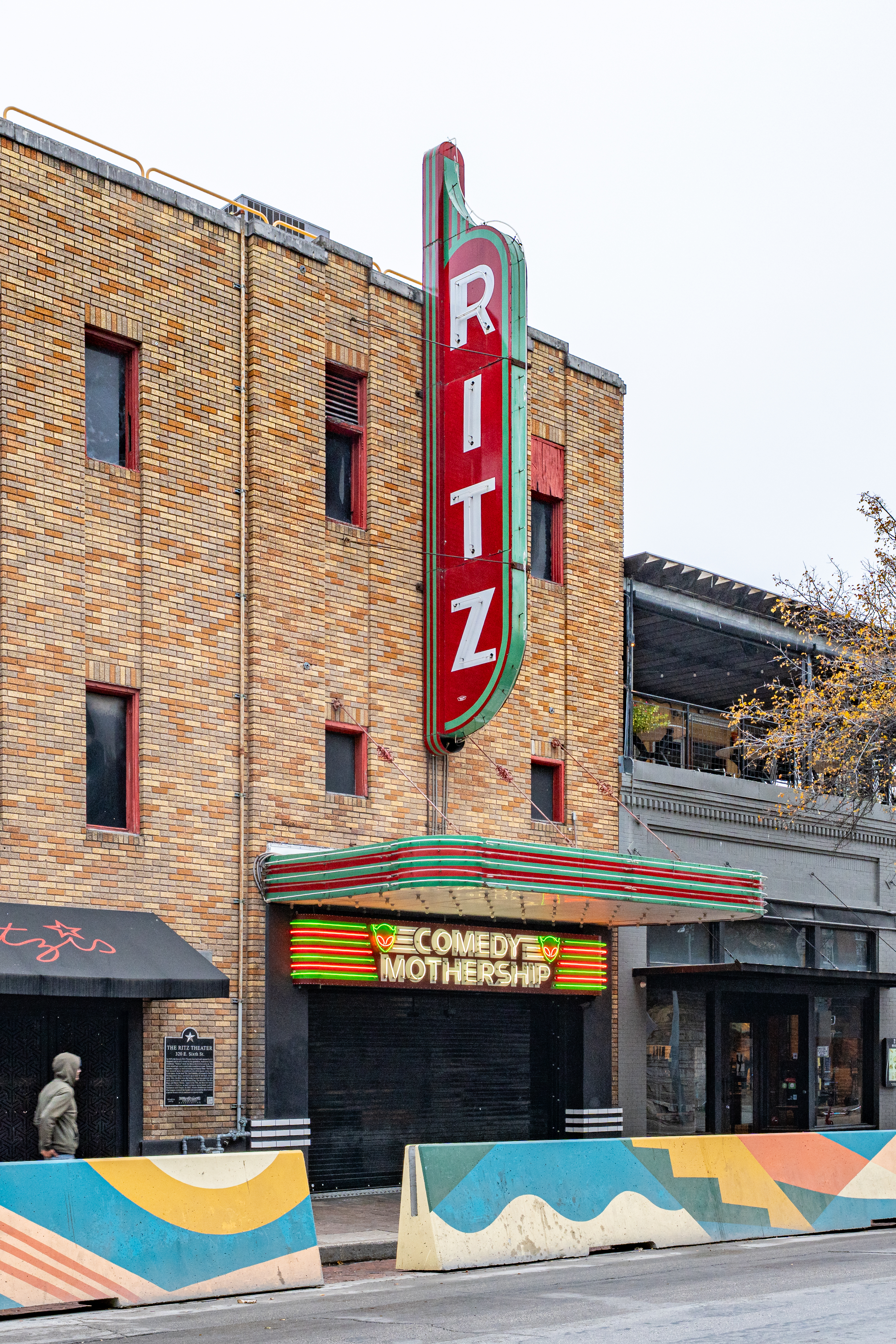
The theater operating as the Comedy Mothership (2025)

The Ritz is a historic theater in the 6th Street district in Austin, Texas. The building's history includes use as a movie theater, music hall, club, and comedy house. It reopened after renovations in fall 2007 as the new downtown location for the Alamo Drafthouse Cinema. The venue temporarily closed in 2020 due to the COVID-19 pandemic, and was permanently closed in 2021 when the Alamo Drafthouse filed for bankruptcy. It now serves as Joe Rogan’s comedy club, Comedy Mothership.

== History ==
The Ritz was built in 1929 by J.J. Hegman, who owned several movie theaters in Austin, Texas. It was the first theater in Austin to be built specifically for the talkies. The architect was Hugo Kuehne, the founding dean of the University of Texas School of Architecture, who also designed the Austin History Center (originally the Austin Public Library). The Ritz was originally a long narrow space, and was segregated like most movie theaters in Texas and other southern states at that time; there was a separate entrance leading to a balcony reserved for people of color.

The theater opened on 6th Street on October 13, 1929. It showed primarily first-run westerns with a lower ticket price than any other theater in town and frequently brought in stars like Wild Bill Elliott and Dub Taylor, along with country music acts who performed before the movies.

In 1937, Hegman's son Elmo took over management and expanded the theater to 800 seats by widening the theater by 25 feet. He continued showing Westerns until television siphoned off the audience; Elmo closed the theater in 1964.

Cary White, the production designer for The Faculty and Spy Kids, amongst other movies, was the projectionist and janitor at the Ritz during some of its last days as a movie house.

The theater remained shuttered until 1970, when it re-opened for three years as an adult theater. In October 1974, entrepreneurs Jim Franklin and Bill Livinggood renovated the theater and opened the doors as a music venue, offering an eclectic mix of programming from classical to rock and including live theater and movies. This was also short-lived, and the club closed in 1975. Several other groups moved in over the years. The Center Stage theater group took it over in 1977, closing off the balcony to make a second, separate theater. Again, the venue didn't last long and the late 1970s saw a serious decline in the theater's fortunes, including another stint into porn exhibition.

In 1981, Shannon Sedwick and Michael Shelton took out a lease and turned management over to Craig Underwood, who began running the venue as a punk rock club. Shows such as Black Flag, which inaugurated the punk era on May 7, 1982, The Misfits, Hüsker Dü, The Circle Jerks, The Dead Kennedys, Minor Threat and others showed that there was an audience for hardcore and opened the doors for an influx of punk rock into the Austin music scene. The violence inherent to punk rock shows eventually cost the operators their liquor license, forcing another closure in late 1982. Stevie Ray Vaughan & Double Trouble Play March 18 & 19, 1983. In fall 1983, Sedwick and Shelton relocated their successful Esther's Follies, a comedy troupe that still entertains Austin just a few blocks further east on 6th St. Esther's Follies was only one of the attractions hosted by the Ritz at that time. The managers also began reintroducing music, from Texas bands to heavy metal, and very cautiously brought back a little bit of punk rock. The most famous show played at The Ritz in the eighties was the Red Hot Chili Peppers November 23 show there in 1986. The building has consistently been a music venue, bar, and pool hall since that time.

On March 20, 2007, the Alamo Drafthouse Cinema announced that they would be relocating their downtown cinema, which was the original theater opened in 1997, to the Ritz. They began construction on April 1, 2007 to revive the Ritz as a movie theater.

During renovation, a group of filmmakers from Fantastic Fest were given a tour of the construction site, and inaugurated the theater with the first film to play there — Maurice Devereaux's End of the Line. The official grand opening was held on November 2, 2007, with a triple feature of Matango, No Country for Old Men, and War of the Gargantuas.

In 2021, Alamo Drafthouse announced they were filing for Chapter 11 bankruptcy due to the impact of the COVID-19 pandemic. As part of the company’s restructuring plans, they closed the Ritz Theatre, which served as the flagship theatre for the chain.

Shortly after, comedian Joe Rogan bought and remodeled the Ritz. In March 2023, he reopened it as The Comedy Mothership, which now serves as his comedy club. The original Ritz sign can still be seen on the front of the building.
