= Austin History Center =

- Austin History Center (NRHP: Austin Public Library)
- U.S. National Register of Historic Places
- Recorded Texas Historic Landmark
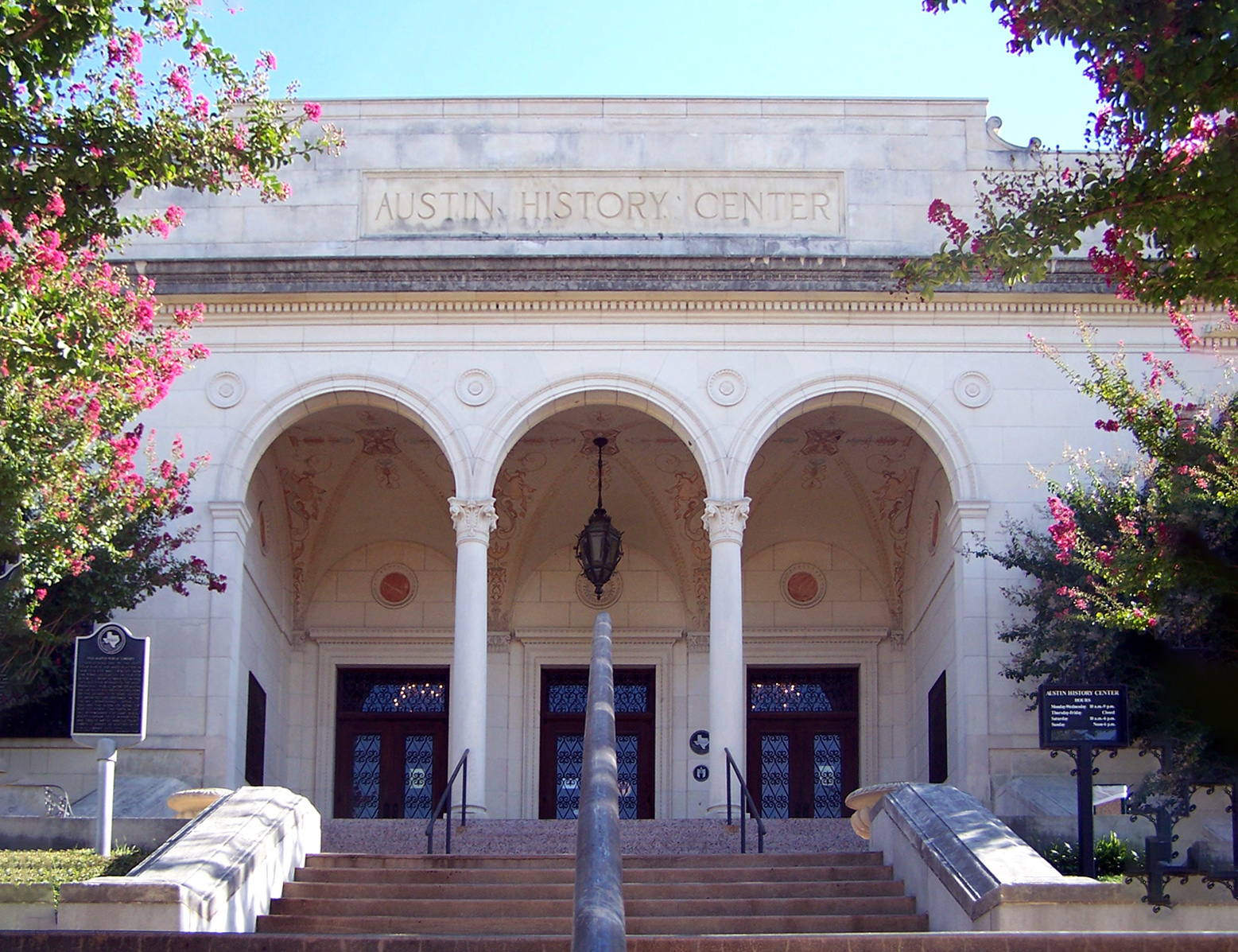
- The Austin History Center main entrance

- Location within Texas Location within the United States
- Location: 810 Guadalupe St; Austin, Texas, USA
- Coordinates: 30°16′17″N 97°44′44″W
- Built: 1933
- Architect: Hugo Kuehne; J. Roy White
- Architectural style: Renaissance Revival
- NRHP reference No.: 93000389
- RTHL No.: 6425

Significant dates
- Added to NRHP: May 6, 1993
- Designated RTHL: 1993

The Austin History Center is the local history collection of the Austin Public Library and the city's historical archive.

The building opened as the official Austin Public Library in 1933 and served as the main library until 1979, when library functions moved to the John Henry Faulk Library, a newer facility next door. Its site, which overlooks one of four public squares platted in Austin in 1839, was obtained from the Texas Legislature in 1913 for construction of a public library. The Renaissance Revival structure, built in 1933 during the implementation of the 1928 Austin city plan, was designed by local architect J. Roy White, working for the architectural firm of Austin native Hugo Kuehne, founding dean of the University of Texas School of Architecture. The building also contains work by several Austin craftsmen, including ironworker Fortunat Wiegl, wood-carver Peter Mansbendel, and fresco artist Harold "Bubi" Jessen.

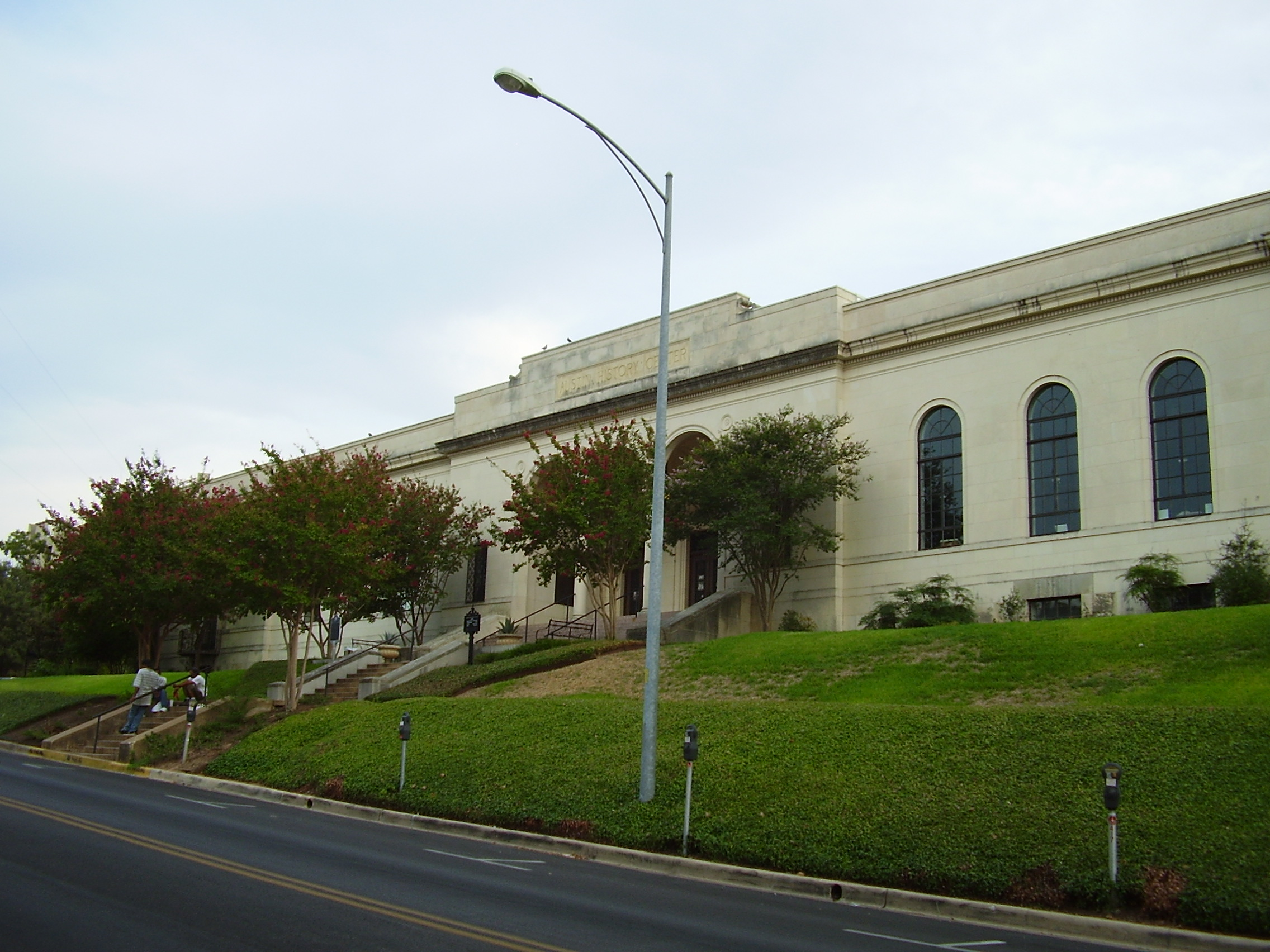
View of the Austin History Center

The Austin History Center celebrated its 50th anniversary in 2005. As of 2008 it houses thousands of documents, photographs, maps, artifacts, and personal histories. It features special exhibits and speakers on a regular basis.

The historic library building was added to the National Register of Historic Places on May 6, 1993. A Texas Historical Commission marker placed in front of the library identifies it as a Texas Historic Landmark recorded in 1993.

In 2025, the Austin History Center moved into the former John Henry Faulk Central Library building. A grand reopening ceremony was held on December 7th, 2025.

== Interior architecture and design ==
=== Loggia fresco ===
The front entrance to the Austin History Center has a loggia, an exterior covered corridor, supported by Corinthian column arches that complement its architectural style. Accomplished local craftsmen contributed to the design of the original building. Among these local craftsmen, Harold “Bubi” Jessen hand-painted a fresco on the ceiling of the loggia. The plaster of the groin vaulted ceiling features winged horses and curved flowing lines. Bubi Jessen came to Austin, Texas as a child from Germany. He attended the University of Texas as an architecture student. He later became an instructor and designed more than 20 buildings for the University of Texas. Jessen was also the author of a children's book titled “Humbert the Lion”.

=== Ironwork ===
There are three large wooden double doors with transom windows above that lead into the main entrance lobby of the Austin History Center. The glass of the doors, transom windows, and exterior window balconies all have ornate ironwork created by master ironsmith Fortunat Weigl. Fortunat immigrated to Austin, Texas from Albing, Germany. He started F. Weigl Iron Works with the help of a local woodcarver, Peter Mansbendel. F. Weigl Iron Works was operated by Fortunat Weigl and his two sons, Fortunat Lee Weigl and Herb Weigl from 1935 to 1977 at First St. and Red River St., where it has now become Iron Works Barbeque. The legacy of the Weigl family iron smithing trade continues with Weigl Iron Works in Fredericksburg.

=== Interior wood detailing ===
Contributing to the interior wooden craftsmanship of the Austin Public Library was the handiwork of a Swiss immigrant woodcarver named Peter Mansbendel. Peter started wood carving from an early age and studied in London, Paris, and New York. While in New York, Peter Mansbendel met his future wife Clotilde Shipe, whose father, Monroe M. Shipe, was the real estate developer of the Hyde Park subdivision in Austin, Texas. Samples of Peter Mansbendel's work can be found in the Union Building of the University of Texas at Austin in the form of carved plaques of former university presidents. In San Antonio, Mansbendel replicated the doors of Mission San Jose in black walnut wood.

=== Main lobby ===
The main lobby of the Austin History Center features a tripartite division of the walls. An oak wainscoting dado lines the lower perimeter of the room, while imitation travertine Corinthian pilasters appear along the wall between the doors that lead up to a full entablature at the ceiling. The ceiling is made of plaster and has five paneled sections with chandeliers adding to the classical design of this room. Throughout the lobby and into some of the other rooms are rubber tile floors that are original to the building since 1933.

=== Holt Gallery ===
The David Earl Holt Gallery Room, located just to the left of the front lobby, accommodates up to 62 people and is available for reservation by non-profit organizations. Visitors may enter this room from the hallway through large wooden double doors that have glass transoms overhead. Inside the room is a fireplace between the two entrance doors. The fireplace mantle and surround is original to the building since it was the Austin Public Library in 1933. The fireplace surround features pilasters on each side supported by high relief brackets and a carved stone mantelpiece with a bas-relief carving by Fred Eder. Oak trim baseboards line the interior room floor.

=== Mayor's Room ===
The Mayor's Room, which is entered either from the hallway or from the Holt Gallery, gets its name from the pictures hung around the room of Mayors of Austin since 1839.

=== O. Henry Collection ===
The O. Henry Room contains a large collection of a mixed array of material from William Sydney Porter. William Porter was a local to Austin in the late 1800s and used the pen name O. Henry when writing short stories. Some original O. Henry furniture found in this room and most of the available materials were donated by Judge Trueman E. O'Quinn while other materials were acquired from Jenny Lind Porter, Ethel Hofer, the Maddox family, the Austin Heritage Society, and the Austin History Center Association.

=== Reading Room ===
The Reading Room, located to the right of the lobby, is where visitors may reside while reviewing their research. This room features broadloom carpet, original tables and chairs from 1933, as well as table lamps specifically designed for this room during the 1980s renovation by Bell, Klein & Hoffman. The exterior walls of this room feature large arched windows, while the room is divided by floor to ceiling columns with brackets in the corners. Half wall shelving exists between the columns to separate the research area from the reference material space.
