= Blue Bonnet Court =

- Bluebonnet Tourist Camp
- U.S. National Register of Historic Places
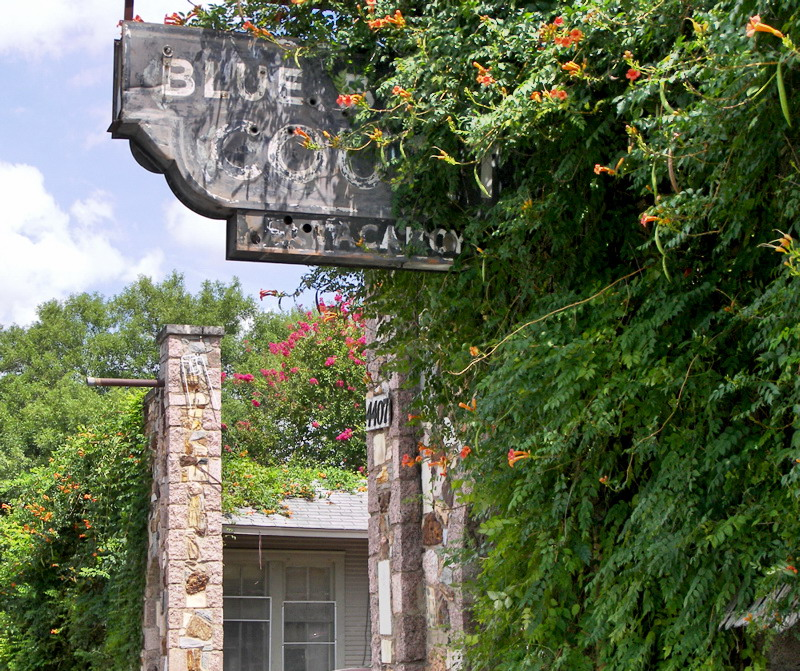
- The dilapidated neon sign of the Blue Bonnet Court in 2007.
- Location: Austin, TX
- Coordinates: 30°18′36.75″N 97°43′58.24″W
- Built: 1929
- Architect: Brydson Lumber Co.
- MPS: Hyde Park MPS
- NRHP reference No.: 90001188
- Added to NRHP: August 16, 1990

The Blue Bonnet Court, originally called the Bluebonnet Tourist Camp, is a historic motor court-style motel in north-central Austin, Texas. It is located at 4407 Guadalupe Street, Austin, Texas.

The lot where it stands originally belonged to the Missouri, Kansas and Texas Land Company. In 1925 the land was then purchased by the Halls and had several owners over four years until Elizabeth and Joe Lucas purchased the land for $1,000 in February 1929.

Joe and Elizabeth Lucas then hired the Brydson Lumber Company to construct the Bluebonnet Tourist Camp in anticipation of upcoming traffic along Guadalupe Street, which was paved in 1930. The location was highly sought-after, given its proximity to the Austin State Hospital psychiatric facility (now known as Austin State Hospital) across the street, and was also conveniently located along Guadalupe Street, which at the time was the only route connecting Austin to Dallas.

The motel is situated on the northwestern corner of the Hyde Park subdivision along what was then the main road out of town. In the 1930s it featured Austin's first neon sign, which still hangs from the front (though in a dilapidated condition).

Blue Bonnet Court features a stone wall in front with 11 basic rooms and attached covered parking. The rooms are rented today as efficiency apartments.

It was added to the National Register of Historic Places in 1990.

== See also ==
- List of motels
