= Cox–Craddock House =

Historic house in Texas, United States

- U.S. National Register of Historic Places
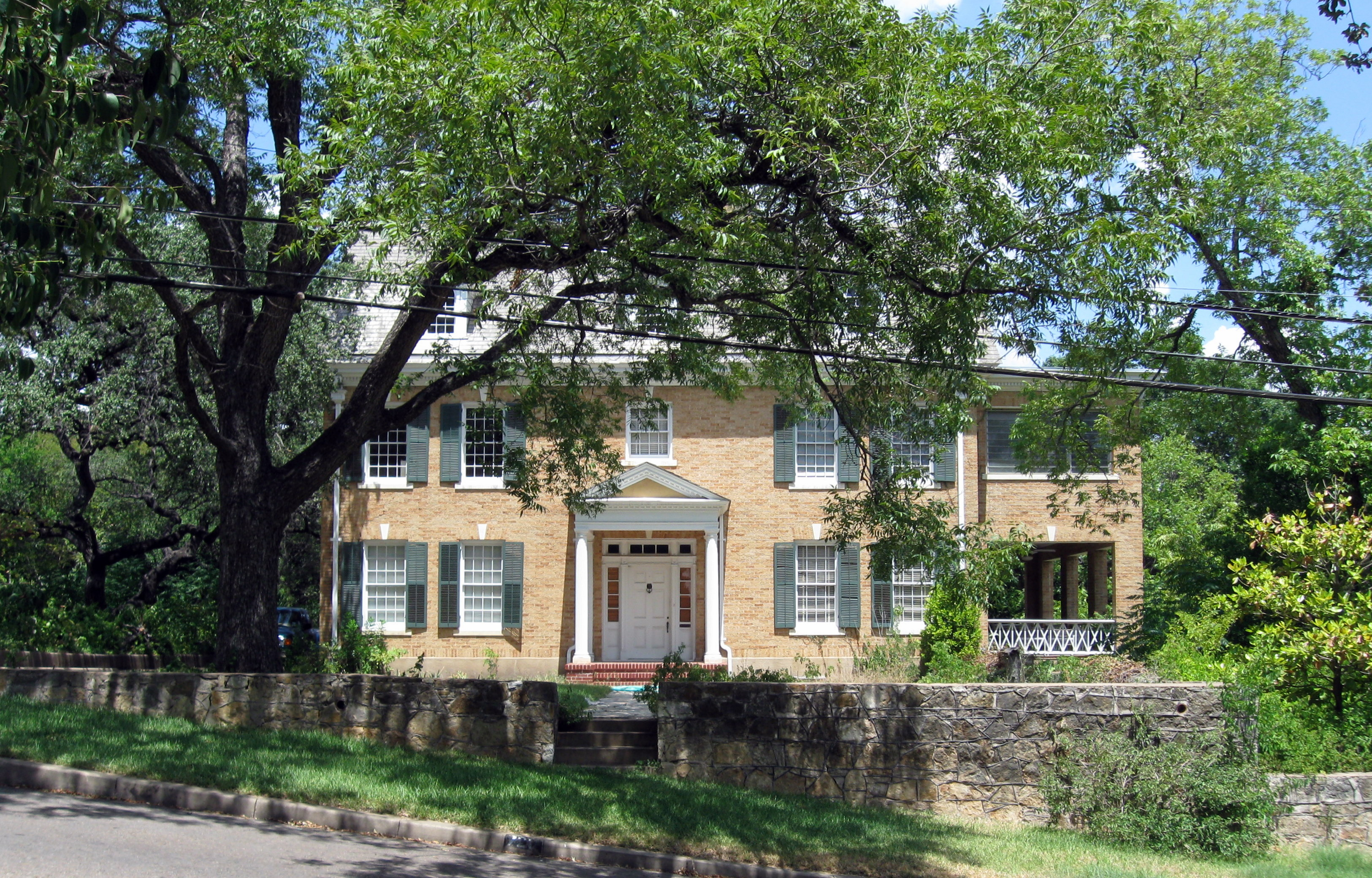
- Front of the house

- Location within Texas Location within the United States
- Location: 720 E. 32nd St., Austin, Texas
- Coordinates: 30°17′32″N 97°43′46″W
- Area: less than one acre
- Built: 1928
- Architect: Kuehne, Hugo Franz
- Architectural style: Colonial Revival
- NRHP reference No.: 01000612
- Added to NRHP: May 30, 2001

The Cox–Craddock House is a historic Colonial Revival-style house built in 1928 in Austin, Texas. It was designed by the architect Hugo Kuehne.

Robert A. and Linda Cox, the first owners of the house, were both economics professors at the University of Texas. Linda Cox sold the house in 1948 to Larry Inge Craddock, who had a variety of business interests in the city, including a miniature golf course and gas stations. Craddock enclosed the piazza and sleeping porch on the east end of the house. The current owner has restored the piazza to Kuehne's original open design and railing.

The home is located at 720 East 32nd Street. It was added to the National Register of Historic Places on May 30, 2001, as an excellent example of a Colonial Revival residence. It is built of brick and has a "symmetrical composition" in which a "pedimented portico forms the prominent central entry." The side-gabled roof is pierced on the front side by three pedimented dormers.

The design by Hugo Kuehne included a porte cochere which was not built.
