= Page–Gilbert House =

Historic house in Texas, United States

- U.S. National Register of Historic Places
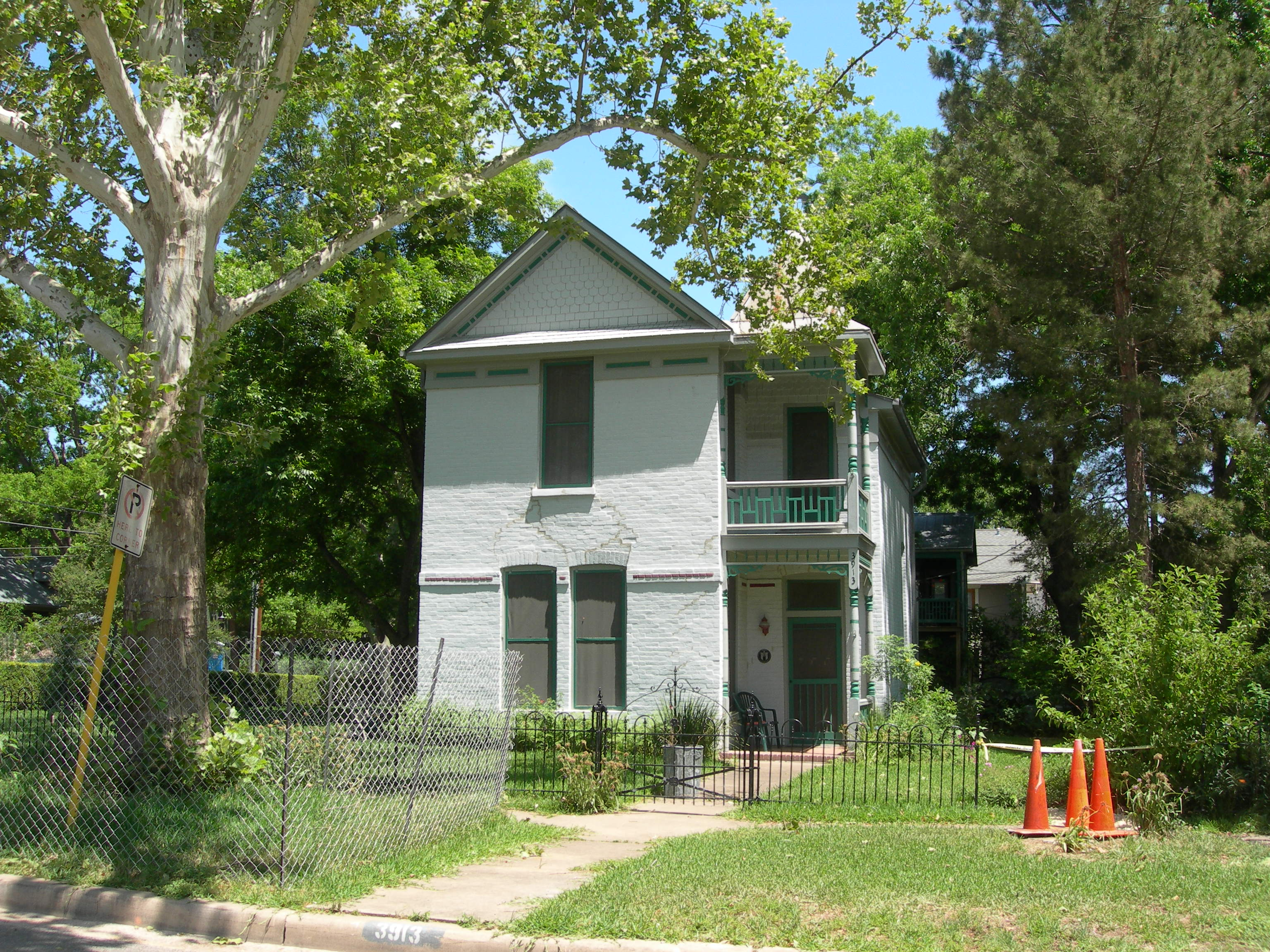
- Location: 3913 Ave. G Austin, Texas, USA
- Coordinates: 30°18′06.80″N 97°43′47.82″W
- Architect: Christopher H. Page
- Architectural style: Queen Anne
- MPS: Hyde Park MPS
- NRHP reference No.: 90001186
- Added to NRHP: August 16, 1990

The Page–Gilbert House is a historic home in the Hyde Park Historic District in Austin, Texas, United States.

It was built in the late 19th century by its first owner, Christopher Page, a British immigrant who had worked as a stonemason in constructing the Texas State Capitol. It features a muted Victorian style with Queen Anne accents, such as a pyramidal steeple roof.

The house is located at 3913 Avenue G, across from the Frank M. and Annie G. Covert House. It was added to the National Register of Historic Places in 1990.

== See also ==
- Gilbert House (disambiguation)
