= Hildreth–Flanagan–Heierman House =

Historic house in Texas, United States

- U.S. National Register of Historic Places
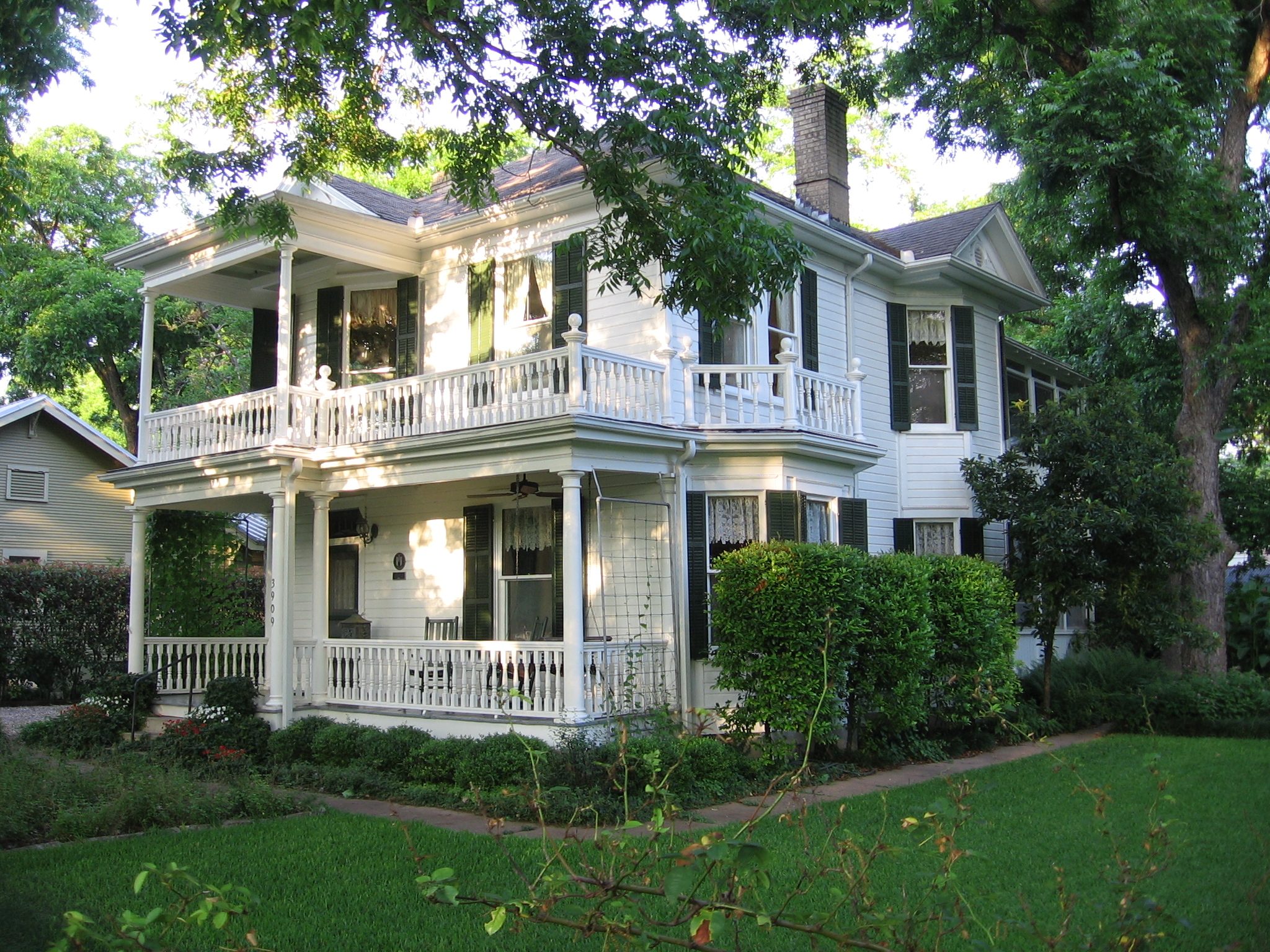
- Location: 3909 Ave. G Austin, Texas, USA
- Coordinates: 30°18′05.78″N 97°43′48.45″W
- Built: 1902
- Architect: William Voss, Sr.
- MPS: Hyde Park MPS
- NRHP reference No.: 90001184
- Added to NRHP: August 16, 1990

The Hildreth–Flanagan–Heierman House is a historic home in the Hyde Park historic district in Austin, Texas.

The home was completed in 1902 by master builder William Voss Sr., for owner Charles A. Hildreth, at a total cost of $2,718. The house combines features of the Queen Anne and Colonial Revival styles.

The house is located at 3909 Avenue G. It was added to the National Register of Historic Places in 1990.
