= Smith–Marcuse–Lowry House =

Historic house in Texas, United States

- U.S. National Register of Historic Places
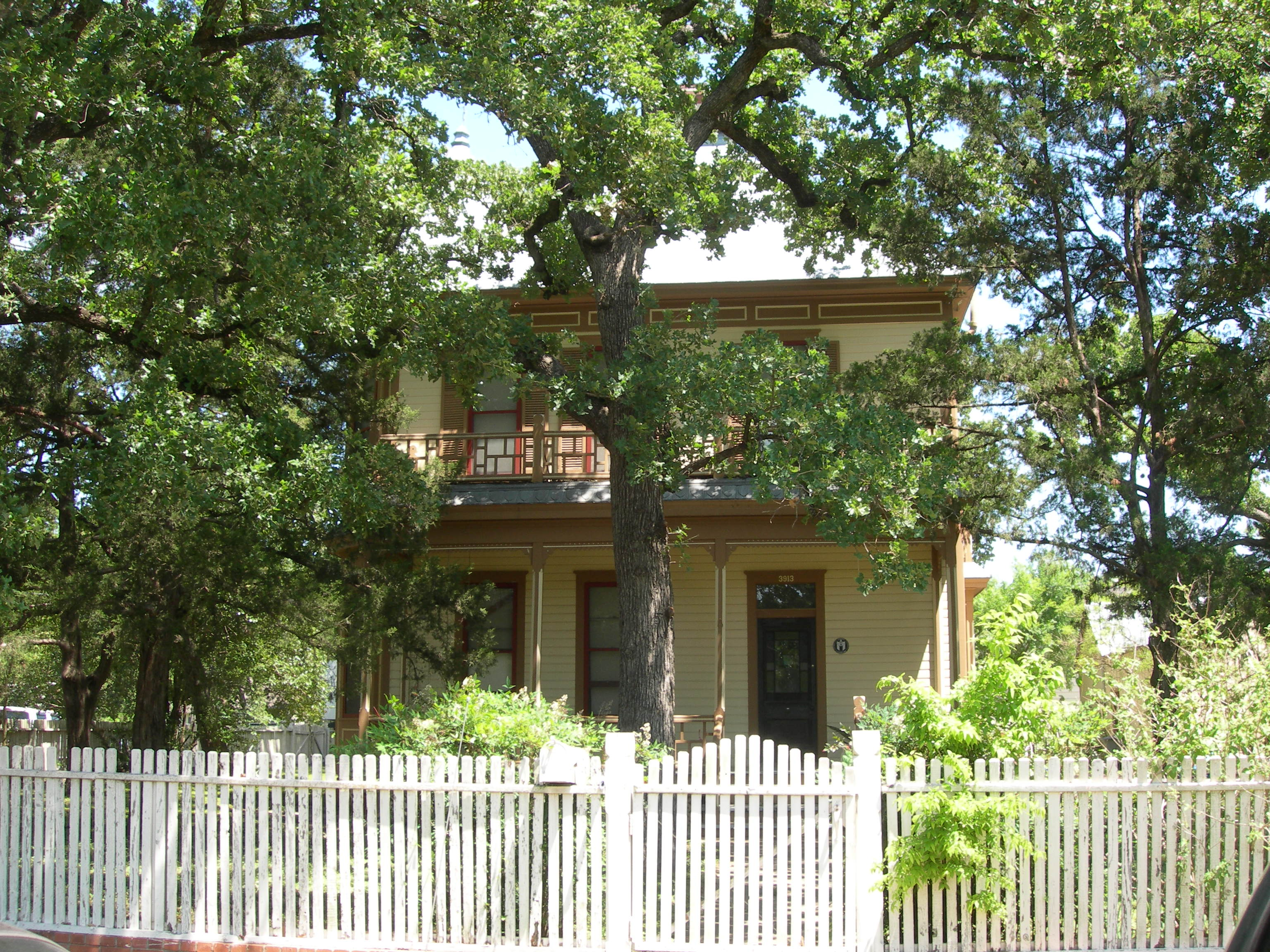
- Location: 3913 Ave. C Austin, Texas, United States
- Coordinates: 30°18′12.88″N 97°44′01.31″W
- Built: 1894
- Architect: John Geggie
- Architectural style: Queen Anne Texas Victorian
- MPS: Hyde Park MPS
- NRHP reference No.: 90001180
- Added to NRHP: August 16, 1990

The Smith–Marcuse–Lowry House is an historic home in the Hyde Park neighborhood in Austin, Texas.

The house's original footprint was square, with two stories. It had a cedar shingle roof upon its completion. At the time of its construction, it was built with all the modern conveniences for its time period. The house was wired for electric light, featured a gas fireplace-in-the-round for heating, transoms and double hung windows for circulation and had a water collection and retention system. Texas Victorian homes have much less ornate scrollwork than traditional Victorian homes, yet the work is still interesting. The porch railings and decorative elements of the Marcuse–Lowry home have been retained or reproduced in their original form. The house is located at 3913 Avenue C. It was added to the National Register of Historic Places in 1990.
