= Hugo Kuehne =

American architect and city planner (1884–1963)

Hugo Franz Kuehne
- Born: February 20, 1884; Austin, Texas
- Died: November 23, 1963 (aged 79); Austin, Texas
- Occupations: Architect, city planner
- Notable work: Austin History Center; Ritz Theater; Cox-Craddock House

Hugo Franz Kuehne FAIA (February 20, 1884 – November 23, 1963) was an architect and city planner who practiced in Austin, Texas.

== Life and career ==
Kuehne was born in Austin on February 20, 1884. He was the youngest son of Franz and Langer Kuehne, immigrants from Germany. He took a BSc Civil Engineering from the University of Texas at Austin, and a BSc Architecture from MIT, where he was trained in the tradition of the École des Beaux-Arts. After graduating in 1908, he worked in Boston, for George Henri Desmond, before being asked to organize an architecture program in the College of Engineering of the University of Texas in 1910. He served as an adjunct professor at the university from 1910 until 1915, when he entered private practice. Other than a period of work for the Department of the Interior during the Great Depression, he continued in the private practice of architecture until retiring in 1961.

Kuehne married Sybil Glass in 1923. They had two children, including a son with whom the elder Kuehne was in partnership at the close of his career. He died in Austin on November 23, 1963.

== Architectural works ==
Among Kuehne's most noted works is Austin Public Library (now the Austin History Center). His other significant commercial projects in Austin include the Bohn Brothers building (1929), the Ritz Theater (1929), the Steck Building (1932), the Commodore Perry Hotel (1950), the International Life Building (1952), the American National Bank, and the Texas Department of Public Safety building (1952). He also designed alterations for Brackenridge Hospital, completed in 1933, and buildings for the Austin State Hospital.

Kuehne led a team that designed a number of large houses in the Neoclassical and Colonial Revival styles. One notable example of these houses is the Cox-Craddock House, a Colonial Revival house 720 East 32nd Street built in 1928 and listed on the National Register of Historic Places on May 30, 2001. Kuehne designed the house for Robert A. and Linda Cox, both economics professors at the University of Texas. A subsequent owner, businessman Larry Inge Craddock, enclosed the piazza and sleeping porch on the east end of the house. The current owner has restored the piazza to Kuehne's original open design and railing. The Cox-Craddock is built of brick and has a "symmetrical composition, 12:12 windows framed by a stone keystone and flat brick arch above and a stone sill. Three pedimented dormers with round-arched Gothic-mullioned windows pierce the front of the sidegabled roof. A pedimented portico forms the prominent central entry; the door is framed with sidelights and a transom." Hugo Kuehne's design also included a porte cochere which was not built.

== City planning ==
Kuehne was also involved with city planning for Austin, collaborating with Koch & Fowler (a Dallas consulting firm) on the 1928 Austin city plan.

== Awards and recognitions ==
In 1944 he was named a Fellow of the American Institute of Architects in honor of outstanding achievements and awarded a life membership of the American Society of Planning Officials. The City of Austin named him "Austin's Most Worthy Citizen" in 1954 by the Austin Real Estate Board and received a tribute from the Austin City Council
