= Frank M. and Annie G. Covert House =

Historic house in Texas, United States

- U.S. National Register of Historic Places
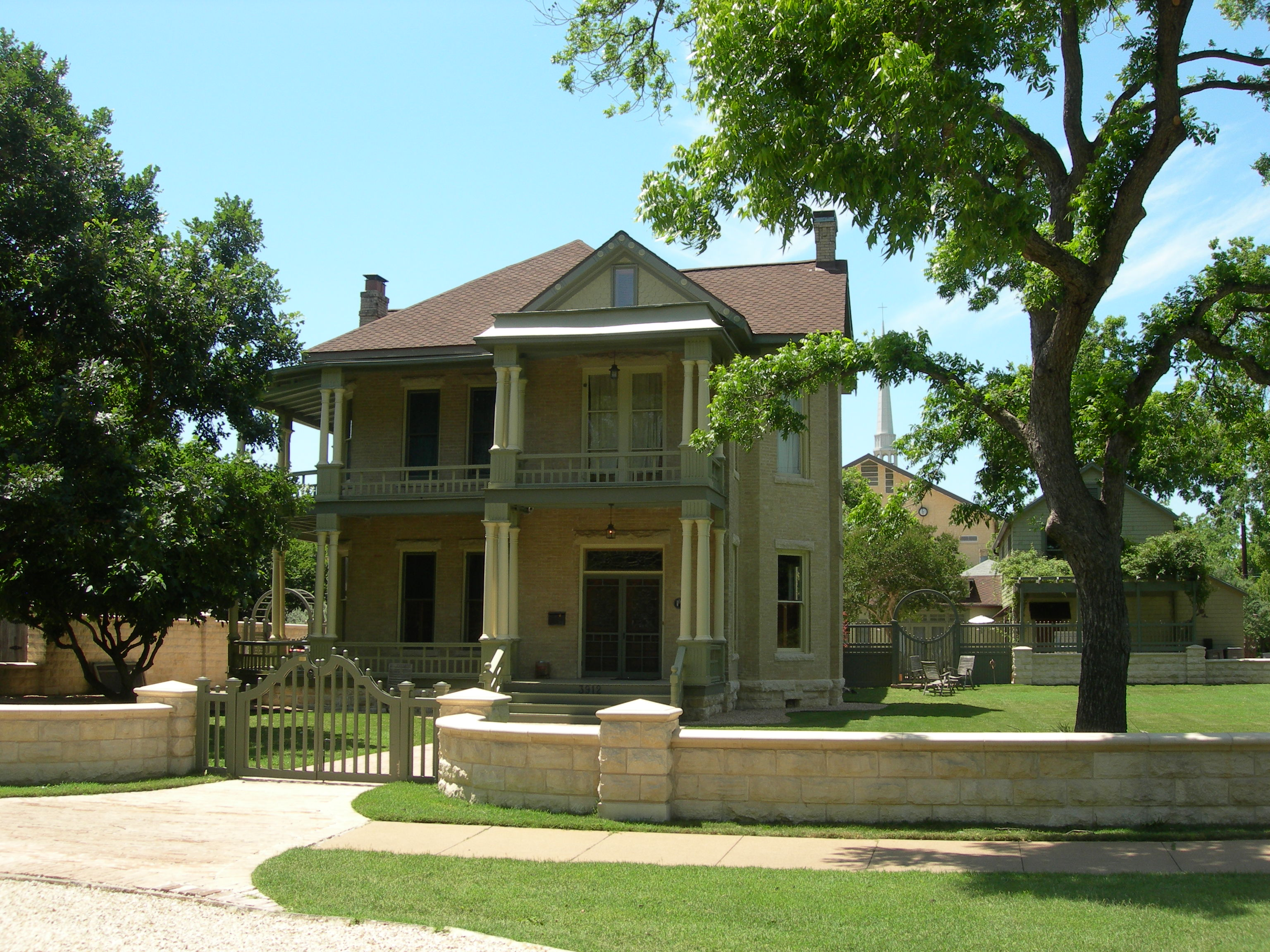
- Location: 3912 Ave. G Austin, Texas, USA
- Coordinates: 30°18′07.36″N 97°43′50.10″W
- Built: 1898
- MPS: Hyde Park MPS
- NRHP reference No.: 90001185
- Added to NRHP: August 16, 1990

The Frank M. and Annie G. Covert House is a historic home in the Hyde Park Historic District in Austin, Texas, United States.

The building was completed circa 1898 by local real estate broker and auto dealer Frank Covert. Like other homes in the neighborhood, it includes an eclectic combination of styles, including a Queen Anne form and Romanesque and Classical Revival details. The house features irregular massing, a two-story wraparound veranda and masonry construction, unusual in Hyde Park.

According to information compiled by Peter Flagg Maxson, architectural historian, the Covert House had many owners in the 20th century. Under the Sassman ownership (1917–1945) it was rented out to, among others, Robert Winslow and the House of the Holy Infancy, a home for unwed mothers.

In the 1970s the Covert House was acquired by several families, who tried group living there. After a period of some neglect, the property was acquired by Dr. John and Ann Horan, who restored it. It has since been sold on to another person.

The house is located at 3912 Avenue G, across from the Page-Gilbert House. It was added to the National Register of Historic Places in 1990.
