= Hyde Park (Austin, Texas) =

- Hyde Park Historic District
- U.S. National Register of Historic Places
- U.S. Historic district
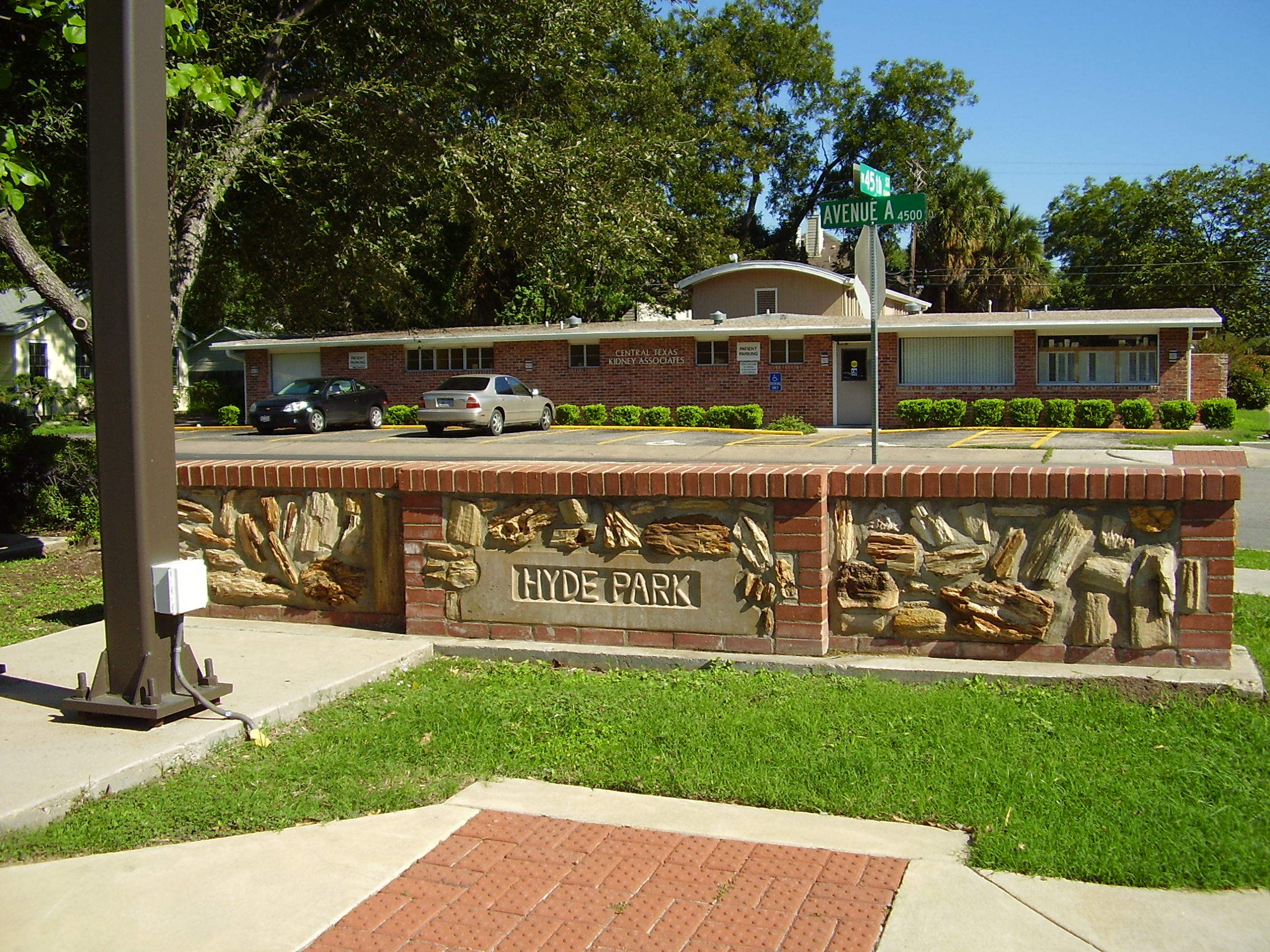
- Location: Roughly bounded by Guadalupe St., 45th St., Duval St., and 38th St., Austin, Texas
- Coordinates: 30°18′21″N 97°43′48″W
- Area: 138.5 acres (56.0 ha)
- Architectural style: Tudor Revival, Bungalow/Craftsman, Queen Anne
- MPS: Hyde Park MPS
- NRHP reference No.: 90001191
- Added to NRHP: June 29, 1990

Hyde Park is a neighborhood and historic district in Austin, Texas. Located in Central Austin, Hyde Park is defined by 38th Street to the south, 45th Street to the north, Duval Street to the east, and Guadalupe Street to the west. It is situated just north of the University of Texas and borders the neighborhoods of Hancock and North Loop.

Hyde Park traces its origins back to 1891 and is considered to be Austin's first suburb. The neighborhood was originally developed by Monroe M. Shipe in 1891 as a "White Only" streetcar suburb with a large artificial lake, but it has since become one of the most densely populated areas in the city's urban core. Part of the neighborhood was listed on the National Register of Historic Places as a Historic District in 1990.

Hyde Park is located in city council District 9.

== History ==
Located approximately twenty blocks from Austin's original town site, the area now known as Hyde Park was largely rural in character for much of the 19th century. The State Fair of Texas was held in the eastern sections of Hyde Park from 1875 until it was moved to Dallas in 1884. A portion of the State Fair's horseracing track is still reflected in the curved segment of 39th Street between Avenue F and Duval Street.

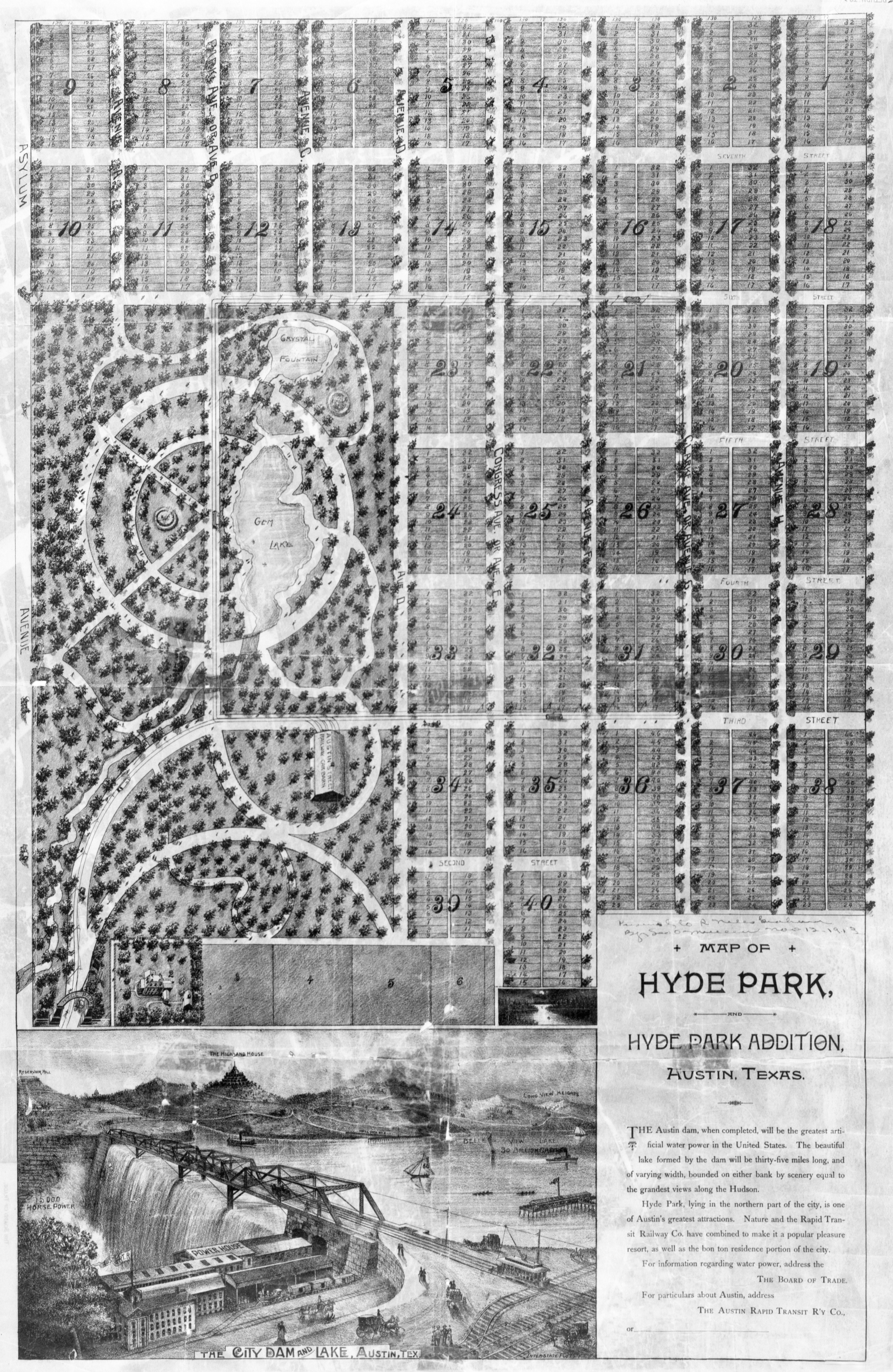
Early promotional map of Hyde Park

Established in 1891 by the Missouri, Kansas and Texas Land and Town Company, Hyde Park was marketed under the direction of Monroe Martin Shipe as a majority-white, affluent suburb featuring large, majestic residences, separate from the racially integrated neighborhoods of the city. Ads touted Hyde Park as "free from nuisances and an objectionable class of people, proper restrictions being taken to guard against undesirable occupants." Critical to the suburb's success was the establishment of an electric streetcar system. After the City Council awarded Shipe a franchise in 1890, his Austin Rapid Transit Railway Company built its first line on Congress Avenue, west on Sixth Street, and north on Rio Grande Street and Old Georgetown Road (now Guadalupe Street) to Hyde Park.

Hyde Park was initially marketed to Austin's elite in the 1890s, and Shipe achieved moderate success. The first houses built in the neighborhood were stylistic examples of late 19th-century domestic architecture. Many of them, such as the Oliphant-Walker House, were built in the Queen Anne style by locally prominent citizens. Noted sculptor Elisabet Ney was among the first to buy property in the area, which was heavily promoted as confirmation that Hyde Park was attractive to Austin's most talented and prestigious citizens. Ney built a small castle-style studio, named Formosa, in northwest Hyde Park that is now home to the Elisabet Ney Museum.

By the late 1890s and early 1900s, however, the tone of Hyde Park's advertisements began to change. No longer was it promoted as an affluent residential area; instead, the suburb was described as an ideal place for the "working man or woman" to invest his or her earnings by purchasing a lot and building a residence. The key phrase in these promotions became affordability. Hyde Park's architectural character shifted to smaller, more modest frame houses and bungalows. While steady construction of houses characterized the area through the early 1900s, Hyde Park's greatest building boom occurred between 1924 and 1935. Shipe Park was dedicated in 1928.

Analysis of styles and dates of construction of domestic structures elucidates historic growth patterns within Hyde Park. The oldest houses are located near the State Hospital or along the former streetcar route on 40th Street. Later, as promotional emphasis shifted to a different socioeconomic group, more modest dwellings were constructed in areas somewhat removed from the streetcar line.

Today, Hyde Park consists of mostly renovated bungalow-style homes, and modern duplex-style residences, many with bright colors and unorthodox decorations, due in part to the residents preserving the city's informal "Keep Austin Weird" slogan. All street signs in Hyde Park are dedicated to its historical identity. Many "Austinites" consider Hyde Park Austin, TX's most locally cultured neighborhood.

== Historic districts ==
The Hyde Park neighborhood contains two historic districts and several other individual historic buildings listed on the National Register of Historic Places. The Hyde Park Historic District is roughly defined by West 40th Street to the south, West 45th Street to the north, Duval Street to the east, and Avenue A to the west. The district includes Victorian architecture, Tudor Revival architecture, and bungalows.

The Shadow Lawn Historic District in southeast Hyde Park is roughly bounded by 38th Street, 39th Street, Avenue G, and Duval Street. The district includes several homes of historic interest from the early twentieth century.

=== Historic buildings in Hyde Park ===
- Blue Bonnet Court
- Elisabet Ney Museum
- Col. Monroe M. Shipe House
- Hildreth-Flanagan-Heierman House
- Frank M. and Annie G. Covert House
- Page-Gilbert House
- Smith-Marcuse-Lowry House
- Oliphant-Walker House
- Peter and Clotilde Shipe Mansbendel House

== Real Estate and Housing Market Trends ==
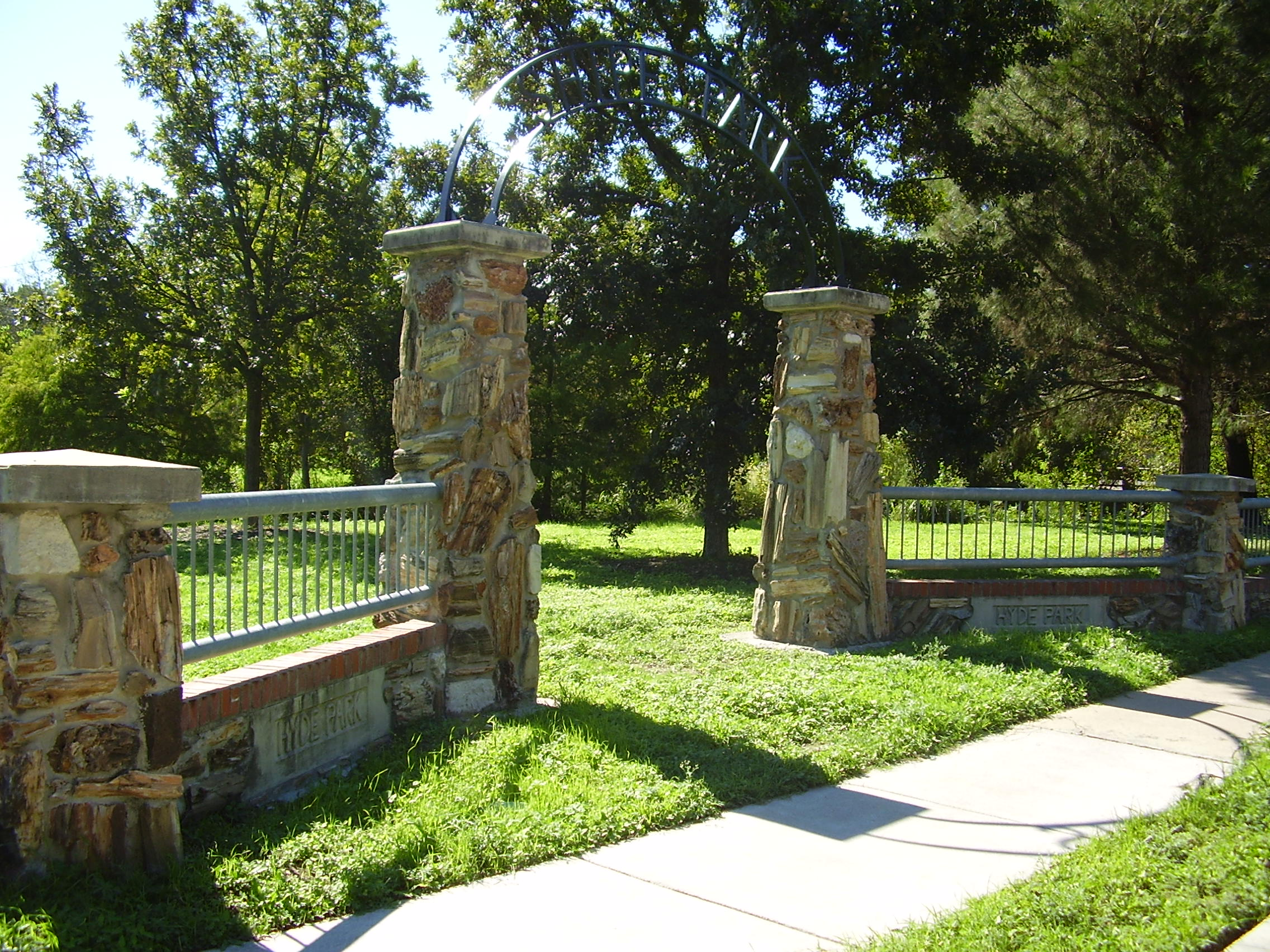
Shipe Park

Residential properties are the most prominent property type in Hyde Park, with single-family dwellings comprising about 95 percent of the neighborhood's built environment. Most lots within the neighborhood were improved between the late 1890s and 1935. Houses built during that period reflect the architectural tastes, trends and patterns that prevailed in Austin at the time. Bungalows are the most common house type, followed by examples of the stylistic influences of the Queen Anne and Tudor Revival styles.

As Austin grew, Hyde Park once again underwent a boom of sorts. From 2001 to 2007, the median home price rose by nearly $70,000 to $320,000. Despite the housing market crash in 2008-2009, homes regained their values and as of July 2013 the median home price was $350,000 with some properties selling for over $1.5 million.

The 1.75-acre (7,100 m^{2}) Shipe Park is located in Hyde Park. Shipe Park has two unlighted basketball courts, one multipurpose court, two picnic tables, one playground, a 444-square-yard neighborhood swimming pool, two lighted tennis courts, and indoor toilet facilities.

== Education ==
Residents are served by the Austin Independent School District. Residents are assigned to Lee Elementary School, Kealing Middle School, and McCallum High School. The area is also served by Hyde Park Schools.

Sri Atmananda Memorial School, a private school, was in Hyde Park.
