= Shadow Lawn Historic District (Austin, Texas) =

Historic house in Texas, United States

- U.S. National Register of Historic Places
- U.S. Historic district
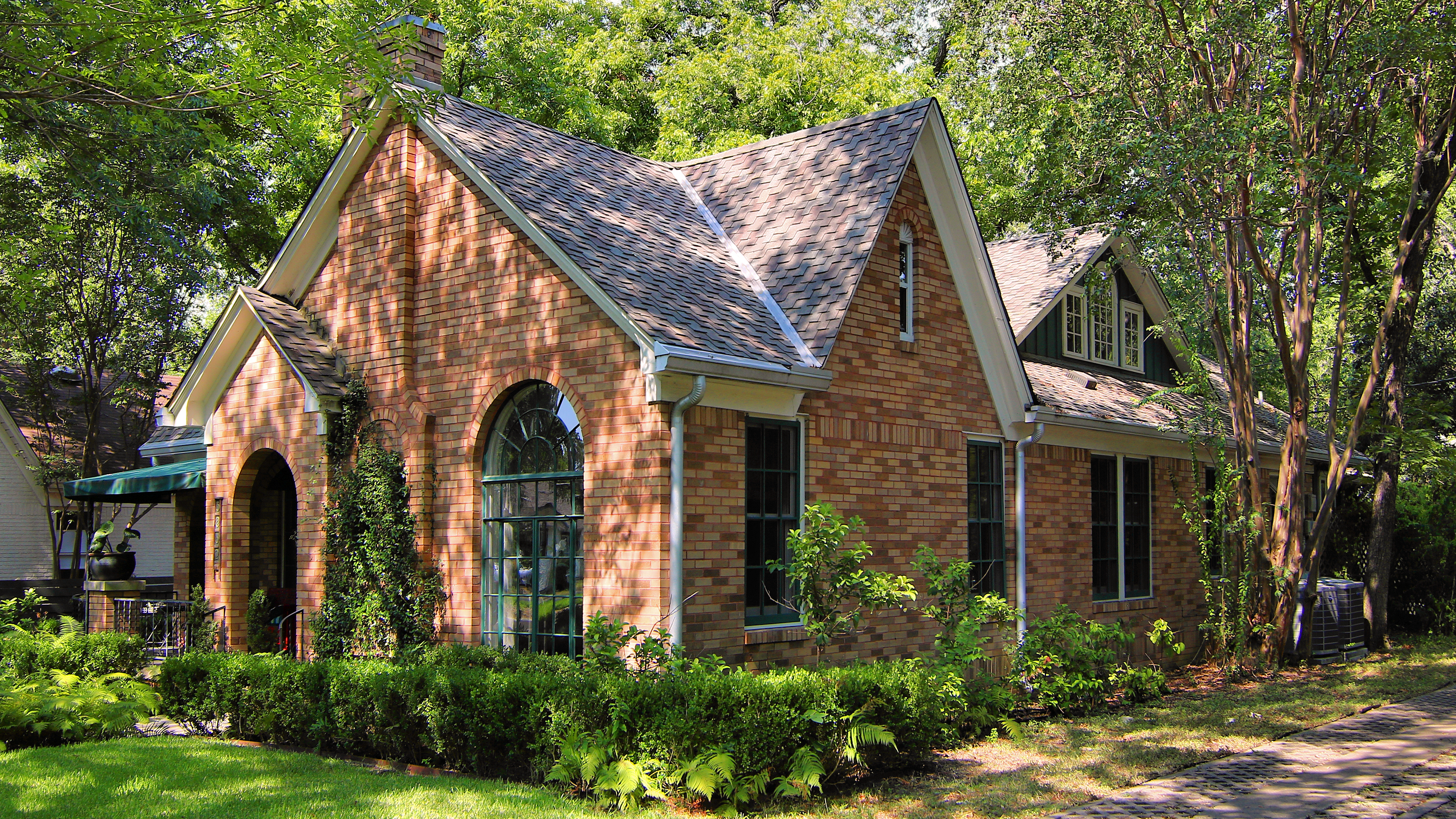
- An example of the Tudor Revival style houses in the district.
- Location: Austin, Texas
- Coordinates: 30°17′59″N 97°43′49″W
- Built: 1920s-1940s
- Architect: Charles H. Page, Fred A. Dale
- Architectural style: Bungalow, Tudor Revival
- NRHP reference No.: 90001192
- Added to NRHP: August 16, 1990

The Shadow Lawn Historic District is a historic district in central Austin, Texas that has a cohesive collection of houses built in the southeast portion of Hyde Park during the late 1920s and 1930s. The district is bounded by north side of 38th Street, south side of 39th Street, east side of Avenue G, and west side of Duval Street The district was added to the National Register of Historic Places in 1990.

Shadow Lawn's historical significance stems from the architecture of its houses. The district features a number of dwellings with modest Tudor Revival detailing characteristic of historicist "cottage" bungalows built in the 1930s. The dominance of this architectural form is an important feature that distinguishes the district from nearby housing clusters, as no other area in the northern suburbs of Austin contains as high a concentration of Tudor Revival dwellings. Unlike the bungalows in the nearby Hyde Park Historic District, these houses utilized more expensive masonry veneer rather than cheaper wood siding.

== Education ==
Residents are served by the Austin Independent School District. Residents are assigned to Lee Elementary School, Kealing Middle School, and McCallum High School.

== See also ==
Hyde Park Historic District (Austin, Texas)
