= Central East Austin, Austin, Texas =

Central East Austin
- Neighborhood
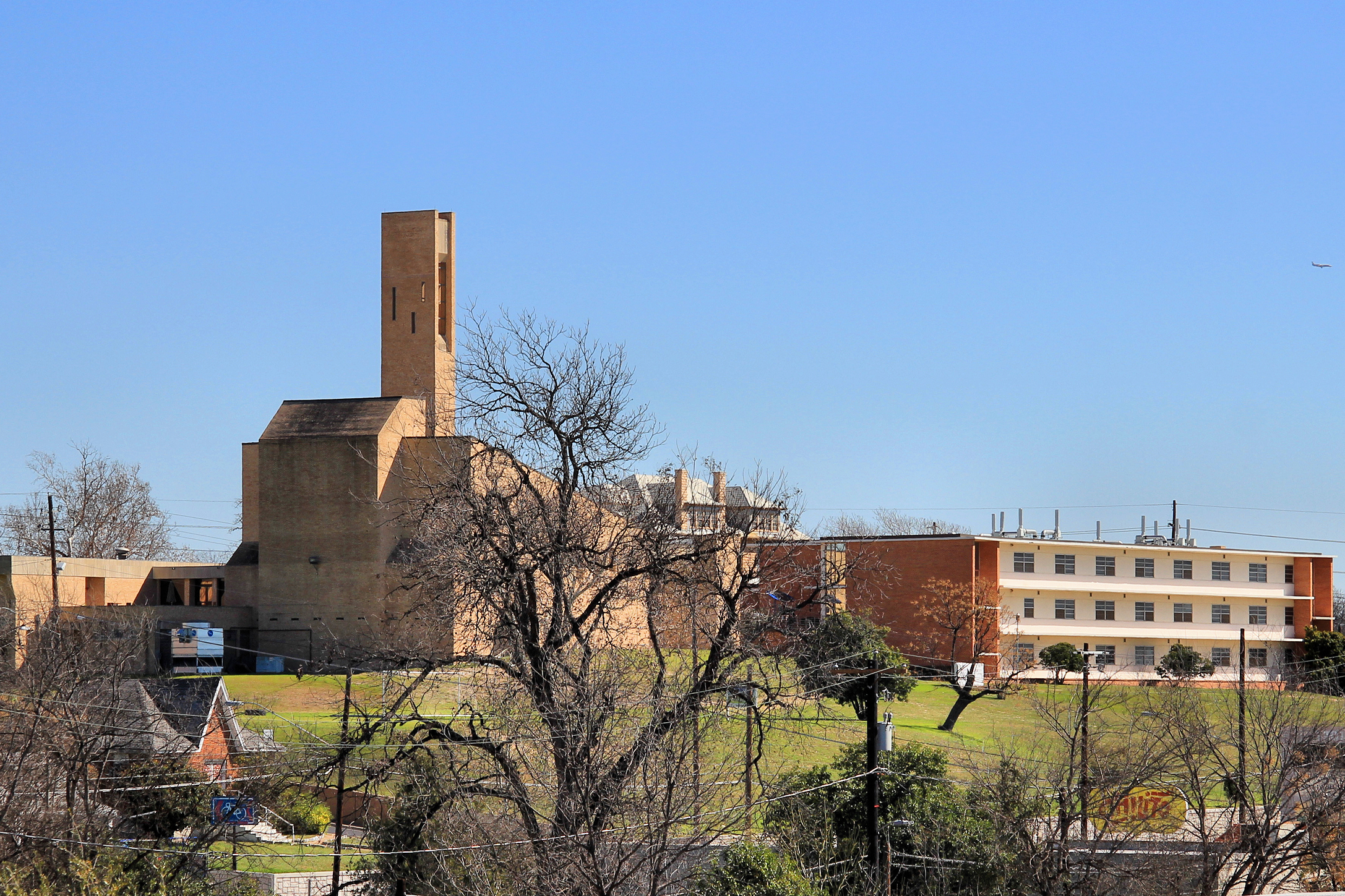
- Huston–Tillotson University in Central East Austin
- Neighborhood Boundaries
- Coordinates: 30°16′18″N 97°43′30″W
- Country: United States
- State: Texas
- City: Austin
- Time zone: UTC-6 (CST)
  - Summer (DST): UTC-5 (CDT)
- ZIP Codes: 78702
- Area codes: 512, 737

Central East Austin is a neighborhood in Austin, Texas, United States. The neighborhood is bounded to the south by East 7th Street, to the west by Interstate 35, to the north by East Martin Luther King Jr Boulevard and to the east by Chicon Street, Rosewood Avenue and Northwestern Avenue.

== History ==
The 1928 Austin city plan set East Avenue, the site of present day Interstate 35, as the dividing line between "white Austin" and "Black Austin". African-American Austinites living west of East Avenue were denied access to public services and utilities in hopes they would be influenced to move to the city's east side. As a result of this segregation, Central East Austin is one of the city's historically Black neighborhoods and is home to many of Austin's Black institutions.

== Education ==
=== Public primary and secondary education ===
Central East Austin is part of the Austin Independent School District. Blackshear Elementary School, Kealing Middle School, and Garza Independence High School are located in the neighborhood.

=== Higher education ===
The Huston–Tillotson University campus is located in Central East Austin.

== Recreation ==
Central East Austin is home to two small "pocket" parks: Lott Pocket Park and Swede Hill Pocket Park.

== Culture ==
Notable areas of the neighborhood include the Texas State Cemetery, the Oakwood Cemetery, and the Swedish Hill Historic District.

Historic buildings in the area include the Victory Grill, the Genaro P. and Carolina Briones House, the Southgate-Lewis House, the Connelly-Yerwood House, Arnold Bakery, the Haehnel Building, and the Wesley United Methodist Church. The French Legation Museum, the Texas Music Museum, and the George Washington Carver Museum and Cultural Center are among the neighborhood's cultural amenities.

The nonprofit organization Six Square was founded in 2013 to preserve the Black cultural heritage of Central East Austin, including many of the neighborhood's historical buildings.
