= Arnold Bakery =

- Arnold Bakery Building
- U.S. National Register of Historic Places
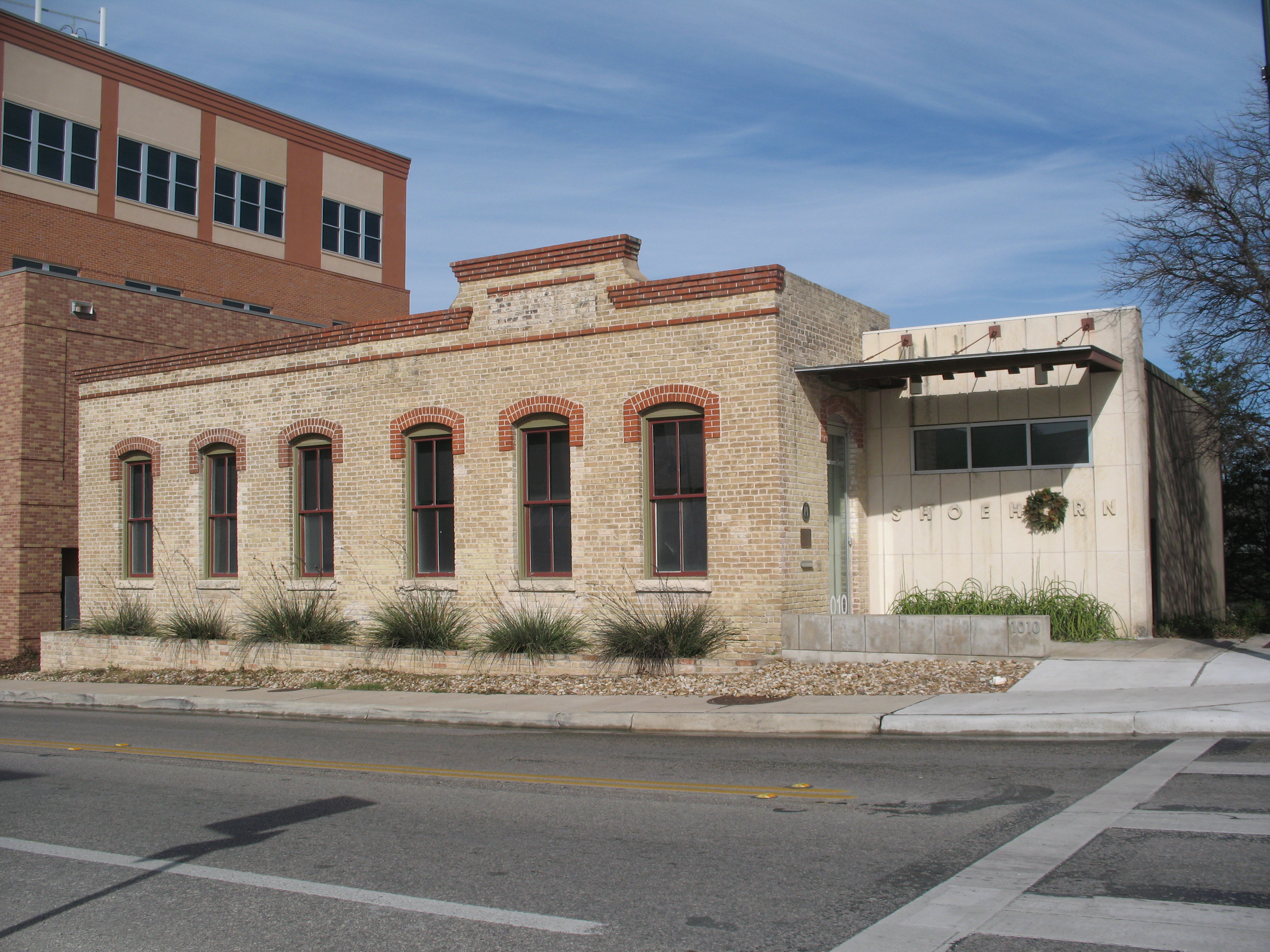
- Arnold Bakery in 2009.

- Location within Texas Location within the United States
- Location: 1010 E. Eleventh St; Austin, Texas, USA
- Coordinates: 30°16′9″N 97°43′46″W
- Built: c. 1890
- NRHP reference No.: 03001416
- Added to NRHP: January 14, 2004

The Arnold Bakery Building is a historic commerce building in east-central Austin, Texas constructed around 1890.

In addition to being a bakery, the building served many other purposes throughout the 20th century for the African-American community before falling into disrepair. In 2000, the building was bought and renovated for a design studio as part of a local urban renewal project.

The building was added to the National Register of Historic Places in 2004.

== Notes ==
- Austin Revitalization Authority: Historic preservation
