= Connelly–Yerwood House =

Historic house in Texas, United States

- Connolly –Yerwood House
- U.S. National Register of Historic Places
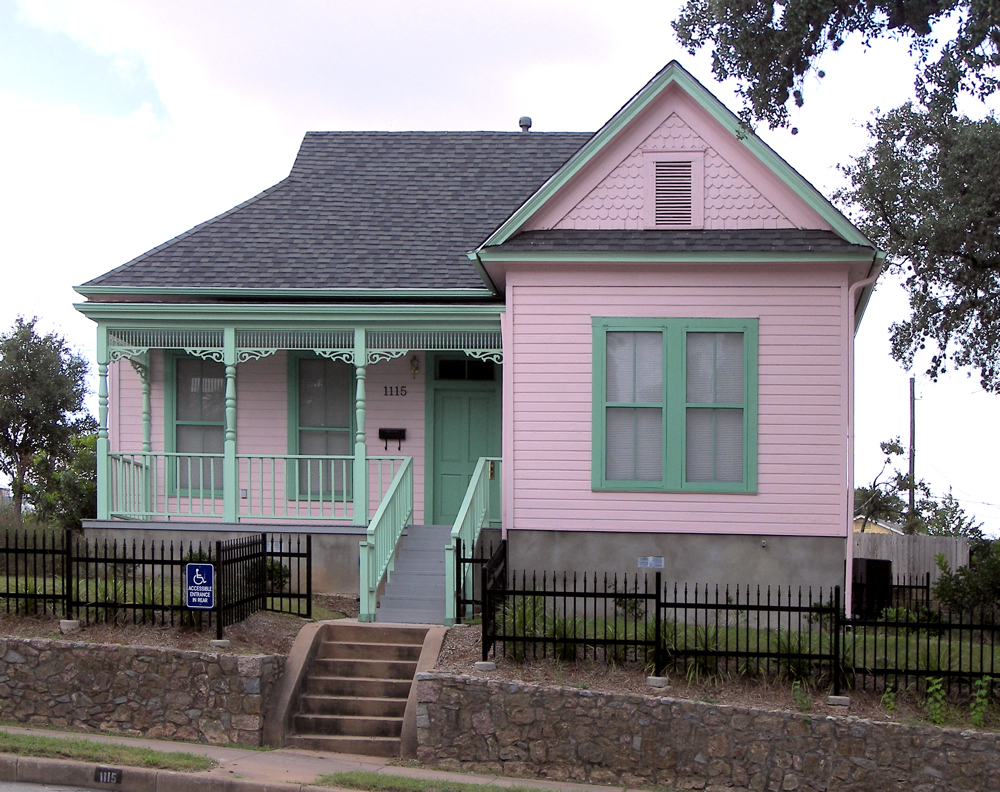
- Connolly–Yerwood House 2007
- Location: Austin, TX
- Coordinates: 30°16′20″N 97°43′42″W
- Built: 1904
- Architectural style: Late Victorian
- NRHP reference No.: 03000279
- Added to NRHP: April 18, 2003

The Connolly–Yerwood House, is an Eastlake-style cottage located in Austin, Texas. The structure was built in 1904 for Kate and Michael Connolly and their nine children. In addition to his occupation as a stonemason and bricklayer, Connolly owned the Silver King Saloon at 307 E. Sixth Street. Eventually the population of the neighborhood began to change, as communities served by Samuel Huston College and St. Peter's M.E. Church were moving into the area. In 1926 the Connollys sold their home to an African-American doctor, Charles R. Yerwood, and his wife Nan. The Yerwoods divorced but Nan Yerwood continued to live in the house; she sold the south portion of the lot where their garage was located; three homes were later constructed on this lot. Daughter Connie Yerwood Odom later occupied the house. Prominent in the public health field in Texas, Dr. Connie Yerwood achieved many "firsts" - as a woman and as an African-American. Following Dr. Connie Yerwood, other family members owned and occupied the house through the 1990s when the structure and land was purchased by Anderson Community Development Corporation.

In the late 1920s or early 1930s the house was enlarged to nine rooms, the original rear porch enclosed and the west half extended to include the present kitchen and dining room. Additional changes occurred in the 1950s when two bathrooms and a bedroom were added. The exterior was also altered when the front porch was shortened and pink composition siding with green trim was applied. The color scheme a nod to Alpha Kappa Alpha sorority of which Dr. Connie Yerwood was a member.

In 2000, ownership of the property was transferred to the City of Austin - Office of Neighborhood Housing and Community Development. The structure was renovated and restored. Renovations began with replacement of the old pier and beam foundation which was in bad condition. The original floors have been preserved as well as other interior trim, including bathroom tiles. Using old photographs porch spindles and trim were reproduced and the house is once again wearing its fish-scale shingles. The project received a 2006 Heritage Society of Austin Merit Award.

The building, located at 1115 East 12th Street serves as the home office for Anderson Community Development Corporation. It was added to the National Register of Historic Places in 2003.
