= Swedish Hill Historic District =

Historic district in Texas, United States

- U.S. National Register of Historic Places
- U.S. Historic district
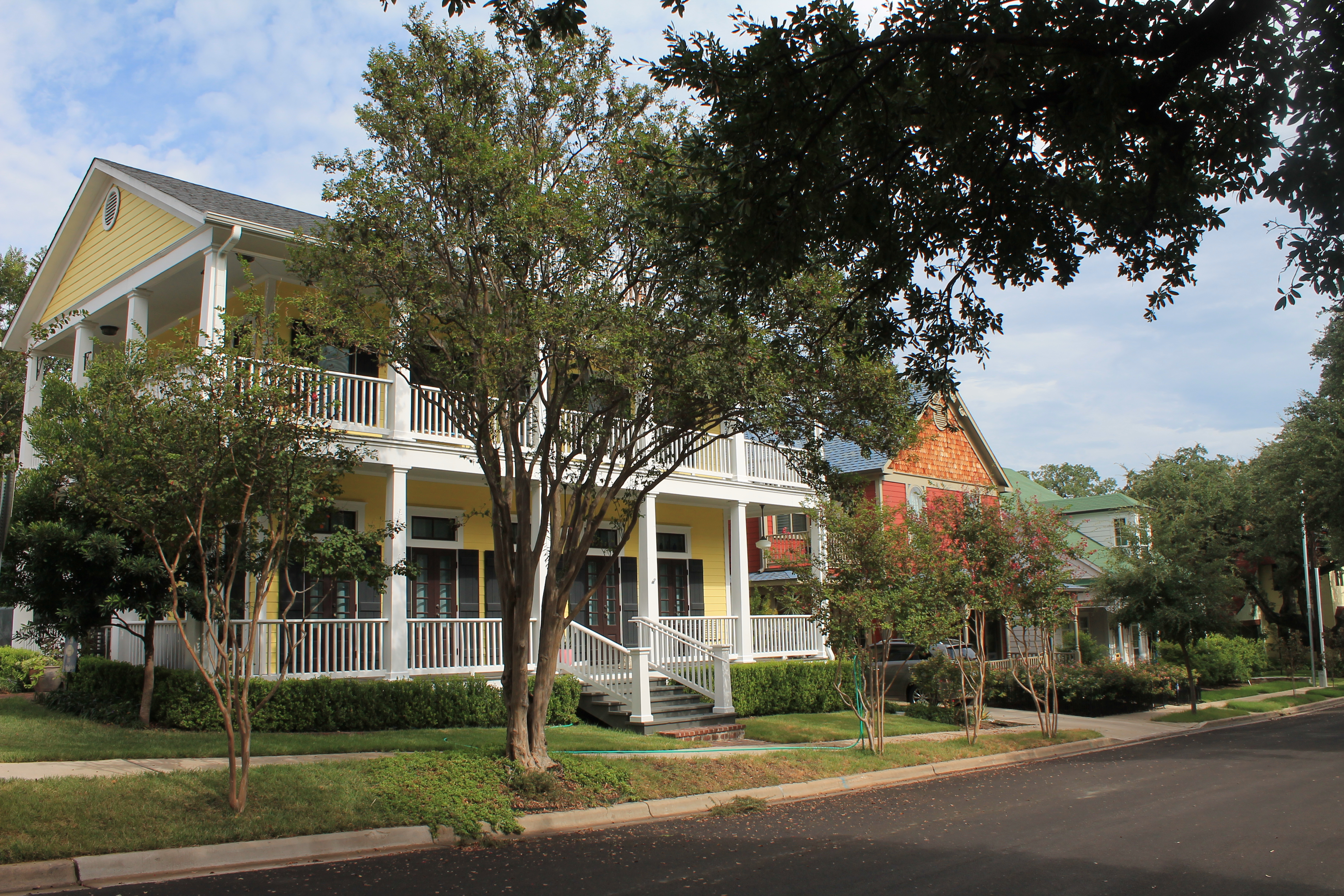
- Location: Austin, Texas
- Coordinates: 30°16′30″N 97°43′46″W
- Area: 40 acres (16 ha)
- Architect: Multiple
- Architectural style: Late Victorian
- MPS: East Austin MRA
- NRHP reference No.: 86001088
- Added to NRHP: May 12, 1986

The Swedish Hill Historic District is a former Swedish enclave that is now a residential area of downtown Austin, Texas. It is often referred to as "Swede Hill."

Development of this area began in the 1870s when numerous Swedish immigrants erected homes near their downtown businesses. The first to build his home there was S. A. Lundell; soon thereafter Carl John Swahn built his house there, and many others followed. Eventually some sixty-seven Swedish immigrant families built homes in the vicinity and the neighborhood became known as Svenska Kullen (Swedish Hill)—originally bounded by Waller Street on the east, Red River Street on the west, 15th Street on the south, and 19th Street on the north (today West Martin Luther King Jr. Boulevard — known more familiarly as Swede Hill.

== Background ==
These immigrants founded the first Swedish Methodist Church in Texas, and helped to establish Texas Wesleyan Academy (which would merge in 1934 with Texas Wesleyan College in Fort Worth), just north of the present-day University of Texas at Austin campus. Today the community comprises an eclectic mix of students and urban dwellers.

Over time, urban development, most notably the construction of I-35 and the Frank Erwin Center, shrunk the size of the community dramatically. In 1986, what remained was added to the National Register of Historic Places.

== Description and significance ==
Located on lots in the original City of Austin and subdivided and developed earlier than most other parts of East Austin, Swedish Hill was a residential neighborhood occupied by downtown business people and tradesmen. Its significance derives not only from the broad range of architectural styles which is represented in the District, but also from the fact that each building is an excellent example of its own particular style.

Architectural styles which are represented in the District are vernacular versions of the Victorian L plan, T plan, Cumberland plan, late Victorian corner-porch plan, Pyramidal plan, and Bungalow plan. All of the buildings are finely detailed; many display pleasing carpentry ornamentation in the forms of porch columns, balusters, railings, brackets, spindles, and a variety of siding and shingling types.

== Photo gallery ==
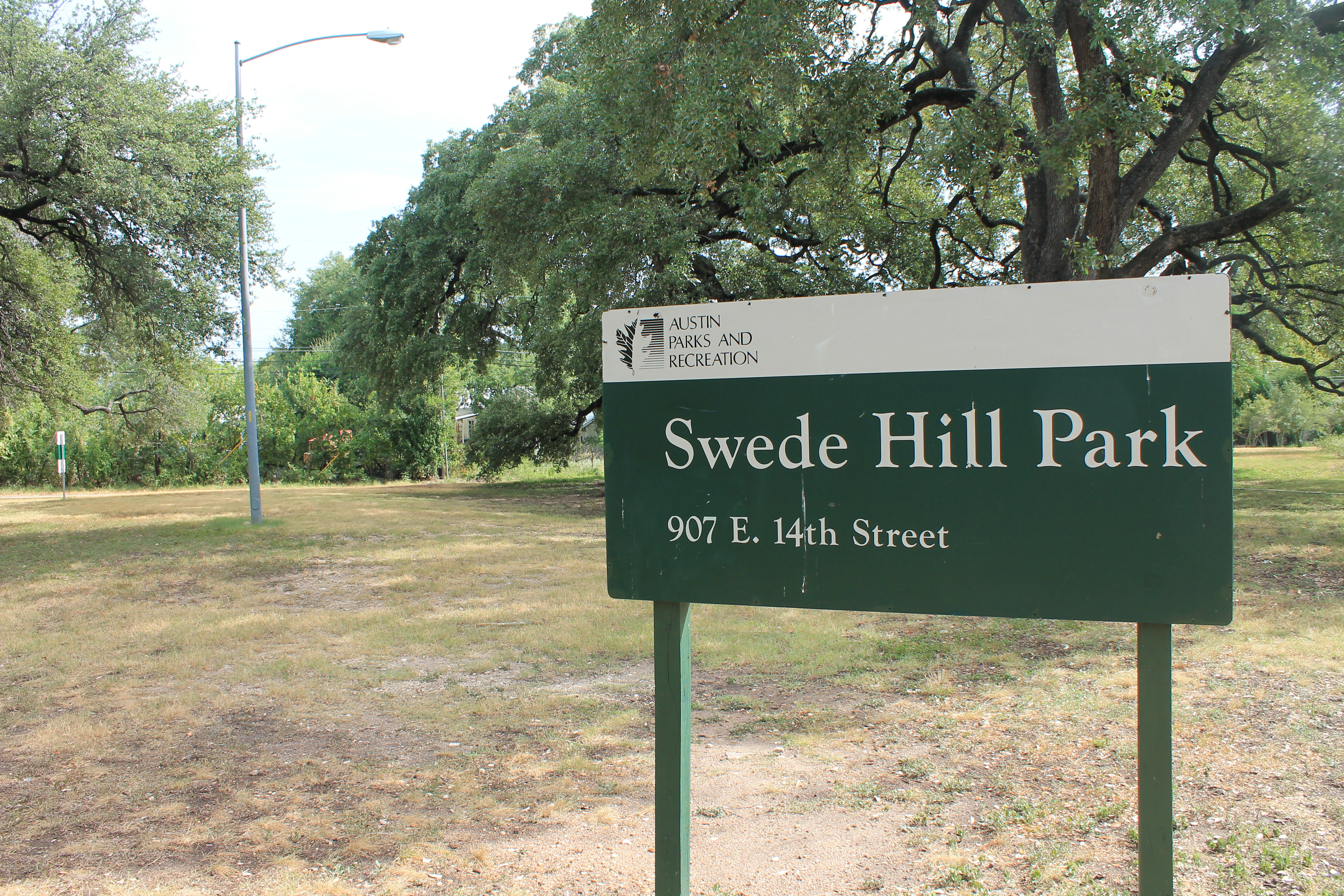

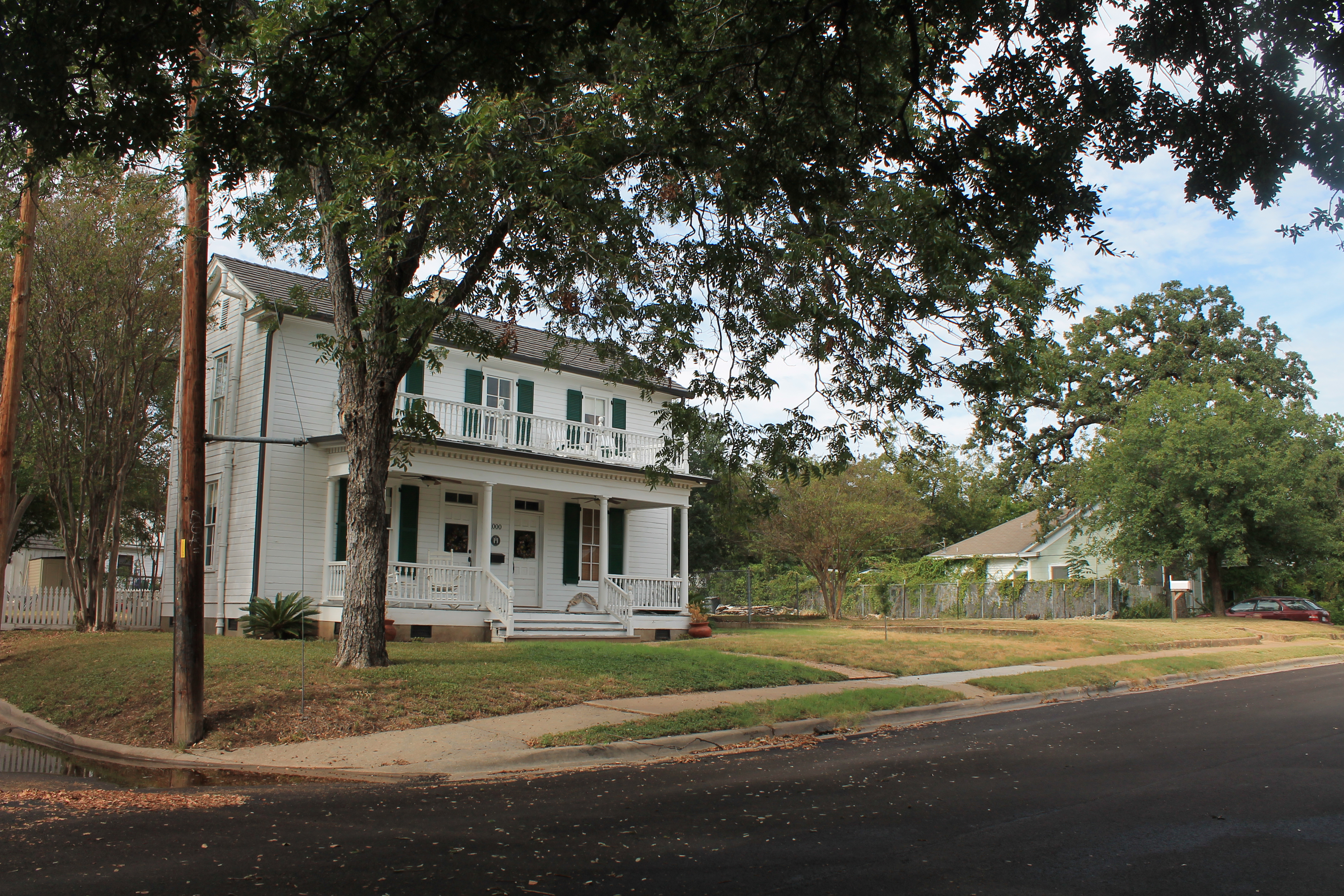

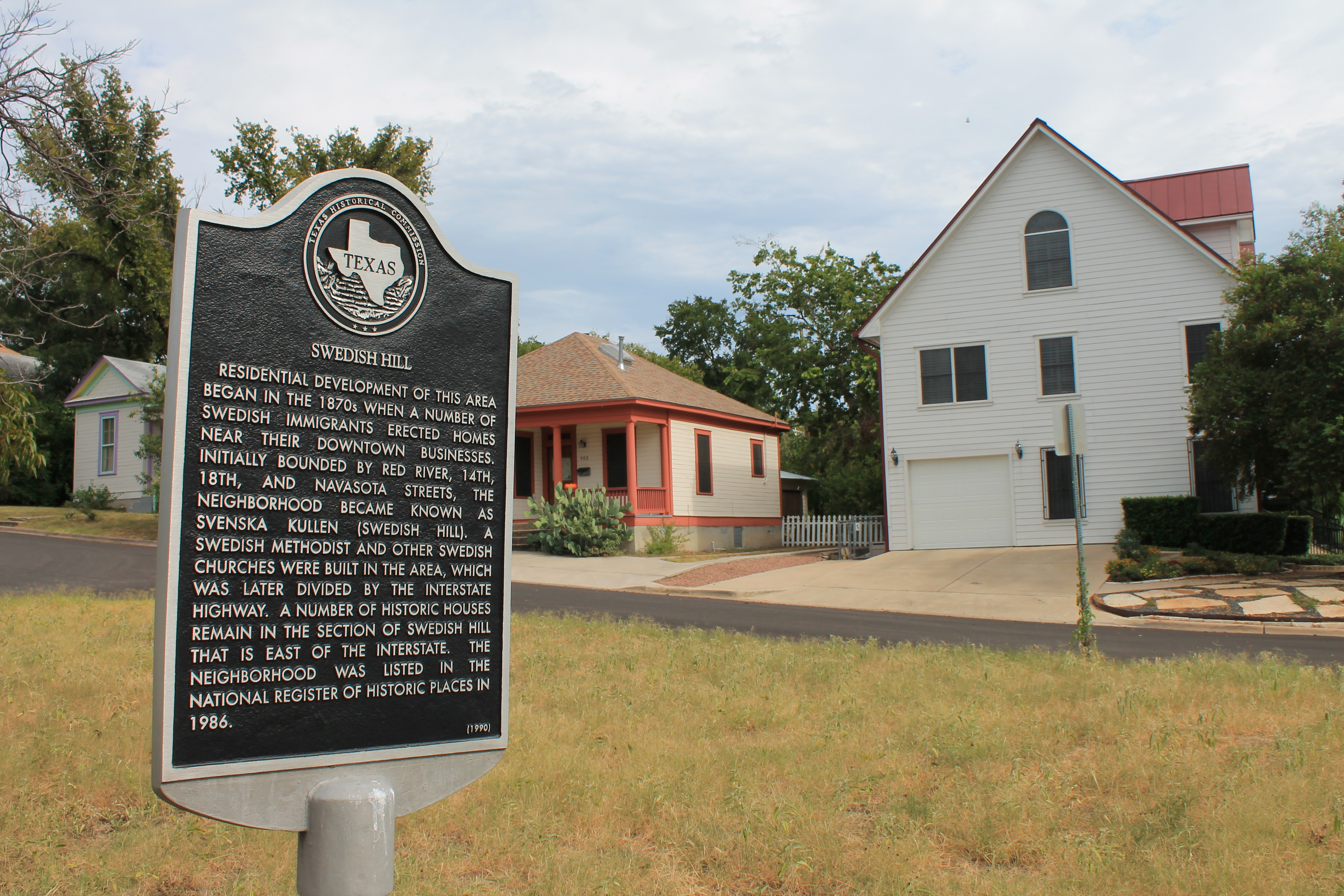

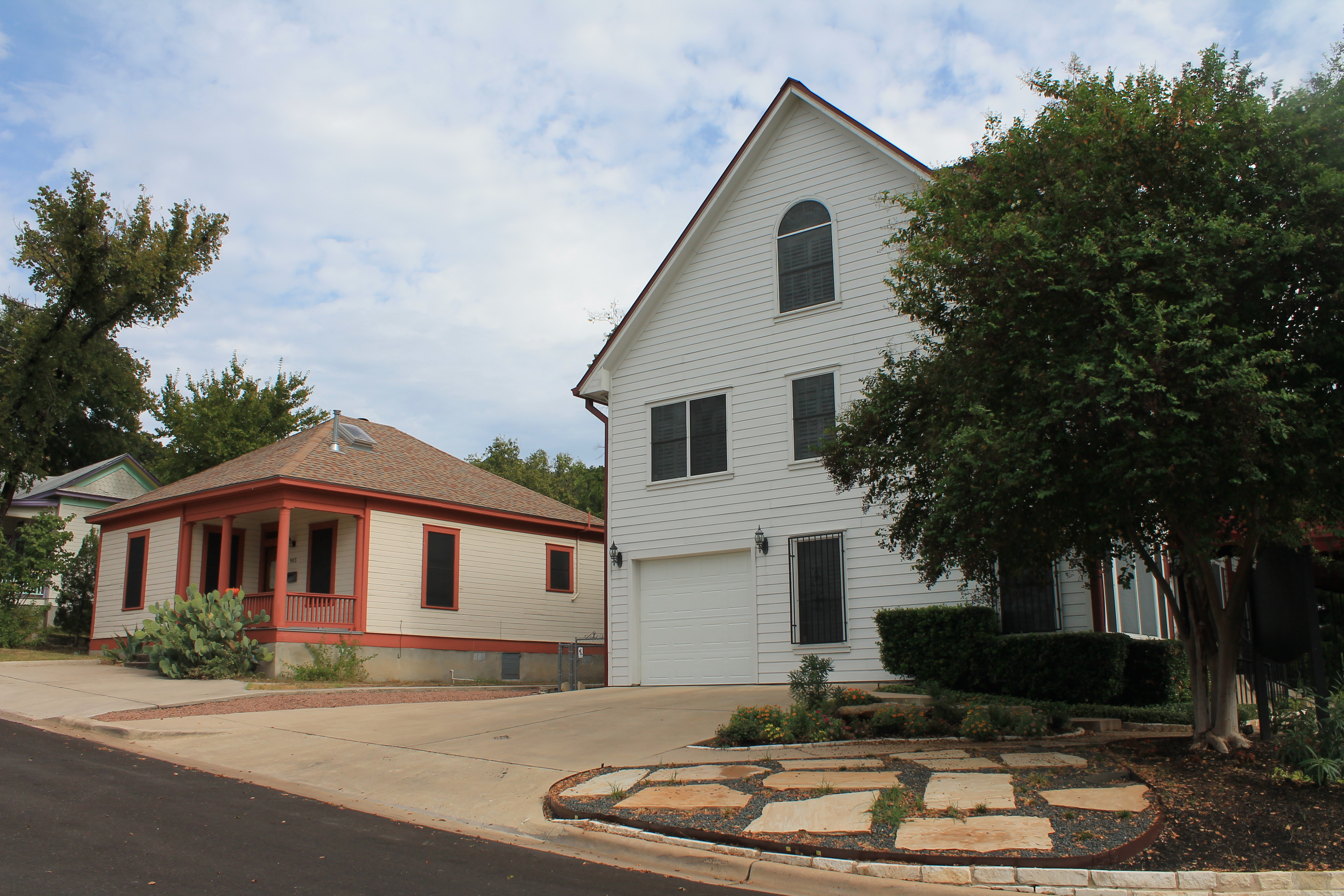

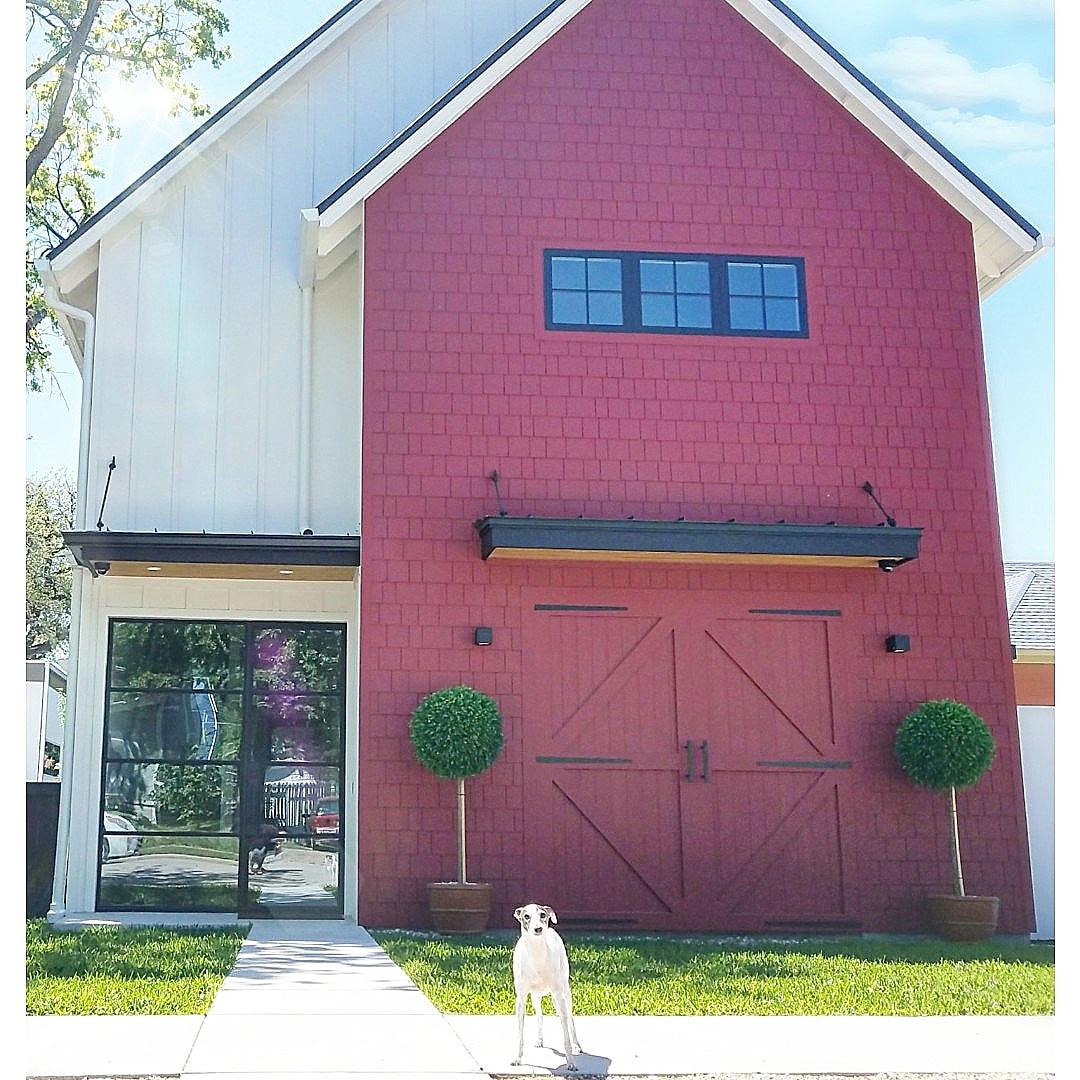

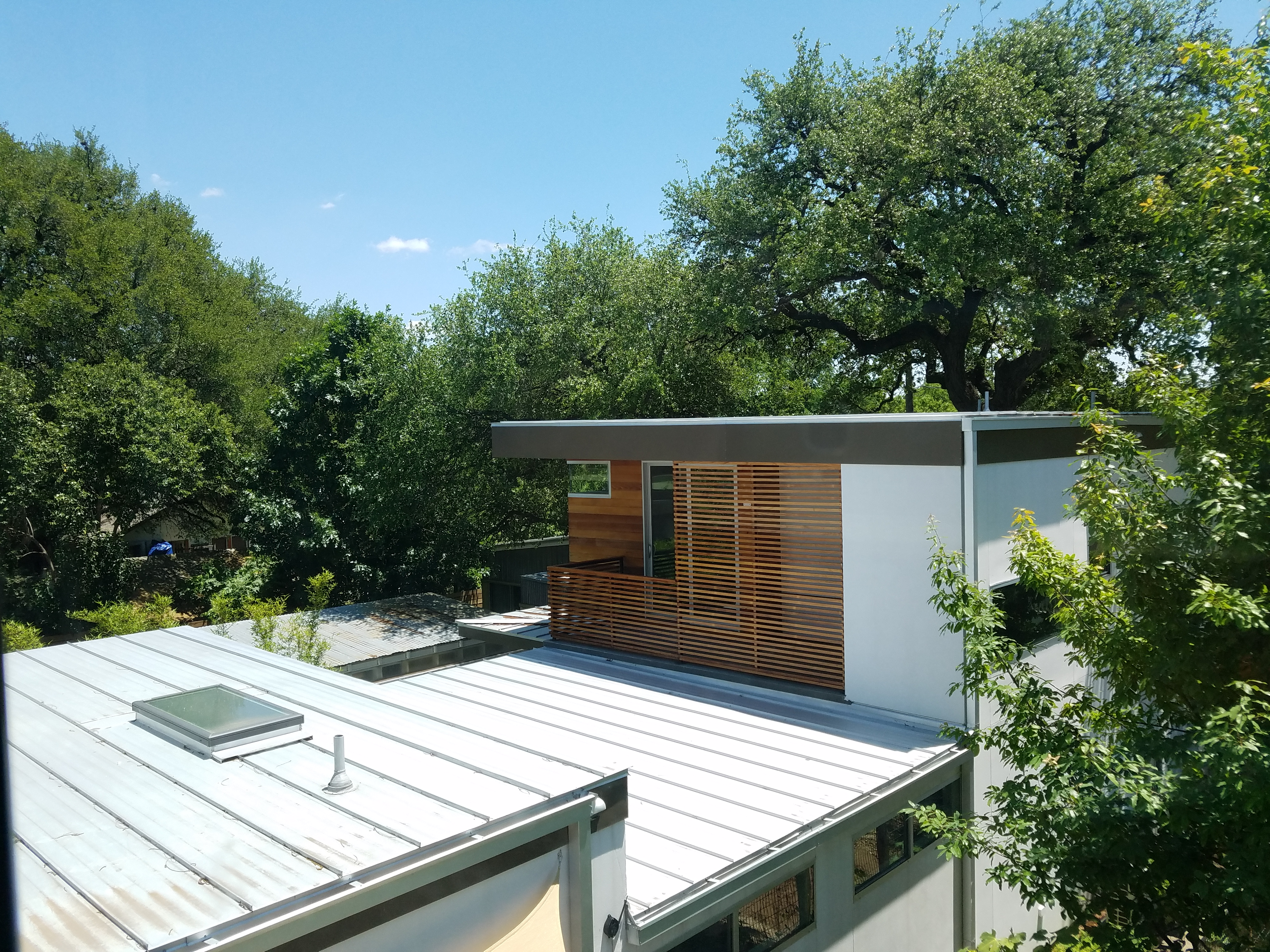

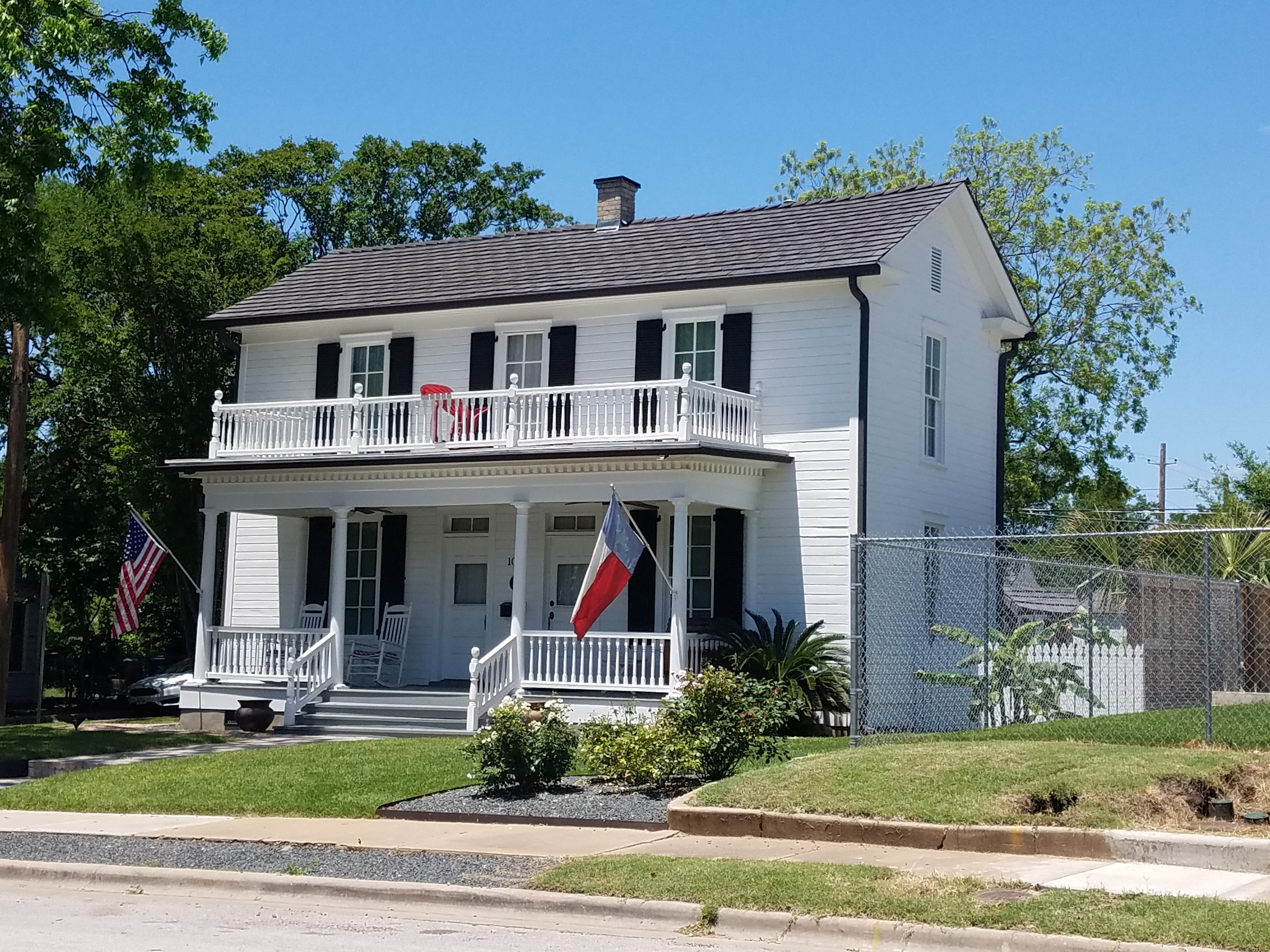

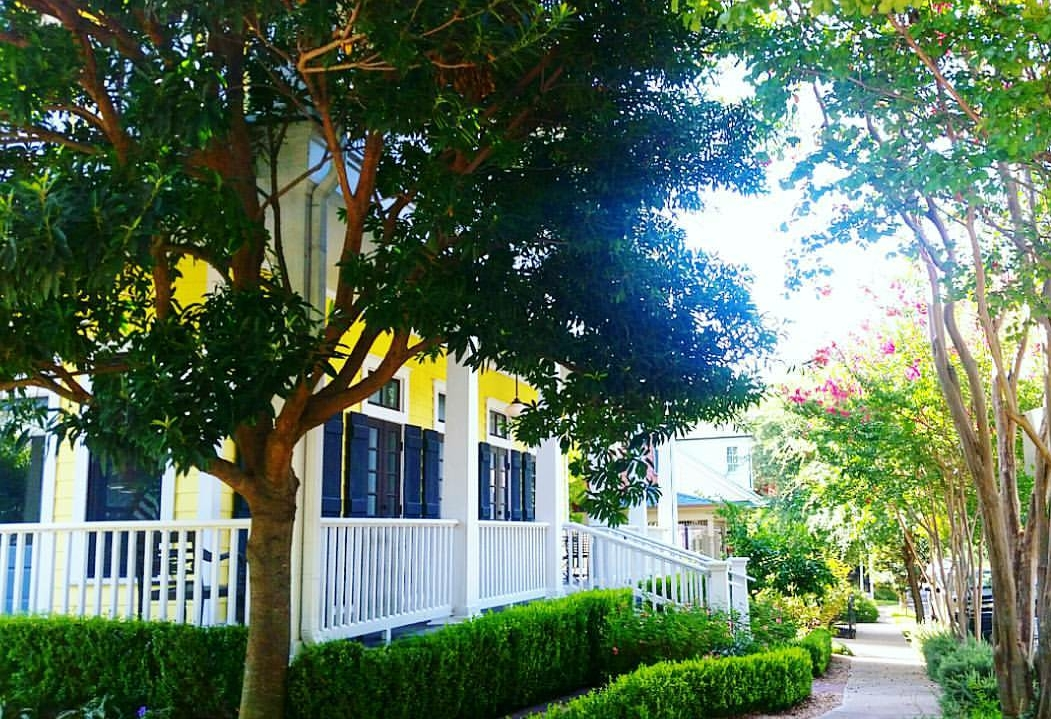

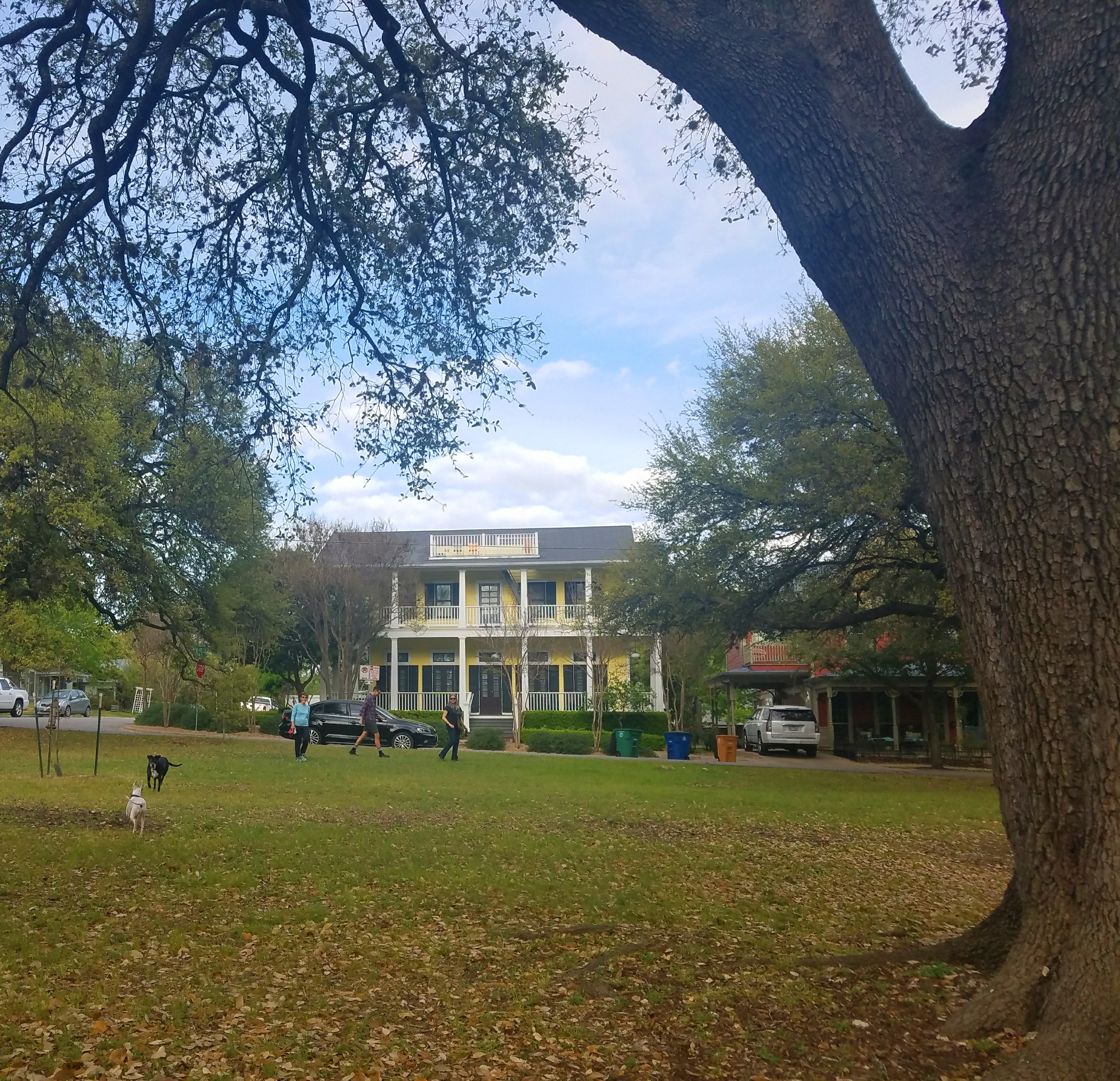

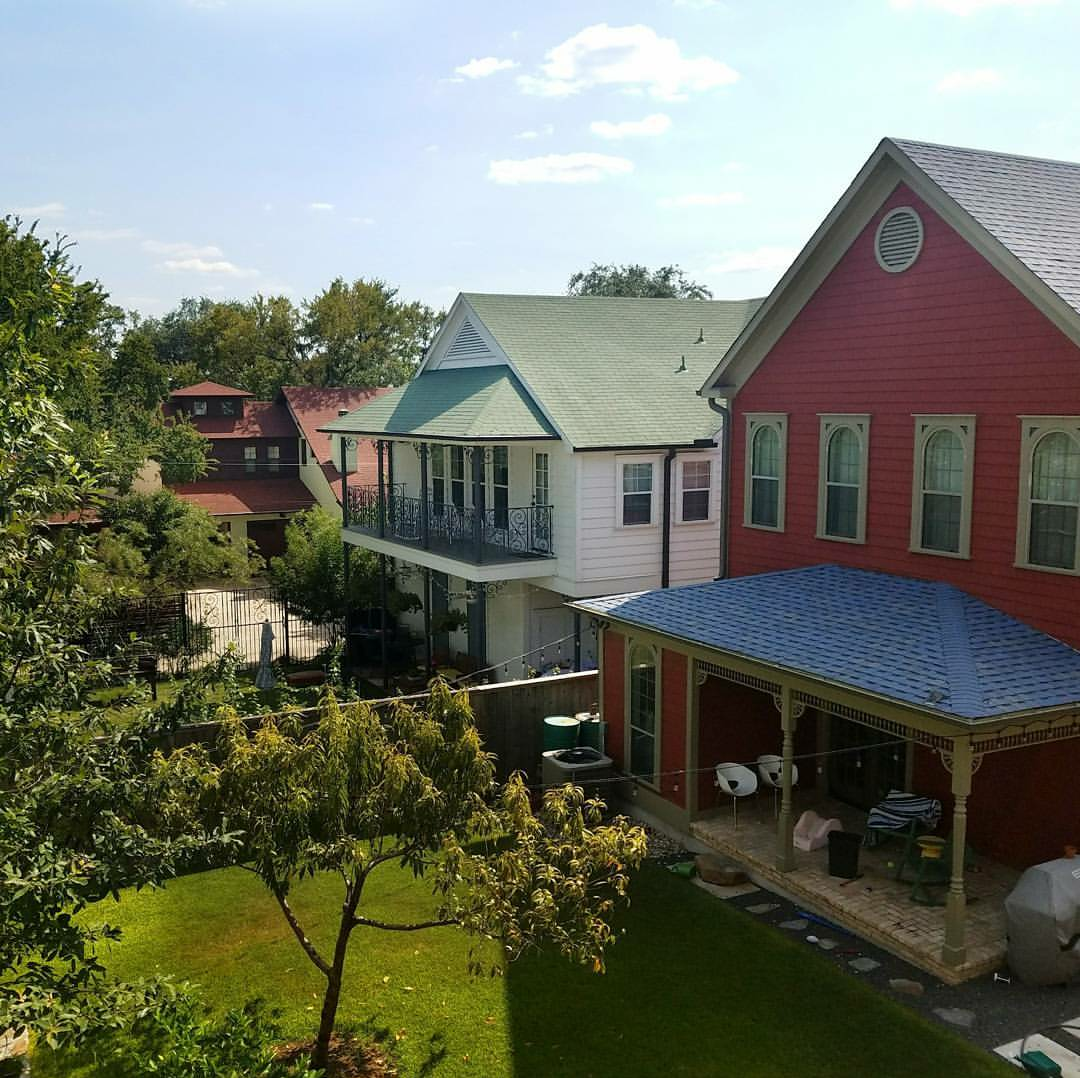
