= Genaro P. and Carolina Briones House =

Historic house in Texas, United States

- U.S. National Register of Historic Places
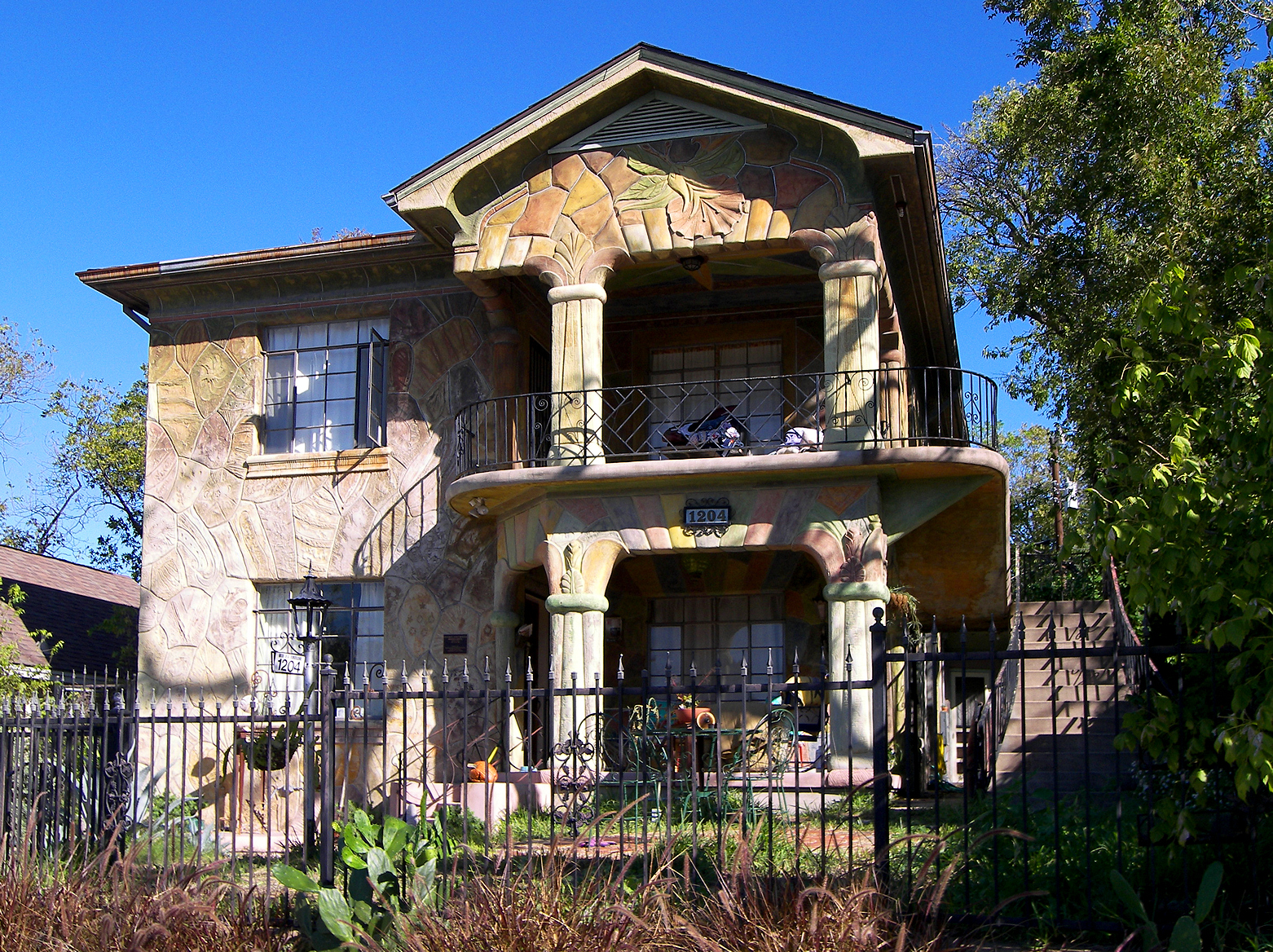

- Location within Texas Location within the United States
- Location: 1204 E. 7th St., Austin, Texas
- Coordinates: 30°15′56″N 97°43′47″W
- Built: 1947
- Architect: Genaro P. Briones
- Architectural style: Four square
- MPS: East Austin MRA
- NRHP reference No.: 98000280
- Added to NRHP: August 7, 1998

The Genaro P. and Carolina Briones House is a historic home in downtown Austin, Texas, United States. Built by Genaro Briones over a period of 14 years, the home features unusual molded concrete construction and a dramatic two-story porch. It is known by some in the Hispanic community as "Casa de Sueños" (House of Dreams).

The home is located at 1204 E 7th Street, in a strongly Hispanic portion of east Austin. It was added to the National Register of Historic Places on August 7, 1998.
