= TxTag =

Electronic toll collection system in Texas, United States

TxTag logo

TxTag /ˈtɛkstæɡ/, operated by the Texas Department of Transportation (TxDOT), was one of three interoperable electronic toll collection systems in Texas. The system was also interoperable with the K-TAG system used in Kansas and the Pikepass system used in Oklahoma.

On Nov 9, 2024, it was announced that the Harris County Toll Road Authority (the operators of EZ TAG) would be taking over TxTag.

== Current system status ==
The TxTag brand name is used on the following highways:

- Operated by TxDOT:
  - TX 130 in San Antonio.
  - SH 45 in Austin.
  - SH Loop 1 aka Mopac Expressway in Austin.
  - SH 99 a.k.a.. Grand Parkway the third loop around Houston (partial).
- Operated by the Cameron County Regional Mobility Authority
  - SH 550 aka Interstate 169 in the lower Rio Grande Valley area.
- Operated by the Central Texas Regional Mobility Authority:
  - 183A, a toll bypass of US 183 through Leander. CTRMA is planning several other toll road projects throughout the Austin metropolitan area, which are planned to accept TxTag.

== Interoperability ==
In 2003, all Greater Houston area toll-roads operated by Harris County Toll Road Authority and Fort Bend County Toll Road Authority (EZ TAG), and all Dallas–Fort Worth metroplex area toll-roads operated by North Texas Tollway Authority (TollTag) became compatible with TxTag, with the exception of Dallas/Fort Worth International Airport and Dallas Love Field airport parking, where NTTA's TollTag is the only ETC system recognized.

On May 17, 2017, the Kansas Turnpike Authority made TxTag compatible with the K-TAG system used on the Kansas Turnpike.

On May 7, 2019, the Oklahoma Turnpike Authority made TxTag compatible with the PikePass system used on all of Oklahoma's turnpikes.

On June 2, 2024, Colorado made TxTag compatible with the ExpressToll system used on CDOT's express lanes and the E-470 toll road, but not on the Northwest Parkway.

NationalPass provides interoperability with systems outside Texas.

TxTag transponders are currently not accepted at tolled border crossings with Mexico, although future interoperability is planned with the Laredo Trade Tag accepted at four crossings. TxTag is not compatible with transponders from the E-ZPass system, although the two systems have been in talks with each other.

== Technology ==
TxTag uses at least two types of transponders manufactured by TransCore: legacy hard case AT5100 transponders and newer eGo Plus flexible sticker-type transponders. The transponders are mounted on the inside of the vehicle at the top center of the windshield. The TxTag sticker can be used as a portable device, provided it is affixed to a small square of glass instead of a windshield. According to the patent for the device, the sticker was specifically designed such that if removed, among other things capacitor 66 is decoupled from 64, preventing the use of the sticker if it is torn from the glass. It would also appear the sticker can be simply taped to the inside of the windshield for temporary use.

== See also ==
- E-ZPass used in 14 states, mostly in the East, as well as in Ontario
- EZ TAG
- Fastrak used in California
- GeauxPass used in Louisiana
- I-Pass used in Illinois
- K-Tag used in Kansas
- NationalPass provides interoperability with TransCore systems outside of Texas
- Peach Pass used in Georgia
- Pikepass used in Oklahoma
- Sunpass used in Florida
- TollTag
- Texas tollways
