= Farm to Market Road 1325 =

Road in Texas, United States

Farm to Market Road 1325

Route information
- Maintained by TxDOT
- Length: 7.185 mi (11.563 km)
- Existed: 1949–present

Major junctions
- South end: US 183 in Austin
- Loop 1 (Mopac Expressway)
- North end: SH 45 Toll in Round Rock

Location
- Country: United States
- State: Texas

Highway system
- Highways in Texas; Interstate; US; State; Former; Toll; Loops; Spurs; FM/RM; Park; Rec
← FM 1324	→ FM 1326

Farm to Market Road 1325 (FM 1325) is a 7.2-mile (11.6 km) roadway located in Travis and Williamson counties of Texas. Along much of its length it is referred to as Burnet Road.

== History ==
The name Burnet Road derives from the fact that the road once formed part of a highway between Austin and Burnet.

FM 1325 was designated on July 14, 1949 from US 81 (now I-35) to SH 29 (now US 183). The segment between I-35 and proposed SH 45 was redesignated as part of State Highway 45 on August 25, 2003.

== Route description ==
FM 1325 has three main segments. The first begins at an intersection with US 183 in north Austin. Here, FM 1325 is named Burnet Road (pronounced burn-it) and is a four-lane controlled roadway. It proceeds north 2.5 miles (4.0 km) to an intersection with Loop 1 (Mopac Expressway).

At this point, FM 1325 joins Loop 1 and continues north for 1.5 miles (2.4 km) as a limited-access highway. North of FM 734 (Parmer Lane), the main lanes of Mopac Expressway become a limited-access toll road. The frontage road here uses the FM 1325 and Loop 1 designations. This concurrency continues for 1.8 miles (2.9 km) to Merrilltown Road.

North of Merilltown Road, FM 1325 is once again named Burnet Road and is a four-lane controlled roadway. It continues north for 2.1 miles (3.4 km) to its northern terminus at SH 45 in Round Rock.

As of June 27, 1995, FM 1325 was officially designated Urban Road 1325 (UR 1325), but on November 15, 2018, the road was redesignated back to FM 1325.

== Junction list ==
County	Location	mi	km	Destinations	Notes
Travis	Austin			US 183 (Research Boulevard)	
Travis	Austin			Loop 1 south (Mopac Expressway) / Duval Road	South end of Loop 1 concurrency
Travis	Austin			FM 734 (Parmer Lane)	
Travis	Austin			Loop 1 Toll north (Mopac Expressway)	North end of Loop 1 concurrency
Williamson	Round Rock			SH 45 Toll to I-35	
1.000 mi = 1.609 km; 1.000 km = 0.621 mi
