= Texas State Highway 45 =

State highway in Texas

State Highway 45

Route information
- Length: 25.024 mi (40.272 km)
- Existed: 1985–present

Eastern segment
- Counterclockwise end: US 183 / 183A Toll Road / RM 620 in Austin
- Major intersections: Loop 1 Toll near Round Rock; I-35 in Round Rock; SH 130 Toll in Pflugerville; US 290 / 290 Toll Road in Austin; SH 71 near Austin; SH 130 Toll / US 183 in Mustang Ridge
- Clockwise end: I-35 in Austin

Southwestern segment
- Counterclockwise end: FM 1626 in Austin
- Major intersections: Loop 1 in Austin
- Clockwise end: RM 1826 in Austin

Location
- Country: United States
- State: Texas
- Counties: Hays, Travis, Williamson

Highway system
- Highways in Texas; Interstate; US; State; Former; Toll; Loops; Spurs; FM/RM; Park; Rec
← I-45	→ SH 46

State Highway 45 is a freeway loop around Austin, Texas, that exists in two open segments. The official designation of SH 45 is such to form a complete loop around Austin, a distance of roughly 80 miles (130 km).

One segment is in southwest Austin and runs southeast from Ranch to Market Road 1826 to Farm to Market Road 1626 and intersects the southern terminus of Loop 1 (Mopac Expressway). Between RM 1826 and Loop 1, the roadway is a divided four-lane facility with a wide median intended to accommodate a future freeway, after which the current lanes would serve as frontage roads. Between Loop 1 and FM 1626, the roadway becomes a tolled freeway.

The other segment is a toll road that forms a backwards C-shape along the boundary of Travis and Williamson County before bending down along the eastern edge of the Austin metropolitan area where it shares its route with SH-130.

== Route description ==
Before the 2002 Central Texas Turnpike Project (CTTP), SH 45 existed only as a short section of four-lane, divided highway in southwest Austin. The CTTP added a toll road that runs east from US 183 near Cedar Park, crosses I-35, bi-secting the La Frontera development, and meets SH 130 near Pflugerville. South of this interchange, SH 45 is co-signed with SH 130 to US 183 just south of Austin-Bergstrom International Airport. SH 45 then loops westward rejoining I-35 north of Buda.

=== SH 45 North ===
SH 45 North is an approximately 13-mile (21 km) segment in the north Austin metropolitan area. The freeway's western terminus is at US 183 northwest of Austin in Cedar Park. For a distance, RM 620 travels concurrently with the frontage roads also designated as State Highway 45 (non-tolled). Heading east, the freeway intercepts Loop 1's northern terminus, bisects La Frontera and crosses I-35. This particular segment ends at SH 130 near Pflugerville, but the SH 45 designation continues southward along SH 130.

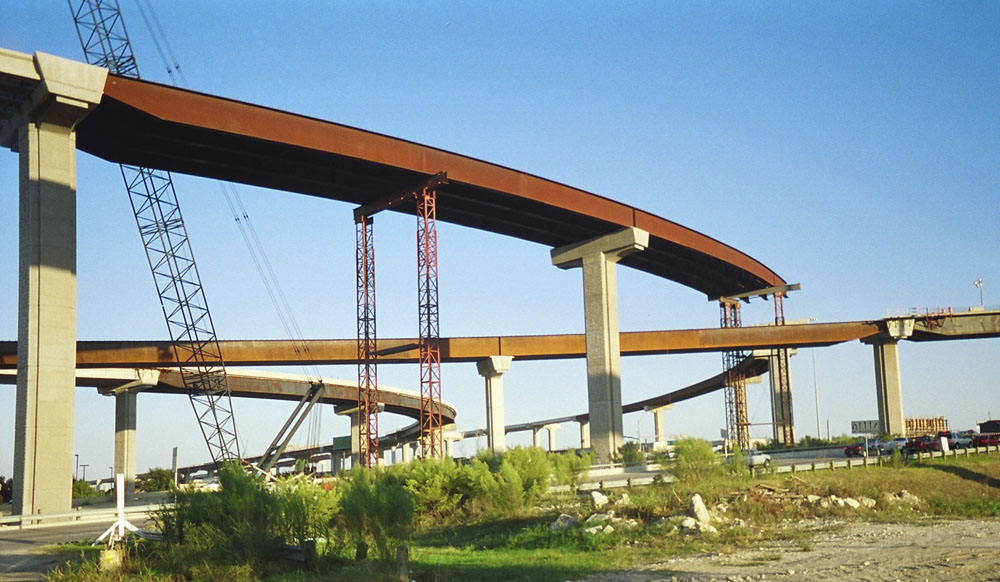
State Highway 45 interchange with Interstate 35 under construction.

The Texas Department of Transportation had originally planned to complete construction of the entire 2002 CTTP in September 2007 but opened some sections of SH 45 North as early as October 31, 2006.

=== SH 45 Southeast ===
SH 45 Southeast is a 7.4-mile (11.9 km), tolled segment southeast of Austin, near Creedmoor, Texas. Roughly paralleling Farm to Market Road 1327, it is a four-lane, controlled-access facility that links SH 130 and US 183 to Interstate 35 north of Buda, Texas. It completes the SH 45 eastern bypass loop around the Austin metropolitan area.

Originally planned as part of the 2002 CTTP, SH 45 Southeast became the subject of controversy, delaying development and necessitating it as a separate project. In 2006, an environmental advocacy group filed a lawsuit in an effort to move the alignment further south. By the summer of the same year, the Federal Highway Administration approved a new environmental impact study affirming the existing alignment, and a federal judge dismissed the case, clearing the way for construction, which began in Summer 2007. SH 45 Southeast was opened to traffic on May 7, 2009.

=== SH 45 Southwest ===
SH 45 Southwest is a 3.6-mile (5.8 km) tollway link between the southern terminus of Loop 1 in the west and Farm to Market Road 1626 to the east. It is a four-lane, controlled-access facility and has a toll rate of $1. Construction on the SH 45 Southwest link officially began in November 2016, after decades of delays due to environmental and legislative concerns. SH 45 Southwest was opened to traffic on June 1, 2019. On April 25, 2022, the highway was assigned a speed limit 70 miles per hour. From the opening of the highway until that date, the highway had no signed speed limit. The unsigned speed limit was set at the state default of 65 miles per hour, as the CTRMA conducted studies to find the 85th percentile operating speed.

The highway will still require a segment between FM 1626 and I-35 to connect to the other tolled segments of SH 45. This section, SH 45 South, is already included in the Capital Area Metropolitan Planning Organization (CAMPO) 2040 Plan for study. This missing link was one source of controversy surrounding the alignment of SH 45 Southeast. Opponents claimed the proximity of the southwestern and southeastern sections would create more pressure to connect the two and that, if built, the link would encourage development on or near environmentally sensitive land. Planning for the western portions of SH 45 to form a complete loop is still very early, although a proposal for possible route has already been offered by the City of Lakeway.

== History ==

State Highway 45 was originally designated on August 18, 1919, as a route from Bryan to the Louisiana border. On September 17, 1923, the section west of Roans Prairie was cancelled. On August 11, 1925, SH 45 was rerouted through Point Blank, Coldspring and Shepherd. On March 19, 1929, a branch of SH 45 on a more direct route from Point Blank to Livingston was designated. As of March 19, 1930, large portions of the highway were still under construction along the proposed route. The section of the branch from Point Blank to Coldspring was renumbered as SH 156 and the section of the branch from Coldspring to Shepherd was renumbered as part of SH 150, so that SH 45 went on the most direct route between Point Blank and Livingston. By 1938, the road was complete, with small portions remaining as a dirt road. On September 26, 1939, the highway from Huntsville to Jasper had been transferred to U.S. Highway 190, the stretch from Jasper to the Louisiana state line transferred to SH 63 (this was originally proposed as SH 296, and the section from Roans Prairie to Huntsville redirected north to Crockett. on August 24, 1960, the stretch from Huntsville to Crockett was transferred to SH 19. On December 15, 1960, the rest of SH 45 was canceled and transferred to SH 30 to avoid confusion with I-45. The current route was designated, but not constructed, on May 22, 1985, as a proposed Austin Loop, along with SH 130 (north of US 183 only).

SH 45A was a spur designated on September 14, 1926, from Coldspring west to New Waverly. On March 19, 1930, this spur was renumbered as SH 150.

On February 11, 2021, icy conditions caused a 26 vehicle pile-up. This incident occurred near the overpass with RM 620. Three people were hospitalized.

The interchange at I-35 was partially affected by the March 21, 2022 tornado outbreak when a large light pole was ripped off its foundation, the debris resting on the side of a flyover, as seen from photos captured by KXAN-TV.

== Exit list ==
County	Location	mi	km	Destinations	Notes
Williamson	Austin	0.0	0.0	RM 620 (SH 45 west) / Pecan Park Boulevard	
Williamson	Austin	0.0	0.0	US 183 / 183A Toll Road north	Counterclockwise exit and clockwise entrance
Williamson	Austin	0.8	1.3	Lake Creek Parkway	Counterclockwise exit and clockwise entrance
Williamson	Austin			Lake Creek Toll Plaza	
Williamson	Austin	1.4	2.3	FM 734 (Parmer Lane)	
Williamson		2.8	4.5	RM 620	Full access to Pearson Ranch Road; access to Round Rock Medical Center
Williamson		4.8	7.7	O'Connor Drive / McNeil Road	Indirect clockwise exit and counterclockwise entrance for McNeil Road
Williamson		5.3	8.5	Loop 1 Toll south	
Williamson	Round Rock	6.4	10.3	FM 1325 (La Frontera Boulevard) / County Road 172	
Travis–Williamson county line	Round Rock	7.3	11.7	I-35 – Waco	I-35 exit 250B; no direct exits to I-35 south (signed eastbound at FM 1325 and westbound at A. W. Grimes Boulevard)
Williamson	Round Rock	8.0	12.9	Greenlawn Boulevard	No direct counterclockwise exit (signed at A. W. Grimes Boulevard)
Williamson	Round Rock	8.9	14.3	A. W. Grimes Boulevard	
Williamson	Round Rock	10.2	16.4	Kenney Fort Boulevard	No counterclockwise exit
Travis	Pflugerville	11.2	18.0	Heatherwilde Boulevard	Clockwise exit and counterclockwise entrance
Travis	Pflugerville			Pflugerville Toll Plaza	
Travis	Pflugerville	11.3	18.2	SH 130 / FM 685 / Kelly Lane	SH 130 exit 428A
Travis	Pflugerville	12.8	20.6	SH 130 Toll north – Waco	north end of SH 130 overlap; SH 45 north/west follows exit 428B
Travis	see SH 130				
Travis	Mustang Ridge	41.6	66.9	US 183 – Austin, Airport	SH 130 exit 457
Travis	Mustang Ridge	42.0	67.6	SH 130 Toll south – San Antonio	south end of SH 130 overlap; SH 45 south/west follows exit 458
Travis		45.6	73.4	FM 1625 – Creedmoor	
Travis				Buda Toll Plaza	
Travis		48.8	78.5	North Turnersville Road	
Travis	Austin	50.5	81.3	I-35 / FM 1327 east – San Antonio, Austin	I-35 exit 223A
Gap in route
Hays	Austin			FM 1626	Seagull intersection
Travis	Austin			Bliss Spillar Road	Counterclockwise exit and clockwise entrance
Travis	Austin			Bear Creek Toll Plaza	
Travis	Austin			Loop 1 north (Mopac Boulevard) / Archeleta Boulevard	Clockwise end of SH 45 Southwest Toll Road; counterclockwise end of divided highway
Travis	Austin			RM 1826	
1.000 mi = 1.609 km; 1.000 km = 0.621 mi: Concurrency terminus; Electronic toll collection; Incomplete access
