= Millett, Texas =

Unincorporated community in Texas, US

Coordinates: 28°34′55″N 99°11′57″W

Millett is an unincorporated community in La Salle County, Texas, United States. According to the Handbook of Texas, the community had an estimated population of 40 in 2000.

Millett is located at the junction of Interstate 35 and FM 469 in northern La Salle County, about 10 miles north of Cotulla. Public education in the community is provided by the Dilley Independent School District.

== History ==
Millett was established in 1881 as a depot on the International-Great Northern Railroad and was originally known as Cibolo Station before later being renamed Millett station.

In 1888, it received the postal designation of Millett in honor of Alonzo Millett (1842-1907), pioneer landowner and first postmaster. In 1896, the townsite was first surveyed, and abundant water was discovered in 1902. By 1910, Millett reported a census population of 500. In November 1913, a fire destroyed a large part of the business section of the town.

By 1941, the population had declined to 300, with a total of eight businesses. Plagued by the 1950s drought, Millett entered into a state of rapid decline. Its schoolhouse that had opened in 1898 closed in 1955, the post office closed in 1958, and the last business closed in 1960.
