= Texas State Highway Loop 275 =

State highway in Texas

State Highway Loop 275

Route information
- Maintained by TxDOT
- Length: 9.454 mi (15.215 km)
- Existed: 1939–present

Major junctions
- South end: I-35
- US 183
- North end: I-35

Location
- Country: United States
- State: Texas

Highway system
- Highways in Texas; Interstate; US; State; Former; Toll; Loops; Spurs; FM/RM; Park; Rec
← Loop 274	→ Spur 276

Loop 275 is a 9.454-mile (15.215 km), two-segment, state-maintained roadway located in Austin, Texas.

== History ==
Loop 275 was originally formed on March 24, 1954, when US 81 was realigned to form the Interregional Highway, which would later form the initial alignment for Interstate 35 (I-35). The route was also signed as US 81 Business. On February 25, 1975, Loop 275 was no longer planned to be US 81 Business.

At that time, Loop 275 followed Lamar Boulevard to what is now the Triangle neighborhood, where Guadalupe Street West splits from Lamar at the Y-intersection. From there, it followed Guadalupe Street and 1st Street (now Cesar Chavez Street) over to Congress Avenue, where it crossed the Colorado River at the Ann W. Richards Congress Avenue Bridge and then continued south to eventually rejoin I-35 in what is now the Southpark Meadows neighborhood.

Lamar Boulevard and Congress Avenue are main arterial roads through Austin, and on July 11, 1986, maintenance of the central segments of those roads (from US 183 to US 290) was returned to the city of Austin at its request. This resulted in the two-segment configuration of Loop 275 seen today. On February 24, 2000, the section of Loop 275 from US 290 to Williamson Creek was returned to the city of Austin at its request.

== Route description ==
As currently configured, Loop 275 consists of two non-connected segments. The 6.0-mile (9.7 km) northern segment starts at an interchange with US 183, just west of Interstate 35. It proceeds north along Lamar Boulevard, passing FM 734, before terminating at the southbound frontage road of Interstate 35, just south of Howard Lane (Exit 246).

The 3.2-mile (5.1 km) southern segment starts at an intersection with Slaughter Lane just west of Interstate 35 (Exit 227). It proceeds north along South Congress Avenue to its terminus at Williamson Creek south of US 290.

== Junction list ==
The entire route is in Austin, Travis County.

mi	km	Destinations	Notes
0.0	0.0	Slaughter Lane	
3.24	5.21	Bridge over Williamson Creek	
Gap in route
3.24	5.21	US 183 (Anderson Lane)	Interchange
8.23	13.24	FM 734 (Parmer Lane) to I-35	
9.45	15.21	I-35 south	Access via I-35 exit 246
1.000 mi = 1.609 km; 1.000 km = 0.621 mi
