= Marshall Ford, Texas =

Marshall Ford
- Unincorporated community
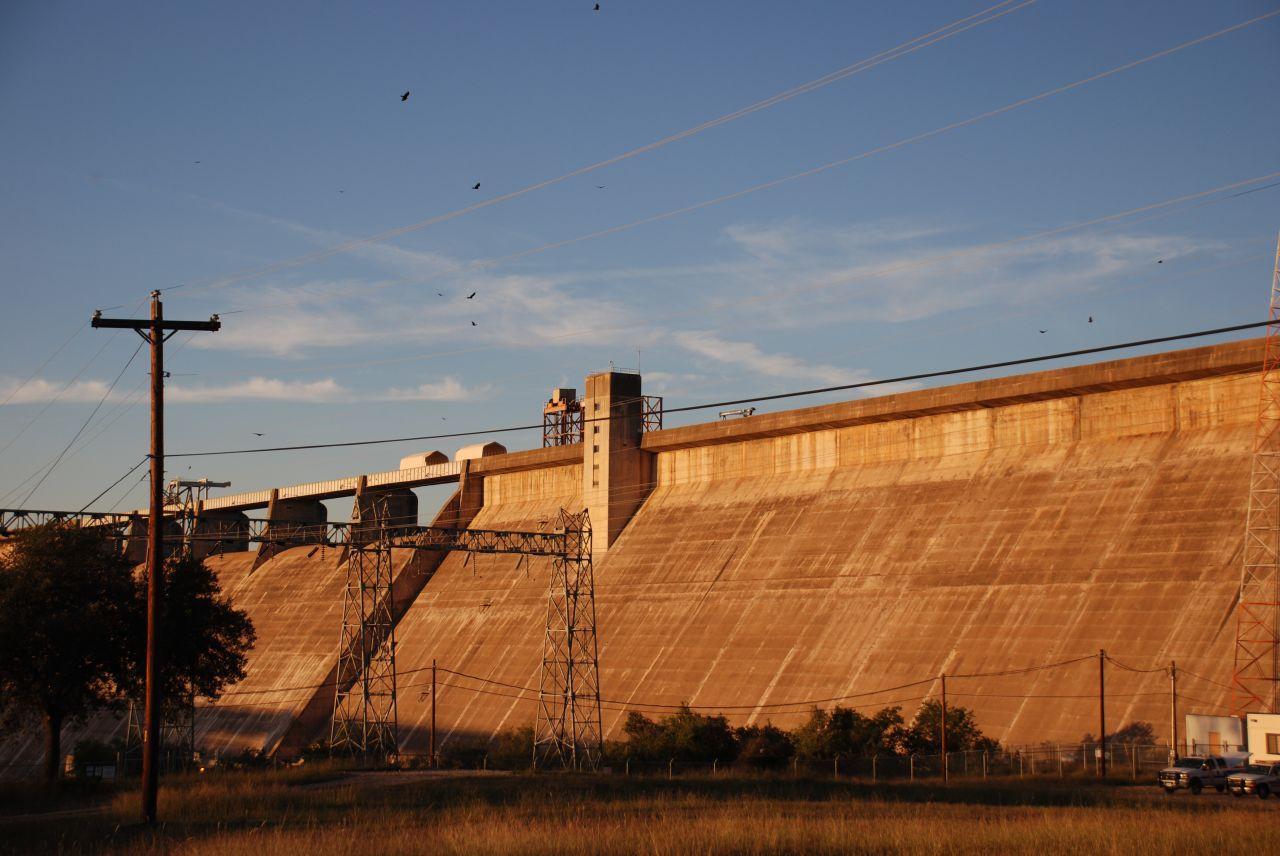
- Mansfield Dam in Marshall Ford

- Location within the state of Texas Marshall Ford (the United States)
- Coordinates: 30°23′31″N 97°53′19″W
- Country: United States
- State: Texas
- County: Travis
- Time zone: UTC-6 (Central (CST))
  - Summer (DST): UTC-5 (CDT)

Marshall Ford is a small unincorporated community in Travis County, Texas, United States. It is located within the Greater Austin metropolitan area.

== History ==
For many years, the agricultural and ranching regions in the western section of the county were connected to Austin by the original ford or low-water crossing of the Colorado River; the trading station and supply point in the bend of the river later became the market for cedar posts and timber. The Lower Colorado River Authority took control of the region in 1934, and Mansfield Dam, the main flood-control facility in a network of dams in the Colorado basin, was erected. Jack S. Beauchamp served as the first postmaster when a post office was established in Marshall Ford. In 1942, the office was shut down, and the locals' mail was forwarded to Austin.

== Geography ==
Marshall Ford is located on the coast of Lake Travis, 18 mi (29 km) northwest of Austin in Travis County.

== Education ==
Today, the community is served by the Leander Independent School District. Schools serving the community are Steiner Ranch Elementary School, Canyon Ridge Middle School, and Vandegrift High School.

== See also ==
- Ranch to Market Road 620
