= Texas State Highway 130 =

Pickle Parkway, highway in Texas

State Highway 130
- Pickle Parkway
- SH 130 highlighted in red

Route information
- Length: 130.6 mi (210.2 km)
- Existed: 1985–present

Major junctions
- South end: I-35 / I-410 in San Antonio
- I-10 / I-410 / US 90 in San Antonio; I-10 in Seguin; SH 142 in Lockhart; US 183 at various locations; SH 45 Toll from Mustang Ridge to Pflugerville; SH 71 near Austin; US 290 in Austin; US 79 near Hutto
- North end: I-35 in Georgetown

Location
- Country: United States
- State: Texas
- Counties: Bexar, Guadalupe, Caldwell, Travis, Williamson

Highway system
- Highways in Texas; Interstate; US; State; Former; Toll; Loops; Spurs; FM/RM; Park; Rec
← SH 129	→ SH 131

State Highway 130 (SH 130), also known as the Pickle Parkway, is a freeway and toll road in the U.S. state of Texas. It runs parallel to Interstate 35 (I-35) in San Antonio along I-410 and I-10 to east of Seguin, then north as a toll road from there to I-35 north of Georgetown. SH 130 runs in a 91-mile (146 km) corridor east and south of Austin. The route parallels I-35 and is intended to relieve the Interstate's traffic volume through the San Antonio–Austin corridor by serving as an alternate route.

The highway was developed in response to the tremendous surge in truck traffic on the I-35 corridor brought on by the North American Free Trade Agreement during the late 1990s, especially truck traffic originating from Laredo, where the Texas Department of Transportation (TxDOT) reported 150 trucks entering the United States every hour. A proponent of the highway's development, Capital Area Transportation Coalition, said that congestion along the I-35 corridor is costing businesses more than $194 million a year in higher operating costs and lost productivity.

The 41-mile (66 km) section of the toll road between SH 45 and I-10 has a posted speed limit of 85 mph (137 km/h), the highest posted speed limit in the Western Hemisphere.

== Route description ==
SH 130 begins while running concurrently with I-410 at an interchange with I-35 in southwestern San Antonio. SH 130 follows I-410 until an interchange with I-10/US 90 just east of Downtown San Antonio, and then follows those two highways to Seguin. SH 130 leaves I-10 in eastern Seguin, running north as a tollway. Near Lockhart, the tollway begins an overlap with US 183; US 183 runs along the frontage roads. In the small community of Mustang Ridge, US 183 leaves the frontage roads and an overlap with SH 45 begins.

The two highways run in a northeast direction passing through rural areas of Travis County. The tollway passes near Austin-Bergstrom International Airport at the interchange with SH 71 and runs in extreme east Austin. The tollway curves around Lake Walter E. Long after the interchange with the Manor Expressway near Manor. In the city of Pflugerville, there is slight development along the route near Farm to Market Road 685 (FM 685). SH 45 leaves the tollway in Pflugerville, and SH 130 runs through rural areas of Williamson County.

In southern Williamson County, SH 130 acts as an eastern bypass around Round Rock. It has an interchange with US 79 between Round Rock and Hutto. After entering the Georgetown city limits, it then has an intersection with SH 29 before crossing the San Gabriel River. It then has an interchange with FM 971 before meeting its northern terminus at I-35. At its northern terminus, it has access to Georgetown Executive Airport via Aviation Drive, and SH 195 via I-35.

=== Posted speed limits ===
The 41-mile (66 km) section of the toll road between SH 45 and I-10 has a posted speed limit of 85 mph (137 km/h), the highest posted speed limit in the Western Hemisphere.

As of October 2025, the only speed limits in the world greater than or equal to this are the 140 km/h (87 mph) limits of Poland and Bulgaria (among other countries), the Czech Republic's 150 km/h (93 mph) limit (on a single motorway route), Sheikh Khalifa Bin Zayed Al Nahyan Highway in Abu Dhabi with a speed limit of 160 km/h (99 mph), as well as Germany and the Isle of Man, which have roads without any posted maximum limit.

== History ==
=== Previous route ===
State Highway 130
- Location: El Paso to Pine Springs
- Existed: January 18, 1928–September 26, 1939

The SH 130 designation was previously used for a highway in far west Texas, between the city of El Paso and SH 54 in El Paso, Hudspeth, and Culberson counties. That route was designated on January 18, 1928. In 1932, the route was co-designated as a portion of US 62. On January 21, 1936, SH 130 was extended east to the New Mexico state line, replacing a portion of SH 54. The SH 130 designation was dropped as part of the general redescription of the state highway system on September 26, 1939. Since September 6, 1943, the previous route has also been designated as a portion of US 180 along with US 62.

=== Current route ===
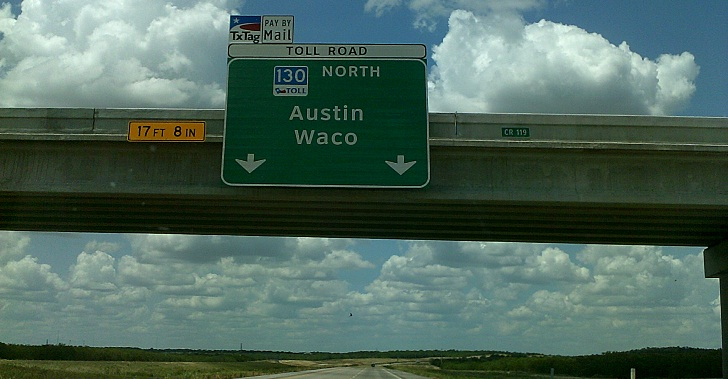
SH 130 northbound near Kingsbury, July 2013

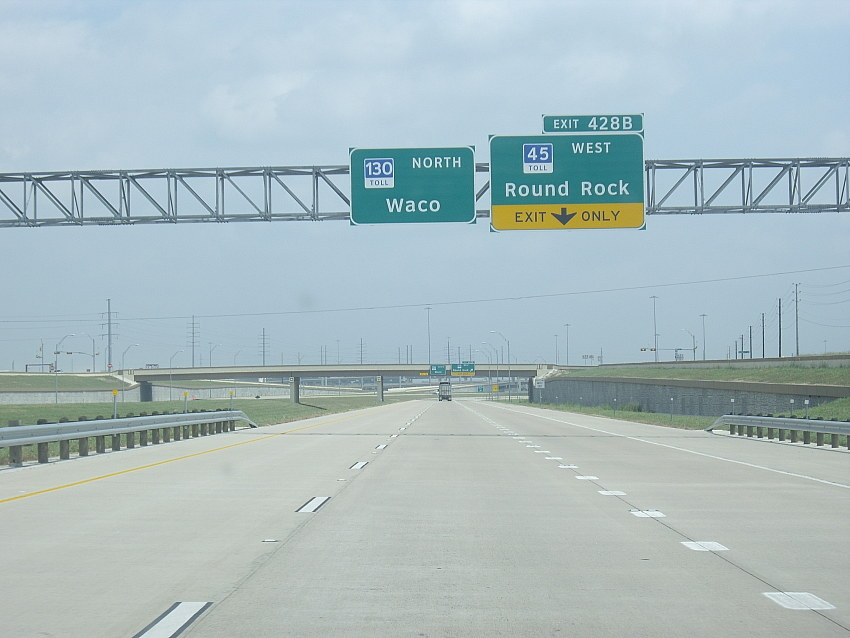
SH 130 northbound in Pflugerville, May 2008

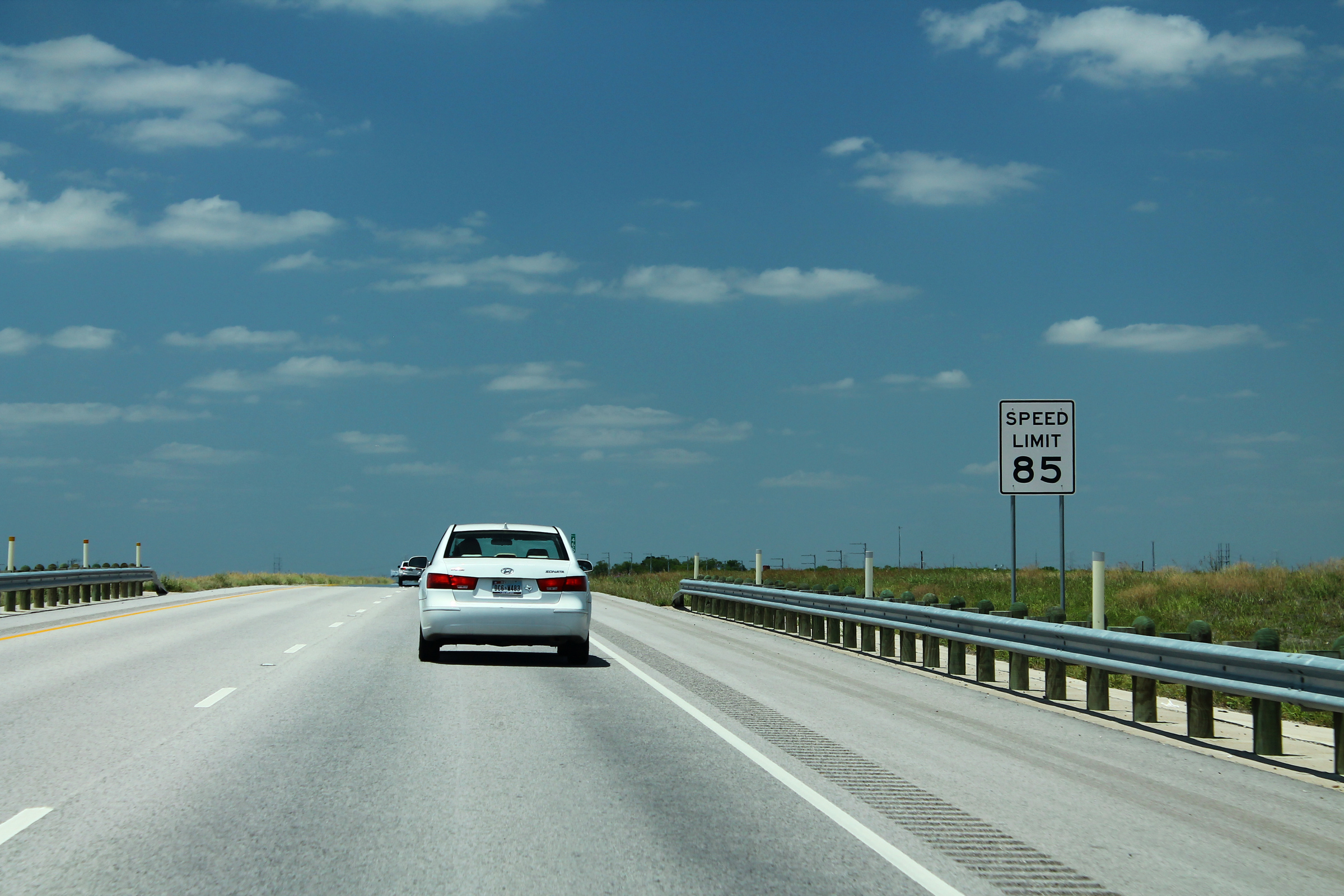
85 mph speed limit sign in 2014

SH 130 was designated on May 22, 1985, along with SH 45, as a route from I-35 to US 183 south of Austin. On January 30, 1989, SH 297 was designated from US 183 in Mendoza to I-10 in Seguin. On December 8, 1993, SH 297 became part of SH 130. On October 27, 1994, the SH 130 sections were connected with part of the SH 130 tollway along US 183 added to the plans.

In June 2002, Lone Star Infrastructure, a consortium of major highway construction contractors and civil engineering firms, was awarded a Comprehensive Development Agreement by TxDOT to design and build the section from I-35 in Georgetown to US 183 southeast of Austin. The cost of this section was expected to be $1.5 billion, which included the costs of utility relocation, design, construction, and right-of-way. Right-of-way costs alone were estimated at $389 million.

Groundbreaking for SH 130 took place on October 3, 2003. The first segment to open to the public was from US 290 northbound to US 79 on November 1, 2006. On December 13, the highway was extended northward to a junction with I-35. On September 6, 2007, the route was extended southward from US 290 to SH 71. Segment 4 opened on April 30, 2008, running 8.7 miles (14.0 km) from SH 71 to US 183.

On June 28, 2006, a partnership between Cintra and Zachry American Infrastructure, developers of the Trans-Texas Corridor, reached a $1.3 billion agreement with the state to build segments 5 and 6 from US 183 southeast of Austin to I-10 in Seguin. Cintra-Zachry formed SH 130 Concession Company to manage the project. In exchange for the investment, the company received the right to collect tolls for 50 years in a revenue-sharing agreement with the state. The state owns the road while the company is responsible for financing, design, construction, operation, and maintenance over the life of the agreement. Although substantially a private sector project, some costs for segments 5 and 6 were borne by TxDOT, including about 400 highway signs promoting SH 130 as an alternate route and a subsidized toll rate for truckers to use the highway instead of I-35. In 2013, Moody's downgraded the company's debt to junk status due to low traffic revenues, raising the possibility that TxDOT might terminate its toll contract with the group. The company explored debt restructuring around December 2013, and was in danger of a payment default in June 2014, eventually filing for bankruptcy in March 2016. The Concession Company eventually exited bankruptcy in 2017 with a new owner in the form of investment firm Strategic Value Partners, who bought out Cintra's stake in the joint venture.

The 2007 session of the Texas Legislature passed HB 2296, designating SH 130 in Williamson, Travis, Caldwell, and Guadalupe counties as the "Pickle Parkway" in honor of former United States Congressman J.J. "Jake" Pickle. Construction began in early 2009 on the final sections of SH 130, from Lockhart through Caldwell and Guadalupe counties to I-10, which opened on October 24, 2012. On the first evening the roadway was open, three cars crashed into packs of wild hogs. US 183 runs parallel to SH 130 from southeast of Austin to Lockhart.

TxDOT announced on September 29, 2011, that the SH 130 designation had been extended westward, along I-10 to I-410, then southward and westward along I-410 to I-35 in southern San Antonio. On March 2, 2016, the SH 130 Concession Company, who operates the toll road between Seguin and Mustang Ridge, filed for Chapter 11 bankruptcy. The concession's CEO, Alfonso Orol, stated that the highway will continue to operate during the bankruptcy proceedings.

== Proposal for toll removal ==
In 2013, House Bill 3682 was filed by state Representative Paul Workman with the goal of removing the tolls on SH 130 and re-designating the highway as an Interstate. The cost was estimated at $3 billion. $1.5 billion would come from the state's rainy day fund, with an equal amount being funded from federal sources. This bill died after being referred to Appropriations.

== Exit list ==
County	Location	mi	km	Exit	Destinations	Notes
Bexar	San Antonio	0.0	0.0	53	I-35 / I-410 north / SH 16 north – San Antonio, Laredo	South end of I-410 / SH 16 overlap
Bexar	San Antonio	see I-410				
Bexar	San Antonio	19.2– 19.9	30.9– 32.0	529	I-10 west / I-410 north / US 90 west – San Antonio	North end of I-410 overlap; south end of I-10 / US 90 overlap; SH 130 north follows exit 33; SH 130 south follows exit 581
see I-10
Guadalupe	Seguin	52.4	84.3	497	I-10 east – Houston	North end of I-10 overlap; SH 130 north follows exit 614
Guadalupe	Seguin	53.7	86.4	496	US 90 – Seguin	Southbound exit and northbound entrance
Guadalupe		59.0	95.0	491	FM 20	
Guadalupe		65.6	105.6	484	FM 621	
Caldwell		68.1	109.6	482	SH 80 – San Marcos, Luling	
Caldwell	Lockhart	75.9	122.1	475	Maple Street	no direct southbound exit (signed at exit 474)
Caldwell	Lockhart	76.8– 78.9	123.6– 127.0	474; 471	SH 142 / FM 2001 / Boggy Creek Road	signed as exit 474 northbound and 471 southbound; no direct southbound exit to FM 2001 (signed at exit 466)
Caldwell	Lockhart	79.7	128.3	470	US 183 – Lockhart	no direct access from SH 130 south to US 183 north or US 183 south to SH 130 north
Caldwell		82.1– 83.9	132.1– 135.0	469; 466	FM 1185	signed as exit 469 northbound and 466 southbound
Caldwell		84.4	135.8	464	Schuelke Road	no direct northbound exit (signed at exit 469)
Caldwell	Mendoza	86.3	138.9	465	Briarpatch Road / Homannville Trail	no direct southbound exit (signed at exit 461)
Caldwell	Mustang Ridge	87.5– 89.5	140.8– 144.0	463; 461	SH 21 / Laws Road	signed as exit 463 northbound and 461 southbound
Travis	Mustang Ridge	89.7	144.4	460	Old Lockhart Road	no direct northbound exit (signed at exit 463)
Travis	Mustang Ridge	90.8– 93.9	146.1– 151.1	460; 457	US 183 north – Austin, Airport	signed as exit 460 northbound and 457 southbound
Travis	Mustang Ridge	91.1	146.6	458	SH 45 Toll west – Buda	south end of SH 45 overlap
Travis	Mustang Ridge	94.6	152.2	455	Moore Road	
Travis		96.3	155.0	453	FM 812 – Circuit of the Americas	
Travis	Austin	98.1	157.9	451	Elroy Road	
Travis	Austin	99.1	159.5	450	Pearce Lane	
Travis		101.3	163.0	449	SH 71 – Austin, Houston, Airport	
Travis		103.4	166.4	446	Tesla Road	
Travis		105.1	169.1	444	FM 969	
Travis		108.2	174.1	441	FM 973	
Travis		111.7	179.8	439	Blue Bluff Road	No northbound exit
Travis	Austin	112.6	181.2	437	US 290 / 290 Toll Road west (Manor Expressway) – Austin, Houston	
Travis		113.3	182.3	436	FM 734 (Parmer Lane)	
Travis		114.7	184.6	435	Howard Lane / Gregg Manor Road	Northbound exit and southbound entrance
Travis		117.1	188.5	432	Cameron Road	
Travis	Pflugerville	118.0	189.9	431	Pecan Street	
Travis	Pflugerville	120.5	193.9	429	Pflugerville Parkway	no direct southbound exit (signed at exit 428A)
Travis	Pflugerville	121.4	195.4	428A	FM 685 south / Kelly Lane	
Travis	Pflugerville	121.9	196.2	428B	SH 45 Toll west – Round Rock	North end of SH 45 overlap
Williamson		123.8– 126.1	199.2– 202.9	426; 425	FM 685 north / Gattis School Road	signed as exit 426 northbound and 425 southbound
Williamson		126.5	203.6	423	US 79 – Taylor, Round Rock, Hutto	
Williamson		128.9	207.4	421	Limmer Loop	Southbound exit and northbound entrance
Williamson		130.3	209.7	419	Chandler Road / University Boulevard	
Williamson	Georgetown	133.3	214.5	417	County Road 104	
Williamson	Georgetown	135.0	217.3	415	SH 29 – Georgetown	
Williamson	Georgetown	137.1	220.6	413	FM 971 – Granger	Northbound exit and southbound entrance
Williamson	Georgetown	138.3	222.6	411	I-35 south – Austin	Northbound exit and southbound entrance
Williamson	Georgetown	139.6– 140.0	224.7– 225.3	409	I-35 north / SH 195 north – Waco, Florence, Killeen	Northbound exit and southbound entrance; northern terminus; I-35 exit 265
1.000 mi = 1.609 km; 1.000 km = 0.621 mi: Concurrency terminus; Incomplete access
