= Central Texas Regional Mobility Authority =

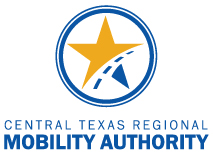

Authority overview
- Formed: 2002
- Type: Regional Mobility Authority
- Jurisdiction: Travis and Williamson Counties
- Headquarters: 3300 N. IH 35, Austin, Tx 78705
- Authority executives: Bobby Jenkins, Chairman; James Bass, Executive Director
- Website: www.mobilityauthority.com

The Central Texas Regional Mobility Authority (CTRMA, Mobility Authority) is an independent government agency created in 2002 to improve the transportation system in Travis and Williamson Counties in Texas. The Mobility Authority is headquartered at 3300 N. IH 35 in Austin.

== Governance ==
The Mobility Authority is overseen by a seven-member Board of Directors. The Governor appoints the Chairman, and the Travis and Williamson Counties Commissioners Courts each appoint three members to serve on the Board. Board members serve two-year terms and may be reappointed to subsequent terms. Board members are not compensated for their service. The Mobility Authority employs a professional staff of 32. The Mobility Authority uses private sector contractors with specialized expertise to provide staffing support for individual projects.

== Enabling Legislation ==
The Mobility Authority was created and operates under the Texas Transportation Code Chapter 370 and is authorized under state law to implement a wide range of transportation systems including roadways, airports, seaports and transit services. The Mobility Authority is authorized to issue revenue bonds to fund projects and relies on toll collections to repay its bonds. It can receive grants from other government agencies to help finance projects, but does not have its own taxing authority.

== Existing Toll Roads ==
183A Toll Road

The Mobility Authority's first project was 183A, an 11.6 mile (18.7 km) toll road in southwest Williamson County. Construction of the US $238 million toll road began in March 2005 and was opened to traffic in March 2007. The road serves the fast-growing suburban communities of Cedar Park, Leander and Liberty Hill. 183A features a state-of-the art electronic toll collection system and became the second toll road in the United States to convert to cashless all-electronic tolling on December 1, 2008.

In 2010, the Mobility Authority began a project to extend the tolled lanes of 183A 5-miles (8.0 km) from FM 1431/Whitestone Boulevard to near San Gabriel Parkway in Leander. The US $105 million 183A Northern Extension (Phase 2) project was opened to traffic in April 2012.

As of 2020, the Mobility Authority had completed an Environmental Assessment to extend the 183A an additional 6.6 miles (10.6 km) from just north of Hero Way to just north of SH 29 in Liberty Hill. The 183A Phase 3 project was estimated to cost US $260 million. Construction was projected to start in 2021 with completion slated for 2024. but

construction kept going into 2025

On April 9th, 2025 phase 3 of the 183A toll extension opened making the toll road now 16 mi (25.75 km)

290 Toll Road

The Mobility Authority's second project was the 290 toll road, constructed in phases starting in 2010. Phase 1 of the project involved construction of four direct connect flyover ramps at the interchange between US 183 and US 290. The flyovers opened to traffic in December 2012. Phase 2 involved constructing three tolled lanes and three non-tolled frontage road lanes in each direction on a 6.2 mile (10.0 km) stretch of US 290 from US 183 to Manor just east of FM 734/Parmer Lane. The US $426 million project opened to traffic in May 2014. The project was designed from the outset to be among the first all-electronic cashless toll roads in the United States with no traditional cash toll booths.

In 2019, the Mobility Authority began construction of three flyover ramps between SH 130 and the 290 toll road. The US $127 million project known as Phase 3, was developed in partnership with the Texas Department of Transportation, which funded the flyover ramp between the eastbound 290 toll road and southbound SH 130. The other two flyover ramps (southbound 130 to westbound 290 Toll and northbound SH 130 to westbound 290 Toll) were funded through the issuance of toll revenue bonds and are tolled. The Mobility Authority flyovers opened to traffic in phases between January and July 2020. The full project was completed in early 2021.

During development of the original 290 Toll Road Phase 2 project, there were proposals to extend the toll road through Manor past FM 973. However, community opposition stalled those efforts. As of 2019, a grassroots effort had begun to reconsider the project and the Mobility Authority authorized an initial feasibility study for a potential Phase 4 project.

MoPac Express Lanes

In October 2013, the Mobility Authority began construction off the US $204 million MoPac Improvement Project, an 11-mile (17.7 km) express lane project with Congestion pricing between Cesar Chavez Street in downtown Austin and FM 734/Parmer Lane in North Austin. The project involved expanding State Loop 1/MoPac Boulevard by adding one tolled lane in each direction along the median of the highway. The first section of northbound toll lane between RM 2222/Northland Boulevard and FM 734/Parmer Lane opened in October 2016. The remaining lanes, in both directions, were opened in phases in October 2017.

Other Roadways

Other Mobility Authority roadways open to traffic include the 4-mile 71 Toll Road adjacent to Austin-Bergstrom International Airport. and the 3.5-mile 45 Southwest Toll Road in south Austin. The Mobility Authority opened the 8-mile 183 South Toll Road in east Austin in phases between August 2019 and February 2021.

== Projects Under Development ==
183A Phase III

The 6.6-mile extension of 183A goes from near Hero Way in Leander to north of SH 29 in Liberty Hill. The project involves constructing two tolled lanes in each direction in the median of existing US 183 at a cost of $277 million. A shared-use path will be constructed for cyclists and pedestrians from Hero Way to the planned Seward Junction Loop. Construction began in 2021 and the extension is expected to open by 2025.

183 North Mobility Project

The 9-mile project between Loop 1 (MoPac) and SH45/RM620 involves constructing two express toll lanes in each direction in the median of US 183 and adding one non-tolled lane in each direction along the outside shoulder of the existing limited-access roadway. Construction began in 2021 and the project is expected to open to traffic by 2026. The total project cost is $612 million. The toll lanes are expected to have demand-based variable tolls similar to the MoPac Express Lanes.

MoPac South

The Mobility Authority has been working with stakeholders since 2013 to develop a plan to improve mobility on State Loop 1 (MoPac) between Cesar Chavez Street and Slaughter Lane. An Environmental Study is ongoing and the work to date has produced several concepts that include adding up to two express toll lanes in each direction with demand-based variable pricing similar to the existing MoPac Express Lanes.

== Authority Finances ==
According to the Mobility Authority's Fiscal Year 2020 Audited Financial Statements, the Authority collected toll revenue of US $116.9 million and had operating expenses (excluding depreciation and amortization) of US$37.9 million. The Authority had outstanding bonds and other debt of $1.8 billion and annual debt service payments of $65.8 million.

In 2012, the Capital Area Metropolitan Planning Organization agreed to provide a grant of $130 million in available state and federal funds to the Mobility Authority, which used the money to help fund the US$204 million MoPac Project. The Mobility Authority is making annual payments to a Regional Infrastructure Fund that will eventually total US$230 million over 25 years. The funds will be available to CAMPO for local transportation projects, effectively leveraging the available funds to develop future funding through the construction of a partially tolled roadway.

There has been some controversy in Texas over Public–private partnerships (P3), some of which have involved foreign toll road operators participating in the financing, construction, operation and maintenance of toll roads under long term concession agreements. To date, all of the Mobility Authority’s projects have been traditional government toll roads, financed by the Mobility Authority and completely under the control of the public, nonprofit governmental entity.
