= Ranch to Market Road 620 =

State highway in Travis and Williamson counties in Texas, United States

Ranch to Market Road 620

Route information
- Maintained by TxDOT
- Length: 23.329 mi (37.544 km)
- Existed: 1945–present
- History: 1945 as FM 620; 1956 as RM 620

Major junctions
- West end: SH 71 in Bee Cave
- SH 45 in Austin; US 183 in Austin
- East end: I-35 in Round Rock

Location
- Country: United States
- State: Texas
- Counties: Travis, Williamson

Highway system
- Highways in Texas; Interstate; US; State; Former; Toll; Loops; Spurs; FM/RM; Park; Rec
← FM 619	→ FM 621

Ranch to Market Road 620 (RM 620) is a ranch to market road in Travis and Williamson counties in Texas, United States, that is maintained by the Texas Department of Transportation (TxDOT). The 27.1-mile (43.6 km) road begins at SH 71 in Bee Cave in Travis County west of Austin passing along southeastern Lake Travis, western Austin, and several suburban communities west and north of Austin before ending at Bus. I-35-L in Round Rock in Williamson County. The road has major intersections with I-35, US 183, and SH 45.

== Route description ==
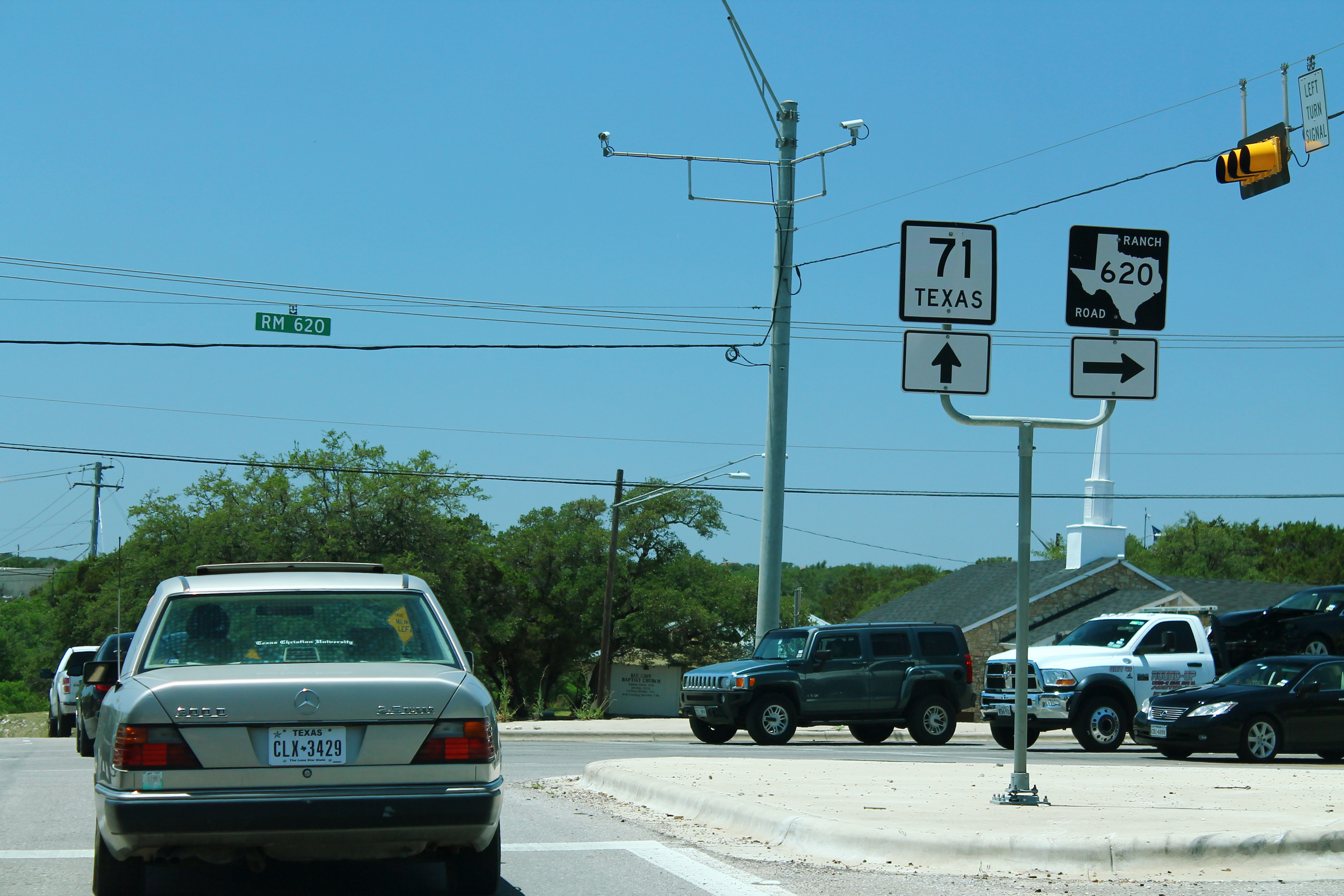
Western terminus of RM 620 at SH 71 in Bee Cave, May 2014

The western terminus of RM 620 is at SH 71 in Bee Cave in Travis County. From there, it travels north through the city of Lakeway, following along southeastern Lake Travis until it crosses the Colorado River at Mansfield Dam near Marshall Ford. To the northeast, RM 620 enters the city of Austin and intersects RM 2222. The road then intersects RM 2769 just inside the Williamson County line. To the east, the road travels concurrently with the free service roads of the SH-45 toll road crossing US-183, the 183A Toll Road, and FM 734 before separating from SH 45 and entering Round Rock. The road intersects I-35 before terminating at Bus. I-35-L in Round Rock.

The western segment of RM 620 between SH 71 and RM 2769 is designated a scenic roadway by the City of Austin.

== History ==
RM 620 was originally designated on July 9, 1945, as Farm to Market Road 620 (FM 620) from Round Rock to SH 29, the former designation of US 183 south of Liberty Hill until May 23, 1951. On May 13, 1946, the road was extended to the Travis County line. On August 26, 1948, the road was extended to the former community of Hickmuntown, also called Four Points, at the location of the current intersection with RM 2222. The road was completed on December 17, 1952, when it was extended to SH 71, known locally before August 31, 1965, as RM 93 (but was signed as SH 71 since October 31, 1955). The road was redesignated as Ranch to Market on October 1, 1956, but street addresses even for new construction along the road use FM 620, RM 620, and Ranch Road 620 interchangeably.

The SH 45 toll road running along a portion of RM 620 opened in 2006. On February 28, 2013, the section from I-35 to Bus. I-35 was cancelled and given to the city of Round Rock, along with part of BI 35-L itself. On June 27, 2019, RM Spur 620 was designated from RM 620 northeast to RM 2222 along the westernmost portion of PASS 1402 (Arterial 8), to provide a cutoff for Austin-bound traffic from RM 620 eastbound from Lakeway to proceed directly onto southbound RM 2222 and skip the Four Points intersection; following construction, that bypass opened in April 2022.

On June 27, 1995, the internal designation of the route was changed to Urban Road 620 (UR 620); the designation reverted to RM 620 with the elimination of the Urban Road system on November 15, 2018.

== Major intersections ==
County	Location	mi	km	Destinations	Notes
Travis	Bee Cave	0	0.0	SH 71 – Llano, Austin	Western terminus
Travis	Austin	12.9	20.8	RM 2222	
Travis–Williamson county line	Austin	16.9	27.2	RM 2769 (Anderson Mill Road) – Volente	
Williamson	Austin	18.5	29.8	SH 45 Toll / SH 45	Begin overlay of SH 45 over non-tolled service roads at SH 45 western terminus
Williamson	Austin	18.9	30.4	183A Toll Road / US 183 – Lockhart, Briggs	
Williamson	Austin	20.9	33.6	FM 734 (Parmer Lane) – Cedar Park	Non-tolled interchange
Williamson		22.2	35.7	SH 45 Toll east / SH 45 east – Round Rock	End overlay of SH 45
Williamson	Round Rock			North Lake Creek Drive	Interchange
Williamson	Round Rock			Chisholm Trail	Interchange; direct westbound exit only and no eastbound entrance (eastbound exit signed at North Lake Creek Drive)
Williamson	Round Rock	26.7	43.0	I-35 – Austin, Waco	Eastern terminus
1.000 mi = 1.609 km; 1.000 km = 0.621 mi: Incomplete access

== See also ==
- List of Farm to Market Roads in Texas
