= Texas State Highway Loop 1 =

Highway in Texas

State Highway Loop 1
- MoPac Expressway
- Loop 1 highlighted in red

Route information
- Length: 25.698 mi (41.357 km)
- Existed: 1967–present

Major junctions
- South end: SH 45 in Austin
- US 290 in Austin; SH 71 in Austin; US 183 in Austin
- North end: SH 45 Toll near Round Rock

Location
- Country: United States
- State: Texas
- Counties: Travis, Williamson

Highway system
- Highways in Texas; Interstate; US; State; Former; Toll; Loops; Spurs; FM/RM; Park; Rec
← SH 1	→ FM 1

Loop 1 is a freeway that provides access to the west side of Austin in the U.S. state of Texas. It is named Mopac Expressway (or, according to some highway signs, Mopac Boulevard) after the Missouri Pacific Railroad (or "MoPac"). Local residents almost always use the name "MoPac" rather than calling the road by its number, which can cause much confusion, for few signs along the road use this name.

The original section of the highway was built in the 1970s along the right-of-way of the Missouri Pacific Railroad (now owned by Union Pacific), with the railroad tracks running in the highway median between West 8th Street and Northland Drive. To the north, the tracks run along the east side of newer sections of the highway from Northland Drive to Braker Lane.

== History ==
=== Route designation ===
The first mention of Loop 1 in public record was in 1929. In 1944, the City of Austin Planning Commission (CMAC) proposed that the highway be built in parts of the under-utilized right of way owned by the MoPac Railroad. Thus, the highway was eventually given the nickname "MoPac" for its proximity to the railroad. The current Loop 1 was designated on October 27, 1967, from US 290 northward to Farm to Market Road 1325 (FM 1325). On October 24, 1985, the designation was extended southward from US 290 to SH 45.

=== Expressway construction (1969 to 2006) ===
This table contains the dates of the construction of segments of the road.

From	To	Length (mi)	Length (km)	Project start	Project completion	Notes
RM 2244 (Bee Cave Road)	RM 2222 (Northland Road)	5.4	8.7	February 1969	November 1975	Loop 1 project started with construction of the 45th Street; Interchange in February 1969.
RM 2222	US 183	4.6	7.4	September 1977	June 1981	Northern terminus of Loop 1 completed, until July 1989 - with construction of the freeway extension to FM 734.
RM 2244	Loop 360	1.9	3.1	January 1979	March 1982	Southern terminus of Loop 1 completed, until October 1989 - with construction of the freeway extension to US 290.
Loop 360	US 290	1.6	2.6	October 1983	October 1989	Southern terminus of Loop 1 completed, until November 1990 - with construction of the roadway extension to Slaughter Lane.
US 183	FM 1325 (Burnet Road) and FM 734 (Parmer Lane)	3.7	6.0	January 1986	July 1989	Northern terminus of Loop 1 completed, until October 2006 - with construction of the SH 45 North/ Loop 1 Connector toll road. Stack interchange at US 183 is constructed - involved major freeway improvements between Steck Avenue and US 183, from March 1987 to June 1992.
US 290	Slaughter Lane	3.6	5.8	January 1988	November 1990	Southern terminus of Loop 1 completed, until July 1991 - with construction of the roadway extension to La Crosse Avenue.
Slaughter Lane	La Crosse Avenue	1.0	1.6	July 1989	July 1991	Southern terminus of Loop 1 completed, until May 1994 - with construction of the roadway extension to State Highway 45 .
La Crosse Avenue	SH 45	2.5	4.0	November 1989	May 1994	Southern terminus of Loop 1 completed.
FM 734	SH 45 North/ Loop 1 Interchange	4.0	6.4	February 2003	October 2006	Construction on the SH 45 North Interchange began in September 2003. Northern terminus of Loop 1 completed.

== Route description ==
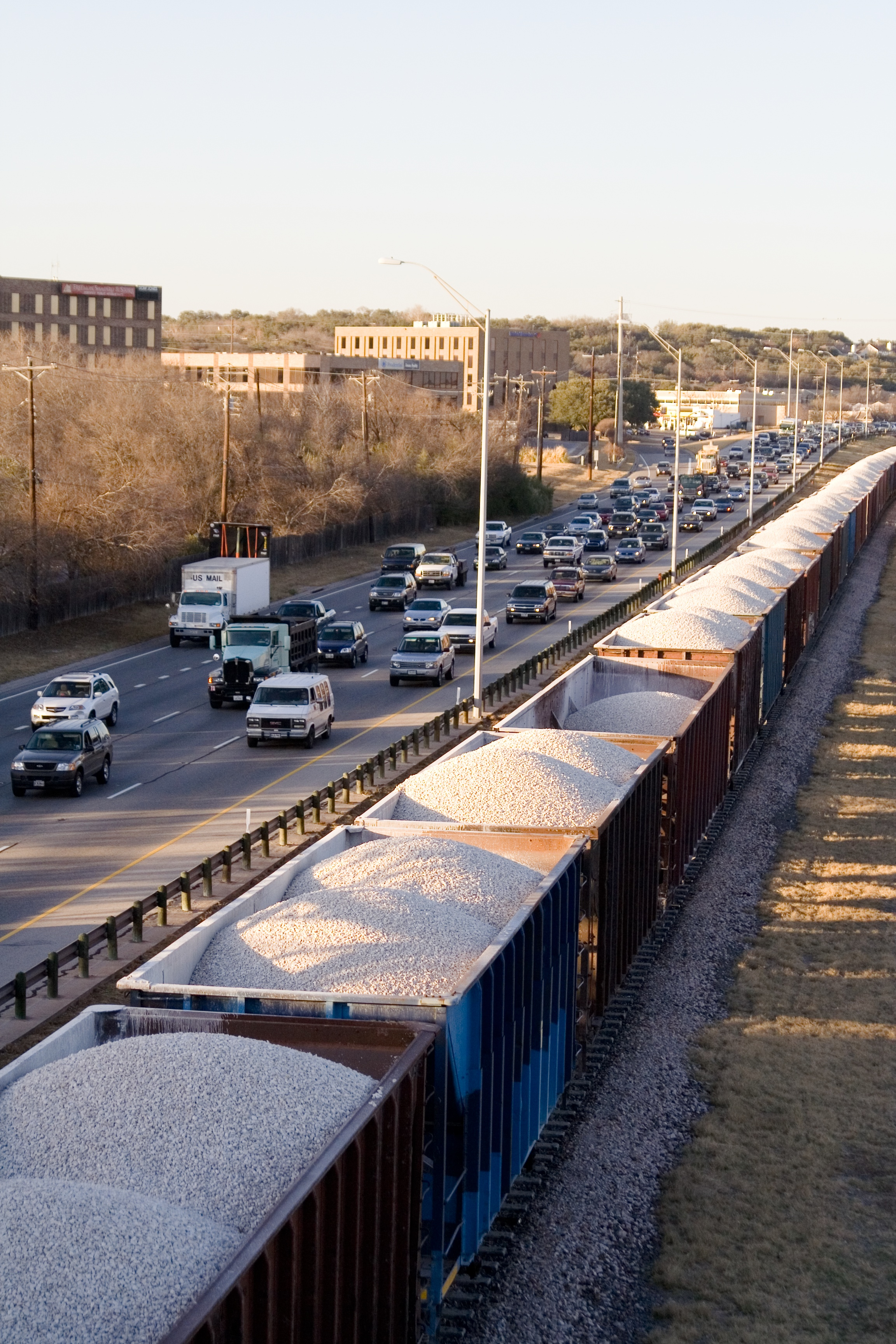
A stretch of Loop 1 over the Hancock Drive bridge, looking north-northwest. The Union Pacific railway is visible in the foreground.

Loop 1's southern terminus is at the beginning of the State Highway 45 stub south of Austin. It passes through the Circle C Ranch housing development and the Edwards Aquifer and intersects SH 71/US 290 (Ben White Boulevard) and Loop 360 (Capital of Texas Highway). It crosses the Colorado River near downtown Austin; the view of the Texas State Capitol from the bridge became one of the Capitol View Corridors protected under state and local law from obstruction by tall buildings in 1983. North of the river, the highway runs parallel to the Balcones Fault and the Missouri-Pacific Railroad (Union Pacific) before it intersects US 183 (Research Boulevard) northwest of downtown. Loop 1 travels concurrently with Farm to Market Road 1325 for several miles before the non-tolled freeway ends at Parmer Lane, spanning a distance of 22.061 miles (35.504 km).

Loop 1 is designated a scenic roadway by the City of Austin.

=== Major construction projects ===
==== Loop 1 Toll ====
North of Parmer Lane, Loop 1 continues as a limited-access toll road to the SH 45 North/Loop 1 interchange, spanning 3 miles (4.8 km). Frontage roads flank either side of the toll road to Merrilltown Drive.

The Texas Department of Transportation completed construction of the tollway as part of the 2002 Central Texas Turnpike Project (CTTP). SH 45 North, also part of the project, provides freeway access to Interstate 35 from Loop 1. The 2002 CTTP was scheduled to be completed in September 2007. However, certain sections of the project, including Loop 1 opened early and more than $100 million under budget.

If and when SH 45 is completed to the south of Austin between FM 1626 and I-35, Loop 1 will effectively serve as a full western loop to the city, being directly connected to SH 45 (and indirectly to I-35) at both ends.

==== MoPac Improvement Project ====
Loop 1 Express
- Mopac Improvement Project
- Location: Austin
- Existed: 2017–present

Since 1994, TxDOT has proposed the addition of managed lanes to portions of Loop 1. The MoPac Improvement Project was relaunched in July 2010 by the Central Texas Regional Mobility Authority (CTRMA). In December 2010, four alternative proposals were presented to the public, each of which would add one or more lanes; the "no-build" alternative was also presented. The additions would not increase the right-of-way of the highway, but would be created by reducing the width of existing lanes and reducing and/or eliminating shoulders. An environmental study was completed in August 2012 with a Finding Of No Significant Impact and a recommendation of one new travel lane in each direction, operated as express lanes. Construction began in 2013, and was originally scheduled for completion in September 2015, but by August 2016, the Central Texas Regional Mobility Authority announced further delays. The first of four tolled sections, specifically the northbound toll lane from RM 2222 to Parmer Lane, opened on October 17, 2016. The remainder of the northbound express lane, from Cesar Chavez Street to Parmer Lane, opened on October 7, 2017, and the entire southbound express lane opened on October 28, 2017.

==== MoPac Intersections Project ====
In 2013, CTRMA and TxDOT initiated an environmental study to analyze the best options to improve the MoPac intersections at Slaughter Lane and La Crosse Avenue. In December 2015, the study was completed with a Finding Of No Significant Impact for the project, which allowed it to move forward. The selected design included replacing the at-grade intersection at Slaughter Lane with a diverging diamond interchange (DDI) and the at-grade intersection at La Crosse Avenue with a diamond interchange. The project broke ground in January 2018 with Webber, LLC as the general contractor.

On August 10, 2018, the at-grade Slaughter Lane intersection was rerouted to the south as construction began on an overpass bridge on the original alignment. The completed DDI opened to traffic on November 11, 2018, with final completion occurring in Spring 2019. The La Crosse Avenue intersection began construction in Fall 2018. On March 29, 2019, the La Crosse Avenue at-grade intersection was closed for reconstruction as a bridge. The La Crosse Avenue bridge and intersection opened to traffic on April 16, 2020. The full project, including surrounding sound walls and retention ponds, was officially completed on December 16, 2020.

==== MoPac South ====
In 2013, CTRMA and TxDOT initiated an environmental study of the MoPac corridor from Cesar Chavez Street to Slaughter Lane. The environmental study identified the Express Lane(s) Alternative as the Recommended Build Alternative. In October 2015, six proposals were presented to the public, each of which would add one of more express lanes; the "no-build" alternative was also presented. In February 2016, the project was put on hold by a Save Our Springs lawsuit claiming the project had not complied with the National Environmental Policy Act's requirements for environmental studies. The lawsuit was settled on July 18, 2018 with a ruling in favor of CTRMA by the 5th Circuit U.S. Court of Appeals. However, the project was further delayed by a state moratorium on toll projects receiving funding from State Propositions 1 and 7. TxDOT gave CTRMA preliminary approval to resume planning for MoPac South in August 2019. In November 2021, the project was officially revitalized with a virtual open house, and it is currently in public planning phases.

== Exit list ==
All exits are unnumbered.

County	Location	mi	km	Destinations	Notes
Travis	Austin	0.0	0.0	SH 45 west / SH 45 Toll east	
Travis	Austin	0.7	1.1	South Bay Lane	At-grade intersection; dead end both directions, turnaround only
Travis	Austin	1.5	2.4	La Crosse Avenue	
Travis	Austin	2.3	3.7	Slaughter Lane	Diverging Diamond Interchange
Travis	Austin	2.9	4.7	Davis Lane	Southbound exit and northbound entrance
Travis	Austin	4.7	7.6	William Cannon Drive	
Travis	Austin	6.0	9.7	US 290 / SH 71 / Southwest Parkway – Johnson City, Llano, Sunset Valley	Access to Baylor Scott & White Medical Center – Austin
Travis	Austin	6.6	10.6	Frontage Road	Southbound exit only
Travis	Austin	7.5	12.1	Loop 360 (Capital of Texas Highway)	Only one exit ramp travels from southbound Loop 1 to southbound Loop 360; all others are at-grade
Travis	Austin	8.9	14.3	Barton Skyway	
Travis	Austin	9.8	15.8	RM 2244 (Bee Caves Road) / Wallingwood Drive – Rollingwood, West Lake Hills	
Travis	Austin			Roberta Crenshaw Bridge over the Colorado River	
Travis	Austin			Loop 1 Express begins	South end of variable toll lanes
Travis	Austin	10.5	16.9	Cesar Chavez Street / 5th Street / Lake Austin Boulevard	
Travis	Austin	11.2	18.0	Enfield Road	
Travis	Austin	11.7	18.8	Windsor Road	
Travis	Austin	12.3	19.8	Westover Road / Northwood Road	
Travis	Austin	12.9	20.8	35th Street – Camp Mabry	Access to Seton Shoal Creek Hospital
Travis	Austin	13.8	22.2	45th Street	
Travis	Austin	14.8	23.8	RM 2222 (Northland Drive)	
Travis	Austin			Loop 1 Express	Access point for variable toll lanes
Travis	Austin	15.9	25.6	Far West Boulevard	
Travis	Austin	16.6	26.7	Anderson Lane / Spicewood Springs Road	Direct northbound exit and southbound entrance (southbound exit signed at Steck Avenue)
Travis	Austin	17.1	27.5	Steck Avenue	No direct northbound entrance
Travis	Austin	17.3	27.8	(no name)	Northbound exit only; replaced by northbound collector distributor road underneath Steck Avenue
Travis	Austin	18.0	29.0	US 183 (Research Boulevard)	No direct southbound exit to US 183 north (signed at Capital of Texas Highway), access to Seton Northwest Hospital
Travis	Austin	18.7	30.1	Capital of Texas Highway	
Travis	Austin	19.1	30.7	Braker Lane – Q2 Stadium	Direct southbound exit and northbound entrance (northbound exit signed at Capital of Texas Highway)
Travis	Austin	20.5	33.0	FM 1325 south (Burnet Road) / Duval Road	South end of FM 1325 overlap, access to North Austin Medical Center
Travis	Austin			Loop 1 Express ends	North end of variable toll lanes; despite being signed as such, no direct access to FM 734 (Parmer Lane) exists
Travis	Austin	21.7	34.9	FM 734 (Parmer Lane)	
Travis	Austin	22.4	36.0	Scofield Ridge Parkway	Last free northbound exit before toll road begins; no direct southbound exit
Travis	Austin	22.4	36.0	Loop 1 ends Loop 1 Toll begins	Northern terminus of Loop 1 (Mopac Expressway); southern terminus of Loop 1 Toll
Travis	Austin	23.1	37.2	FM 1325 / Wells Branch Parkway / Howard Lane, Merrilltown Drive	Howard station
Travis		24.0	38.6	Merrilltown Toll Plaza	
Travis–Williamson county line		24.5	39.4	Shoreline Drive	No southbound exit
Williamson		25.6	41.2	SH 45 Toll to I-35	
1.000 mi = 1.609 km; 1.000 km = 0.621 mi: Closed/former; Concurrency terminus; Incomplete access; Tolled; Route transition
