= Interstate 35 in Texas =

Section of Interstate Highway in Texas, United States

Interstate 35
- I-35, I-35E and I-35W highlighted in red

Route information
- Maintained by TxDOT
- Length: 503.895 mi (810.940 km)
- Existed: 1959–present
- NHS: Entire route
- Restrictions: Delivery trucks prohibited in the leftmost lanes in both directions in certain urban areas of Bexar, Guadalupe, Comal, Hays, Travis, and Williamson counties

Southern section
- South end: US 83 / Victoria Street in Laredo
- Major intersections: I-69W / US 59 in Laredo; I-10 in San Antonio; I-37 / US 281 in San Antonio; I-14 / US 190 in Belton
- North end: I-35E / I-35W in Hillsboro

Northern section
- South end: I-35E / I-35W in Denton
- North end: I-35 / US 77 at Oklahoma state line near Gainesville

Location
- Country: United States
- State: Texas
- Counties: Webb, La Salle, Frio, Medina, Atascosa, Bexar, Guadalupe, Comal, Hays, Travis, Williamson, Bell, Falls, McLennan, Hill; Denton, Cooke

Highway system
- Interstate Highway System; Main; Auxiliary; Suffixed; Business; Future; Highways in Texas; Interstate; US; State; Former; Toll; Loops; Spurs; FM/RM; Park; Rec
← SH 34	→ I-35E

Interstate 35 (I-35 (Note: Some sources use "IH-35", as "IH" is an abbreviation used by the Texas Department of Transportation for Interstate Highways.)) is a major north–south Interstate Highway that runs from Laredo, Texas near the Mexican border to Duluth, Minnesota. In Texas, the highway begins in Laredo and runs north to the Red River north of Gainesville, where it crosses into Oklahoma. Along its route, it passes through the cities of San Antonio, Austin, and Waco before splitting into two branch routes just north of Hillsboro: I-35E heads northeast through Dallas, while I-35W turns northwest to run through Fort Worth. The two branches rejoin in Denton to again form I-35, which continues to the Oklahoma state line. The exit numbers for I-35E maintain the sequence of exit numbers from the southern segment of I-35, and the northern segment of I-35 follows on from the sequence of exit numbers from I-35E. I-35W maintains its own sequence of exit numbers.

In Texas, I-35 runs for just over 503 miles (810 km), which does not include the 85-mile (137 km) segment of I-35W. It does include the 97-mile (156 km) segment of I-35E. Texas contains more miles of the overall length of I-35 than any other state, almost one-third of the entire length.

The Interstate is currently undergoing an extensive renovation and expansion project, known as "My35". The project includes work on portions of the Interstate from Dallas south to Laredo. Once complete, the highway will span three lanes in each direction from Hillsboro to San Antonio.

== Route description ==
I-35 has been designated the Texas portion of the Purple Heart Trail. Signage noting this designation is being added along the route.

=== Laredo and South Texas ===
In Laredo, I-35 is between two and four mainlanes in each direction, dropping to four near milemarker 13. After running concurrently with U.S. Highway 83 (US 83) for 20 miles (32 km), the highway continues north-northeast across the South Texas Plains. The highway passes through the cities of Cotulla, Dilley, Pearsall, Devine, and Lytle before reaching San Antonio.

=== San Antonio ===
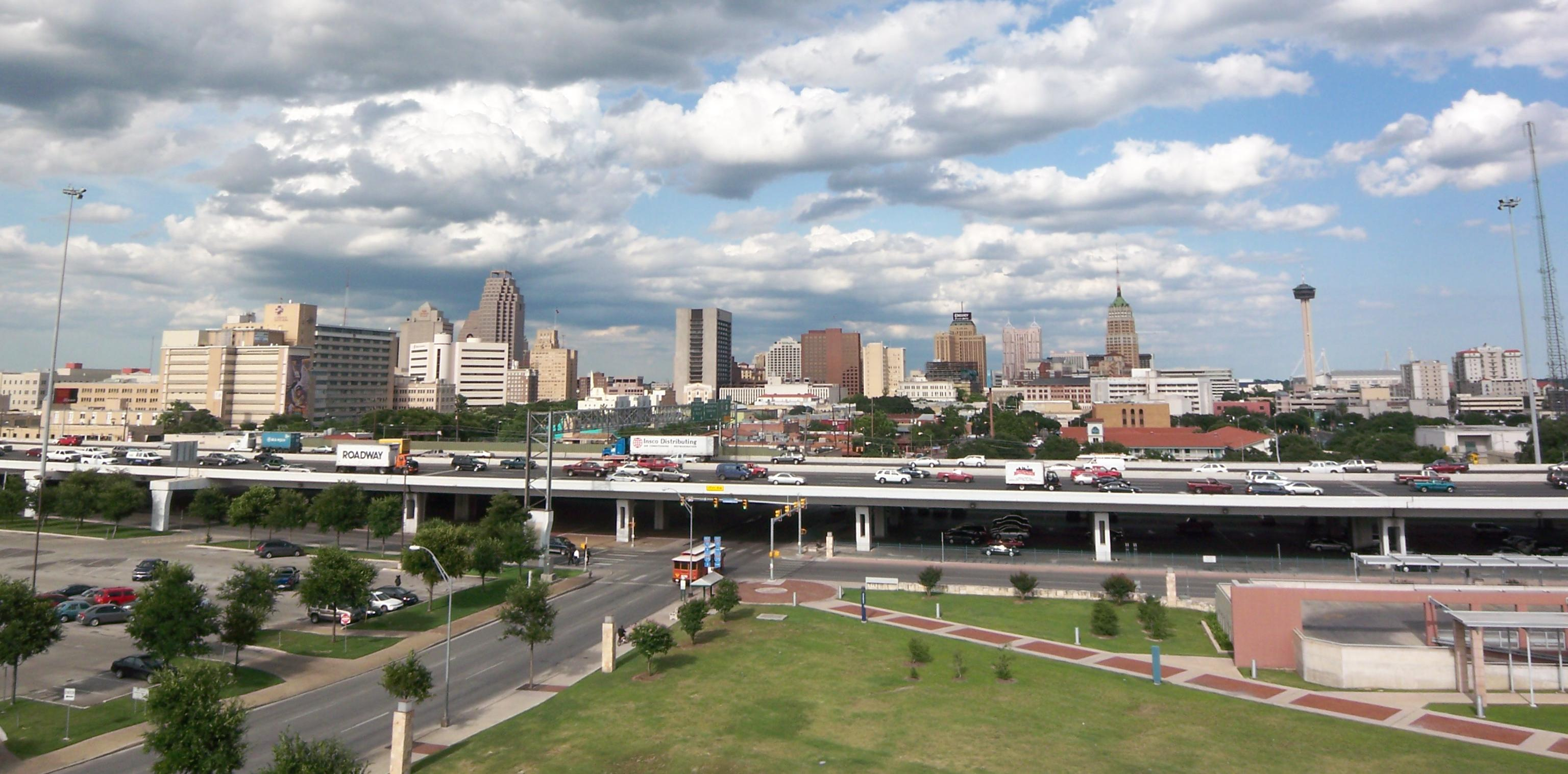
I-35 as an elevated freeway as it runs concurrently with I-10 on the western end of Downtown San Antonio

In San Antonio, I-35 is listed as the PanAm Expressway. It starts out as four lanes from the south until it reaches State Highway 422 Spur (Spur 422, Poteet-Jourdanton Freeway), expanding to six to eight mainlanes of travel. Its southern point begins in the southwest corner of town and travels northeast, crossing I-410 near its southwest point. At the southwest corner of Downtown, it reaches an intersection with I-10, US 87, and US 90. US 90 continues east and west from this junction, while I-10 westbound/US 87 northbound joins with I-35 northbound along the westside of Downtown. In this section, it splits lanes to form two levels, a lower one for local traffic and a higher one for express traffic. They briefly rejoin near the northwest corner of Downtown to allow I-10/US 87 to split off and go northwest.

I-35 continues, resplitting lanes again as it curves around the northwest corner of Downtown and turns east. It rejoins the lanes as it goes through an intersection at the northeast corner of Downtown, where I-37's northern terminus is located, while US 281 will continue on the north–south freeway. I-35 continues east for a few miles until it begins to curve back to the northeast. It merges with I-410 on its eastern north–south leg from its northbound direction in a triangular interchange and continues north concurrently from there. A few miles later, I-410 will split off onto its northern west–east leg, while I-35 resumes its north-northeast course past the northeast corner of the city.

Trucks are restricted from travel in the far left lane of I-35 in either direction throughout the San Antonio area. The restriction covers Bexar, Guadalupe, and Comal counties.

=== Austin ===
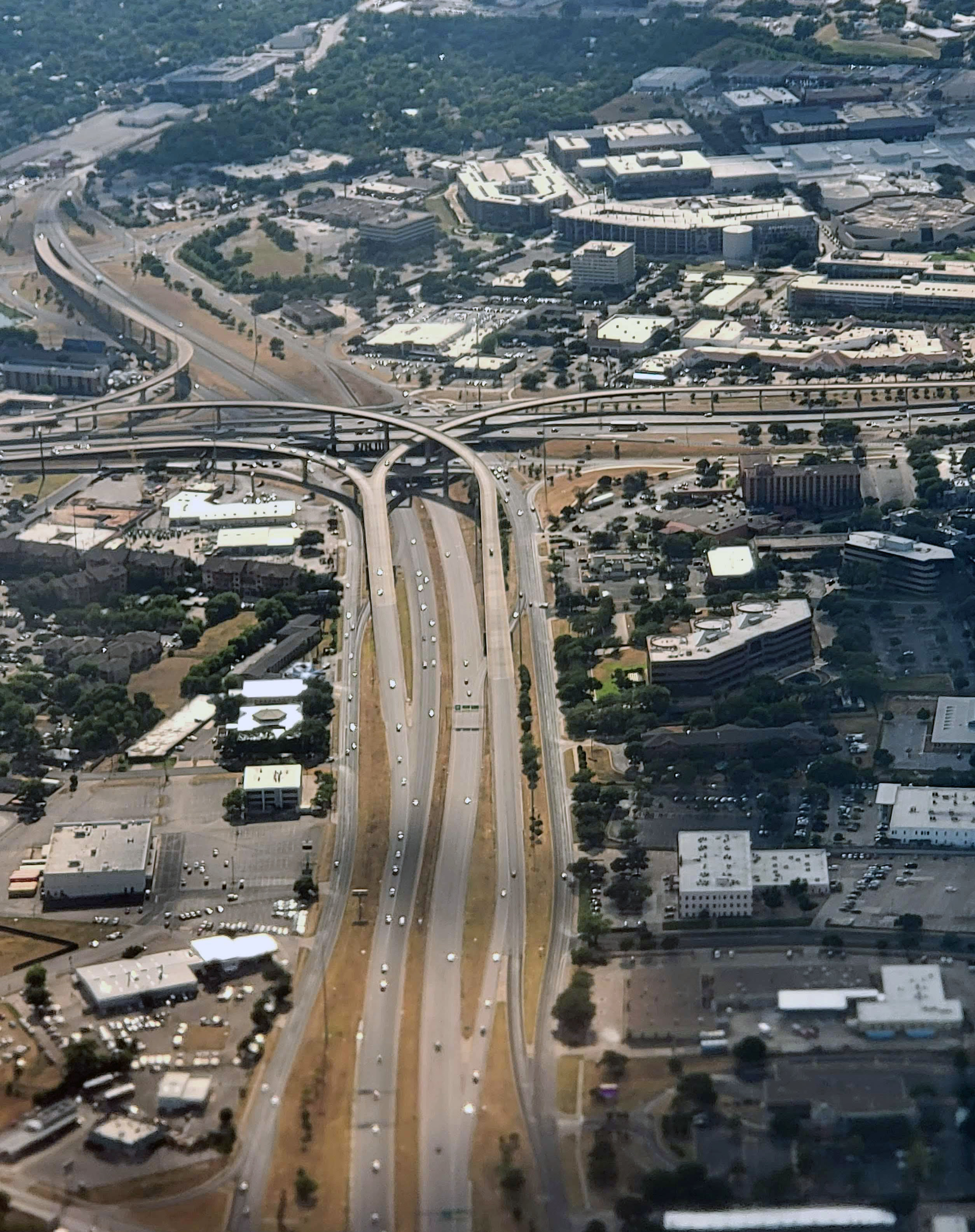
The I-35 and US 290 junction in Austin.

In Austin, I-35 is named Interregional Highway. Through most of the greater Austin area, I-35 is three to four lanes in each direction, dropping to three lanes north of Williamson County. It forms the eastern boundary of Downtown Austin and also passes through the eastside of the University of Texas campus. The freeway divides the prosperous downtown from the historically Black neighborhoods of East Austin. I-35 is cosigned with US 290 through central Austin.

Trucks are restricted from travel in the far left lane of I-35 in either direction throughout the Austin area. The restriction covers Hays and Travis counties and most of Williamson County and ends north of Jarrell, where I-35 is reduced to three lanes in each direction.

I-35 is split into two decks between Farm to Market Road 969 (FM 969, Martin Luther King Jr. Boulevard) and Airport Boulevard, north of Downtown Austin. Both the upper and lower decks are signed as I-35 and US 290, and they use a common set of exit numbers, with some exit numbers duplicated between the two decks. The upper deck lanes are express lanes, with no on- or offramps. Drivers wishing to exit between FM 969 and Airport Boulevard must use the lower deck.

The I-35 corridor between San Antonio and Austin is considered one of the most congested stretches of highway in the Interstate System. Much of this traffic is due to I-35 being considered one of the primary NAFTA corridors. Efforts to alleviate the congestion include State Highway 130 (SH 130), which forms an I-35 bypass loop to the east of Austin. Many local and regional governance organizations have ongoing studies on other methods to improve mobility on I-35, which include such features as commuter rail lines and additional managed lanes.

=== Waco and Central Texas ===
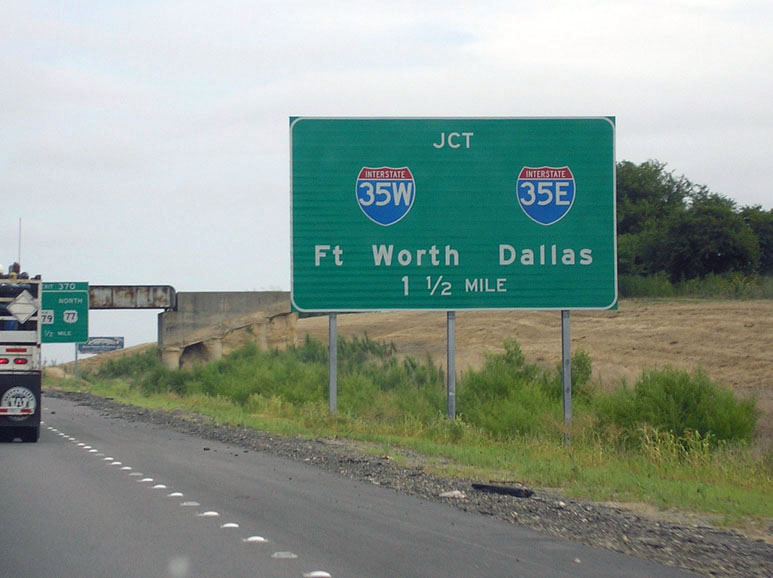
Signage for northbound I-35 motorists as the highway prepares to split near Hillsboro

In Waco, I-35 is known as the Jack Kultgen Freeway. I-35 has six to eight lanes through the city of Waco. It passes just to the west of the Baylor University campus and crosses the Brazos River adjacent to McLane Stadium, the new home of Baylor Bears football. Beginning in Waco and continuing up until just before the I-35E/I-35W split north of Hillsboro, I-35 is cosigned with US 77.

=== Denton and North Texas ===
Just southwest of Denton, I-35W and I-35E join to reform I-35, which then continues north to the Oklahoma state line. The exit numbers on I-35 continue on from the last exit of I-35E.

Just north of Denton, US 77 is cosigned with I-35 through to the Oklahoma state line, although it is not signed as such.

== History ==
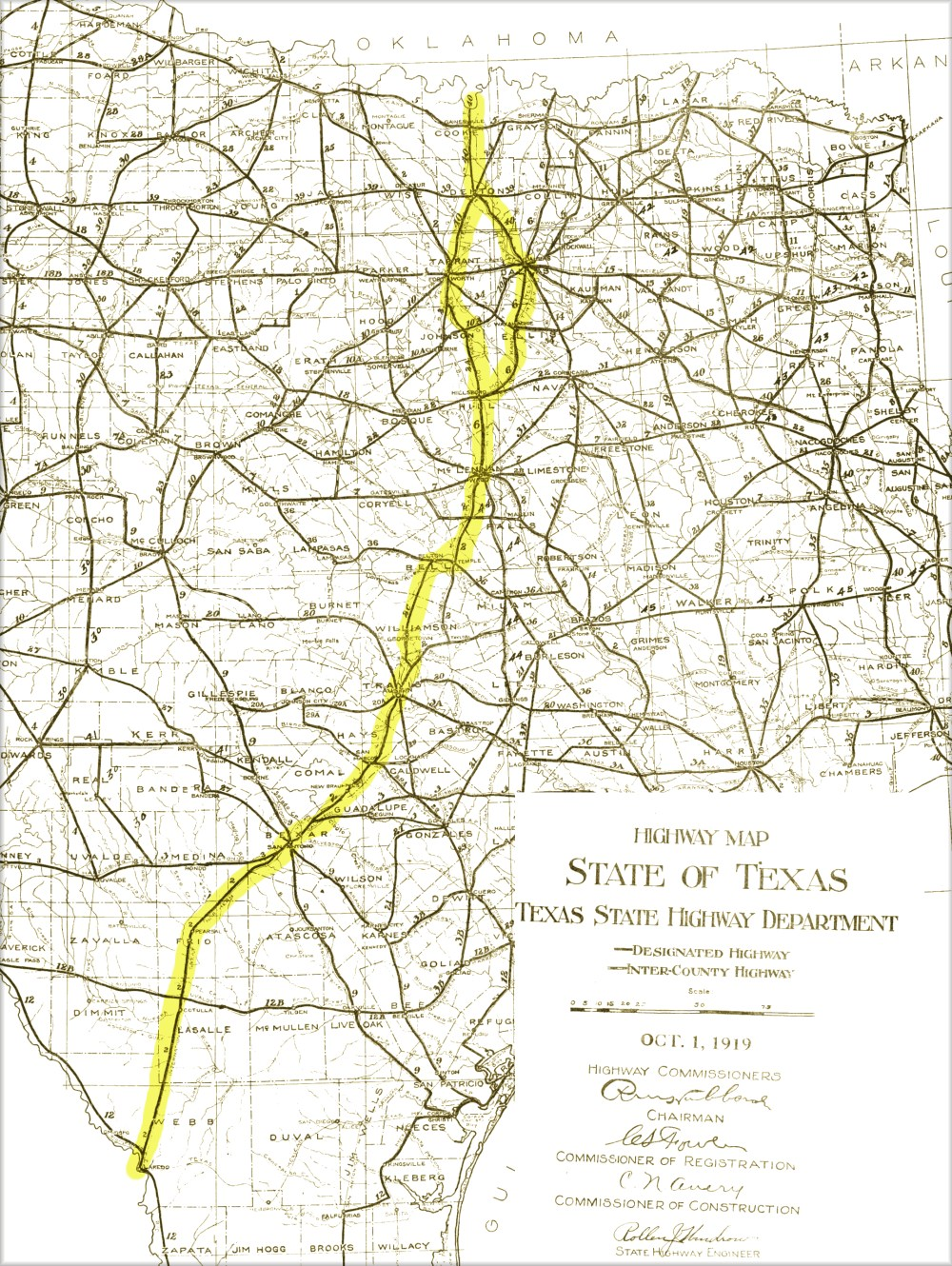
Most of I-35 was built along existing roadways, as shown on this 1919 State Highway map. The actual location of I-35 is added as a yellow overlay.

=== Central Texas ===
The right-of-way for the future I-35 in Austin began being purchased in 1946, running along the so-called "inter-regional highway" (named for the precursor to the current Interstate Highway System). The formal opening of I-35 in Austin took place in 1962. The alignment was chosen to line up with US 81 and with East Avenue, which formed the eastern boundary of downtown Austin and separated it from East Austin. US 81 has since been truncated and does not extend to Austin, and East Avenue today forms part of the frontage road for I-35 through downtown Austin.

In 1963, while constructing an overpass in between Round Rock and Georgetown, Inner Space Cavern was discovered after a space was found more than once at 33 feet (10 m) below grade. A three-foot (0.91 m) hole was drilled into the space and an engineer was lowered into the hole for exploration. Later, the Texas Speleological Association mapped the cavity, and the Texas highway department sealed the hole and completed the Interstate.

In 1975, a two-mile (3.2 km) set of elevated express lanes were added to I-35 between 15th Street and Airport Boulevard. The reason double-decking was used is because the highway is bounded in the area by the University of Texas campus on the west and by the Mount Calvary Cemetery on the east, restricting the available right-of-way. The lower deck kept its original configuration, which featured short on- and offramps with limited visibility. In 2000, some offramps on the lower deck were removed in response to the already dangerous conditions becoming more so as traffic levels on the road increased. I-35, in general, and the double-decked section, in particular, have been viewed as a social dividing line between the central Austin and UT communities and the more economically depressed East Austin neighborhoods.

I-35, at one time, had one of the few at-grade railroad crossings in the Interstate Highway System, near Airport Boulevard in Austin. The crossing was bridged across during the 1970s.

Throughout 2018 to 2021, construction commenced to add three additional flyovers at the intersection of US 183 and I-35. When construction on the southbound I-35 to northbound US 183 flyover was completed, the preexisting northbound I-35 to northbound US 183 flyover was demolished on May 8, 2021, in favor of a replacement flyover completed on September 10, 2021, due to concerns over the latter flyover's incline being too steep for larger vehicles to navigate without delaying other traffic.

The northern interchange at SH 45 was partially affected by a tornado on March 21, 2022, when a large light pole was ripped off its foundation, the debris resting on the side of a flyover, as seen from photos captured by KXAN-TV.

=== North Texas ===
Construction on I-35 in the Dallas–Fort Worth region began around 1960 with the upgrading of US 77 to Interstate standards between Dallas and Denton. By 1965, I-35 was complete from Dallas to the Oklahoma state line, and, by 1967, it was complete from both Dallas and Fort Worth southward to Austin. The remaining segment of I-35W from Fort Worth to Denton was not completed until 1969.

== Future ==
=== Main Street Texas expansion project ===
The Main Street Texas expansion project primarily focuses on expanding the number of main lanes from four to six through McLennan and Bell counties. It also calls for complete replacement of the mainlane bridges over the Brazos River and extensive renovations to frontage roads and interchanges throughout the corridor. Funding for the project was secured in increments, and the first part of the project began in 2010. Construction largely wrapped up in the middle of 2019 with the completion of the Temple segment except for the portion of freeway running through the Downtown Waco area. For that section of the project, $280 million in funding has yet to be secured.

=== Capital Express expansion project ===
The Capital Express project is a 28-mile (45 km) highway expansion in Williamson, Travis, and Hays counties between from SH 45 north to SH 45 southeast. The Texas Department of Transportation (TxDOT) has broken the expansion project into three components: the Capital Express North, Capital Express Central, and Capital Express South projects.

The $500 million Capital Express North project is set to begin construction in late 2022 and runs from SH 45 north to US 290 east, adding one high-occupancy vehicle lane (HOV lane) in each direction, reconstruction of six bridges, and a new diverging diamond interchange at Wells Branch Parkway. The $548 million Capital Express South project, between SH 45 southeast and SH 71 would include new HOV lanes in each direction and two miles (3.2 km) of elevated managed lanes from Stassney to Slaughter lanes, and two miles (3.2 km) of new bypass lanes below intersections, set to begin construction in late 2022.

The $4.9 billion Capital Express Central project was slatted begin in late 2025 and would rebuild the highway in central and Downtown Austin. The plans call for widened main lanes and frontage roads along with four new managed lanes, totaling up to 20 lanes wide. The project would demolish the double-deck section of the highway between Airport Boulevard and Martin Luther King Jr. Boulevard, as well as the elevated highway between Cesar Chavez Street and East 15th Street. The new highway would be buried below-grade, while some sections may be covered with caps-and-stitches containing parkland; the funding for the caps are not included in the project price tag, but would need to be funded by the Capital Area Metropolitan Planning Organization (CAMPO) and the City of Austin. Approximately 140 residential and commercial properties in the project's footprint would need to be demolished using eminent domain. In August 2023, TXDOT released the project's environmental impact statement and announced that the project received environmental clearance under the National Environmental Policy Act. Construction could begin as early as Summer 2024 and last about a decade.

==== Controversy ====
The Capital Express project has received pushback from residents and politicians in Austin, who claim that the expansion would displace residents, worsen traffic due to induced demand, and contribute to increased carbon emissions in the city. Critics of the expansion are requesting TxDOT study alternate proposals, including re-routing I-35 traffic along SH 130, or removing the highway and replacing it with an at-grade boulevard through central Austin.

In June 2022, a lawsuit was filed against TxDOT by three Texas organizations—Environment Texas, Rethink35, and Texas Public Interest Research Group—alleging that by dividing the expansion project into three subprojects (The Capital Express North, Central, and South projects, respectively), TxDOT is avoiding "more rigorous, legally required environmental review and public engagement of a single larger project". One year later in June 2023, a spokesperson for Rethink35 requested the case be dismissed while they try to explore other legal options. A judge dismissed the case soon thereafter.

== Exit list ==
County	Location	mi	km	Exit	Destinations	Notes
Webb	Laredo	0.00	0.00		US 83 south (Santa Ursula Avenue) to Victoria Street east / SH 359 / I-35 BL south – Zapata, Hebbronville, Laredo International Bridge 1, Downtown, Laredo International Bridge 2	At-grade intersection; one-way street, southbound exit; southern terminus; south end of US 83 overlap; future south end of I-27 overlap; highway continues as US 83
Webb	Laredo	0.00	0.00		US 83 (San Dario Avenue) / Victoria Street	At-grade intersection; one-way street, northbound entrance; southern terminus; south end of US 83 overlap
Webb	Laredo	0.2	0.32	1A	Scott Street, Washington Street	Southbound exit and northbound entrance
Webb	Laredo	0.7	1.1	1B	Park Street, Sanchez Street	Southbound exit and northbound entrance
Webb	Laredo	1.4	2.3	2	Bus. US 59-Z – Freer, Corpus Christi, Houston	Access to Laredo International Airport
Webb	Laredo	2.2	3.5	3A	Calton Road, Hillside Road	
Webb	Laredo	3.1	5.0	3B	I-35 BL (San Bernardo Avenue) / Mann Road	
Webb	Laredo	3.8	6.1	4	Del Mar Boulevard, Santa Maria Avenue	
Webb	Laredo	4.2	6.8	4A	FM 1472	Northbound exit and southbound entrance
Webb	Laredo	4.5	7.2	4B	International Boulevard, Las Cruces Drive, Shiloh Drive	Signed as exit 7 southbound
Webb	Laredo	6.1	9.8	5	San Isidro Parkway	Northbound exit only; formerly signed as exit 6
Webb	Laredo	6.6	10.6	8A	I-69W south / US 59 west (Loop 20 west) / World Trade Bridge	Signed as exit 8 southbound; I-69W exits 2A-B; current northern terminus of I-69W; full stack interchange under construction
Webb	Laredo	6.8	10.9	8B	Future I-69W north / US 59 east / Loop 20 east (Bob Bullock Loop) / Frontage Road – Texas A&M Intl Univ	Southbound access via exit 9; access to Laredo International Airport and Doctors Hospital
Webb	Laredo	8.6	13.8	9	Killam Industrial Boulevard	Southbound exit and northbound entrance
Webb	Laredo	10.7	17.2	12A	Port Laredo	Northbound exit only
Webb	Laredo	11.8	19.0	12B	Carrier Drive, Uniroyal Road	Signed as exits 12 (Carrier Drive) and 13 (Uniroyal Road) southbound
Webb	Botines	17.9	28.8	18	Future I-27 north / US 83 north – Carrizo Springs, Uvalde	North end of US 83 overlap; future north end of I-27 overlap
Webb	Webb	20.6	33.2	22	Webb Interchange	
Webb		23.1	37.2	24	SH 255 (Camino Colombia Road)	
Webb	Callaghan	26.4	42.5	27	Callaghan Interchange	
Webb		32.0	51.5	32	San Roman Interchange	
Webb	Encinal	37.6	60.5	38	I-35 BL north – Encinal	Northbound exit and southbound entrance
La Salle	Encinal	38.7	62.3	39	I-35 BL south / SH 44 – Encinal, Freer	
La Salle		48.1	77.4	48	Caiman Creek Interchange	
La Salle	Artesia Wells	55.4	89.2	56	FM 133 – Artesia Wells, Catarina	
La Salle		62.6	100.7	63	Elm Creek Interchange	
La Salle	Cotulla	65.4	105.3	65	I-35 BL north – Cotulla	
La Salle	Cotulla	67.2	108.1	67	FM 468 – Big Wells	
La Salle	Cotulla	68.0	109.4	69	I-35 BL south – Cotulla	Signed as exit 68 northbound
La Salle	Gardendale	72.9	117.3	74	Gardendale	
La Salle	Millett	77.4	124.6	77	FM 469 – Millett	
La Salle–Frio county line	Dilley	82.0	132.0	82	I-35 BL north / County Line Road – Dilley	
Frio	Dilley	83.5	134.4	84	SH 85 – Charlotte, Carrizo Springs, Crystal City	
Frio	Dilley	84.6	136.2	85	FM 117 – Batesville	
Frio	Dilley	86.3	138.9	86	I-35 BL south – Dilley	
Frio	Derby	91.4	147.1	91	Spur 581 north / FM 1583 – Derby	
Frio	Pearsall	99.4	160.0	99	I-35 BL north / FM 1581 – Pearsall, Divot	
Frio	Pearsall	99.9	160.8	101	FM 140 – Pearsall, Uvalde	Signed as exit 100 northbound
Frio	Pearsall	104.2	167.7	104	I-35 BL south	
Frio	Moore	110.6	178.0	111	US 57 – Eagle Pass	Northern terminus of US 57
Frio	Moore	113.4	182.5	114	FM 462 – Bigfoot, Yancey	
Medina	Devine	120.2	193.4	121	SH 132 north – Devine	
Medina	Devine	122.4	197.0	122	SH 173 – Hondo, Devine, Jourdanton	
Medina	Devine	124.3	200.0	124	FM 463 / Bigfoot Road – Devine	
Medina		125.7	202.3	125	CR 770	Northbound exit only
Medina	Natalia	127.1	204.5	127	FM 471 – Natalia	
Atascosa	Lytle	131.2	211.1	131	FM 2790 / FM 3175 (Benton City Road) – Lytle	
Bexar	Lytle	133.3	214.5	133	SH 132 south – Lytle	Southbound exit and northbound entrance
Bexar	Atascosa	134.5	216.5	135	Luckey Road	
Bexar	Atascosa	136.7	220.0	137	Shepherd Road	
Bexar	Atascosa	138.4	222.7	139	Kinney Road	
Bexar	Von Ormy	140.0	225.3	140	Loop 1604 (Anderson Loop) – Somerset	
Bexar	Von Ormy	141.2	227.2	141	Benton City Road – Von Ormy	
Bexar	San Antonio	142.3	229.0	142	Medina River Turnaround	Southbound entrance only; Former northbound exit
Bexar	San Antonio	143.1	230.3	144	Fischer Road	
Bexar	San Antonio	144.5	232.6	145A	I-410 (Connally Loop) / SH 16 / SH 130 north	I-410 exit 53; access to San Antonio International Airport
Bexar	San Antonio	145.3	233.8	145B	Loop 353 north (New Laredo Highway)	No northbound entrance
Bexar	San Antonio	145.9	234.8	146	Cassin Road	Southbound exit is via exit 147
Bexar	San Antonio	147.5	237.4	147	Somerset Road	
Bexar	San Antonio	147.9	238.0	148	Spur 422 to SH 16 south / Palo Alto Road – Poteet	Signed as exit 149 southbound; Access to Southwest General Hospital
Bexar	San Antonio	147.9	238.0	148A	Spur 422 to SH 16 south – Poteet	Closed in around 2008-2009; now a single exit
Bexar	San Antonio	147.9	238.0	148B	Palo Alto Road	Closed in around 2008-2009; now a single exit
Bexar	San Antonio	149.1	240.0	150A	Zarzamora Street	
Bexar	San Antonio	150.0	241.4	150B	Loop 13 (Military Drive)	Access to Stinson Municipal Airport
Bexar	San Antonio	150.8	242.7	151	Southcross Boulevard	
Bexar	San Antonio	151.6	244.0	152A	Division Avenue	
Bexar	San Antonio	152.4	245.3	152B	Malone Avenue, Theo Avenue	
Bexar	San Antonio	153.2	246.6	153	I-10 east (José López Freeway) / US 87 south / US 90 (Rodriguez Freeway) – Houston, Del Rio	South end of I-10/US 87 overlap, exit 572 westbound.
Bexar	San Antonio	153.9	247.7	154A	Loop 353 south (Nogalitos Street) / San Marcos Street	
Bexar	San Antonio	154.4	248.5	154B	South Laredo Street, Cevallos Street	South end of double deck highway
Bexar	San Antonio	154.7	249.0	155A	Spur 536 (South Alamo Street) – The Alamo	
Bexar	San Antonio	155.2	249.8	155B	Frio Street, Cesar E. Chavez Boulevard – Downtown San Antonio	North end of double deck highway
Bexar	San Antonio	155.7	250.6	156	I-10 west (McDermott Freeway) / US 87 north – El Paso	North end of I-10/US 87 overlap; I-10 exit 570 eastbound
Bexar	San Antonio	155.7	250.6	155C	West Houston Street, Commerce Street	Southbound exit only; south end of double deck highway
Bexar	San Antonio	156.3	251.5	157A	San Pedro Avenue, Main Avenue, Lexington Avenue	
Bexar	San Antonio	156.7	252.2	157B	McCullough Avenue, Brooklyn Avenue	Access to Baptist Medical Center and Metropolitan Methodist Hospital
Bexar	San Antonio	157.0	252.7	157C	St. Mary's Street	Northbound exit only
Bexar	San Antonio	156.9	252.5	158	I-37 south (Adams Freeway) / US 281 (McAllister Freeway) – Corpus Christi, Johnson City	Signed as exits 158A (north) and 158B (south) southbound; northern terminus of I-37; I-37 exit 142 northbound; north end of double deck highway
Bexar	San Antonio	157.6	253.6	158C	Loop 368 (Broadway) / North Alamo Street	Northbound exit is via exit 158
Bexar	San Antonio	158.4	254.9	159A	New Braunfels Avenue	
Bexar	San Antonio	158.7	255.4	159B	Walters Street – Fort Sam Houston	
Bexar	San Antonio	160.1	257.7	160	Frost Bank Center Drive	Northbound exit is via exit 159B
Bexar	San Antonio	160.2	257.8	160	Splashtown Drive	Northbound exit and southbound entrance
Bexar	San Antonio	161.3	259.6	161	Binz-Englemann Road	Northbound exit and southbound entrance
Bexar	San Antonio	161.6	260.1	162	I-410 south (Connally Loop)	Northbound exit and southbound entrance, I-410 north exit 31
Bexar	San Antonio	161.9	260.6	162	Binz-Englemann Road – Brooke Army Medical Center	Southbound exit and northbound entrance
Bexar	San Antonio	162.0	260.7	163	Petroleum Drive – Brooke Army Medical Center	Northbound exit and southbound entrance
Bexar	San Antonio	163.1	262.5	163	I-410 south (Connally Loop)	South end of I-410 overlap; southbound exit and northbound entrance
Bexar	San Antonio	163.6	263.3	164A	Rittiman Road	
Bexar	San Antonio	164.8	265.2	164B	Eisenhauer Road	
Bexar	San Antonio	164.9	265.4	165	FM 1976 (Walzem Road)	
Bexar	San Antonio	166.4	267.8	166	I-410 west (Connally Loop) / Loop 368 south	North end of I-410 overlap, east exit 27; access to San Antonio International Airport
Bexar	San Antonio	165.8	266.8	167A	Randolph Boulevard – Windcrest	Northbound exit is via exit 166A
Bexar	San Antonio	167.2	269.1	167B	Thousand Oaks Drive, Starlight Terrace	Signed as exit 166A northbound
Bexar	San Antonio	167.8	270.0	168	Weidner Road	
Bexar	San Antonio	168.6	271.3	169	PA 1502 (Wurzbach Parkway) / O'Connor Road	
Bexar	San Antonio	169.5	272.8	170A	Judson Road	Signed as exit 170 southbound
Bexar	San Antonio–Live Oak line	170.0	273.6	170B	Toepperwein Road	Southbound exit is part of exit 172
Bexar	Live Oak	170.4	274.2	171	SH 218 (Pat Booker Road) – Universal City, Randolph AFB, Live Oak, Converse	Southbound exit is via exit 172
Bexar	Universal City	171.0	275.2	172	Loop 1604 (Anderson Loop)	
Bexar	Selma	172.2	277.1	173	Olympia Parkway, Retama Parkway, Forum Parkway	
Bexar	Selma	173.0	278.4	174A	FM 1518 – Selma, Schertz	
Guadalupe	Schertz	174.0	280.0	174B	Schertz Parkway	
Guadalupe	Schertz	174.9	281.5	175	FM 3009 (Natural Bridge Caverns Road/Roy Richard Drive) – Schertz, Garden Ridge	
Guadalupe	Schertz	175.9	283.1	176	Cibolo Valley Drive	
Comal	Schertz	176.7	284.4	177	FM 482 / FM 2252	
Comal	Schertz	178.3	286.9	178	FM 1103 (Hubertus Road) – Cibolo	
Comal	Schertz	180.2	290.0	180	Schwab Road	
Comal	New Braunfels	181.7	292.4	182	Engel Road	
Comal	New Braunfels	183.2	294.8	183	Solms Road	
Comal	New Braunfels	184.3	296.6	184	Loop 337 / FM 482 / Rueckle Road	
Comal	New Braunfels	185.1	297.9	185	I-35 BL north / FM 1044 – New Braunfels	
Comal	New Braunfels	185.9	299.2	186	Walnut Avenue	
Comal	New Braunfels	186.9	300.8	187	FM 725 (Seguin Avenue) – Lake McQueeney	
Comal	New Braunfels	187.7	302.1	188	Guadalupe River Turnaround	Northbound exit only
Comal	New Braunfels	188.0	302.6	189	SH 46 / Loop 337 – Seguin, Boerne	Access to New Braunfels Regional Airport
Comal	New Braunfels	188.9	304.0	190A	I-35 BL south – New Braunfels	Signed as exit 190 northbound
Comal	New Braunfels	190.4	306.4	190B	Post Road	Southbound exit and northbound entrance
Comal	New Braunfels	190.5	306.6	191	FM 306 – Canyon Lake, Gruene	
Comal	New Braunfels	191.4	308.0	193	Conrads Lane, Kohlenberg Road	
Comal		194.7	313.3	195	Watson Lane, Old Bastrop Road	
Comal		196.3	315.9	196	FM 1102 (York Creek Road)	
Hays	San Marcos	198.7	319.8	199	Posey Road	Signed as exit 197 northbound
Hays	San Marcos	199.0	320.3	200	Centerpoint Road	
Hays	San Marcos	200.1	322.0	201	McCarty Lane	
Hays	San Marcos	202.3	325.6	202	RM 12 (Wonder World Drive) – Wimberley	Access to Central Texas Medical Center
Hays	San Marcos	203.6	327.7	204	SH 123 east / Loop 82 west – Seguin	Access to Downtown San Marcos via CM Allen Parkway or Loop 82 west; new exit replaced C. M. Allen Parkway signage
Hays	San Marcos	204.3	328.8	204B	C. M. Allen Parkway	southbound exit only; replaced by TX 82 & 123 signage
Hays	San Marcos	204.9	329.8	205	SH 80 east / SH 142 east / SH 21 east – Bastrop, Luling, Lockhart	
Hays	San Marcos	205.6	330.9	206	Loop 82 (Aquarena Springs Drive)	
Hays	San Marcos	207.3	333.6	207	River Ridge Parkway	
Hays	San Marcos	207.5	333.9	208	Blanco River / Chuck Nash Loop	
Hays	San Marcos	210.1	338.1	210	Yarrington Road	
Hays	Kyle	212.5	342.0	213	RM 150 (Center Street) – Kyle	
Hays	Kyle	214.5	345.2	215	FM 1626 (Kyle Parkway)	Access to Seton Medical Center Hays
Hays	Kyle	216.7	348.7	217	RM 967 / Kyle Crossing	
Hays	Buda	217.3	349.7	219	Robert S. Light Boulevard	Northbound exit and southbound entrance
Hays	Buda	218.8	352.1	220	FM 2001 (Cabelas Drive) – Buda, Niederwald	
Hays	Buda	221.0	355.7	221	Main Street	Southbound exit and northbound entrance
Travis	Austin	221.5	356.5	223	FM 1327 – Creedmoor	Northbound access via exit 220
Travis	Austin	221.8	357.0	223A	SH 45 Toll east to SH 130 Toll	Southbound access via exit 223
Travis	Austin	222.9	358.7	225	To FM 1626 / Onion Creek Parkway	
Travis	Austin	224.7	361.6	226	To FM 1626 / Slaughter Creek Overpass (Brezza Lane)	
Travis	Austin	225.8	363.4	227	To Loop 275 (South Congress Avenue) via Slaughter Lane	
Travis	Austin	227.9	366.8	228	William Cannon Drive	
Travis	Austin	229.3	369.0	229	Stassney Lane	Signed as exit 228 northbound
Travis	Austin	229.6	369.5	230	Ben White Boulevard, Woodward Street	Signed as exit 231 southbound
Travis	Austin	230.2	370.5	231	US 290 west / SH 71 – Johnson City, Bastrop, Austin-Bergstrom International Airport	South end of US 290 overlap; signed as exit 230 southbound
Travis	Austin	231.5	372.6	232A	Oltorf Street	Signed as exit 232 southbound
Travis	Austin	232.2	373.7	232B	Woodland Avenue	Signed as exit 232 southbound
Travis	Austin	232.9	374.8	233	Riverside Drive	
Travis	Austin			Bridge over the Colorado River (Lady Bird Lake)		
Travis	Austin	233.2	375.3	234A	Cesar Chavez Street, Holly Street	Signed as Holly Street only northbound
Travis	Austin	233.9	376.4	234B	Cesar Chavez Street, 2nd Street, 4th Street	Northbound exit and southbound entrance
Travis	Austin	234.6	377.6	234B	8th Street, 3rd Streets – Huston–Tillotson University	Southbound exit and northbound entrance
Travis	Austin	234.3	377.1	234C	6th Street, 12th Street	Northbound exit and southbound entrance
Travis	Austin	234.9	378.0	234C	12th Street, 11th Street – State Capitol	Southbound exit and northbound entrance
Travis	Austin			South end of double deck highway; upper deck is Express		
Travis	Austin	235.0	378.2	235A	15th Street, MLK Boulevard – University of Texas, State Capitol	Access to University Medical Center Brackenridge
Travis	Austin	235.6	379.2	235B	Manor Road	Lower deck only
Travis	Austin	235.9	379.6	236	Dean Keeton Street, 32nd-38½ streets	Lower deck only; signed as exits 236A (Dean Keeton Street, 32nd Street) and 236B (38½ Street) southbound, access to St. David's Medical Center
Travis	Austin			North end of double deck highway		
Travis	Austin	237.0	381.4	237A	Airport Boulevard	
Travis	Austin	237.4	382.1	237B	51st Street, Cameron Road	Signed as exit 238A southbound, access to Dell Children's Medical Center
Travis	Austin	237.9	382.9	238A	RM 2222 west	Southbound exit is via 238B
Travis	Austin	238.3	383.5	238B	US 290 east – Houston	North end of US 290 overlap
Travis	Austin	238.7– 239.6	384.2– 385.6	240	US 183 (Anderson Lane) / St. Johns Avenue – Lockhart, Lampasas, Austin-Bergstrom International Airport	Signed as exits 239 (south) and 240 (north) northbound
Travis	Austin	240.1	386.4	241	Rundberg Lane	
Travis	Austin	241.7	389.0	243	Braker Lane	
Travis	Austin	243.1	391.2	244	Tech Ridge Boulevard, Yager Lane	Southbound exit is via exit 245
Travis	Austin	244.7	393.8	245	FM 734 (Parmer Lane)	
Travis	Austin	246.3	396.4	246	Howard Lane (Loop 275 south)	Signed as exit 245 northbound
Travis	Pflugerville	246.5	396.7	247	FM 1825 / Wells Branch Parkway – Pflugerville	
Travis	Pflugerville	247.6	398.5	248	Grand Avenue Parkway	
Travis–Williamson county line	Round Rock	249.3	401.2	250	SH 45 (Louis Henna Boulevard) to Loop 1	Signed as exit 251 southbound
Travis–Williamson county line	Round Rock	250.9	403.8	250	SH 45 Toll to Loop 1 Toll	Southbound exit and northbound entrance
Williamson	Round Rock	250.0	402.3	252B	RM 620 (Round Rock Avenue) / McNeil Road	Access to Round Rock Medical Center
Williamson	Round Rock	252.3	406.0	253	US 79 north (Palm Valley Boulevard) – Hutto, Taylor	
Williamson	Round Rock	253.3	407.6	254	Spur 379 / FM 3406 (Old Settlers Boulevard) – Round Rock	
Williamson	Round Rock	254.5	409.6	256	RM 1431 (University Boulevard) – Cedar Park	Access to Scott & White Healthcare - Round Rock Hospital
Williamson	Round Rock–Georgetown line	255.6	411.3	257	Westinghouse Road	
Williamson	Georgetown	257.2	413.9	259A	Frontage Road	Northbound exit and southbound entrance
Williamson	Georgetown	258.5	416.0	259	Spur 26 (Southeast Inner Loop) / Austin Avenue	Signed as exit 259B northbound; no northbound entrance
Williamson	Georgetown	259.4	417.5	260	RM 2243 – Leander	Access to Georgetown Medical Center
Williamson	Georgetown	260.3	418.9	261	SH 29 – Burnet, Southwestern University	
Williamson	Georgetown	261.2	420.4	262	Williams Drive	
Williamson	Georgetown	263.8	424.5	264	Spur 158 (Austin Avenue) / Lakeway Drive / Northeast Inner Loop	
Williamson	Georgetown	264.5	425.7	265	SH 130 Toll south – San Antonio	SH 130 exit 411
Williamson		264.9	426.3	266	SH 195 north – Killeen, Florence	
Williamson		266.8	429.4	268	FM 972 – Walburg	
Williamson	Jarrell	271.0	436.1	271	Ronald Reagan Boulevard	
Williamson	Jarrell	275.0	442.6	274	County Rd 312	Southbound exit and northbound entrance
Williamson	Jarrell	274.0	441.0	275	FM 487 – Florence, Bartlett	
Williamson	Jarrell	275.8	443.9	277	County Road 305	
Bell		277.3	446.3	279	Hill Road	
Bell		279.2	449.3	280	Grainger Road, Hackberry Road – Prairie Dell	
Bell		280.9	452.1	281	Rest area	Signed as exit 282A southbound
Bell	Salado	280.2	450.9	282	FM 2115	Signed as exit 282B southbound
Bell	Salado	282.8	455.1	283	FM 2268 / FM 2843 – Holland, Salado	
Bell	Salado	283.8	456.7	284	South Main Street / Thomas Arnold Road	Signed as South Main Street northbound and Thomas Arnold Road southbound
Bell	Salado	285.4	459.3	285	Williams Road / Salado Plaza Drive	
Bell	Salado	286.1	460.4	286	FM 2484	
Bell	Belton	287.1	462.0	287	Amity Road	
Bell	Belton	288.0	463.5	289A	Tahuaya Road / Elmer King Road	
Bell	Belton	289.2	465.4	289B	Frontage Road	Northbound exit only
Bell	Belton	290.6	467.7	290	Shanklin Road	
Bell	Belton	290.7	467.8	292	Loop 121	
Bell	Belton	291.8	469.6	293A	I-14 west / US 190 west – Killeen, Fort Hood	I-14 exit 301 eastbound; south end of US 190 overlap.
Bell	Belton	292.9	471.4	293B	SH 317 (Main Street) / FM 436	Northbound exit is via exit 293A
Bell	Belton	293.5	472.3	294A	Spur 253 (Central Avenue)	
Bell	Belton	293.9	473.0	294B	FM 93 (6th Avenue)	
Bell	Temple	296.7	477.5	297	FM 817 (Midway Drive)	
Bell	Temple	297.6	478.9	299	Future I-14 east / US 190 east / Loop 363 / SH 36 – Gatesville, Cameron	North end of US 190 overlap; access to Baylor Scott & White Medical Center - Temple
Bell	Temple	298.7	480.7	300	57th Street, Avenue H	Northbound exit and southbound entrance
Bell	Temple	300.4	483.4	301	SH 53 east (Central Avenue)	One-way street
Bell	Temple	300.4	483.4	301	SH 53 west to FM 2305 (Adams Avenue)	One-way street; access to Draughon-Miller Central Texas Regional Airport
Bell	Temple	301.1	484.6	302	Nugent Avenue	
Bell	Temple	302.2	486.3	303	FM 1143 (Industrial Boulevard) / Spur 290 (3rd Street)	Signed as exit 303 southbound
Bell	Temple	302.9	487.5	303B	Frontage Road	Former exit
Bell	Temple	303.5	488.4	304	Loop 363 (H. K. Dodgen Loop)	
Bell	Temple	304.9	490.7	305	Berger Road	
Bell	Troy	306.6	493.4	306	FM 1237 / Loves Boulevard – Pendleton	
Bell	Troy	308.7	496.8	308	FM 935 (Main Street) / Loves Boulevard	
Bell		311.0	500.5	311	Big Elm Road	
Falls		314.3	505.8	314	Old Blevins Road	
McLennan	Bruceville-Eddy	315.5	507.7	315	SH 7 / FM 107 – Marlin, Moody	
McLennan	Bruceville-Eddy	317.5	511.0	318A	Frontage Road	
McLennan	Bruceville-Eddy	318.1	511.9	318B	Bruceville	Former southbound exit and northbound entrance
McLennan		317.9	511.6	319	Woodlawn Road	
McLennan		319.4	514.0	321	Callan Ranch Road	Northbound exit and entrance
McLennan	Lorena	321.0	516.6	322	FM 2837 east (Rosenthal Parkway / Bordon Street)	
McLennan	Lorena	322.5	519.0	323	FM 2837 west (Old Lorena Road / Old Temple Road)	No southbound entrance
McLennan	Hewitt	324.1	521.6	325	FM 1695 (Hewitt Drive) / FM 3148 (Moonlight Drive)	
McLennan	Robinson	325.7	524.2	328	FM 2063 / FM 2113 (Spring Valley Road, Sun Valley Boulevard)	
McLennan	Robinson	328.0	527.9	329	Frontage Road	Northbound exit
McLennan	Robinson	330.2	531.4	330A	Corporation Boulevard	Southbound exit only
McLennan	Robinson	330.1	531.2	330B	SH 6 / Loop 340 – Meridian, Marlin	Signed as exits 330A (south) and 330B (north) northbound; access to Hillcrest Baptist Medical Center and Providence Medical Center
McLennan	Waco	330.9	532.5	331	New Road	
McLennan	Waco	332.6	535.3	333A	Loop 396 (Valley Mills Drive) / Bus. US 77 / La Salle Avenue – Beverly Hills	
McLennan	Waco	333.0	535.9	333B	24th–19th streets	Northbound exit and southbound entrance
McLennan	Waco	333.7	537.0	334A	US 77 south (18th–17th streets)	South end of US 77 overlap; signed as exit 334 southbound
McLennan	Waco	334.6	538.5	334B	8th Street	Northbound exit only
McLennan	Waco	334.8	538.8	335A	5th–4th streets – Downtown Waco	
McLennan	Waco	335.0	539.1	335B	FM 434 (University Parks Drive) – Baylor University	
McLennan	Waco	335.4	539.8	335C	Spur 576 (Martin Luther King Jr. Boulevard) – McLane Stadium	
McLennan	Waco	336.2	541.1	336	Forrest Street	Northbound exit and southbound entrance
McLennan	Waco	336.6– 336.8	541.7– 542.0	337	Bus. US 77 / Elm Avenue	
McLennan	Waco	337.2	542.7	338A	US 84 (Waco Drive / Bellmead Drive)	
McLennan	Bellmead	338.1	544.1	338B	Behrens Circle	
McLennan	Bellmead	338.5	544.8	339	Loop 340 / FM 3051 (Lake Shore Drive) – Lake Waco	
McLennan	Lacy-Lakeview	339.8	546.9	340	Meyers Lane	Southbound exit is via exit 341
McLennan	Lacy-Lakeview	339.9	547.0	341	Craven Avenue	
McLennan	Lacy-Lakeview	341.0	548.8	342A	FM 2417 (Crest Drive)	
McLennan	Lacy-Lakeview	341.6	549.8	342B	Bus. US 77 south (New Dallas Highway)	
McLennan	Elm Mott	342.6	551.4	343	FM 308 (Elm Mott Drive / Leroy Parkway)	
McLennan	Elm Mott	344.0	553.6	345	Hilltop Lane	
McLennan	Ross	345.6	556.2	346	Ross Road / Tours Road	
McLennan	Ross	348.1	560.2	349	Wiggins Road	
McLennan	West	350.4	563.9	351	FM 1858 / Tokio Road	
McLennan	West	352.1	566.7	353	FM 2114 (T.M. West Parkway) – West	
McLennan		353.1	568.3	354	Marable Street	
McLennan–Hill county line		354.2	570.0	355	County Line Road	
Hill		355.6	572.3	356	County Road 3102	
Hill	Abbott	357.9	576.0	358	FM 1242 – Abbott	
Hill	Abbott	358.9	577.6	359	FM 1304	
Hill		360.2	579.7	362	County Road 3111	
Hill	Hillsboro	363.0	584.2	364A	FM 310 – Lake Aquilla	
Hill	Hillsboro	364.5	586.6	364B	SH 81 north – Hillsboro	Northbound exit and southbound entrance
Hill	Hillsboro	364.7	586.9	364B	County Road 3102	Southbound exit and northbound entrance
Hill	Hillsboro	367.0	590.6	367	FM 3267 (Old Bynum Road)	Northbound exit and southbound entrance
Hill	Hillsboro	367.7	591.8	368A	SH 22 / SH 171 – Whitney, Meridian, Corsicana	No southbound entrance
Hill	Hillsboro	368.6	593.2	368B	FM 286 (Old Brandon Road)	Northbound exit is via exit 368A
Hill	Hillsboro	370.1	595.6	370	US 77 north / Spur 579 – Hillsboro	No southbound exit; north end of US 77 overlap
Hill		371.1	597.2	370B	I-35W north / I-35E north – Fort Worth, Dallas	I-35 north splits into I-35E and I-35W
Gap in route; see Interstate 35W (Texas) and Interstate 35E (Texas)
Denton	Denton	467.8	752.9	467	I-35E south / I-35W south – Dallas, Fort Worth	I-35 south splits into I-35E and I-35W; exit number is for I-35W
Denton	Denton	468.3	753.7	468	FM 1515 (Airport Road) / West Oak Street	Southbound exit and northbound entrance, access to Texas Health Presbyterian Hospital Denton
Denton	Denton	468.8	754.5	469	US 380 (University Drive) – McKinney, Decatur	
Denton	Denton	469.9	756.2	470	Loop 288 east	Southbound exit is via exit 471
Denton	Denton	471.0	758.0	471	US 77 south / FM 1173 – Denton, Krum	South end of US 77 overlap
Denton	Denton	472.4	760.3	472	Ganzer Road	
Denton	Denton	473.5	762.0	473	FM 3163 (Milam Road)	
Denton	Denton	473.9	762.7	474	Cowling Road	Northbound exit and southbound entrance
Denton	Denton	475.0	764.4	475A	FM 156 – Krum	Southbound exit and northbound entrance
Denton	Denton	475.2	764.8	475B	Rector Road	
Denton	Sanger	477.0	767.7	477	I-35 BL north / Keaton Road	
Denton	Sanger	478.0	769.3	478	FM 455 – Pilot Point, Bolivar	
Denton	Sanger	478.8	770.6	479	Belz Road	
Denton	Sanger	480.1	772.6	480	Lois Road	
Denton	Sanger	481.0	774.1	481	View Road	
Denton	Sanger	481.7	775.2	482	Chisam Road	
Cooke	Valley View	483.2	777.6	483	FM 3002 (Lone Oak Road)	
Cooke	Valley View	485.7	781.7	485	Frontage Road	Southbound exit and northbound entrance
Cooke	Valley View	486.1	782.3	486	FM 1307 / Frontage Road	
Cooke	Valley View	486.7	783.3	487	FM 922 – Valley View	No southbound entrance
Cooke	Valley View	488.7	786.5	488	FM 1307 / Hockley Creek Road	Signed as exit 489 southbound
Cooke	Valley View	490.6	789.5	491	Spring Creek Road	
Cooke	Gainesville	493.8	794.7	494	FM 1306	
Cooke	Gainesville	495.7	797.8	495	Frontage Road	Southbound exit and northbound entrance
Cooke	Gainesville	496.0	798.2	496A	Weaver Street	Northbound exit only
Cooke	Gainesville	496.6	799.2	496B	FM 51 (California Street)	Signed as 497 southbound
Cooke	Gainesville	497.7	801.0	498	US 82 – Sherman, Wichita Falls	
Cooke	Gainesville	498.9	802.9	498B	Livestock–Poultry–Exotics Inspection Station	Southbound exit and entrance
Cooke	Gainesville	498.1	801.6	499	Frontage Road	Northbound exit and entrance
Cooke	Gainesville	499.4	803.7	500	FM 372 – Gainesville	
Cooke	Gainesville	500.8	806.0	501	FM 1202 / Prime Outlets Boulevard/Liberty Way	
Cooke	Gainesville	502.1	808.1	502	Texas travel information center, rest area	Southbound exit and entrance
Cooke		503.1	809.7	503	Frontage Road	No southbound exit
Cooke		503.9	810.9	504	Frontage Road	Exits only
Red River		503.895	810.940		I-35 north / US 77 north – Oklahoma City	Continuation into Oklahoma
1.000 mi = 1.609 km; 1.000 km = 0.621 mi: Closed/former; Concurrency terminus; Electronic toll collection; Incomplete access; Route transition

== Auxiliary routes ==
I-35 has two auxiliary routes in Texas:

- I-35W: a branch route of I-35 that runs from a split just north of Hillsboro, passing through Fort Worth before reforming I-35 just west of Denton.
- I-635: a partial loop around the northern and eastern boundaries of Dallas. I-635 intersects with I-35E in north Dallas and does not intersect either I-35W or I-35.

== Notes ==
Interstate 35
Previous state: Terminus	Texas	Next state: Oklahoma
