= Ranch to Market Road 2222 =

State road in Travis County, Texas, United States

Ranch to Market Road 2222

Route information
- Maintained by TxDOT
- Length: 10.844 mi (17.452 km)
- Existed: 1954–present

Major junctions
- Northwest end: RM 620
- Loop 360; Loop 1
- Southeast end: Spur 69 at Lamar Boulevard

Location
- Country: United States
- State: Texas
- Counties: Travis

Highway system
- Highways in Texas; Interstate; US; State; Former; Toll; Loops; Spurs; FM/RM; Park; Rec
← FM 2221	→ FM 2223

Ranch to Market Road 2222 (RM 2222) is a 10.844-mile (17.452 km) ranch to market road in Austin, Texas, United States, that connects Ranch to Market Road 620 (RM 620) with Texas State Highway Spur 69 (Spur 69) and is maintained by the Texas Department of Transportation (TxDOT). Despite RM 2222 ending at Spur 69, the entire length of Spur 69 is signed as RM 2222, rather than Spur 69.

== Route description ==
RM 2222 begins at an intersection with RM 620 in west Austin in the Four Points neighborhood. Northwest of RM 620, the road is called Bullick Hollow Road and continues to the east side of Lake Travis. RM 2222 proceeds southeast from RM 620 for 5.2 miles (8.4 km) to intersect Loop 360. This section of road is a four-lane, lightly developed Texas Hill Country road. It includes Tumbleweed Hill, a half-mile ten-percent gradient hill. City Park Road, leading to the Emma Long Metropolitan Park at Lake Austin, is accessible from RM 2222 just west of Loop 360.

After crossing Loop 360, RM 2222 continues southeast 3.6 miles (5.8 km) to Loop 1 (Mopac Boulevard). This section is a winding, scenic four-lane road built into the cliffs over Lake Austin. As RM 2222 approaches Loop 1, it enters a more heavily developed residential area.

After crossing Loop 1, RM 2222 continues southeast 2.1 miles (3.4 km) to its termination at Spur 69, which leads to U.S. Route 290 and Interstate 35 (I-35). Although the designation after Lamar Boulevard changes to Spur 69, the road is still signed as RM 2222 through to I-35. This section of road is a four-lane, heavily developed urban residential and commercial road.

RM 2222 has several names over its length. Its westernmost segment is merely called RM 2222 (although it is sometimes erroneously referred to as FM 2222 or RR 2222). As it approaches its more developed stretch west of Loop 1 at an intersection with Parkcrest Drive and Highland Crest Drive, RM 2222 picks up the name Northland Drive. After crossing Shoal Creek Boulevard, the name changes to Allandale Road, named for the Allandale neighborhood through which it passes. Finally, after passing Burnet Road, the name changes to Koenig Lane (pronounced KAY-nig), and remains so to the junction with I-35.

The segment of RM 2222 west of Loop 1 is designated a scenic roadway by the City of Austin.

== History ==
RM 2222 originally terminated at the (then) Austin city limits when it was designated on September 29, 1954; it was expanded to its current termination point at Lamar Boulevard on July 16, 1957.

In the late 1980s, the city of Austin developed plans to expand RM 2222 east of Loop 1 into an east–west freeway, SH 169, connecting with US 290. The plans were rejected in the 1990s, citing adverse effects on the environment and existing neighborhoods.

On June 27, 1995, the entire route was redesignated Urban Road 2222 (UR 2222). The designation reverted to RM 2222 with the elimination of the Urban Road system on November 15, 2018.

== Major intersections ==
The entire route is in Austin, Travis County.

mi	km	Destinations	Notes
0.0	0.0	Bullick Hollow Road west – RM 2769	Continuation west from western terminus
0.0	0.0	RM 620 – Round Rock, Mansfield Dam, Lakeway	Western terminus; quadrant roadway intersection
5.2	8.4	Loop 360 (Capital of Texas Highway)	Diamond interchange
8.7	14.0	Loop 1 (Mopac Expressway) / Loop 1 Express	Access to toll lanes is northbound Loop 1 only
10.8	17.4	Lamar Boulevard	Eastern terminus
10.8	17.4	To Spur 69 east (Koenig Lane) / I-35 / US 290	Continuation east of eastern terminus, but still signed as RM 2222
1.000 mi = 1.609 km; 1.000 km = 0.621 mi

== See also ==
- List of Farm to Market Roads in Texas
