= Mustang Ridge, Texas =

- City
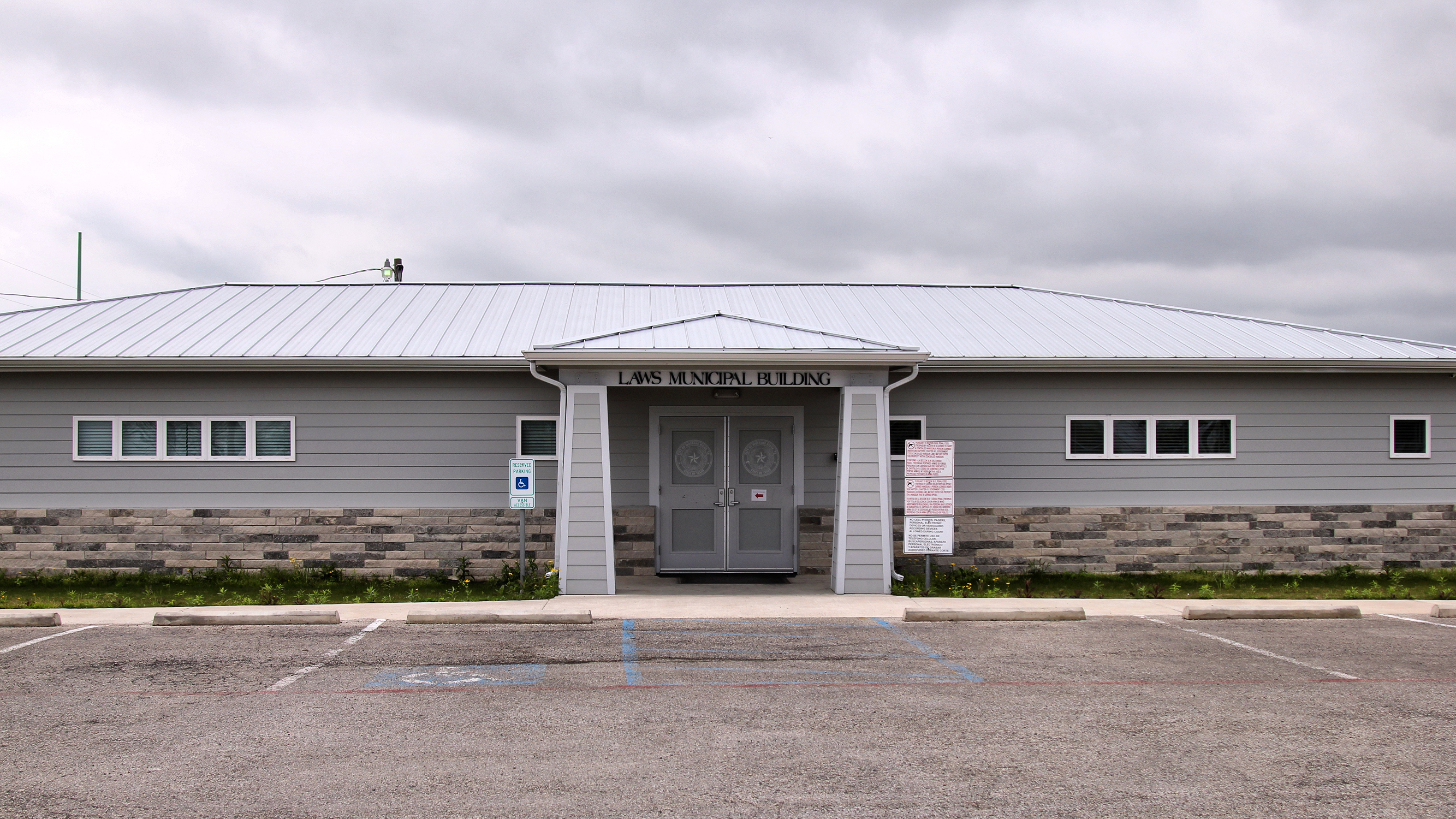
- City Hall

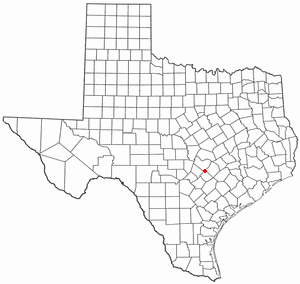
- Location of Mustang Ridge, Texas

- Coordinates: 30°03′28″N 97°39′03″W
- Country: United States
- State: Texas
- Counties: Travis, Caldwell, Bastrop
- Incorporated: 1985

Area
  - Total: 3.73 sq mi (9.66 km^{2})
  - Land: 3.73 sq mi (9.66 km^{2})
  - Water: 0 sq mi (0.00 km^{2})
- Elevation: 568 ft (173 m)

Population (2020)
  - Total: 944
  - Estimate (2025): 1,025
  - Density: 263.1/sq mi (101.57/km^{2})
- Time zone: UTC-6 (Central (CST))
  - Summer (DST): UTC-5 (CDT)
- Zip Code: 78610
- FIPS code: 48-50200
- GNIS feature ID: 2411203
- Website: https://www.mustangridgetx.gov/

Mustang Ridge is a city in Caldwell, Bastrop, and Travis Counties in the U.S. state of Texas.

== Geography ==
According to the United States Census Bureau, the city has a total area of 3.8 square miles (9.8 km^{2}), all land.

== History ==
Mustang Ridge was incorporated into a city by Alton Brooks Laws Jr and Charles Laws in 1985. Alton Brooks Laws was elected the first mayor, municipal judge, and state magistrate. Charles Laws became a source of public controversy when he referred to a proposed detention facility as "a holding pen for wetbacks" on a public agenda.

== Demographics ==
Historical population
Census	Pop.	Note	%±
1990	576		—
2000	785		36.3%
2010	861		9.7%
2020	944		9.6%
2025 (est.)	1,025		8.6%
U.S. Decennial Census

0.0% of residents lived in urban areas, while 100.0% lived in rural areas.

The median age was 36.6 years. 28.0% of residents were under the age of 18 and 12.4% of residents were 65 years of age or older. For every 100 females there were 106.6 males, and for every 100 females age 18 and over there were 101.8 males age 18 and over.

Of all households, 53.0% were married-couple households, 25.3% were households with a male householder and no spouse or partner present, and 15.8% were households with a female householder and no spouse or partner present. About 17.6% of all households were made up of individuals and 5.3% had someone living alone who was 65 years of age or older.

Racial composition as of the 2020 census
Race	Number	Percent
White	371	39.3%
Black or African American	5	0.5%
American Indian and Alaska Native	14	1.5%
Asian	8	0.8%
Native Hawaiian and Other Pacific Islander	2	0.2%
Some other race	311	32.9%
Two or more races	233	24.7%
Hispanic or Latino (of any race)	668	70.8%

=== 2000 census ===
As of the 2000 census, 785 people, 256 households, and 214 families resided in the city. The population density was 206.9 inhabitants per square mile (79.9/km^{2}). The 274 housing units averaged 72.2/sq mi (27.9/km^{2}). The racial makeup of the city was 67.52% White, 4.08% African American, 2.80% Native American, 0.38% Asian, 22.93% from other races, and 2.29% from two or more races. Hispanics or Latinos of any race were 48.41% of the population.

Of the 256 households, 40.6% had children under the age of 18 living with them, 64.8% were married couples living together, 11.3% had a female householder with no husband present, and 16.4% were not families. About 12.9% of all households were made up of individuals, and 4.7% had someone living alone who was 65 years of age or older. The average household size was 3.07 and the average family size was 3.35.

In the city, the population was distributed as 29.3% under the age of 18, 8.7% from 18 to 24, 31.6% from 25 to 44, 21.4% from 45 to 64, and 9.0% who were 65 years of age or older. The median age was 33 years. For every 100 females, there were 106.0 males. For every 100 females age 18 and over, there were 102.6 males.

The median income for a household in the city was $41,771, and for a family was $46,563. Males had a median income of $31,076 versus $23,182 for females. The per capita income for the city was $15,258. About 5.8% of families and 7.9% of the population were below the poverty line, including 8.9% of those under age 18 and 21.5% of those age 65 or over.

== Education ==
The Travis County portion of Mustang Ridge is served by the Del Valle Independent School District. Creedmoor Elementary School serves this portion. For middle school students are divided between Ojeda Middle School and Del Valle Middle School. High school students are zoned to Del Valle High School.

The Caldwell County portion is served by the Lockhart Independent School District.

The Bastrop Independent School District serves the small portion of Mustang Ridge that lies in Bastrop County.

== Law enforcement ==
The Mustang Ridge Police Department serves the incorporated city and actively employees approximately 15 full time officers. When the police force is not working, the city is served by the sheriff's offices of Caldwell and Travis Counties.
