= Farm to Market Road 734 =

Highway in Texas, United States

Farm to Market Road 734
- Parmer Lane

Route information
- Maintained by TxDOT
- Length: 19.284 mi (31.035 km)
- Existed: orig. 1947: curr. 1978–present

Major junctions
- South end: US 290 in Austin
- SH 130 Toll; I-35; Loop 1
- North end: RM 1431 in Cedar Park

Location
- Country: United States
- State: Texas

Highway system
- Highways in Texas; Interstate; US; State; Former; Toll; Loops; Spurs; FM/RM; Park; Rec
← FM 733	→ FM 735

Farm to Market Road 734 (FM 734) is a 19.3-mile (31.1 km) farm-to-market road in Travis and Williamson counties in the U.S. state of Texas. It is the state-maintained portion of Parmer Lane, a major arterial road in the region. Most of the route's length is located just within the northern city limits of Austin, with portions located in Cedar Park, Leander, and unincorporated areas.

== Route description ==
The southern terminus of FM 734 is at US 290, just west of Manor in Travis County. It travels northwest to intersect with Interstate 35 (I-35). It continues to Loop 1 and crosses SH 45 and RM 620 in northwest Austin before reaching its northern terminus at RM 1431 in Cedar Park. The roadway continues beyond RM 1431 as Ronald W. Reagan Boulevard, which travels northward into Leander before curving eastward back to I-35 within the southern city limits of Jarrell.

For most of its length, FM 734 is a six-lane divided roadway. West of Loop 1, the road has wide shoulders and is relatively lightly developed, making it attractive as a bicycling route. However, FM 734 does carry a high traffic load during rush hours, especially at Loop 1 and I-35. FM 734 is primarily a four-lane road between US 290 and Yager Lane, east of I-35.

On June 27, 1995, FM 734 was redesignated Urban Road 734 (UR 734). The designation reverted to FM 734 with the elimination of the Urban Road system on November 15, 2018.

Except for the section between Loop 1 and I-35, Parmer Lane is designated a scenic roadway by the City of Austin.

== History ==
=== Previous route ===
A previous route numbered FM 734 was designated on November 18, 1947, from US 87 at Brady southeast via Voca to the Mason County line. On October 29, 1948, the road was extended southeast to FM 386 at Fredonia. On May 28, 1952, the road was extended southeast to SH 29 northwest of Llano, replacing a section of FM 386 (now RM 386). On May 22, 1958, the route was rerouted out of Voca, shortening the route by 0.1 mile. On April 30, 1959, the western terminus was relocated south of Brady and the former route was transferred to FM 2309. On March 16, 1961, FM 734 was redesignated Ranch to Market 734 (RM 734). RM 734 was cancelled on September 1, 1965, and transferred to SH 71, though signage was not changed until January 1, 1966.

=== Current route ===
Parmer Lane between Loop 275 (Lamar Boulevard) and Loop 1 (Mopac Boulevard) was first designated as FM 734 on April 25, 1978. It was extended north to RM 620 on April 23, 1981. The current termini of FM 734 were set on October 24, 1985, when the northern terminus was moved from RM 620 to RM 1431, and on May 16, 1988, when the southern terminus was moved from Loop 275 to US 290.

In 1997, FM 734 was improved east of I-35 to accommodate a new Samsung Electronics chip fabrication facility. Other major developments along FM 734 include a Freescale Semiconductor office complex built south of RM 620 in 1999, the Round Rock ISD Athletic Complex built between RM 620 and RM 1431 in 2003 and the Tech Ridge shopping center, which opened at I-35 in 2003.

== Parmer vs Palmer ==
Prior to the 1960's Parmer Lane was known as Palmer Lane. It is not known what led to the spelling change.

== Junction list ==
County	Location	mi	km	Destinations	Notes
Travis	Austin	0.0	0.0	US 290 / 290 Toll Road	Interchange; Parmer Lane continues roughly two miles further south
Travis		0.9	1.4	SH 45 Toll / SH 130 Toll (Pickle Parkway)	Interchange; SH 130 exit 436
Travis	Austin	7.5	12.1	I-35	Interchange; I-35 exit 245
Travis	Austin	7.8	12.6	Loop 275 (Lamar Boulevard)	Intersection
Travis	Austin	9.6	15.4	Loop 1 (MoPac Expressway)	Interchange
Williamson	Austin	15.1	24.3	SH 45 Toll / RM 620	Interchange
Williamson	Cedar Park	19.3	31.1	RM 1431 (Whitestone Boulevard)	Continuous-flow intersection; road continues north as Ronald W. Reagan Boulevard
1.000 mi = 1.609 km; 1.000 km = 0.621 mi
