= Texas Capitol View Corridors =

Construction restrictions in Austin, Texas

Preservation of View of State Capitol

Texas Legislature
- Citation: "Preservation of View of State Capitol" (Texas Government Code § 3151.000)
- Enacted by: Texas Senate
- Enacted: March 24, 1983
- Enacted by: Texas House of Representatives
- Enacted: April 21, 1983
- Signed by: Governor Mark White
- Signed: May 3, 1983
- Effective: May 3, 1983

Legislative history

Initiating chamber: Texas Senate
- Bill title: Relating to preservation of the view of the State Capitol from certain points and prohibition of certain construction.
- Bill citation: Tex. S.B. 176, 68th Leg., R.S. (1983).
- Introduced by: Lloyd Doggett
- Introduced: January 17, 1983
- First reading: January 17, 1983
- Second reading: March 24, 1983
- Third reading: March 24, 1983

Revising chamber: Texas House of Representatives
- Bill title: Tex. S.B. 176, 68th Leg., R.S. (1983).
- Received from the Texas Senate: March 28, 1983
- Member(s) in charge: Gerald Hill
- First reading: April 5, 1983
- Second reading: April 21, 1983
- Third reading: April 21, 1983

Amended by
- Tex. H.B. 2812, 77th Leg., R.S. (2001). Tex. H.B. 2256, 83rd Leg., R.S. (2013). Tex. H.B. 3114, 89th Leg., R.S. (2025).
- Status: In force

The Capitol View Corridors are a series of legal restrictions on construction in Austin, Texas, aimed at preserving protected views of the Texas State Capitol from various points around the city. First established by the Texas Legislature in 1983 and recodified in 2001, the corridors are meant to protect the capitol dome from obstruction by high-rise buildings. While supported by cultural and historical preservation organizations, the corridors have also been criticized for limiting the potential for the development of new tall structures in downtown Austin.

== History ==
In 1931, the City of Austin, aiming to preserve the visual preeminence of the 303-foot (92 m) Texas State Capitol, enacted a local ordinance limiting the height of new buildings to a maximum of 200 feet (61 m). From that time until the early 1960s, only the University of Texas Main Building Tower was built higher than the limit, using an exception allowing for additional height with a greater setback. On November 10, 1962, the Austin Statesman announced that real-estate developers were planning a new high-rise residential building adjacent to the Capitol called the Westgate Tower. The proposed design for the tower was 261 feet (80 m) tall, significantly exceeding the city's height limit, although it compensated with a setback for the upper portion.

The prospect of so tall a structure so close to the Capitol met with significant hostility as plans proceeded. In January 1963, Texas Governor Price Daniel voiced his opposition to the proposed tower in his final address to the Texas Legislature. Resistance continued as construction progressed, with State Representative Henry Grover of Houston introducing a bill to condemn the property in February 1965, which was defeated in March in the Texas House of Representatives by only two votes. The Westgate was completed in 1966, but the controversy over the preservation of the Capitol's visual presence that dogged its construction continued to grow.

The Westgate was followed by even taller structures: first the 307-foot (94 m) Dobie Center (designed in 1968), and then a series of ever larger downtown bank towers, culminating in the 395-foot (120 m) One American Center (designed in 1982). In January 1983, inspired by the Westgate and these other structures, State Senator Lloyd Doggett and State Representative Gerald Hill introduced Senate Bill 176, "Relating to preservation of the view of the State Capitol from certain points and prohibition of certain construction." This bill proposed a list of protected "Capitol View Corridors" along which construction would not be permitted, so as to create protected views from a series of points around Austin.

The bill passed through the Texas Senate and House of Representatives in early 1983, ultimately being signed into law on May 3, 1983, and coming into effect immediately. It was later recodified in 2001 by House Bill 2812, which established the current version of the statute in the Texas Government Code Chapter 3151, entitled "Preservation of View of State Capitol". This code defines the thirty state-protected viewing corridors and prohibits any construction that would intersect one of them. In 1985 the City of Austin adopted a corresponding Capitol View Protection Ordinance, so that the majority of the corridors are protected under the Austin Code of Ordinances Chapter 25-2 Appendix A, entitled "Boundaries of the Capitol View Corridors", as well as under state law.

=== Amendments and additions ===
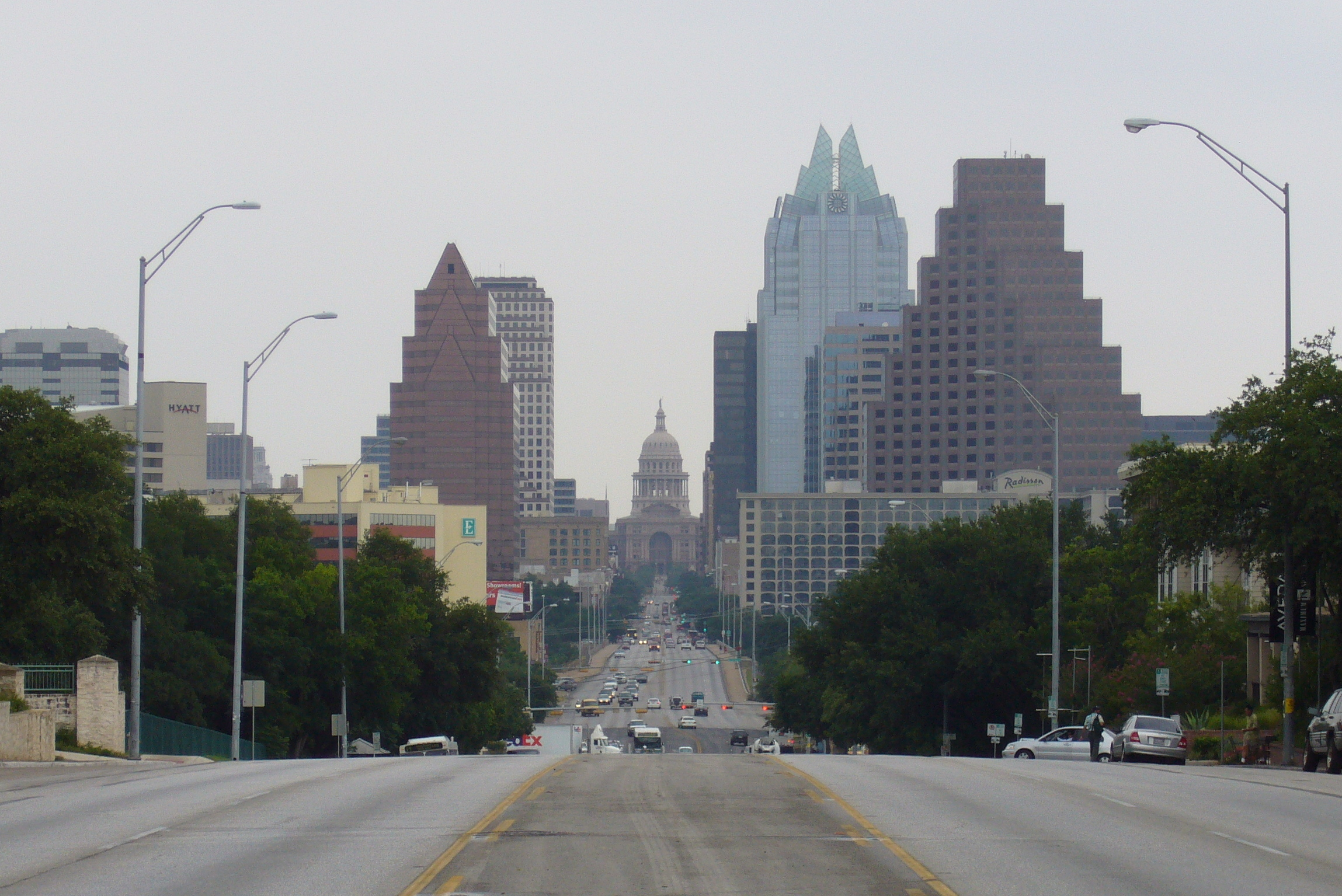
The protected capitol terminating vista along Congress Avenue

The state legislation defining the corridors was amended in 2001 and 2003 to accommodate a series of public development projects, including the redevelopment of the defunct Mueller Airport and an expansion of Darrell K Royal–Texas Memorial Stadium, and again in 2013 to clarify the relationship between the state and city codes. Another revision was enacted in 2025 to accommodate the construction of the forthcoming University of Texas at Austin Medical Center. The amendments reduced the number of corridors from thirty to twenty-six.

In 2007, the Austin City Council asked the Downtown Commission to review the existing corridors and propose updates or modifications. The commission's final report, delivered on June 27, 2007, recommended that eleven of the thirty corridors be reconsidered or modified. Six of the recommended changes were to correct technical errors in the statute or to bring the city and state laws into agreement, and two were to update the laws to reflect portions of the corridors that were already obstructed. The other four recommendations were more controversial, attracting opposition from the city's Parks and Recreation Board, the Heritage Society of Austin, and others; no changes were ultimately made.

In February 2017, the Austin City Council considered a proposal from Council Member Ora Houston to designate additional protected viewing corridors in east Austin. The proposal was provisionally approved by council on February 16, after an amendment removed one of the five proposed new corridors; that corridor was later restored to the proposal on March 2. Due to pushback about economic impacts, potential loss of tax revenue, and severe conflicts with major urban redevelopment plans, the city never enacted the proposed corridors and some of the views were lost to development.

== Impact on development ==
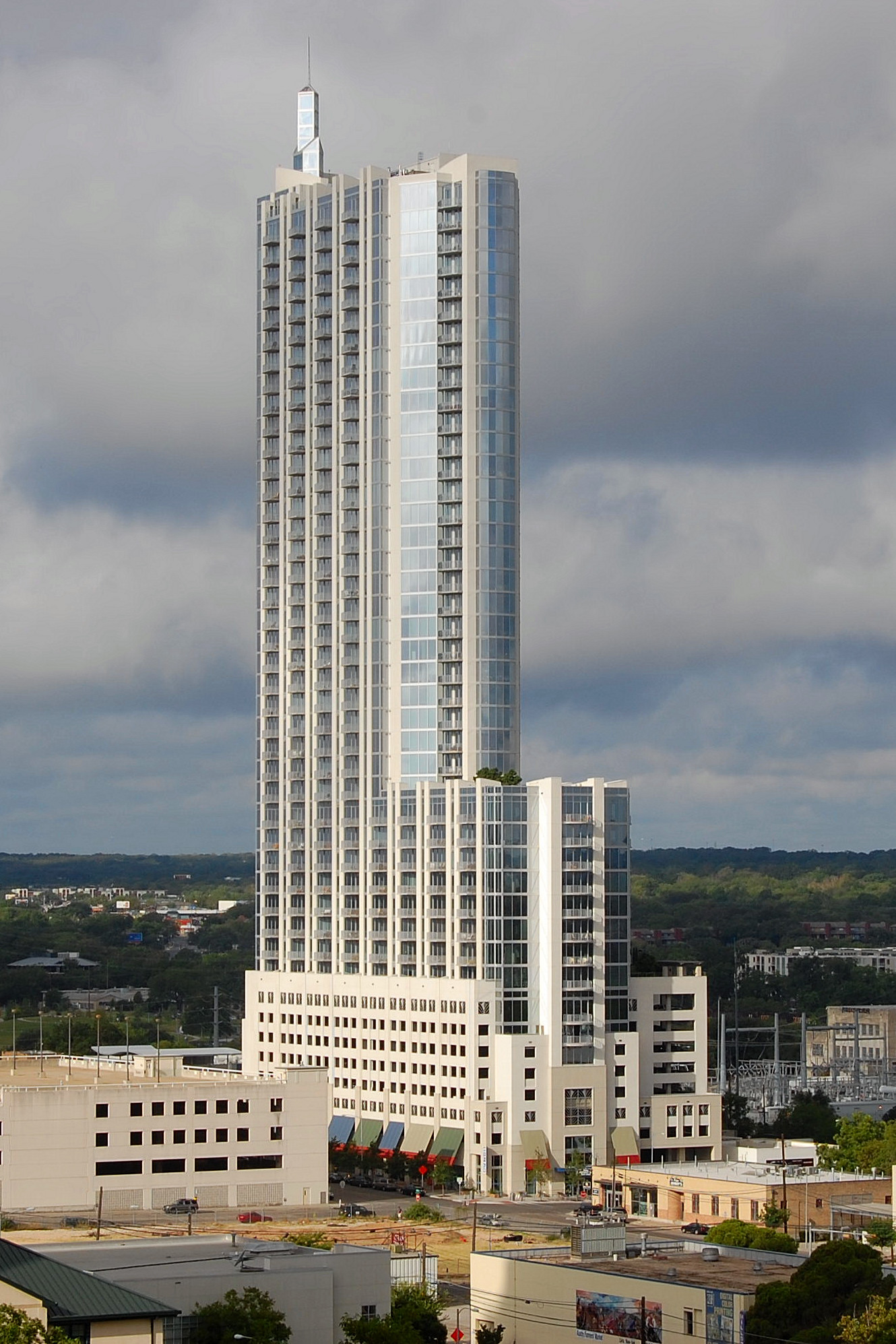
The 360 Condominiums Tower has a setback to avoid obstructing a Capitol View Corridor.

Since their creation, the Capital View Corridors have been a frequent focus of conflict among various groups in Austin and in the Texas government. On one hand, cultural conservation and historical preservation organizations have generally supported the restrictions, arguing that the capitol views form an important part of Austin's cultural heritage and are threatened by the city's growth and land development. On the other hand, both private and public entities looking to build in Austin (especially downtown) have expressed concern about the corridors' impact on investment, on property tax receipts, and on the supply of jobs and housing.

A number of high-rise buildings in central Austin have been designed with diagonal floor plans to avoid obstructing a viewing corridor, such as the Fifth & West Residences Tower; other towers suddenly become narrower when they reach the height of a viewing plane, like the 360 Condominiums Tower. Some major civic development projects have received exemptions from the corridor protections, including the redevelopment of the former Mueller Airport and the expansion of the University of Texas football stadium; in other cases, structures already completed have been condemned and rebuilt because of the corridors, including a newly built water intake facility for the Waller Creek Tunnel. Low-lying corridors prevent essentially all construction on certain blocks downtown.

== Corridors ==
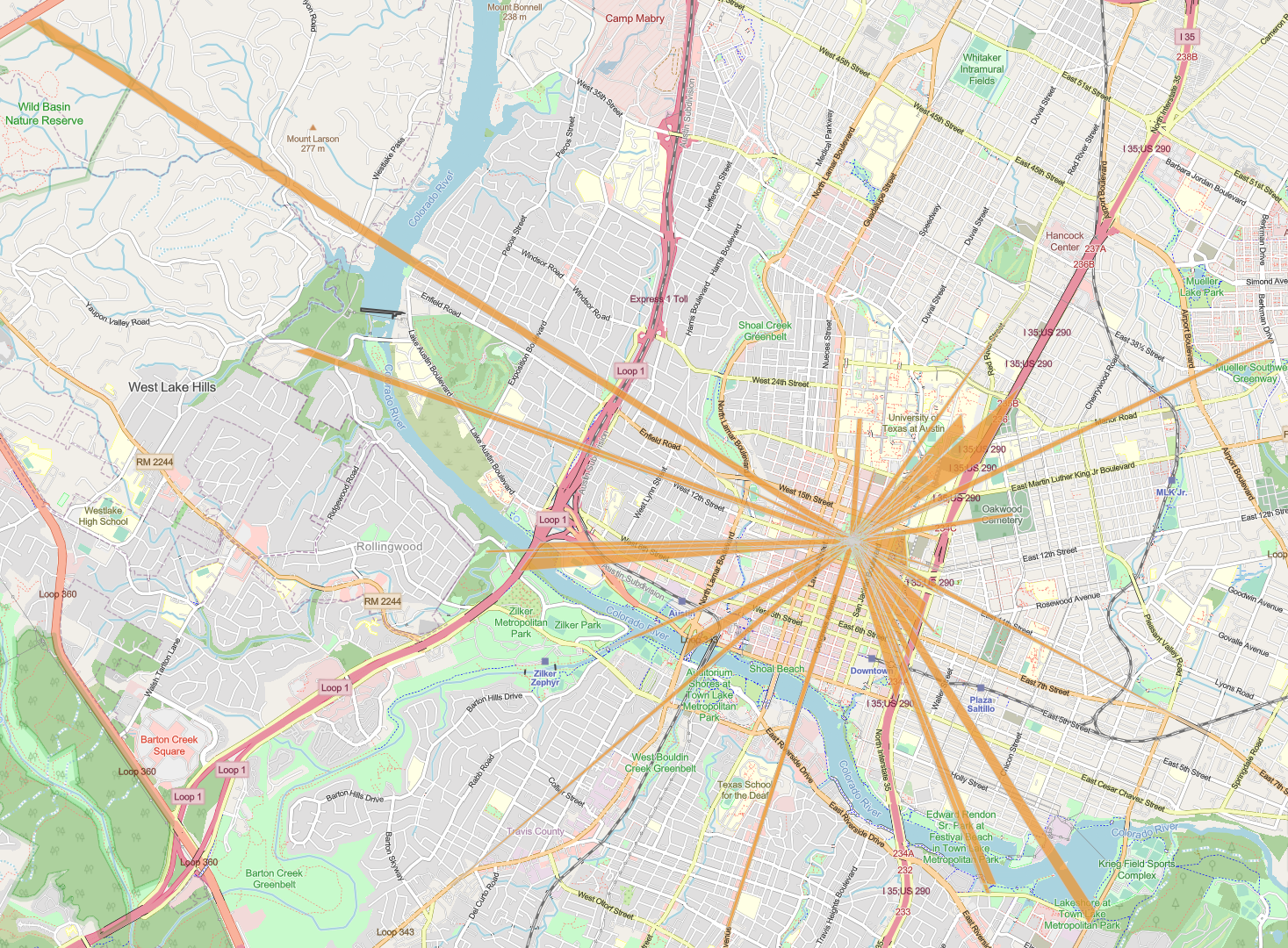
The Capitol View Corridors (in orange) radiate outward from the Capitol dome across Greater Austin.

A Capitol View Corridor is a quadrilateral that links a line segment somewhere in Greater Austin to the base of the capitol dome. No structure is permitted to be built in a manner that would intersect the viewing corridor and thus obstruct the protected view of the Capitol. As of 2025, state law defines thirty Capitol View Corridors in Austin, while municipal code defines twenty-six protected corridors, twenty-one of which are identical to state-defined corridors and five of which differ slightly from five of the state corridors. Many of the corridors protect stationary or pedestrian views, and others protect vehicular views from roadways (some corridors protect both). The corridors have an average length of around 1.5 miles (2.4 km); the shortest runs for 1,700 feet (520 m) to Waterloo Park, and the longest runs 5.7 miles (9.2 km) to a scenic overlook in West Lake Hills.

=== Existing corridors ===
As of 2025, state law defines thirty Capitol View Corridors in Austin, while municipal code defines twenty-six protected corridors, twenty-one of which are identical to state-defined corridors and five of which differ slightly from five of the state corridors.

Number	Name	Viewpoint	Type of view	Length	Image
1	South Mall of The University of Texas	South Mall of the University of Texas campus	Stationary	3,800 feet (1,200 m)	South Mall
2	Waterloo Park	Sidewalk along the east edge of Waterloo Park	Stationary	1,700 feet (520 m)	From Waterloo Park
3	Wooldridge Park	South edge of Wooldridge Park	Stationary	1,900 feet (580 m)	Wooldridge Park
4	French Legation	Front porch of the French Legation	Stationary, Dramatic Glimpse	3,800 feet (1,200 m)	French Legation
5	Lamar Bridge	Lamar Boulevard Bridge over Lady Bird Lake	Threshold	1.2 miles (1.9 km)	Lamar Blvd Bridge
6	South Congress at East Live Oak	Along Congress Avenue to the capitol terminating vista	Sustained Approach	2.4 miles (3.9 km)	South Congress at East Live Oak
7	MoPac Bridge	MoPac Expressway bridge over Lady Bird Lake^{^{[a]}}	Threshold	1.9 miles (3.1 km)	
8	South Lamar at La Casa Drive	Northbound lanes of south Lamar Boulevard	Threshold	3.0 miles (4.8 km)	South Lamar at La Casa
9	Barton Creek Pedestrian Bridge	Barton Creek Bridge on the Ann and Roy Butler Hike-and-Bike Trail in Zilker Park^{^{[b]}}	Dramatic Glimpse	1.6 miles (2.6 km)	
10	Pleasant Valley Road at Lakeshore Drive	East end of Longhorn Shores park on the south shore of Lady Bird Lake	Stationary	2.6 miles (4.2 km)	
11	East 11th Street Threshold	East 11th Street's elevated crossing over Interstate 35	Threshold	3,300 feet (1,000 m)	East 11th Street Threshold
12	Northbound Lanes of Interstate Highway 35 Between the Municipal Police and Courts Building and West 10th Street	A segment of the northbound lanes of I-35 southeast of the capitol^{^{[c]}}	Dramatic Glimpse	3,100 feet (940 m)	
13	Northbound Lanes of Interstate Highway 35 Between Waller Creek Plaza and the Municipal Police and Courts Building	A segment of the northbound lanes of Interstate 35 southeast of the capitol	Dramatic Glimpse	3,900 feet (1,200 m)	
14	Northbound Lanes of Interstate Highway 35 Between 3rd Street and Waller Creek Plaza	A segment of the northbound lanes of Interstate 35 southeast of the capitol	Sustained Approach	4,800 feet (1,500 m)	
15	East 7th Street Bridge over the Texas and New Orleans Railroad	East 7th Street's elevated bridge over the Texas and New Orleans Railroad tracks	Sustained Approach	2.4 miles (3.9 km)	
16	Longhorn Shores	South edge of Longhorn Shores park on the south shore of Lady Bird Lake^{^{[d]}}	Stationary	2.2 miles (3.5 km)	
17	Zilker Clubhouse	Plaza in front of the Zilker Clubhouse in Zilker Park	Stationary	2.1 miles (3.4 km)	
18	Redbud Trail	A hill crest along Redbud Trail in West Lake Hills, Texas^{^{[e]}}	Threshold	3.4 miles (5.5 km)	
19	Enfield Road	Eastbound lanes of Enfield Road	Threshold, Sustained Approach	4,800 feet (1,500 m)	Enfield Road
20	Capital of Texas Highway	A scenic overlook on the east side of Capital of Texas Highway in West Lake Hills, Texas	Stationary, Dramatic Glimpse	5.7 miles (9.2 km)	From 360 overlook
21	38th Street at Red River	Southbound lanes of Red River Street around its intersection with 38th Street^{^{[f]}}	Sustained Approach	1.8 miles (2.9 km)	
22	East 12th Street at Interstate Highway 35	East 12th Street's elevated crossing over I-35	Threshold	3,100 feet (940 m)	East 12th Street at I-35
23	Lyndon Baines Johnson Library	Terrace of the Lyndon Baines Johnson Library and Museum on the University of Texas campus^{^{[f]}^{[h]}}	Stationary	1.0 mile (1.6 km)	
24	North Congress Avenue at Martin Luther King Jr. Boulevard	North Congress Avenue from its intersection with Martin Luther King Jr. Boulevard at the southern edge of the University of Texas campus^{^{[h]}}	Stationary	2,300 feet (700 m)	Congress at MLK Blvd
25	Field Level of the Memorial Stadium Practice Center	Practice field to the south of Darrell K Royal–Texas Memorial Stadium on the University of Texas campus^{^{[h]}}	Stationary	3,600 feet (1,100 m)	
26	Entrance Terrace to the University of Texas Swim Center	Terrace of the Lee and Joe Jamail Texas Swimming Center on the University of Texas campus^{^{[h]}}	Stationary	2,900 feet (880 m)	UT Swim Center

^{[a]} The state and city definitions of this corridor disagree, with the state defining a longer section of the bridge as the protected viewpoint.

^{[b]} The state and city definitions of this corridor disagree, with the state defining a point just downstream from the bridge as the protected viewpoint.

^{[c]} The state and city definitions of this corridor disagree, with the city defining a longer section of the highway as the protected viewpoint.

^{[d]} The state and city definitions of this corridor disagree, with the state defining a wider protected viewpoint, slightly farther north (closer to the lake).

^{[e]} The state and city definitions of this corridor disagree, with the city defining a wider protected viewpoint.

^{[f]} This corridor was partially obstructed by the addition of an upper seating deck to the east side of Darrell K Royal–Texas Memorial Stadium.

^{[g]} Redevelopment of the airport has been exempted from compliance with this viewing corridor.

^{[h]} This corridor is defined only under state law (not under city ordinance).

=== Former corridors ===
Former number	Name	Viewpoint	Type of view	Length	Image
13	Southbound Lanes of the Upper Deck of Interstate Highway 35 Between Concordia College and the Martin Luther King Jr. Boulevard Overpass	A segment of the elevated southbound lanes of I-35 northeast of the capitol	Sustained Approach	1.0 mile (1.6 km)	
23	Robert Mueller Airport	Base of the old air traffic control tower at the former Mueller Airport^{^{[g]}}	Stationary	2.7 miles (4.3 km)	
24	Martin Luther King Jr. Boulevard at IH-35	Westbound lanes of Martin Luther King Jr. Boulevard at its intersection with I-35	Threshold	3,500 feet (1,100 m)	MLK and 35
25	Oakwood Cemetery	Comal Street as it runs through Oakwood Cemetery	Stationary	5,000 feet (1,500 m)	Oakwood Cemetery

=== Additional proposed corridors (never enacted) ===
Number	Name	Viewpoint	Type of view	Length	Image
1	Rosewood Park	Thompson Street across Rosewood Park	Threshold	1.9 miles (3.1 km)	
2	Lott Park	Lott Park; View now obscured by new construction	Stationary	3,500 feet (1,100 m)	
3	Texas State Cemetery Hill	A hillside within the Texas State Cemetery	Stationary	1.1 miles (1.8 km)	
4	Juniper Street	Intersection of Juniper Street and Navasota Street; View now obscured by new construction	Threshold	4,600 feet (1,400 m)	Juniper and Navasota
5	Huston–Tillotson University	Jackson Moody Building on the Huston–Tillotson University campus	Stationary	1.3 miles (2.1 km)	
