= List of crossings of the Colorado River (Texas) =

This is a list of bridges and other crossings of the Colorado River from the Gulf of Mexico upstream to West Texas.

== Crossings ==
Crossing	Carries	Location	Coordinates
Bridge	FM 521	near Wadsworth	28°47′22″N 95°59′47″W
Rail bridge	UP Angleton Subdivision		28°54′13″N 96°01′34″W
Bridge	SH 35	Bay City	28°59′02″N 95°59′59″W
Pipeline bridge			28°59′40″N 96°00′06″W
Pipeline bridge			29°14′29″N 96°06′24″W
Bridge	Richmond Road North	Wharton	29°18′31″N 96°06′13″W
Bridge	Richmond Road South	Wharton	29°18′31″N 96°06′14″W
Rail bridge	CPKC Rosenberg (Macaroni) Line	Wharton	29°18′26″N 96°06′24″W
Bridge	US 59	Wharton	29°18′49″N 96°07′30″W
Pipeline bridge			29°19′53″N 96°11′14″W
Bridge	FM 960	Glen Flora	29°20′10″N 96°11′54″W
Pipeline bridge			29°20′52″N 96°13′11″W
Pipeline bridge			29°22′07″N 96°18′09″W
Bridge	FM 950	Garwood	29°27′11″N 96°23′47″W
Bridge	US 90 Alt.	Altair	29°34′49″N 96°25′03″W
Rail bridge	UP Garwood Spur	Altair	29°34′50″N 96°25′04″W
Pipeline bridge			29°35′05″N 96°25′17″W
Bridge	I-10	Columbus	29°41′46″N 96°31′56″W
Bridge	US 90 (Walnut Street)	Columbus	29°42′23″N 96°32′11″W
Rail bridge	UP Glidden Subdivision	Columbus	29°42′26″N 96°32′09″W
Bridge	Business 71	Columbus	29°42′48″N 96°32′50″W
Bridge	SH 71	Columbus	29°43′10″N 96°34′48″W
Bridge	US 77	La Grange	29°53′47″N 96°52′12″W
Bridge	Business 71	La Grange	29°54′04″N 96°53′13″W
Rail bridge	UP Katy Line	La Grange	29°54′18″N 96°53′23″W
Bridge	SH 71	La Grange	29°54′47″N 96°53′46″W
Rail bridge	UP Giddings Subdivision	West Point	29°59′01″N 97°02′05″W
Bridge	SH 71	Smithville	30°00′59″N 97°08′47″W
Bridge	SH 230	Smithville	30°00′47″N 97°09′43″W
Rail bridge	UP Waco Subdivision	Bastrop	30°04′50″N 97°19′07″W
Bridge	SH 71	Bastrop	30°06′17″N 97°19′10″W
Colorado River Bridge at Bastrop	Pedestrian Walkway	Bastrop	30°06′36″N 97°19′21″W
Chief Petty Officer (SOC) Stephen "Matt" Mills Bridge	Loop 150	Bastrop	30°06′36″N 97°19′22″W
Bridge	FM 969	Bastrop	30°10′04″N 97°24′10″W
Bridge	SH 130 Toll / SH 45 Toll (Pickle Parkway)	Del Valle	
Bridge	FM 973	Del Valle	30°12′29″N 97°38′17″W
Bridge	US 183 north (Frontage Road); Ramp to Loop 111 north (Airport Boulevard)	Austin	30°14′44″N 97°41′25″W
Bridge	183 Toll Road (Bergstrom Expressway) US 183 south (Frontage Road)	Austin	30°14′44″N 97°41′28″W
Montopolis Bridge	Formerly Loop 111 (Airport Boulevard), now bicycle and pedestrian-only	Austin	30°14′43″N 97°41′29″W
Longhorn Dam Bridge	Pleasant Valley Road	Austin	30°15′01″N 97°42′49″W
Bridge (triple span)	I-35 / US 290	Austin	30°15′02″N 97°44′09″W
Ann W. Richards Congress Avenue Bridge	Congress Avenue	Austin	30°15′42″N 97°44′43″W
Drake Bridge	South 1st Street	Austin	30°15′46″N 97°44′52″W
Rail bridge	UPRR Austin Subdivision	Austin	30°15′54″N 97°45′16″W
James D. Pfluger Pedestrian and Bicycle Bridge	Lady Bird Lake Hike and Bike Trail	Austin	30°15′56″N 97°45′21″W
Lamar Boulevard Bridge	Loop 343 (Lamar Boulevard)	Austin	30°15′57″N 97°45′24″W
Bridge	Loop 1 (MoPac)	Austin	30°16′26″N 97°46′18″W
Roberta Crenshaw Pedestrian Walkway	Lady Bird Lake Hike and Bike Trail	Austin	30°16′26″N 97°46′18″W
Bridge	Redbud Trail	Austin	30°17′30″N 97°47′10″W
Pennybacker Bridge	Loop 360 (Capital of Texas Highway)	Austin	30°20′59″N 97°47′49″W
Bridge	Low Water Crossing Road	Austin	30°23′17″N 97°54′47″W
Bridge	RM 620	Austin	30°23′27″N 97°54′35″W
Mansfield Dam	Mansfield Dam Road	Austin	30°23′30″N 97°54′25″W
Bridge	US 281	Marble Falls	30°34′2″N 98°16′31″W
Rail bridge	AWRR West Subdivision	Kingsland	30°39′26″N 98°25′43″W
Bridge	RM 1431	Kingsland	30°39′29″N 98°25′45″W
Pedestrian bridge		Buchanan Dam	30°44′54″N 98°23′52″W
State Highway 29 Bridge at the Colorado River	SH 29	Buchanan Dam	30°44′55″N 98°23′53″W
Bridge	FM 580	Bend	31°6′2″N 98°30′54″W
Bridge	US 190		31°13′6″N 98°33′52″W
Rail bridge	CTXR		31°14′7″N 98°33′46″W
Ford (locally called "Double Ford")	CR 124		31°17′50″N 98°35′52″W
Bridge	SH 16		31°21′11″N 98°40′18″W
Regency Bridge	CR 433 (Mills), CR 137 (San Saba)		31°24′38″N 98°50′47″W
Bridge	FM 45		31°27′31″N 98°56′34″W
Ford (locally called "Elm Grove Ford")	CR 266		31°28′47″N 99°01′38″W
Bridge	US 377	Winchell	31°28′5″N 99°9′40″W
Pedestrian bridge		Winchell	31°28′4″N 99°9′43.5″W
Bridge	US 283		31°26′22″N 99°22′30″W
Bridge	Waldred Road		31°27′48″N 99°25′19″W
Bridge	FM 503		31°29′37″N 99°34′27″W
Bridge	FM 1929		31°29′54″N 99°39′42″W
Bridge	CR 129		31°38′11″N 99°49′56″W
Bridge	US 83	Ballinger	31°43′48″N 99°56′30″W
Bridge	US 67	Ballinger	31°43′58″N 99°57′26″W
Rail bridge	BNSF Railway	Ballinger	31°43′57″N 99°57′16″W
