= South First Street Bridge =

Bridge in Austin, Texas, U.S.

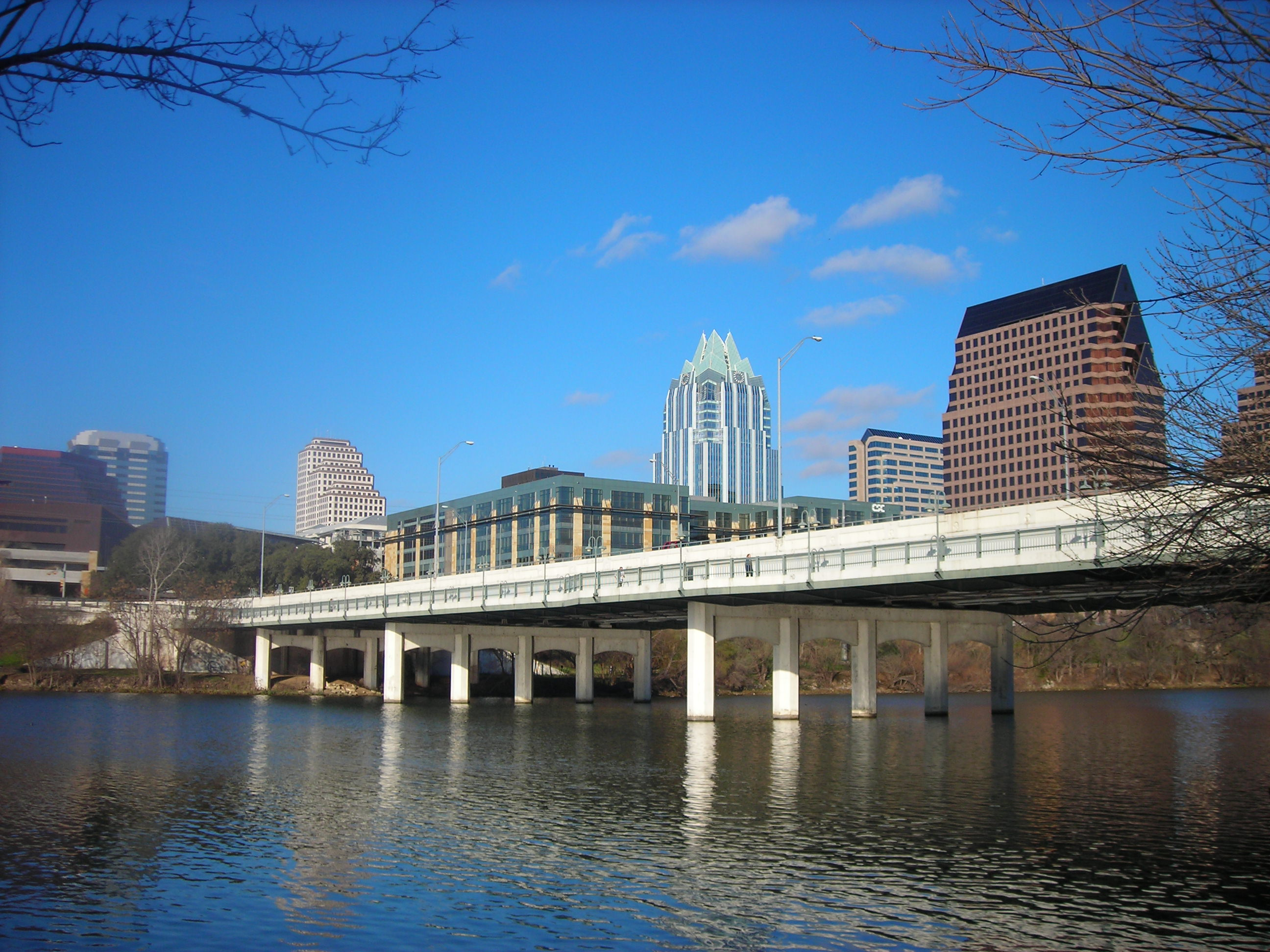
- Coordinates: 30.2628°N 97.748°W
- Locale: Austin, Texas, United States

Location
- Interactive map of South First Street Bridge

The Drake Bridge, also known as the South First Street Bridge or simply as the First Street Bridge is a bridge in Austin, Texas, United States. It is named after Austin mayor William Sherman Drake, Jr., who held office at the time of the bridge's completion in 1954.

== See also ==
- List of crossings of the Colorado River
