= Wild Basin Wilderness Preserve =

Nature preserve near Austin, Texas

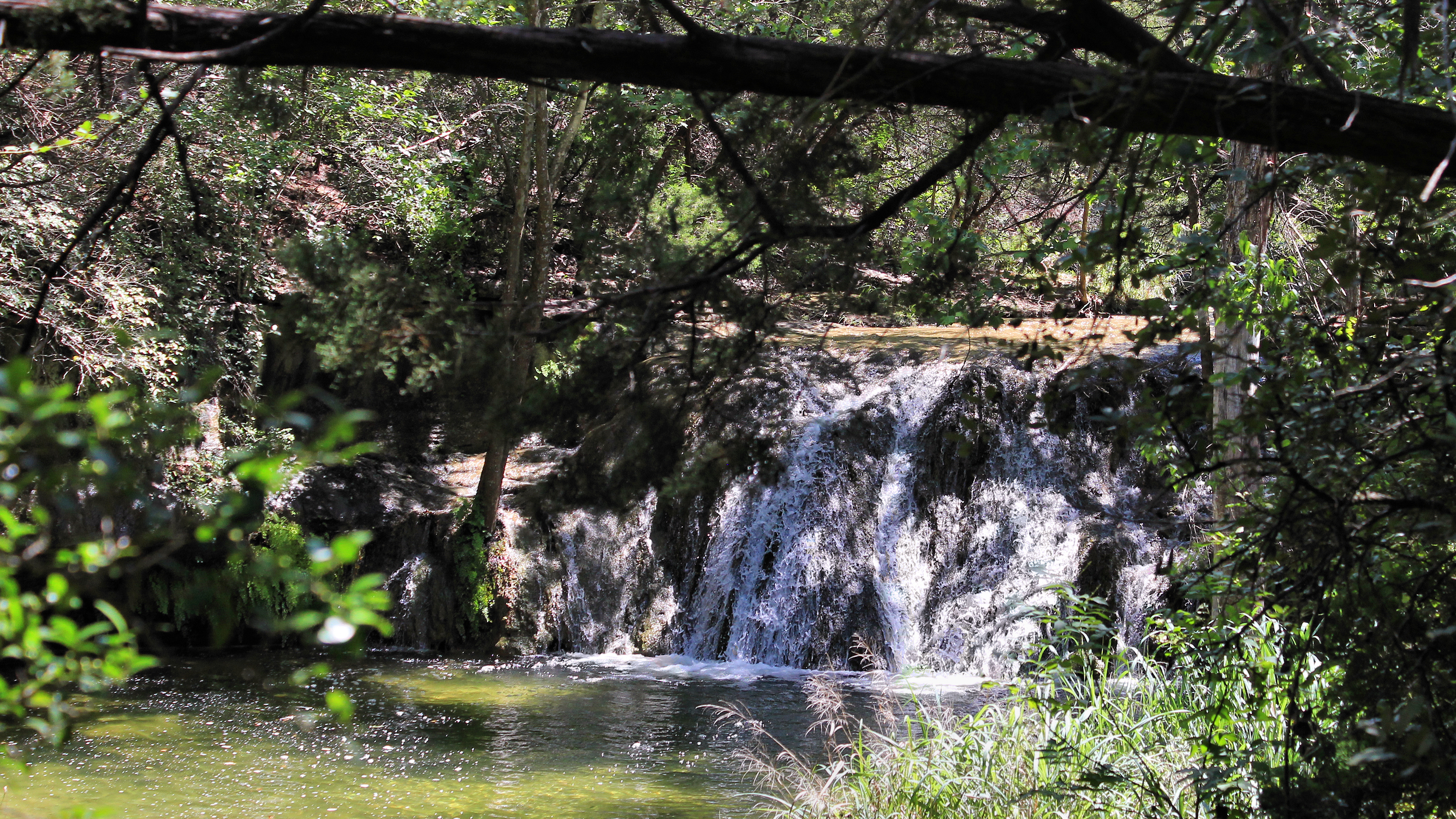
- A waterfall in Wild Basin Wilderness Preserve
- Location: Travis County, Texas, USA
- Nearest city: Austin, Texas
- Coordinates: 30°18′37″N 97°49′24″W
- Established: 1974
- Governing body: Travis County Parks, St. Edward's University

Wild Basin Wilderness Preserve consists of 227 acres (919,000 m^{2}) of native Texas Hill Country habitat west of Austin, Texas in West Lake Hills. The preserve was founded in 1974 by seven women who were members of an environmentalist group called Now or Never, and it was Austin's first nature preserve. The preserve maintains 2.5 miles (4 km) of hiking trails, and is owned and operated jointly by Travis County and St. Edward's University.

== Location ==
The entrance to the preserve is a mile north of Bee Caves Road along the east side of Loop 360. The hiking trails are open every day sunrise to sunset, usually this is in between the hours of 7 am-7 pm. The Wild Basin Creative Research Visitor Center is open M-F, 9 am-4 pm.

Bikes, pets, smoking and picnics are all prohibited within the preserve boundaries.

The preserve serves as a gateway to the larger Balcones Canyonlands Preserve.

== History ==
In 1974 Janet Poage, a West Lake Hills resident and prominent environmentalist, was instrumental in negotiating a developments rights agreement between the City of Austin, Travis County, and Westview Development creating the preserve. Other founders include Margaret Hessin, Lucille Stegman, Flora (Esther) McCormick, Florence Macklin, Martha Hudson, and Willa Mae Hardesty.

Mrs. Poage along with Westview executive Beth Robertson, Mayor Carol McClellan and County Commissioner Ann Richards redrew the master plan of Westview's 1,300-acre Davenport Ranch residential development in order to set aside over 100 acres of the developer's land to protect the sensitive Hill Country environment including habitat for the black-capped vireo and endangered golden-cheeked warbler.

In the deal, Westview donated the land to Wild Basin and, in return, the City gave the developer the right to relocate 100 residential units originally planned on the preserve land to its adjacent property. This transaction was one of the first transfers of development rights in the Austin area and created one of the more important environmental laboratories on the Edwards Plateau.

== Nature ==
=== Animals ===
Wild basin protects critical habitat for the endangered golden-cheeked warbler and several other rare and vulnerable species. Other animal species seen include white-tailed deer, greater roadrunner, eastern screech-owl, North American porcupine, bobcat, coyote, gray fox, Gulf Coast toad, and Blanchard's cricket frog.

== Plants ==
Ashe juniper, yaupon holly Buckley's oak and Texas live oak are the predominant trees in the park.
