= Ranch to Market Road 2244 =

Road in Texas, United States

Ranch to Market Road 2244
- Bee Cave(s) Road

Route information
- Maintained by TxDOT
- Length: 11.257 mi (18.116 km)
- Existed: 1954–present

Major junctions
- West end: SH 71 in Bee Cave, Texas
- Loop 360
- East end: Loop 1 in Austin, Texas

Location
- Country: United States
- State: Texas

Highway system
- Highways in Texas; Interstate; US; State; Former; Toll; Loops; Spurs; FM/RM; Park; Rec
| ← RM 2243 | → FM 2245 |

Ranch to Market Road 2244 (RM 2244) is an 11.3-mile (18.2 km) ranch-to-market road in Travis County, Texas, United States. It is known locally as Bee Cave Road or Bee Caves Road.

== Route description ==
RM 2244 starts at an intersection with SH 71 in the south part of Bee Cave. It proceeds east for 7.6 miles (12.2 km) as a four-lane divided roadway to intersect Loop 360. After leaving Bee Cave, the road is relatively lightly developed, although it passes by the community of Lost Creek. After passing Loop 360, RM 2244 continues southeast for 3.8 miles (6.1 km) to its terminus at Loop 1 (Mopac Boulevard), just southwest of downtown Austin. In this segment, RM 2244 passes through the suburban cities of West Lake Hills and Rollingwood.

Whether the name of the road is the singular "Bee Cave" or the plural "Bee Caves" has long been a source of confusion and debate, as road signage varies. This confusion is not recent: the post office for the town of Bee Cave opened under the name "Bee Caves" in 1870.

RM 2244 is designated a scenic roadway by the City of Austin.

== History ==
Travis County residents requested the addition of Bee Cave Road to the farm-to-market system in 1953, citing increased traffic and dangers due to the roadway's alignment. Despite previous opposition from county officials, RM 2244 was designated on September 29, 1954, from RM 93 (now SH 71) southeast to the west Austin city limits. On July 16, 1957, RM 2244 was extended southeast to US 290 (now Loop 343). On September 6, 1975, the section from Loop 1 to Loop 343 (now Barton Springs Road) was removed from the state highway system, while another section was transferred to Loop 1.

On June 27, 1995, the designation of RM 2244 was changed to Urban Road 2244 (UR 2244). The designation reverted to RM 2244 on November 15, 2018, with the elimination of the Urban Road system.

== Junction list ==
The entire route is in Travis County.

| Location | mi | km | Destinations | Notes |
|---|---|---|---|---|
| Bee Cave | 0.0 | 0.0 | SH 71 | Western terminus |
| Austin–West Lake Hills line | 7.6 | 12.2 | Loop 360 (Capital of Texas Highway) | |
| Austin | 11.3 | 18.2 | Loop 1 (Mopac Expressway) | Eastern terminus; road continues as Wallingwood Drive |
1.000 mi = 1.609 km; 1.000 km = 0.621 mi
