= Lost Creek, Texas =

- CDP
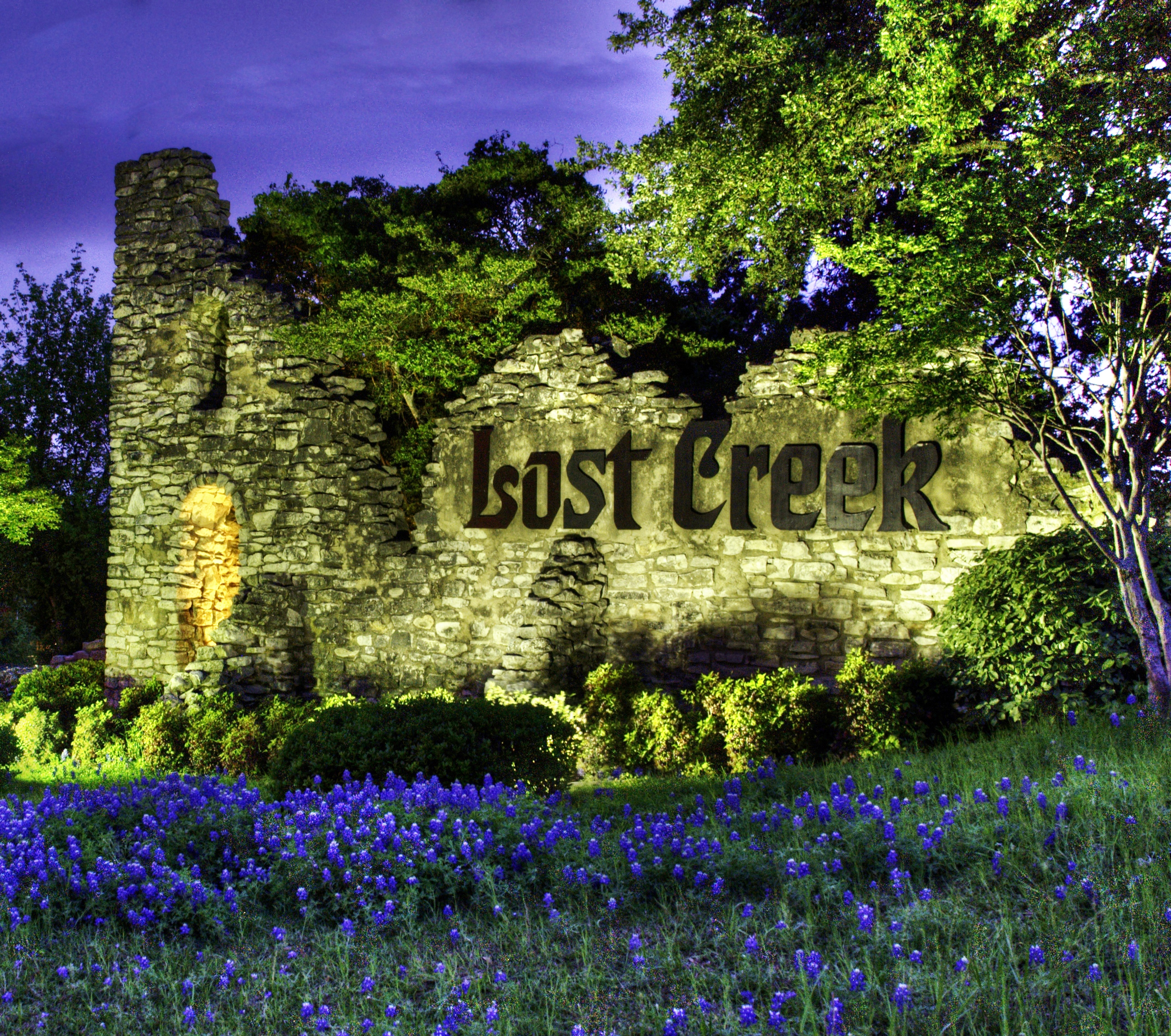
- Lost Creek entrance monument on Lost Creek Blvd at Capital of Texas Highway.
- Coordinates: 30°17′40″N 97°50′44″W
- Country: United States
- State: Texas
- County: Travis

Area
  - Total: 3.3 sq mi (8.5 km^{2})
  - Land: 3.3 sq mi (8.5 km^{2})
  - Water: 0 sq mi (0.0 km^{2})
- Elevation: 823 ft (251 m)

Population (2020)
  - Total: 1,276
  - Density: 390/sq mi (150/km^{2})
- Time zone: UTC-6 (Central (CST))
  - Summer (DST): UTC-5 (CDT)
- Zip Code: 78746
- FIPS code: 48-44166
- GNIS feature ID: 1867554

Lost Creek is an affluent upper-middle-class neighborhood and census-designated place (CDP) in Travis County, Texas, United States. The population was 1,276 at the 2020 census. The census tract is bordered by Capital of Texas Highway to the east, Barton Creek to the south, Barton Creek Boulevard to the west, and Bee Caves Road to the north. The Lost Creek CDP encompasses several small neighborhoods—Parkstone, Woods of Westlake, Camelot, and Knollwood—as well as the largest and most populous Lost Creek neighborhood.

The neighborhood is named after a secluded section of Barton Creek away from more popular portions downstream that include Barton Springs and Zilker Park.

Suburban residential development began in the late 1970s and continued for over three decades. Lost Creek is almost completely built-out. Lost Creek also encompasses a commercial area bordering Bee Caves Road and Capital of Texas Highway. Businesses occupying these buildings include Capital One Bank, Wells Fargo Bank, and Apple Inc. Lost Creek was annexed by the City of Austin in December 2015 and was dis-annexed in May 2024 under the provisions of HB 3053 passed during the 88th Texas Legislature

== Geography ==
Lost Creek has a total area of 3.3 square miles (8.5 km^{2}), all land.

== Schools ==
Lost Creek lies completely within the Eanes Independent School District. Students residing within Lost Creek attend Forest Trail Elementary, West Ridge Middle School, and Westlake High School.

== Demographics ==
Historical population
Census	Pop.	Note	%±
1990	4,095		—
2000	4,729		15.5%
2010	4,509		−4.7%
2020	1,276		−71.7%
U.S. Decennial Census; 1850–1900 1910; 1920 1930 1940; 1950 1960 1970; 1980 1990 2000; 2010 2020

Lost Creek first appeared as a census designated place in the 1990 U.S. census.

=== 2020 census ===
Lost Creek CDP, Texas – Racial and ethnic composition Note: the US Census treats Hispanic/Latino as an ethnic category. This table excludes Latinos from the racial categories and assigns them to a separate category. Hispanics/Latinos may be of any race.
Race / Ethnicity (NH = Non-Hispanic)	Pop 2000	Pop 2010	Pop 2020	% 2000	% 2010	% 2020
White alone (NH)	4,218	3,770	957	89.19%	83.61%	75.00%
Black or African American alone (NH)	23	20	16	0.49%	0.44%	1.25%
Native American or Alaska Native alone (NH)	9	17	3	0.19%	0.38%	0.24%
Asian alone (NH)	230	339	105	4.86%	7.52%	8.23%
Native Hawaiian or Pacific Islander alone (NH)	0	0	0	0.00%	0.00%	0.00%
Other race alone (NH)	5	7	4	0.11%	0.16%	0.31%
Mixed race or Multiracial (NH)	70	78	77	1.48%	1.73%	6.03%
Hispanic or Latino (any race)	174	278	114	3.68%	6.17%	8.93%
Total	4,729	4,509	1,276	100.00%	100.00%	100.00%

=== 2000 census ===
As of the census of 2000, there were 4,729 people, 1,562 households, and 1,379 families residing in the CDP. The population density was 1,509.6 inhabitants per square mile (582.9/km^{2}). There were 1,584 housing units at an average density of 505.7 per square mile (195.3/km^{2}). The racial makeup of the CDP was 92.20% White, 0.51% African American, 0.27% Native American, 4.88% Asian, 0.57% from other races, and 1.56% from two or more races. Hispanic or Latino of any race were 3.68% of the population.

There were 1,562 households, out of which 52.0% had children under the age of 18 living with them, 80.2% were married couples living together, 6.2% had a female householder with no husband present, and 11.7% were non-families. 9.5% of all households were made up of individuals, and 2.4% had someone living alone who was 65 years of age or older. The average household size was 3.03 and the average family size was 3.24.

In the CDP, the population was spread out, with 32.5% under the age of 18, 4.8% from 18 to 24, 22.9% from 25 to 44, 33.9% from 45 to 64, and 5.9% who were 65 years of age or older. The median age was 40 years. For every 100 females, there were 102.2 males. For every 100 females age 18 and over, there were 94.9 males.

The median income for a household in the CDP was $116,500, and the median income for a family was $121,069. Males had a median income of $94,013 versus $45,804 for females. The per capita income for the CDP was $52,147. None of the families and 1.2% of the population were living below the poverty line, including no under eighteens and none of those over 64.

Adult residents of Lost Creek are extremely well educated. In 2014, Business Insider declared Lost Creek to be The Most Educated Place In Texas and seventh most educated place in the United States. based on its analysis of census data.
