= Lamar Boulevard Bridge =

Historic bridge in Austin, Texas

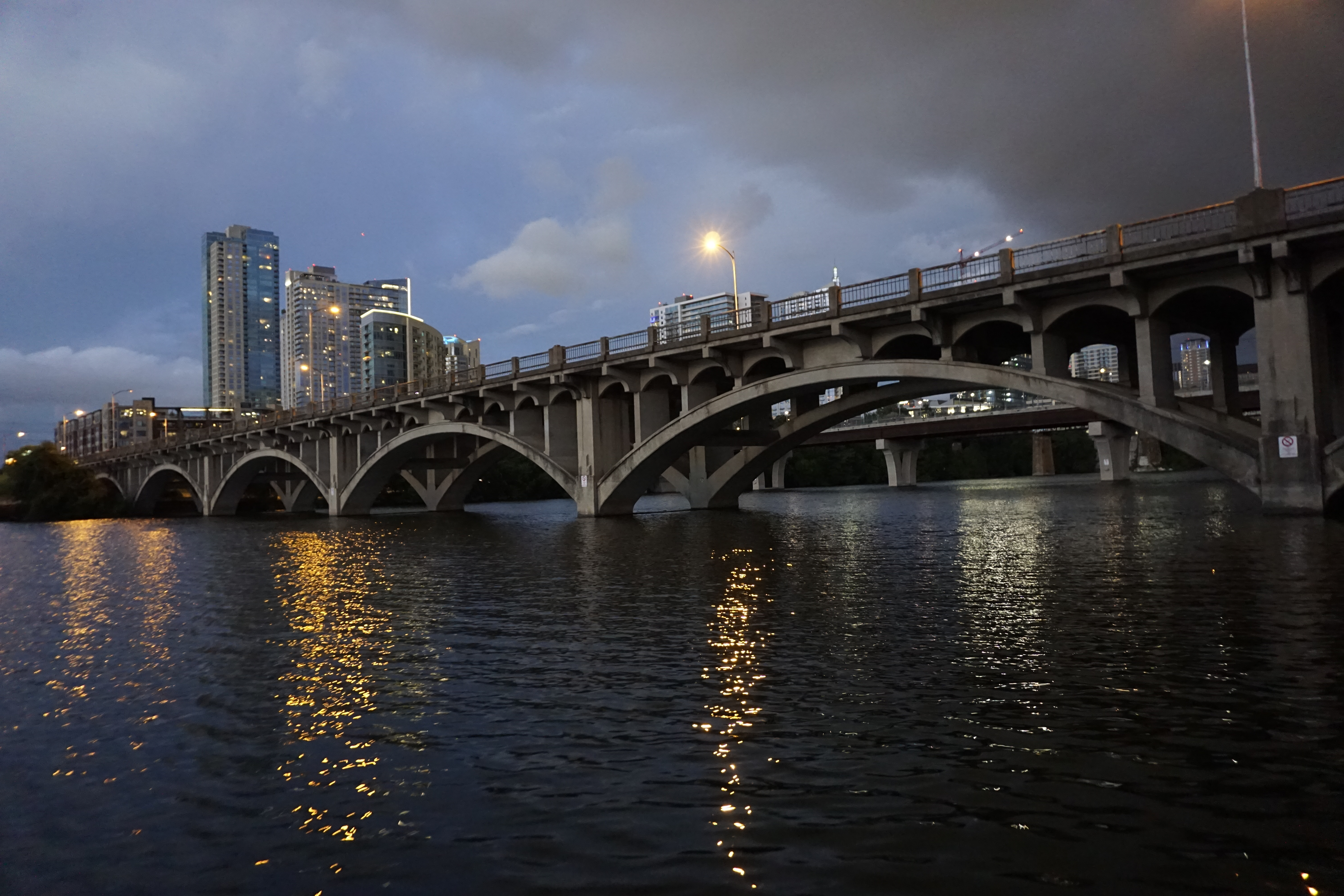
- Lamar Boulevard Bridge over Lady Bird Lake, viewed from the southwest
- Coordinates: 30°15′56″N 97°45′23″W
- Carries: Loop 343 (Lamar Boulevard)
- Crosses: Lady Bird Lake (Colorado River)
- Locale: Austin, Texas; United States
- Owner: State of Texas
- ID number: 142270011312065

Characteristics
- Design: Arch bridge
- Material: Reinforced concrete
- Total length: 659 feet (201 m)
- Width: 49 feet (15 m)
- Longest span: 110 feet (34 m)
- No. of spans: 6
- Piers in water: 5
- No. of lanes: 4

History
- Architect: Cage Brothers and L. A. Turner
- Construction start: March 27, 1941
- Construction cost: $303,900
- Opened: July 15, 1942
- Lamar Boulevard Bridge
- U.S. National Register of Historic Places
- Location within Texas Location within the United States
- Coordinates: 30°15′56″N 97°45′23″W
- Architectural style: Art Deco
- NRHP reference No.: 94000678
- Added to NRHP: July 7, 1994

The Lamar Boulevard Bridge is a historic arch bridge carrying Texas State Highway Loop 343 (Lamar Boulevard) over Lady Bird Lake in downtown Austin, Texas, United States. The bridge features six open-spandrel concrete arches spanning 659 feet (201 m) and carries tens of thousands of vehicles daily across the lake. Completed in 1942, the Lamar Boulevard Bridge was the second permanent bridge to cross the Colorado River (after the Ann W. Richards Congress Avenue Bridge), and one of the last Art Deco-style open-spandrel concrete arch bridges built in Texas. The bridge was named an Austin Landmark in 1993 and added to the National Register of Historic Places in 1994.

== History ==
In the late 1930s, Austin had greatly outgrown its original town plan on the north bank of the Colorado River. In 1939, the city planned a new major north–south thoroughfare to run to the west of the Texas State Capitol and connect the city's western housing developments. This new street, eventually named Lamar Boulevard, would roughly parallel the course of Shoal Creek, reaching the river's edge near the creek's mouth. On the south bank, the boulevard would continue onward to join what was then Texas State Highway 20, leading to Fredericksburg, Texas. As the city began building the boulevard, the Texas Highway Department (now the Texas Department of Transportation) was charged with designing and building a bridge to carry Highway 20 across the river.

Construction began on March 27, 1941, and the bridge was completed and opened to traffic on July 15, 1942, at a total cost of $303,900 (equivalent to $6,650,000 in 2025). At that time, the bridge was left without street lights, perhaps because of material shortages relating to World War II; these were later added in 1955. The construction of Longhorn Dam in 1960 transformed the river beneath the bridge into Town Lake (now known as Lady Bird Lake), raising the water level to just below the bottoms of the arches. The view of the Texas State Capitol from the bridge became one of the Capitol View Corridors protected under state and local law from obstruction by tall buildings in 1983.

On July 7, 1994, the bridge was added to the National Register of Historic Places in recognition of its architectural significance and its continuing importance to Austin's transportation infrastructure. Today, the bridge still carries Lamar Boulevard (now designated part of Texas State Highway Loop 343) across the Colorado and supports substantial pedestrian and vehicular traffic daily; a 2011 study by the Downtown Austin Alliance asserted that the bridge now experiences more than twice the traffic volume it was designed for.

=== Addition of parallel pedestrian bridge ===
The bridge was built with no dedicated bicycle lanes and with narrow sidewalks separated from the street only by low curbs. In the 1990s, the site became notorious for road accidents involving cyclists and pedestrians. The City of Austin explored possibilities for widening the bridge to add space for non-automotive traffic, but the Texas Historical Commission opposed these proposals out of a desire to preserve the bridge's historic design. This conflict eventually led in 2001 to the construction of the James D. Pfluger Pedestrian and Bicycle Bridge, situated 200 feet (61 m) to the east of the Lamar bridge.

== Design ==
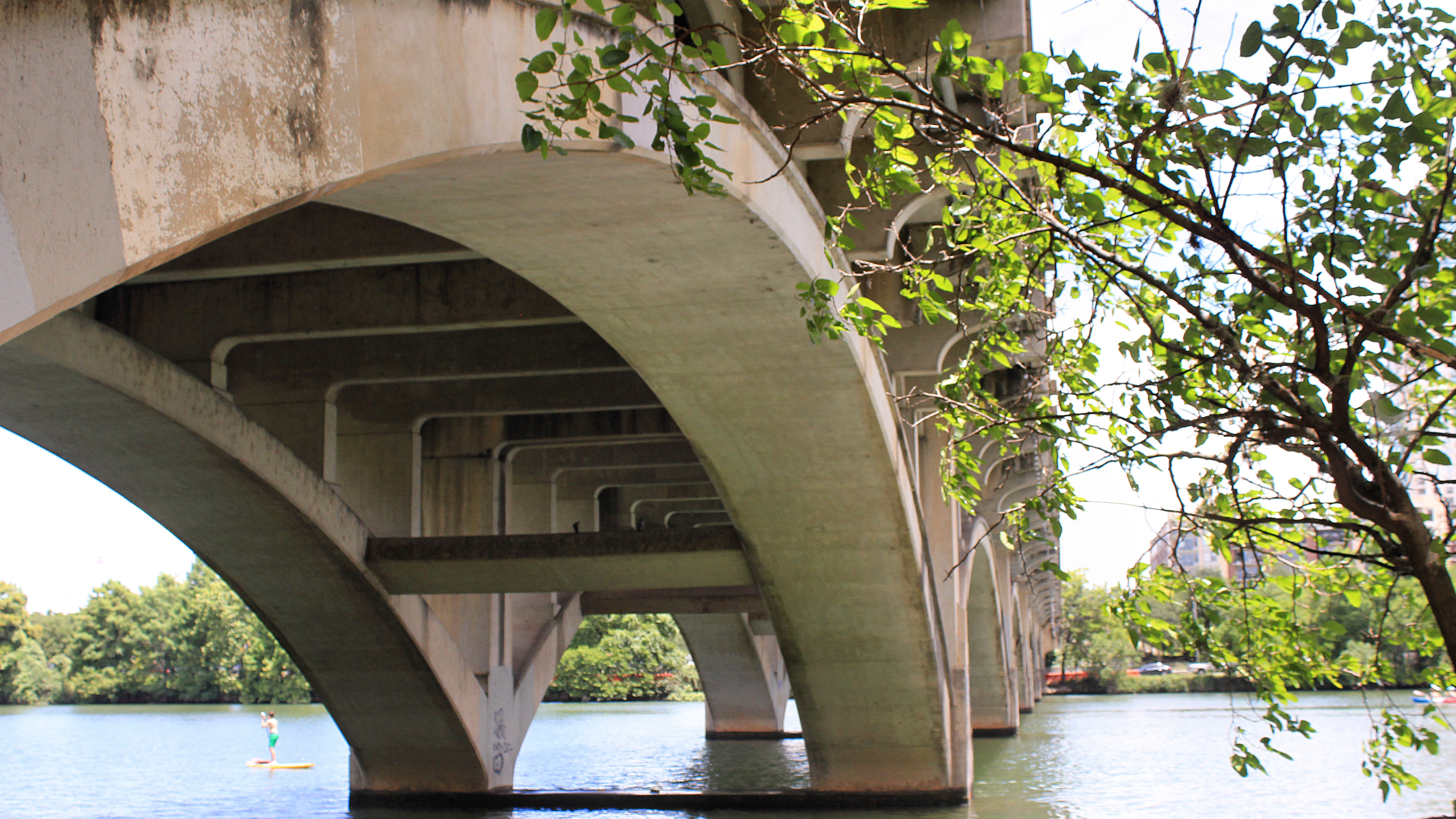
The bridge's substructure, viewed from the south shore

The Lamar Boulevard Bridge is an open-spandrel deck arch bridge made of poured-in-place reinforced concrete. It crosses the Colorado River with six identical 110-foot (34 m) spans, supported by five concrete piers on the river bed and by concrete abutments at the ends. The deck carries four roadway lanes, flanked by a sidewalk and metal balustrade on either side. The piers (originally visible, but now largely submerged) and pedestrian guardrails show Art Deco details, such as vertical fluting, which indicate the period of the bridge's construction.

The piers stand on spread-footing foundations resting on limestone bedrock. Each span rests on two parallel concrete segmental-arch ribs, each 8.5 feet (2.6 m) wide and 2.25 feet (0.69 m) thick, rising to a clearance of 19 feet (5.8 m) above the springline. A series of slender vertical columns rises through the open spandrels to support smaller longitudinal arches and transverse floor beams immediately beneath the deck. The floor beams cantilever roughly 7 feet (2.1 m) beyond the piers and columns to support the sidewalks and balustrades.

The pedestrian guardrails on the approaches to the bridge are solid concrete panels, while those along the deck take the form of tubular steel railings, linked by vertical steel bars and supported by concrete columns. Eight of these 12-by-15-inch (30 cm × 38 cm) columns rise from each deck span, punctuated by taller, heavier columns above the piers, which are built to support street lights.

== See also ==
- List of crossings of the Colorado River
- National Register of Historic Places listings in Travis County, Texas
- List of bridges on the National Register of Historic Places in Texas
