= Pennybacker Bridge =

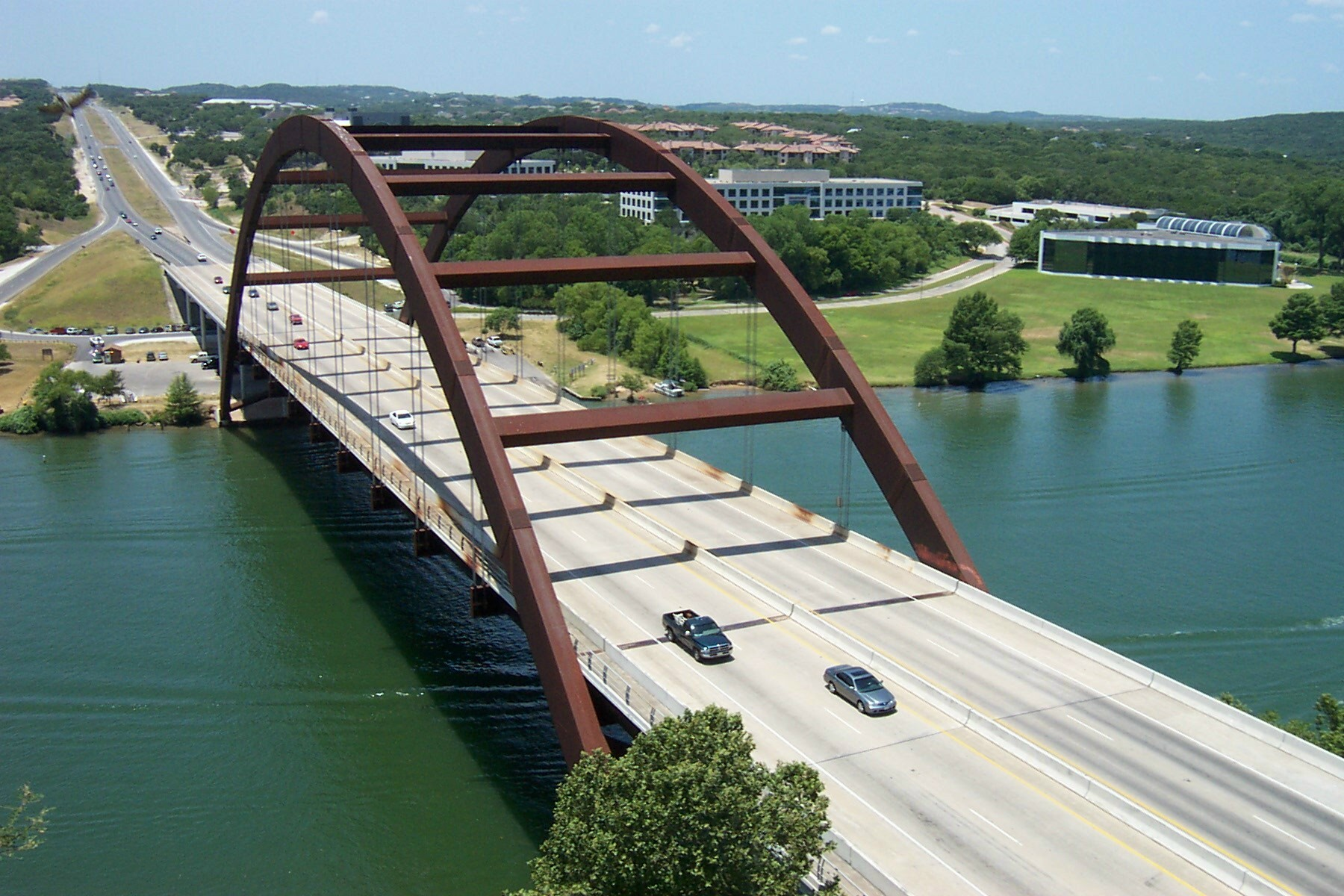
- Coordinates: 30.3500°N 97.7970°W
- Carries: 4 lanes of Loop 360, pedestrians, and bicycles
- Crosses: Lake Austin, Colorado River
- Locale: Austin, Texas
- Other name: 360 Bridge
- Maintained by: Texas Department of Transportation

Characteristics
- Design: Through arch
- Total length: 1,150 feet (351 m)
- Longest span: 600 feet (183 m)
- Clearance below: 100 feet (30 m)

History
- Opened: December 3, 1982; 43 years ago

Statistics
- Daily traffic: 48,000
- Toll: Free both ways

Location
- Interactive map of Pennybacker Bridge

The Percy V. Pennybacker Jr. Bridge in Austin, Texas, is a through-arch bridge across Lake Austin which connects the northern and southern sections of the Loop 360 highway, also known as the "Capital of Texas Highway". Due to its arched weathering-steel bridge and the rolling hills on its northern side, this structure is regarded as a scenic route in Texas.

In 2001, 48,000 vehicles crossed the bridge daily. Ten years prior to this, 22,000 vehicles had crossed the bridge daily.

== Specifications ==
The bridge is constructed such that no part of the structure touches the water 100 feet (30 m) below. The bridge is 1,150 feet (351 m) long with a 600-foot (183 m) central arched span. This design keeps Lake Austin free from support columns because the recreational lake (really a dammed stretch of the Colorado River) is popular with boaters and waterskiers. The untied arch suspension span is suspended by 72 steel cables. At the time of its construction, it was only the second bridge of its design in the world.

The bridge has four lanes, two in each direction, separated by a middle barrier wall. The bridge also has a 6-foot-wide (1.8 m) bike and pedestrian lane. The bike access on the bridge is one reason for Loop 360's popularity with cyclists. The south approach provides a turnaround under the bridge along with lake access for public boating.

=== Aesthetics ===
The steel bridge has a uniform weathered rust finish allowing the bridge to blend in with the surrounding hills and lake.

== History ==
=== Planning ===
Originally envisioned as a western circular road, Loop 360 began planning in 1962. As part of Loop 360's construction, a contractor was selected to cut into the rock at the site of the future bridge and approach roads due to the area's terrain. This rock debris was deposited along the lakeshore at the site of the proposed bridge, raising environmental concerns. At one point, the Austin Navigation Board considered legal action against the contractor responsible for the rock debris.

Throughout the design and build process, concerns were expressed by elected officials and residents over the environmental effects of such a bridge, particularly the possibility of concrete pillars being driven into the lakebed. The bridge was redesigned in 1978 as a tied-arch bridge to avoid placing pillars into the water.

The contract for the bridge was let in late 1979.

=== Construction ===
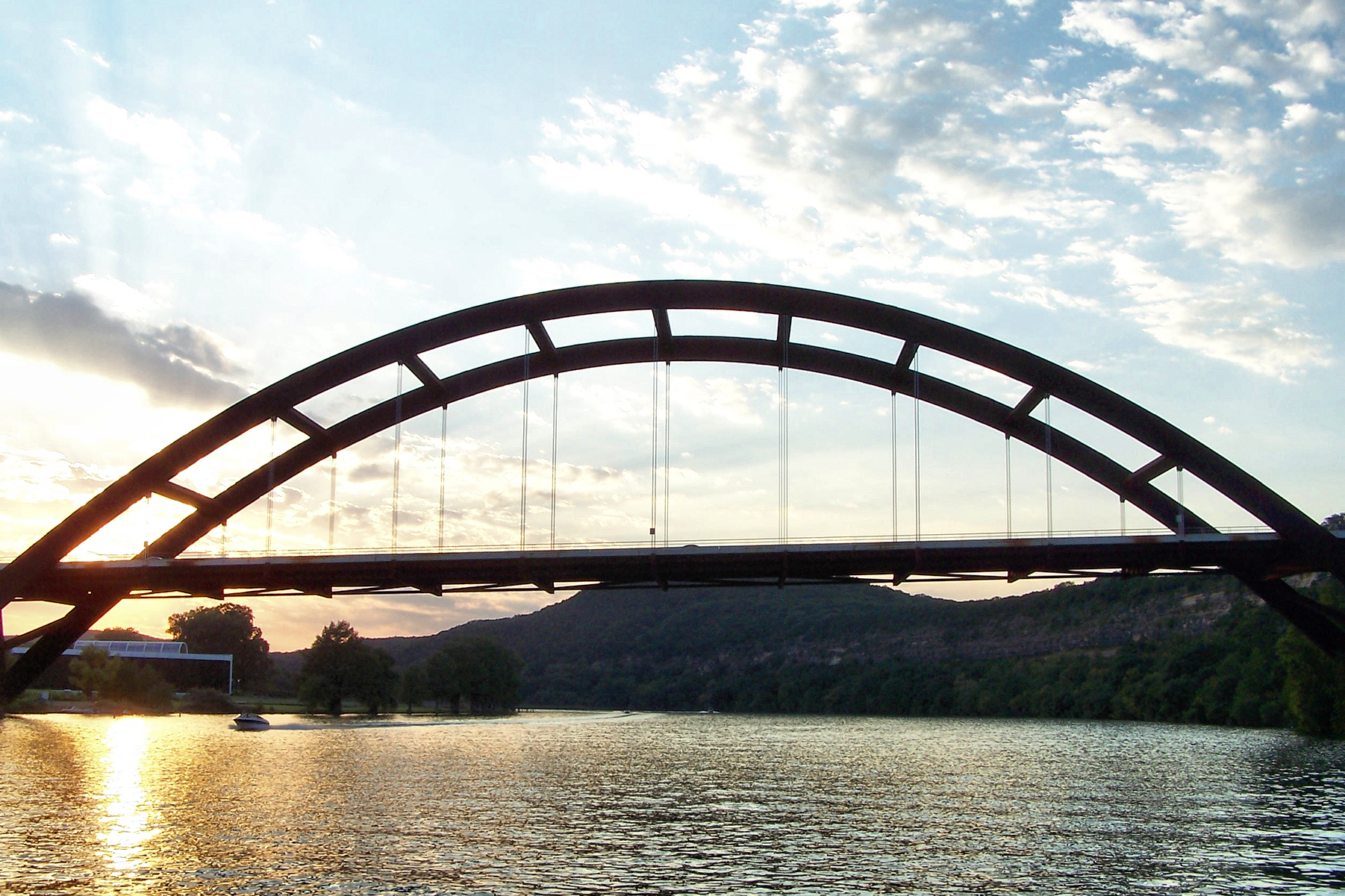
Pennybacker Bridge from the water

The 600 short tons (544,311 kg) of steel for the bridge were produced in Japan. The bridge structures were fabricated in Ulsan, Korea by Hyundai Heavy Industries. The steel structures were shipped on the Jundale freighter to the Port of Houston and then trucked to the bridge site. The bridge was erected by Bristol Steel of Bristol, Virginia. The roadway surface is built from 3,400 short tons (3,000,000 kg) of concrete. The finish was sandblasted to ensure even weathering for an amber patina. The construction was coordinated by Clearwater Constructors (Hensel Phelps) of Denver, Colorado. Ed Westall was the project coordinator, Buddy Johnson was the project supervisor and David W. McDonnold was the bridge designing engineer. The bridge cost US$10 million to build.

Additionally, a local metal fabricator, Beck Tool & Manufacturing (Thomas L. Beck, Owner) was contracted to machine many of the critical components that anchor the cables suspending the roadway. Major structural steelwork was finished by July 1982

=== Completion ===
The bridge was dedicated officially November 29, 1982 by Austin mayor Carole McClellan and other public officials and opened for traffic December 3, 1982.

== Overlook ==
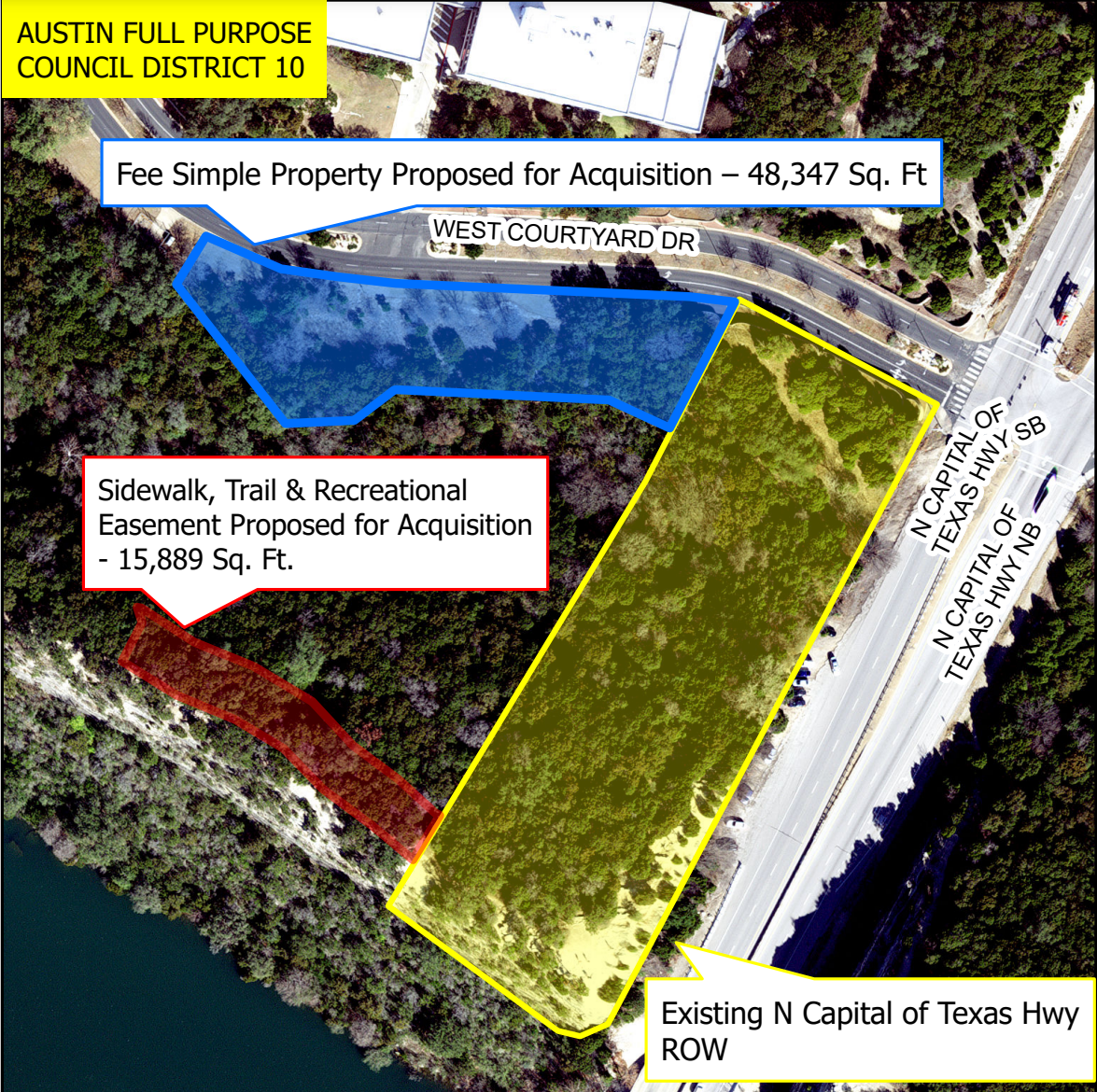
Map of overlook

Due north of the Pennybacker Bridge, on the west side of Loop 360, is a popular scenic overlook. In 2019, KVUE described this overlook as "one of Austin's most popular spots to take a picture". In 2017, KXAN-TV described this overlook as "one of the most iconic spots in Austin". The overlook has been a tourist destination since at least 2011.

The overlook currently sits on undeveloped right of way for Loop 360, whose shoulder is frequently used for illegal parking. In spite of it being an illegal parking spot, the official city blog recommends that visitors park there.

In 2022, TxDOT began construction on a series of improvements to Loop 360, some of which will see the removal of the shoulder where people currently park.

At a December 12, 2024 Austin City Council meeting, council members voted unanimously to commence with eminent domain proceedings to acquire 1.1 acres bordering the overlook for parking and an additional 0.3648 acre easement for a sidewalk trail and recreational use.

The land that would be subject to eminent domain has been owned by Jonathan C. Coon, founder of 1-800 Contacts, since 2018. At the time of his purchase, Coon had planned to donate nearly 30 acres of his 145 acre purchase to the City of Austin for the establishment of a city park with legal parking, however, those plans fell through. The remaining part of Coon's property is being developed as the Four Seasons Private Residences Lake Austin.

== Naming ==
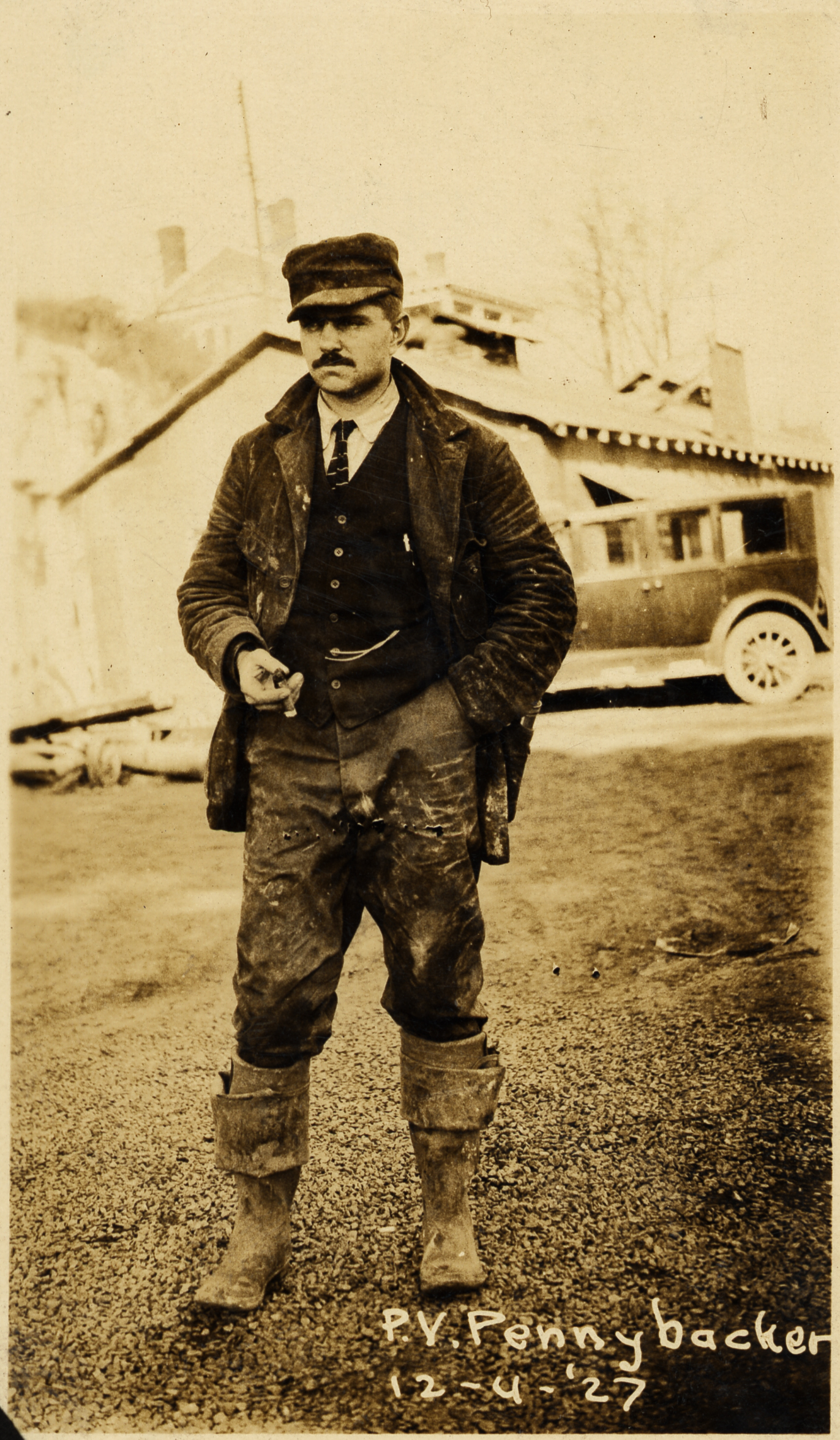
Percy Pennybacker, namesake of the bridge

The bridge is named for Percy V. Pennybacker Jr., who designed bridges for the Texas Highway Department and was a pioneer in the technology of welded structures. Pennybacker, a resident of Austin since 1939, worked for the department for over 20 years before retiring in 1957.

== Awards ==
The bridge won first place in the 1984 Federal Highway Administration's Excellence in Highway Design competition. In 1992, the Austin members of the Consulting Engineers Council of Texas were surveyed and selected the bridge as the most innovative example of Austin architecture.

== See also ==
- List of crossings of the Colorado River
