= Eanes Independent School District =

School district in Texas

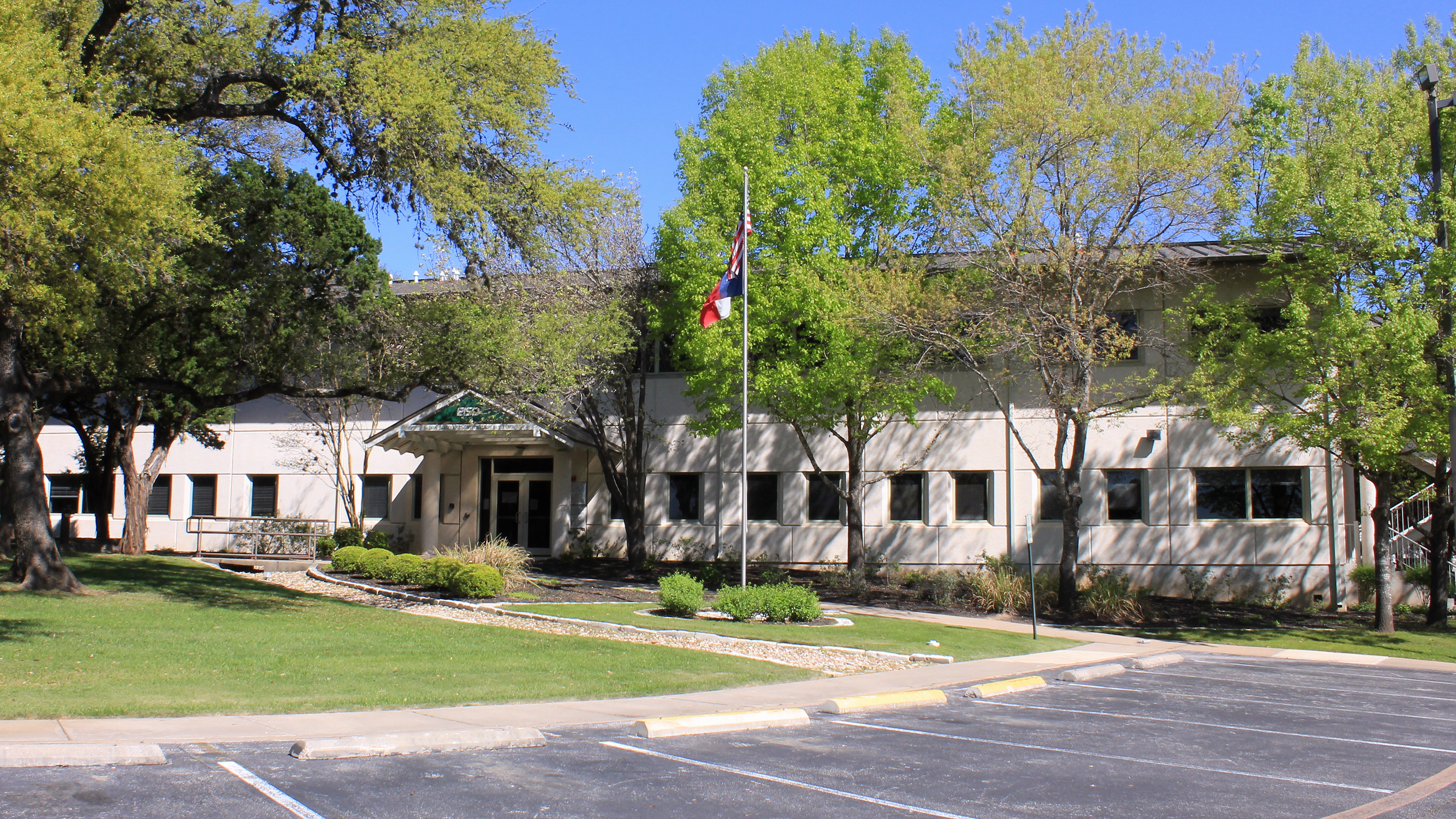
- The district headquarters

Location
- Austin, TX Central Texas United States

District information
- Type: Public School District
- Grades: PreK–12
- Established: 1958
- Schools: 9 Schools (6 elementary, 2 middle schools, 1 high school)
- NCES District ID: 4817760

Students and staff
- Students: 7,968
- Teachers: 605.44 (FTE)
- Staff: 479.18 (FTE)
- Student–teacher ratio: 13.16

Other information
- Website: www.eanesisd.net

Eanes Independent School District (EISD) (/ˈiːnz/ EENZ) is a school district headquartered in unincorporated Travis County, Texas (USA), in Greater Austin. Its enrollment is about 7,814 students, distributed among six elementary schools, two middle schools, and one high school. All nine schools are rated Exemplary - the highest designation possible - in the State of Texas 2009 accountability ratings, marking the second consecutive year for that accomplishment. The district's overall state is Exemplary, making Eanes ISD one of just two 5A districts in the state to receive that designation in 2009. Only 9.5 percent of districts statewide are rated exemplary. See the bottom of this page for more information about TEA accountability ratings.

The school district encompasses the whole city of West Lake Hills, a majority of Rollingwood, the Lost Creek neighborhood, and parts of Austin including Davenport, the Rob Roy neighborhoods, Seven Oaks, and the Cuernavaca neighborhoods. As of 2013, EISD covers 11.7 square miles (30 km^{2}) of land within the City of Austin, making up 3.7% of the city's territory.

== History ==
"A log cabin built on property of Robert Eanes (1805-95) in 1872 was the first Eanes school. In 1874 the school was moved to a one-room frame structure on this adjacent 2-acre tract given by William and Sophia Teague. Itinerant Ministers conducted worship service in the Schoolhouse, and a community cemetery was located nearby. Eanes Chapel, organized in 1923 by University Presbyterian Church in Austin, erected a stone building in 1928. It was purchased in 1956 for classrooms. The Eanes Independent School District, created in 1958, is now (1975) a modern educational complex with over 1,800 Students." Quote from a plaque located on the current Eanes Elementary Campus.

"The year 1957 proved to be a watershed year for the Eanes community because that year county officials decided to close down the county’s school system. Eanes residents faced two alternatives. They could vote to join the Austin Independent School District or they could go it alone and establish their own system…the voters, on April 12, 1958, opted to stay independent…establishing the Eanes Independent School District."

== Academic Achievements ==
Texas nonprofit, Children at Risk, 2014 Greater Austin School District Rankings – Eanes ISD is ranked #3 in the Austin Area and #33 in the State based on Student Achievement, Campus Performance and Growth.

As of 10 January 2017 the district spends $18,000 per student, above the national average.

Eanes ISD is ranked number one in the state for Best Places to Teach, College Readiness, and Best Facilities as of December 1, 2015. On the national level, Westlake was the only comprehensive four-year Texas public school in the top 60.

== Technology in Schools ==
"The Eanes school district will become one of the first in the state to distribute iPads to every single one of its students, kindergarten through 12th grade." Jan. 2013

== Schools ==
=== Westlake High School ===
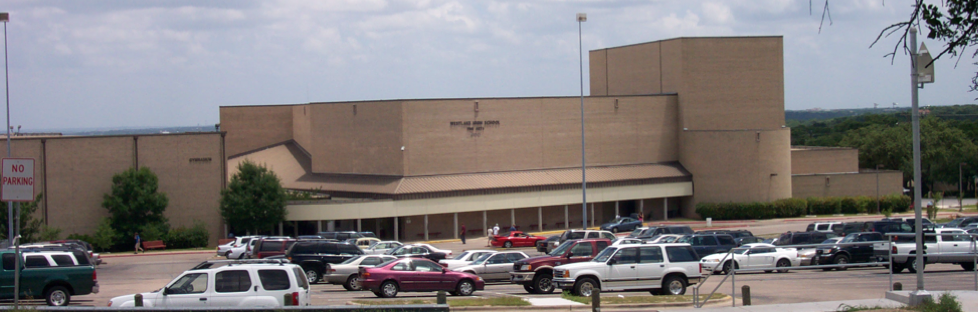
Westlake High School's Performing Arts Center

Westlake High School (established 1969) has an enrollment of about 2,400 students. The school is a U.S. Blue Ribbon School and has won the Texas Successful Schools Award for Outstanding Performance. Its principal is Steve Ramsey. The school is a member of the Model Schools initiative. The current recognition by the TEA is under the Exemplary rating, the highest possible.

=== Middle schools ===
- Hill Country Middle School (established 1975) has an enrollment of about 900 students. The school was named a U.S. Blue Ribbon School in 1990-91 and has won the Texas Successful Schools Award for Outstanding Performance. Its principal is Kimberly Dewrell.
- West Ridge Middle School (established 1987) has an enrollment of about 903 students. The school was named a U.S. Blue Ribbon School in 1992-93 and has won the Texas Successful Schools Award for Outstanding Performance. Its principal is Erika Bacon.

=== Primary schools ===
- Barton Creek Elementary School (established 1991) - mascot: Blue Jays - Principal: Brandis Smoland - 2000-01 National Blue Ribbon School
- Bridge Point Elementary School (established 1997) - mascot: Bobcats - Principal: Sheri Bryant
- Cedar Creek Elementary School (established 1978) - mascot: Eagles - Principal: Jennifer Dusek
- Eanes Elementary School (established 1872) - mascot: Mustangs - Principal: Lesley Ryan - National Blue Ribbon School in 1996-97 and 2005
- Forest Trail Elementary School (established 1984) - mascot: Falcons - Principal: Holly Reid - 1989-90 National Blue Ribbon School
