= James D. Pfluger Pedestrian and Bicycle Bridge =

Pedestrian bridge in Austin, Texas

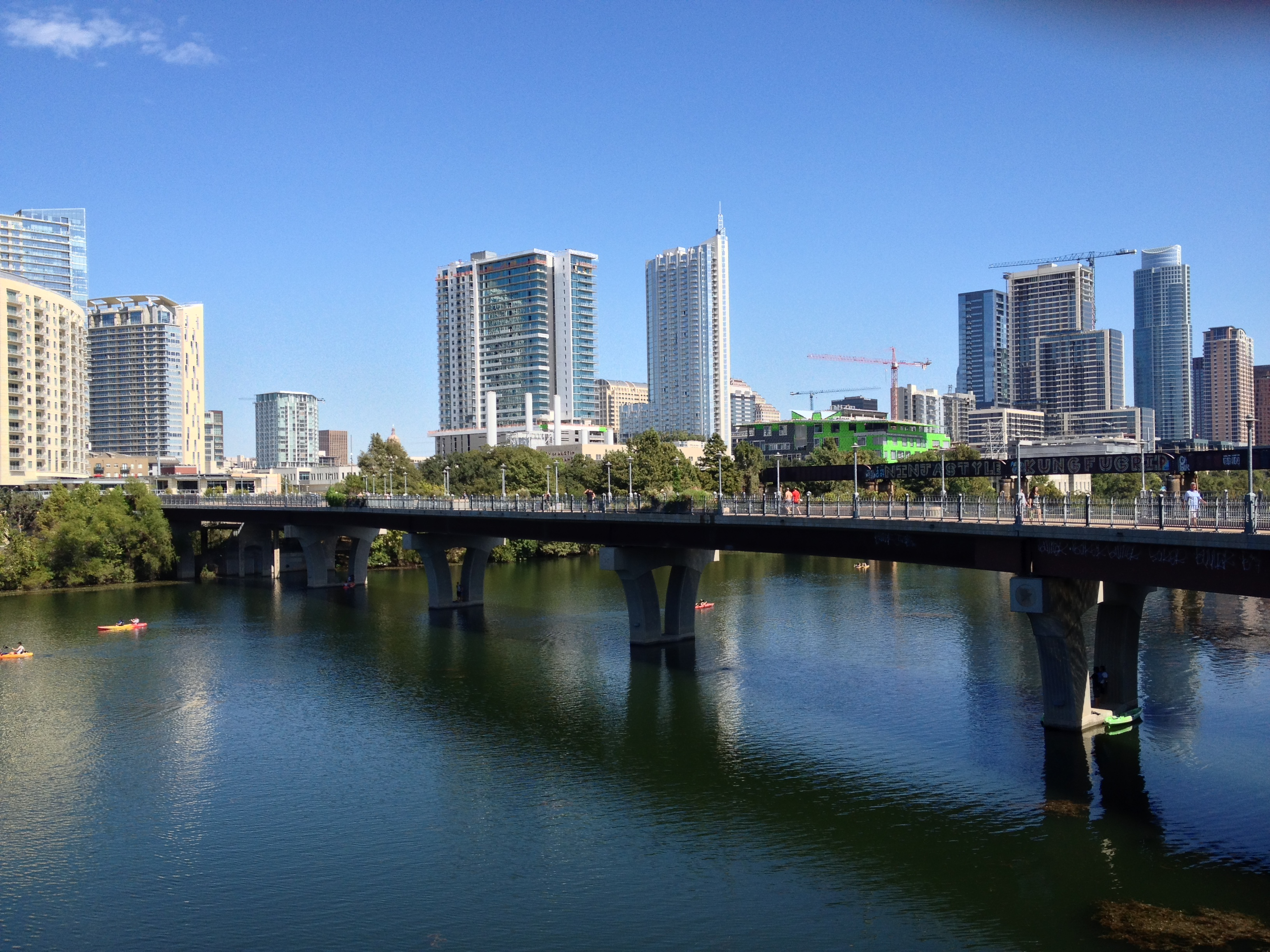
- The bridge viewed from the southwest, from the nearby Lamar Boulevard Bridge
- Coordinates: 30.265°N 97.756°W
- Carries: Pedestrians and bicycles
- Crosses: Lady Bird Lake (Colorado River)
- Locale: Austin, Texas; United States
- Owner: City of Austin

Characteristics
- Design: Double curve deck, helix ramp, curved connectors, cast-in-place reinforced concrete piers
- Material: Weathering steel, reinforced concrete
- Total length: 812 feet (247 m)
- Width: Varies from 23 feet (7.0 m) to 42 feet (13 m)
- Longest span: 124 feet (38 m)

History
- Architect: Kinney & Associates, Carter Design Associates
- Construction start: 15 May 2000
- Opened: 16 June 2001

Location
- Interactive map of James D. Pfluger Pedestrian and Bicycle Bridge

The James D. Pfluger Pedestrian and Bicycle Bridge is a shared use bridge for pedestrians and cyclists spanning Lady Bird Lake in downtown Austin, Texas. Opened in 2001, the bridge connects the north and south sides of the Ann and Roy Butler Hike-and-Bike Trail and features an unusual "double curve" design. The bridge runs parallel to the Lamar Boulevard Bridge, which carries road traffic across the lake roughly 200 feet (61 m) to the west.

== History ==
The Lamar Boulevard Bridge is one of the main routes across Lady Bird Lake in downtown Austin, but it offers no dedicated bicycle lanes and only narrow sidewalks separated from the street by low curbs. As the growth of Austin in the 1980s sent ever-increasing traffic across the bridge, near misses between vehicles, cyclists and pedestrians became increasingly common. In 1991, a drunk driver hit and killed a cyclist on the bridge. By the mid-1990s concerns about the safety of the crossing prompted the city to raise funds through a municipal bond issuance and a federal matching funds grant to widen the Lamar bridge and improve its safety design.

Early in the design process, however, the Texas Historical Commission indicated that the overall design of the existing bridge could not be changed, since it had been designated as a historic structure and added to the National Register of Historic Places in 1994. Community members in stakeholder meetings also generally opposed adding new traffic lanes to the bridge. Instead, in March 1998 the Austin City Council directed the engineering contractor to explore the possibility of building a separate bridge for pedestrian use. A city design session in May 1998 gathered local architects, engineers, and citizens to propose designs for a pedestrian crossing.

The workshop produced, among other options, a design for a bridge with a "double curve" deck connecting the trails on the north and south shores along natural "paths of travel," giving the bridge an hourglass shape and curved connectors. This design was ultimately selected by city council, and construction began on May 15, 2000; the bridge was officially opened to pedestrian and cyclist traffic on June 16, 2001, whereupon it was named for James D. Pfluger, a notable Austin-area architect who designed parts of the city's hike and bike trail system.

=== Extension ===
The original design of the bridge had called for a long northwestern ramp to stretch over Cesar Chavez Street and connect to the Lance Armstrong Bikeway and downtown, but budget limitations led to the elimination of that section from the original construction in 2000–2001. In 2010, however, city council approved funding for the completion of that final section of the bridge. Construction on the new connector began on March 15, 2010 and was completed on March 1, 2011.

== Design ==
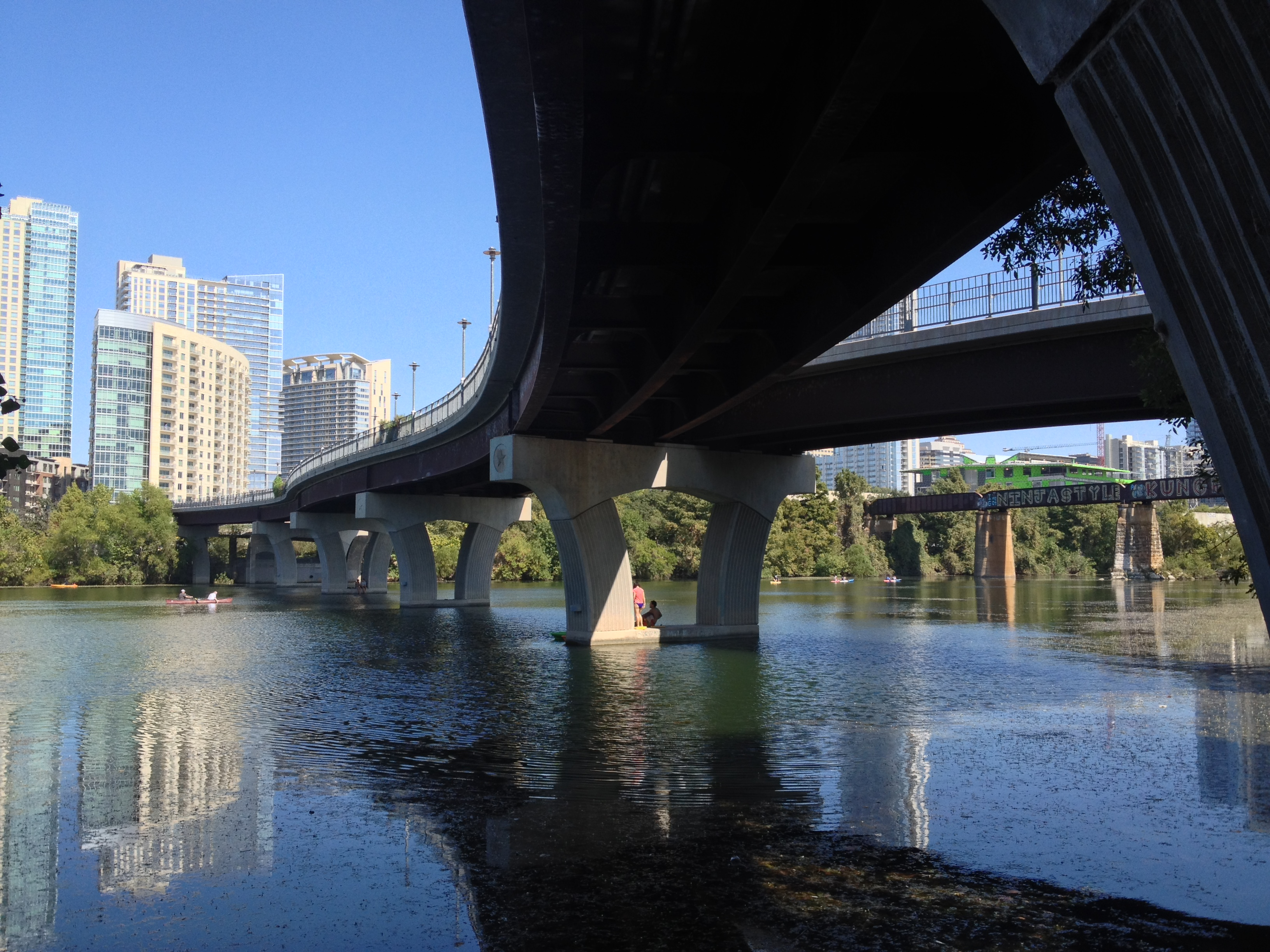
Substructure viewed from the southwest at shore level

While exploring possible designs for the bridge in May 1998, the city held a public workshop, which generated fifteen proposed concepts, including typical cable-stayed and arch bridges, relocation of an existing historical truss bridge, and several types of beam bridges. A group of five workshop participants developed a "double curve" design in which the deck would follow logical "paths of travel" connecting the trail system along the south shore of Lady Bird Lake to the trails and bikeway on the north shore. This resulted in two curved avenues crossing each other over the lake, intersecting and overlapping to create a wider space in the middle that could serve as a gathering place and look-off point. Building on this concept, the architects designed a structure with a double-hourglass-shaped deck and featuring helical ramps and curved connector spans at each end — a bridge with no straight lines.

For ease of construction, the structure was designed like a typical highway bridge, using steel plate girders (the architects chose weathering steel for aesthetic and maintenance reasons). In the central portion where the two curves intersect, the girders have a complex reverse curvature with variable spacing to match the curvature of the deck and maintain a constant overhang and reasonable interior deck spans. Atop this base sits a 12-inch (30 cm) reinforced concrete deck — again, a design feature typical of highway bridges. The substructure of supporting piers consists of cast-in-place reinforced concrete bents standing in the lake.

== See also ==
- List of crossings of the Colorado River
