= Old Iron Bridge (Bastrop, Texas) =

Bridge in Texas, U.S.

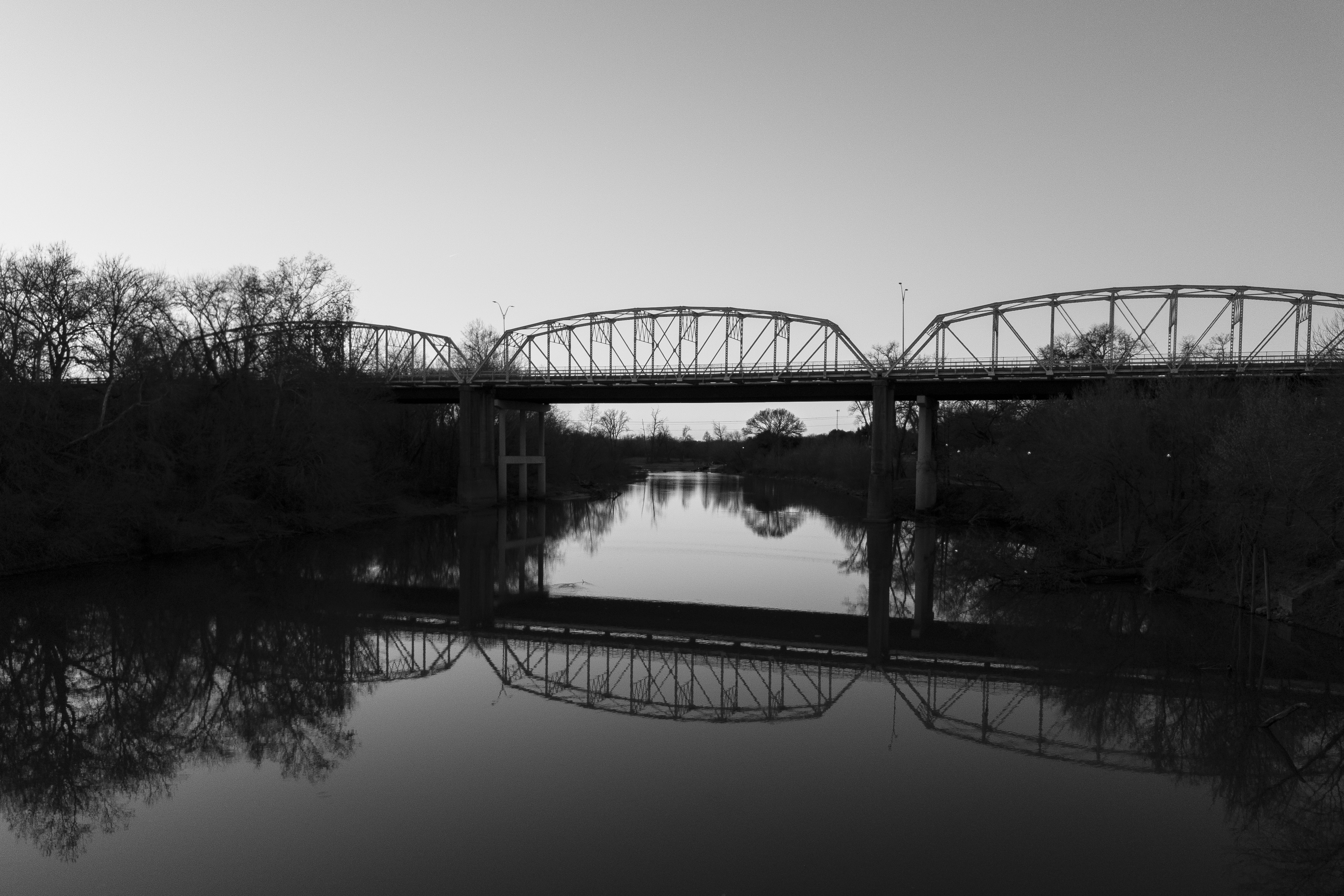
- Pedestrian bridge crossing the Colorado River in Bastrop
- Coordinates: 30°06′36″N 97°19′23″W
- Carries: Pedestrian traffic
- Crosses: Colorado River
- Locale: Bastrop, Texas; USA
- Owner: City of Bastrop

Characteristics
- Design: Parker through truss bridge
- Material: Steel, reinforced concrete
- Total length: 1,285 feet (392 m)
- Longest span: 192 feet (59 m)
- No. of lanes: 2

History
- Architect: G.G. Wickline
- Contracted lead designer: R.E. Schiller
- Constructed by: Kansas City Bridge Company
- Construction start: 1923
- Construction cost: $167,500
- Opened: January 1924
- Old Iron Bridge
- U.S. National Register of Historic Places
- Location within Texas Location within the United States
- Coordinates: 30°06′18″N 97°19′22″W
- Area: less than one acre
- MPS: Bastrop Historic and Architectural MRA
- NRHP reference No.: 90001031
- Added to NRHP: July 19, 1990

Location
- Interactive map of Old Iron Bridge

The Old Iron Bridge, historically referred to as the Colorado River Bridge at Bastrop, is a 1,285-foot (392 m)-long bridge with three steel truss spans and concrete piers that crosses the Colorado River in Bastrop, Texas, United States. The bridge is one of the earliest surviving uses of the Parker truss in Texas.

== History ==
With automobiles becoming the dominant form of transportation in the United States after World War I, a new bridge was needed to handle the increasing traffic between Houston and Austin. The original estimate of the cost of the Old Iron Bridge was $45,000 and was partially financed by bonds and local taxes. Bids on the project were solicited and the Kansas City Bridge Co. was selected as contractor. The final cost of the bridge's construction was $167,500. The bridge was completed in 1923 and opened for use in January 1924. The original bridge was torn down in the early 1930s.

The bridge was listed in the National Register of Historic Places on July 19, 1990.

== See also ==
- National Register of Historic Places listings in Bastrop County, Texas
- List of bridges on the National Register of Historic Places in Texas
- List of crossings of the Colorado River
