= Percy Pennybacker =

American civil engineer (1895–1963)

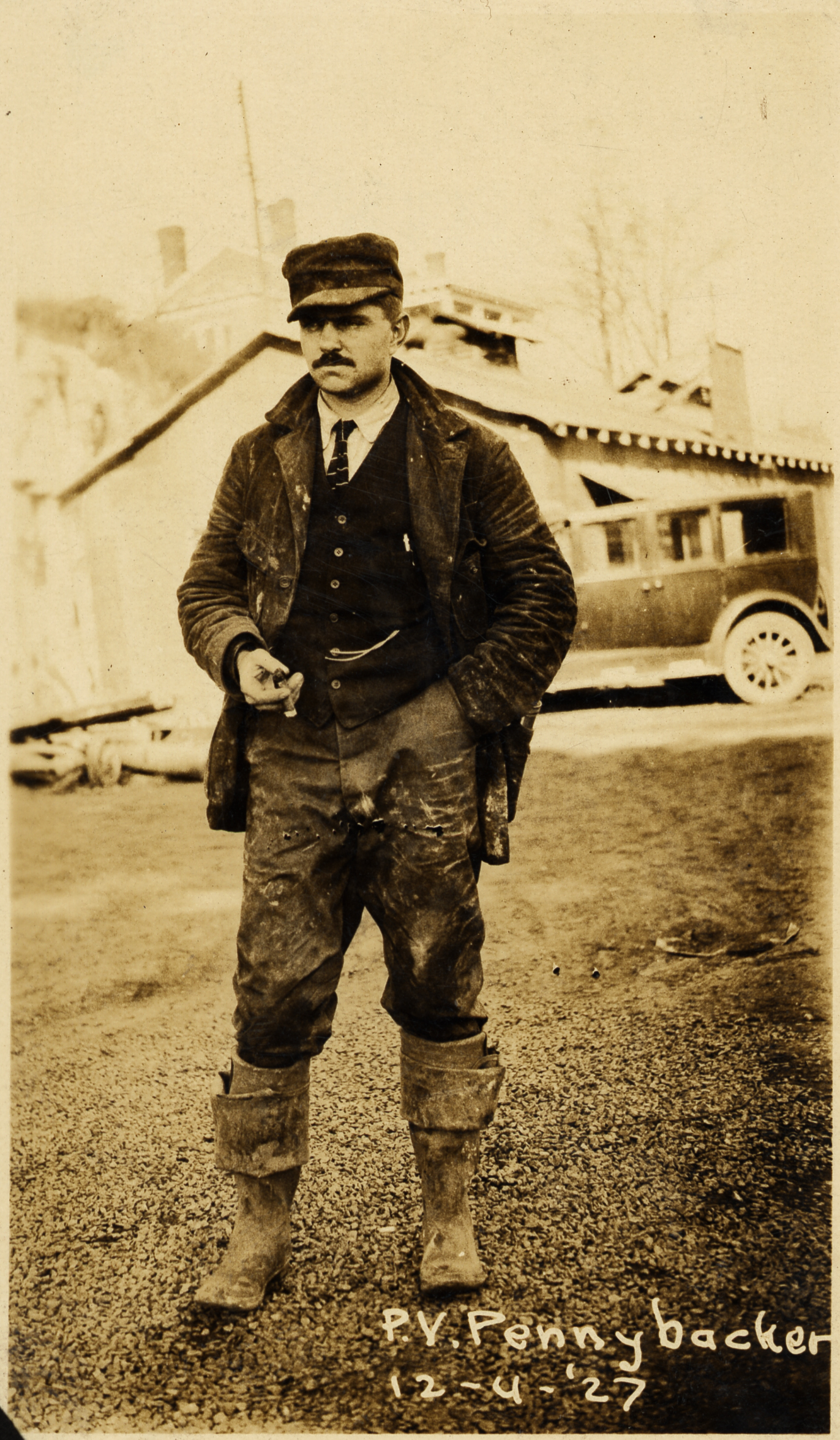
P. V. Pennybacker

Percy V. Pennybacker Jr. (1895–1963) was a Texas civil engineer who pioneered the technology of welded structures, particularly for bridges.

== Professional success ==
Pennybacker worked for the Texas Highway Department in the early 1900s designing bridges. He earned his civil engineering degree from the University of Texas at Austin. He served as a captain in the Army Air Service during World War I. After the war, he worked in Kansas and Texas. During World War II, he became interested in welded construction as an alternative to rivets. By promoting the use of welding for heavy stress bridge design, he is credited with saving the state of Texas millions of dollars.

When he retired from the Texas Highway Department, he worked another three years for the city of Austin as a civil engineer.

He was honored as "Outstanding Engineer" by the Texas Society of Professional Engineers, was a member of the American Society of Civil Engineers, and brought the American Welding Society to Austin.

== Childhood ==
His father, also Percy V. Pennybacker, and mother Anna (née Hardwicke) Pennybacker married in Tyler, Texas in 1884. Percy junior was born in Palestine, Texas and was one of four children. His father, a school superintendent, suffered from diabetes and died of the disease in 1899 while Percy was young. Like his father, Percy too suffered from diabetes. After spending a year in the hospital as a young civil engineer, he became one of the first patients treated with insulin. His mother Anna, an educator and activist wrote and published A New History of Texas for Schools, which was adopted by the Texas Legislature for use in public schools from 1898 through 1913. The family moved from Palestine to Austin in 1900.

== Non-professional life ==
He married Mary Alice. An Episcopalian, he helped found St. George's Episcopal Church in Austin.

== Recognition ==
The iconic Pennybacker Bridge (a.k.a. the "360 bridge") in Austin, Texas is named in his honor.
