= Winchell, Texas =

- Unincorporated community
- Location within Texas Location within the United States
- Coordinates: 31°28′20″N 99°09′39″W
- Country: United States
- State: Texas
- County: Brown
- Elevation: 1,348 ft (411 m)
- Time zone: UTC-6 (Central (CST))
  - Summer (DST): UTC-5 (CDT)
- Area code: 325
- GNIS feature ID: 13780793

Winchell is an unincorporated community in Brown County, Texas, United States.

== History ==
Winchell was founded around 1900. Its population was estimated to have dropped to 10 in 2010, then grew to 20 in 2019.

== Geography ==
Winchell is located approximately 21 miles southwest of Brownwood along U.S. Highway 377 in southwestern Brown County, near the McCulloch County line.

== Education ==
In the 1920s, Winchell had a two-story school building. By the early 1930s, its high school joined the Brookesmith Independent School District, while the elementary school followed suit in the 1940s. Today, Winchell is served by the Rochelle Independent School District.
