= Texas State Highway Loop 343 =

State highway in Texas

State Highway Loop 343

Route information
- Maintained by TxDOT
- Length: 5.186 mi (8.346 km)
- Existed: 1961–present

Major junctions
- South end: US 290 / SH 71
- East end: I-35

Location
- Country: United States
- State: Texas

Highway system
- Highways in Texas; Interstate; US; State; Former; Toll; Loops; Spurs; FM/RM; Park; Rec
← Spur 342	→ Loop 344

Loop 343 is a 5.186-mile (8.346 km) state-maintained roadway located in Austin, Texas.

== History ==
Loop 343 was formed on May 30, 1961, along the previous routes of SH 71 and US 290 as those roads were realigned. It passed through downtown Austin along 6th and 7th Streets to Lamar Boulevard.

It was rerouted on February 25, 1977, to use 1st Street (now Cesar Chavez Street) west of I-35. On November 10, 1986, the portion east of I-35 was removed from state maintenance, forming the current alignment.

Between 1978 and 2008, a segment of Cesar Chavez Street in downtown Austin was one-way eastbound. Westbound traffic on Loop 343 was diverted to Second and Third Streets before merging back onto Cesar Chavez Street at . In 2008, as part of a larger public works project, the City of Austin converted Cesar Chavez Street back to two-way traffic along its entire length.

== Route description ==
Loop 343 begins in south Austin at the intersection of US 290/SH 71 and the southern terminus of Loop 360. It proceeds north along Lamar Boulevard for 3.5 miles (5.6 km) towards downtown Austin. Here, it crosses Lady Bird Lake on the Lamar Boulevard Bridge. This segment of Loop 343 is a four-lane heavily developed urban road.

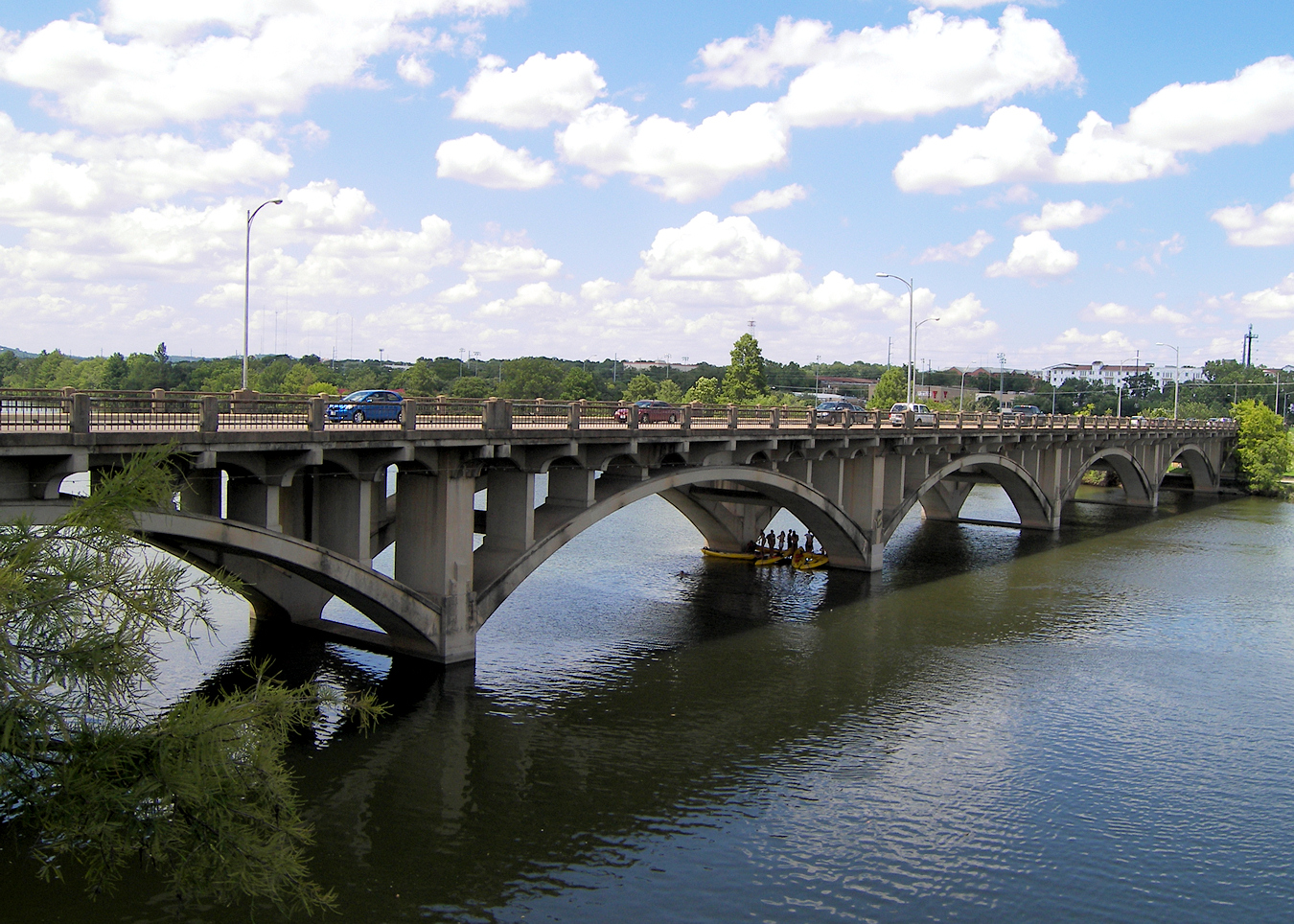
Loop 343 (Lamar Boulevard) crossing Town Lake

At this point, Loop 343 heads east along Cesar Chavez Street for 1.6 miles (2.6 km), past Austin City Hall and the Austin Convention Center, to its terminus at I-35. This segment of Loop 343 is a four-lane downtown road.

== Junction list ==
The entire route is in Austin, Travis County.

mi	km	Destinations	Notes
		US 290 / SH 71 / Loop 360	
		I-35	
1.000 mi = 1.609 km; 1.000 km = 0.621 mi
