= West Lake Hills, Texas =

City in the United States

- City
- Location of West Lake Hills, Texas
- Coordinates: 30°17′31″N 97°48′30″W
- Country: United States
- State: Texas
- County: Travis
- Incorporated: September 9, 1953; 73 years ago

Area
  - Total: 3.59 sq mi (9.31 km^{2})
  - Land: 3.59 sq mi (9.31 km^{2})
  - Water: 0 sq mi (0.00 km^{2})
- Elevation: 863 ft (263 m)

Population (2020)
  - Total: 3,444
  - Density: 914.5/sq mi (353.08/km^{2})
- Time zone: UTC-6 (Central (CST))
  - Summer (DST): UTC-5 (CDT)
- ZIP code: 78746
- Area code: 512
- FIPS code: 48-77632
- GNIS feature ID: 2412223
- Website: www.westlakehills.org

West Lake Hills (locally referred to as "Westlake") is a city in Travis County, Texas, United States. As of the 2020 census, its population was 3,444. It is a suburb west of central Austin.

== History ==
West Lake Hills was founded by Emmett Shelton and incorporated in 1953. Shelton played a significant role as a land planner for the city. The Emmett Shelton Bridge, named in his honor, is an important infrastructure that connects West Lake Hills with Austin.

The community developed rapidly in the 1970s and 1980s, especially on the south side of the Colorado River.

== Geography ==
According to the United States Census Bureau, the city has a total area of 3.7 square miles (9.6 km^{2}), all land.

== Demographics ==
Historical population
Census	Pop.	Note	%±
1960	714		—
1970	1,488		108.4%
1980	2,166		45.6%
1990	2,542		17.4%
2000	3,116		22.6%
2010	3,063		−1.7%
2020	3,444		12.4%
U.S. Decennial Census

=== 2020 census ===
As of the 2020 census, West Lake Hills had a population of 3,444. The median age was 48.0 years; 23.6% of residents were under the age of 18 and 24.4% of residents were 65 years of age or older. For every 100 females there were 97.9 males, and for every 100 females age 18 and over there were 96.9 males age 18 and over. All residents lived in urban areas, while 0.0% lived in rural areas. There were 1,242 households in West Lake Hills, of which 36.2% had children under the age of 18 living in them. Of all households, 68.5% were married-couple households, 12.6% were households with a male householder and no spouse or partner present, and 14.9% were households with a female householder and no spouse or partner present. About 17.2% of all households were made up of individuals and 9.5% had someone living alone who was 65 years of age or older. There were 1,370 housing units, of which 9.3% were vacant. The homeowner vacancy rate was 1.6% and the rental vacancy rate was 23.0%.

Racial composition as of the 2020 census
Race	Number	Percent
White	2,882	83.7%
Black or African American	9	0.3%
American Indian and Alaska Native	1	0.0%
Asian	175	5.1%
Native Hawaiian and Other Pacific Islander	3	0.1%
Some other race	41	1.2%
Two or more races	333	9.7%
Hispanic or Latino (of any race)	301	8.7%

=== 2000 census ===
As of the 2000 census, there were 3,116 people, 1,143 households, and 873 families residing in the city. The population density was 835.7 inhabitants per square mile (322.7/km^{2}). There were 1,185 housing units at an average density of 317.8 per square mile (122.7/km^{2}). The racial makeup of the city was 95.60% White, 0.29% African American, 0.29% Native American, 1.28% Asian, 0.71% from other races, and 1.83% from two or more races. Hispanic or Latino of any race were 3.85% of the population.

There were 1,143 households, out of which 40.0% had children under the age of 18 living with them, 69.0% were married couples living together, 5.2% had a female householder with no husband present, and 23.6% were non-families. 17.5% of all households were made up of individuals, and 6.0% had someone living alone who was 65 years of age or older. The average household size was 2.71 and the average family size was 3.10.

In the city, the population was spread out, with 28.1% under the age of 18, 4.3% from 18 to 24, 22.1% from 25 to 44, 35.5% from 45 to 64, and 10.1% who were 65 years of age or older. The median age was 43 years. For every 100 females, there were 100.0 males. For every 100 females age 18 and over, there were 97.3 males.

The median income for a household in the city of West Lake Hills was $116,905, and the median income for a family was $232,913. Males had a median income of $116,371 versus $43,969 for females. The per capita income for the city was $55,651. About 0.6% of families and 2.0% of the population were below the poverty line, including 1.8% of those under age 18 and none of those age 65 or over. In June 2010, the average home price was $1,225,697.

== Education ==
West Lake Hills is the only city completely within the Eanes Independent School District. Residents are zoned to Eanes Elementary School, Bridge Point Elementary School, Barton Creek Elementary School, Cedar Creek Elementary School, Forest Trail Elementary School, Hill Country Middle School, West Ridge Middle School, and Westlake High School.

== Notable residents ==
- Celeste and Steven Beard
