= Texas State Highway Loop 360 =

Highway in Texas

State Highway Loop 360
- Capital of Texas Highway

Route information
- Maintained by TxDOT
- Length: 13.99 mi (22.51 km)
- Existed: 1962–present

Major junctions
- South end: US 290 / SH 71 / Loop 343 in Austin
- Loop 1; RM 2244; RM 2222
- North end: US 183 in Austin

Location
- Country: United States
- State: Texas

Highway system
- Highways in Texas; Interstate; US; State; Former; Toll; Loops; Spurs; FM/RM; Park; Rec
← Spur 359	→ Loop 361

Loop 360 is a 13.99-mile (22.51 km) loop route in Austin in the U.S. state of Texas. Loop 360, also known as the Capital of Texas Highway, is a scenic highway winding through the hills of West Austin. The road is described by the Texas Department of Transportation (TxDOT) as "a 4-lane depressed median arterial with at-grade signalized intersections". In 2021, the average daily traffic was 58,497 vehicles at the most traveled point, north of RM 2222.

== History ==
Loop 360 was designated on March 29, 1962, on its current route from US 290 to US 183. On September 30, 1969, Loop 360 was extended north to Loop 1. On April 25, 1996, the section from US 183 to Loop 1 was canceled and removed from the state highway system. The south section of Loop 360 from US 290 to RM 2244 was opened on February 11, 1970. The last section of roadway for Loop 360 (excepting the bridge) between RM 2244 and FM 2222 was approved on September 30, 1976. The north and south sections of Loop 360 were connected when the Pennybacker Bridge was opened for traffic on December 3, 1982. On February 19, 1980, the Travis County commissioners voted to designate it the "Capital of Texas Highway".

On July 14, 2004, the Capital Area Metropolitan Planning Organization (CAMPO) changed segments of the future designation to a toll road, despite popular outcry. However, toll conversion of the road is unfunded so plans to toll Loop 360 are delayed indefinitely and there remains substantial opposition to any toll conversion of the road from residents and environmentalists. CAMPO has begun to reexamine the toll roll designation. The road should remain tollless for at least the near future. On December 6, 2006, the Mobility Alternatives Finance Study final report, commissioned by the City of Austin and other central Texas municipalities, noted the poor financial feasibility of toll conversion by stating "Loop 360's toll revenue funds the smallest share of its construction cost (7%)" given a construction cost of $741 million with revenue bonds backed by future tolling of Loop 360 contributing just $51.8 million (in 2006 dollars).

=== Historical markers ===
There are three historical markers along Loop 360:

- "The Johnson Smokehouse" marker is at the entrance to the Woods of Westlake Heights subdivision, just south of Westbank Drive. The marker commemorates the Johnson Ranch. Charles Johnson, a native of Sweden, procured the original 124 acre (0.5 km^{2}) ranch on the south side of present-day Loop 360 in 1867. The smokehouse beside the marker was relocated from the original ranch house site. According to the marker, the smokehouse was painstakingly catalogued, stone by stone, disassembled and restored to its original state." The smokehouse's tin roof is built with tin salvaged from the temporary Texas capitol building, which burned down in 1899.
- The "Eanes-Marshall Ranch" marker is at the Loop 360 entrance to Saint John Neumann Catholic Church. Alexander Eanes (1806–1888) acquired the property for the ranch by 1857. Alexander later sold the ranch to his brother, Robert Eanes (1805–1895) after the Civil War. Robert sold the ranch to his son-in-law, Hudson Boatner Marshall (1862–1951) in 1883. A log cabin built on the ranch was the first Eanes school and the surrounding community assumed the Eanes name.
- The "Balcones Fault Aids Colonization of Texas" historical marker is north of Bull Creek on the west side of Loop 360. It commemorates the role that the Balcones Fault played in the Anglo-American settlement of Texas.

== Route description ==
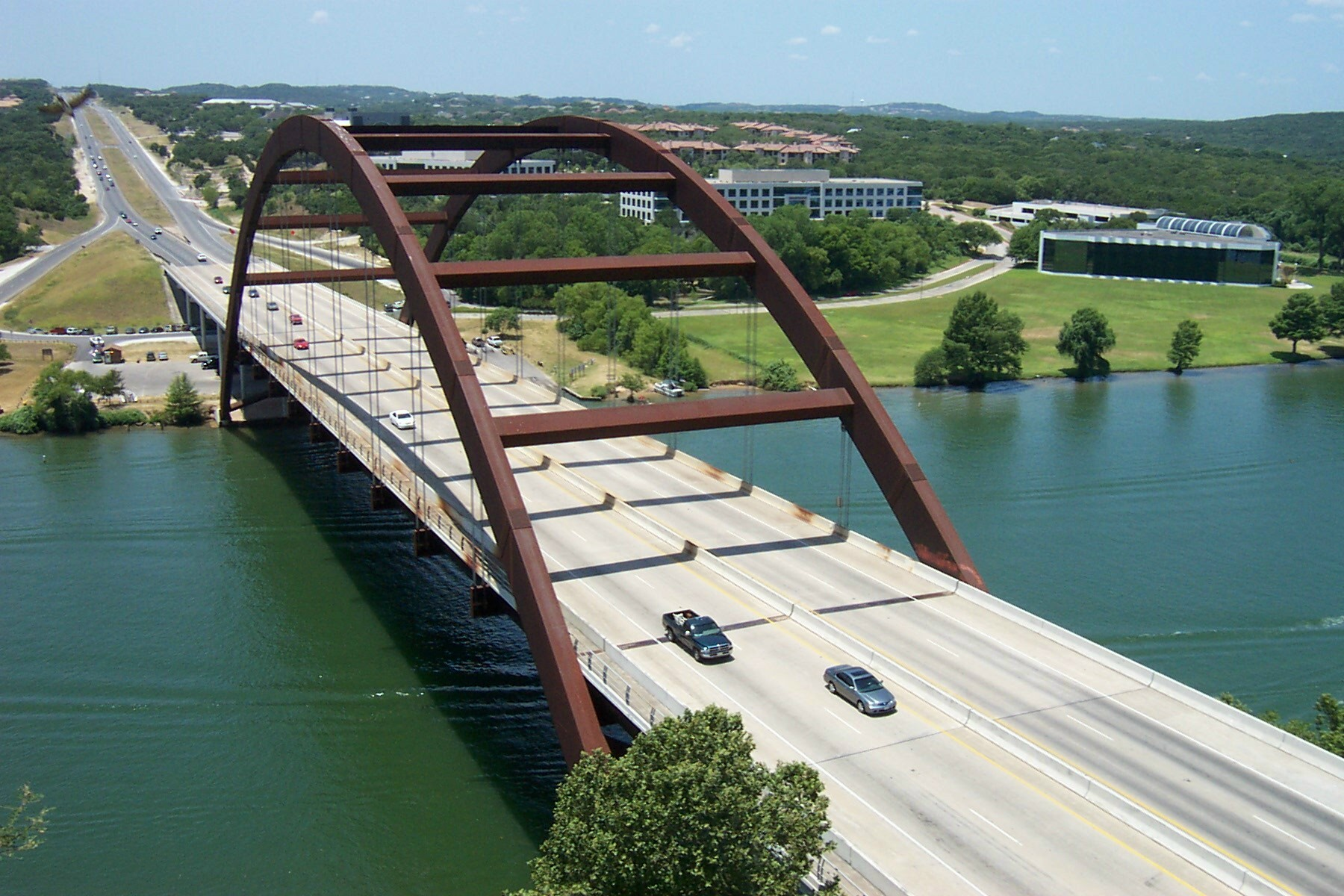
The Pennybacker Bridge.

The road runs roughly north–south, arcing slightly out to the west. Listing the major intersections going south to north, Loop 360 begins at US 290/SH 71, then crosses Loop 1 (Mopac Expressway), then crosses RM 2244 (a.k.a. Bee Cave Road), then bridges the Colorado River at the Pennybacker Bridge, then crosses RM 2222, then terminates at US 183. The entire length of Loop 360 is 13.8 miles (22.2 km). An extension of 0.7 miles (1.1 km) to connect the northern end of Loop 360 with Loop 1 was once considered part of the Loop, but has since been removed from the state highway system.

The segment of Loop 360 south of US 183 is designated a scenic roadway by the City of Austin.

The road is popular with cyclists because of the road's hills, wide shoulders for biking, and bike access across the Pennybacker Bridge. Because of the hilly terrain on the east side of the road, with right timing and clear weather, a traveler on loop 360 in early morning can enjoy multiple sunrise scenes; the most spectacular of which can be seen from the Pennybacker Bridge over Lake Austin.

The road has rock cut-throughs as well as steep fills and has steep roadway grades, 6% to 7% in some areas.

The road cuts through environmentally sensitive watersheds. It bridges Barton Creek just south of Loop 1 and runs along the east side of the Barton Creek Greenbelt. Northward, it passes to the west of Wild Basin Wilderness Preserve. Just after the Wild Basin entrance, drivers and bikers can pull into a scenic vista and take in a view of downtown Austin including the state capitol building and University of Texas Tower. Further north, Loop 360 crosses the Colorado River and enters the Bull Creek Watershed and crosses Bull Creek.

Land use restrictions along Loop 360 help preserve Loop 360's Hill Country aesthetic.

== Proposed modifications ==
In an attempt to alleviate traffic along Loop 360 TxDOT has considered turning the road into a toll road, making it a highway with an overpass or adding Michigan left turns. The latter is favored by TxDOT but opposed by nearby residents.

== Junction list ==
The entire route is in Austin, Travis County. All exits are unnumbered.

mi	km	Destinations	Notes
0.0	0.0	US 290 / SH 71 / Loop 343 (Lamar Boulevard)	Southern terminus; interchange
1.2	1.9	Loop 1 (Mopac Expressway)	Interchange
4.8	7.7	RM 2244 (Bee Caves Road)	Interchange
		Westlake Drive / Cedar Street	Interchange expected to open in 2025
9.3– 9.5	15.0– 15.3	Pennybacker Bridge over the Colorado River	
9.9	15.9	RM 2222	Interchange
14.0	22.5	US 183 (Research Boulevard)	Northern terminus; interchange
1.000 mi = 1.609 km; 1.000 km = 0.621 mi: Unopened
