= French M. Robertson Unit =

Maximum-security state prison in Abilene, Texas, US

French Robertson Unit
- Location in Texas
- Location: 12071 FM 3522 Abilene, Texas 79601; 32°33′23″N 99°37′59″W
- Status: Operational
- Security class: G1-G5, Restricted Housing, Transient
- Capacity: 2,984
- Opened: September 1992
- Managed by: TDCJ Correctional Institutions Division
- Warden: Jennifer Cozby
- Website: www.tdcj.texas.gov/unit_directory/rb.html

The French M. Robertson Unit is a maximum-security state prison located on Farm to Market Road 3522 in Abilene, Texas, United States, 10 miles (16 km) northeast of Downtown Abilene in Jones County.

The prison for males, classified as a "prison," is operated by the Correctional Institutions Division of the Texas Department of Criminal Justice, administered as within Region VI.

The Robertson Unit has space for 1,244 inmates in General Population, plus a large Restricted Housing facility. The Unit has a large garment manufacturing facility, which makes garments for several other State and local corrections facilities. Also notable, is the Robertson Unit's kennel of tracking dogs, and horses for mounted operations.

The unit is named after French M. Robertson, a lawyer and oil businessman from Abilene, Texas.

Beginning in September 2010, the prison serves as a regional release unit for prisoners exiting the TDCJ.

== History ==
The unit opened in November 1992.

In 1996 a correctional officer fired a bullet, which he described as a "warning" shot, towards an inmate that he said was running from an outside work squad. The bullet hit the inmate between the eyes, killing him. No outside investigation occurred. The Robertson warden declared the "Officer of the Year" award over, giving it to the officer who shot the prisoner.

On July 16, 2016, Correctional Officer Mari Anne Johnson was beaten to death by an inmate. Her body was found near the kitchen; she had also suffered an injury to the throat. The inmate, Dillion Compton, who was serving time for child rape, was sentenced to death for the murder in 2018.

== Notable prisoners ==
Inmate name	TDCJ Number	Status	Details
Enrique Gutierrez Arochi	02094923	Currently serving a life sentence. Eligible for parole in 2044.	Convicted in 2016 for the kidnapping and murder of Christina Morris in 2014. Morris had been reported missing after spending the evening with friends. Morris' DNA was later found in the trunk of Arochi's vehicle, which led to his conviction for aggravated kidnapping. Arochi was given a life sentence. Morris' remains were found in woodland in 2018.
Don Wilburn Collins	01977485	Currently serving a 40-year sentence. Scheduled for release on March 5, 2053.	
Anthony Bernard Hampton	00668364	Currently serving a life sentence. Eligible for parole in 2028.	Convicted in 1993 for the murder of Pete Shrum earlier that year. Anthony committed an armed robbery with his nephew, Wayne Hampton, at a convenience store where 61-year old Shrum was working. Despite Shrum cooperating with the robbers' remands, they executed him. Both suspects were spared the death penalty but were convicted of aggravated robbery and capital murder, and were given life sentences. Wayne is incarcerated at the Mark W. Michael Unit. Both suspects will become eligible for parole on March 30, 2028.
Colton Aaron Pitonyak	01413729	Currently serving a 55-year sentence. Scheduled for release on August 22, 2060.	Convicted in 2007 for the murder of Jennifer Cave in August 2005. Pitonyak had gone out for dinner with Cave to celebrate her new job. Afterwards they returned to Pitonyak's apartment, where he murdered her by shooting her in the chest. Pitonyak then mutilated Cave's body after death, before fleeing to Mexico. Cave's remains were found in the apartment two days after her death. Five days later, Pitonyak was arrested by Mexican authorities and was returned to the U.S. Pitonyak was convicted of murder and was given a 55-year sentence.
James Richard “Ricky” Thompson	01661932	Currently serving a life sentence. Eligible for parole in 2039.	Convicted in 2011 for the murder of John Goosey and Stacy Barnett in July 2009. The murders were reportedly a result of a drug deal debt. Thompson arrived at Barnett's apartment and shot Goosey multiple times in the head, before he went upstairs and killed Barnett herself. Thompson was arrested three days after the murders. Thompson was convicted of two counts of capital murder and was given a life sentence.
