= ICGA =

ICGA may refer to:

- Indian Coast Guard Academy
- Imperial Continental Gas Association
- Indocyanine green angiography
- ICGA Journal – International Computer Games Association Journal
- Islamic Center of Greater Austin
