= University Baptist Church (Austin, Texas) =

Historic church in Texas, United States

- U.S. National Register of Historic Places
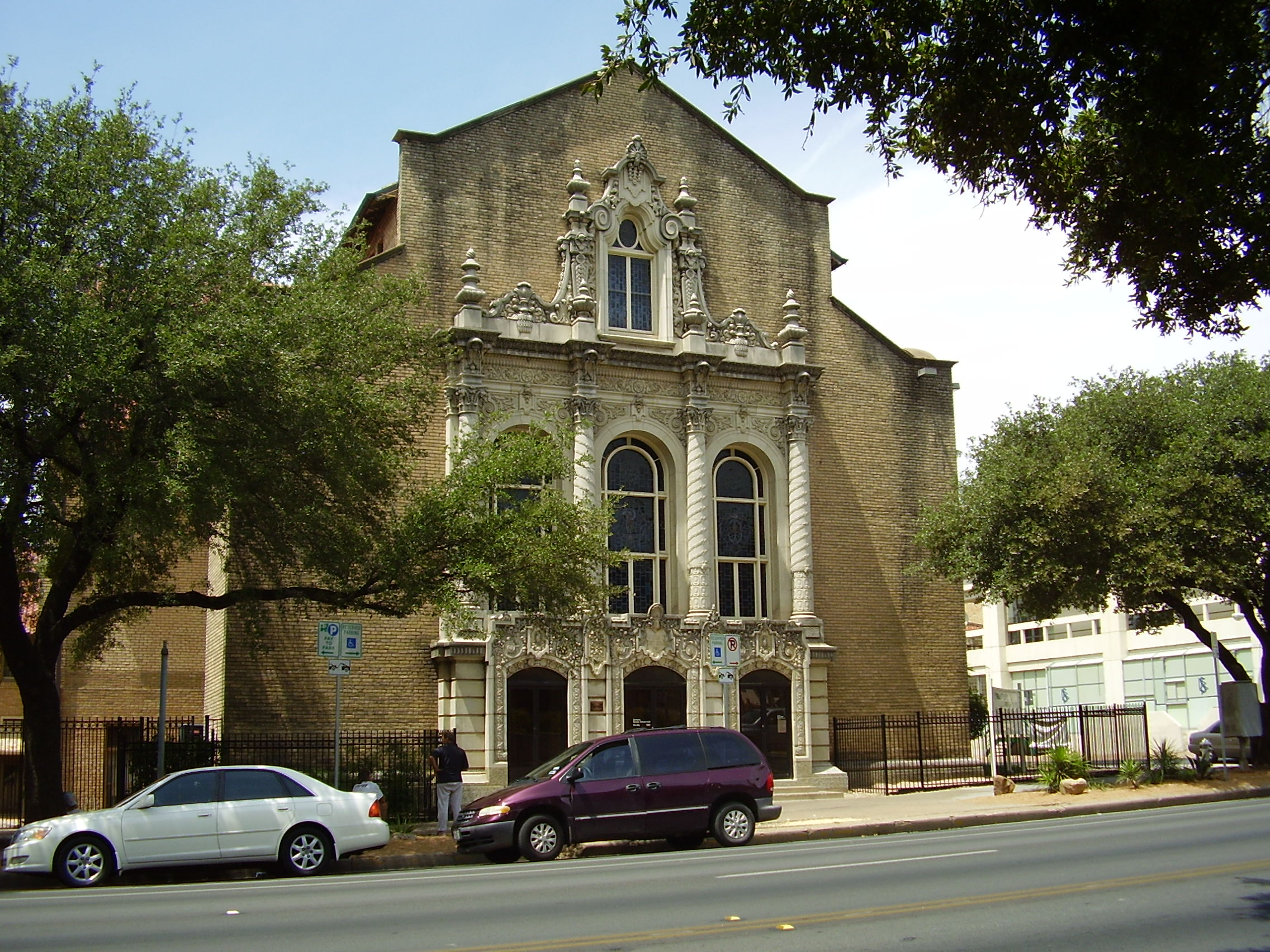
- The main building of the University Baptist Church in 2009
- Location: 2130 Guadalupe St; Austin, Texas, USA
- Coordinates: 30°17′05″N 97°44′32″W
- Built: 1921
- Architect: Albert Kelsey
- Architectural style: Spanish Colonial Revival
- NRHP reference No.: 98000955
- Added to NRHP: July 31, 1998

University Baptist Church is a progressive Baptist church located in Austin, Texas, USA. It is affiliated with the Alliance of Baptists, the American Baptist Churches USA, the Association of Welcoming and Affirming Baptists, and the Baptist Peace Fellowship of North America.

== History ==
It was organized in 1907–1908 to serve students at the University of Texas. Originally leasing space from the Highland Presbyterian Church, the church was officially chartered on September 27, 1908, with 80 original members. The University church building was completed in 1921.

In 1914, the church absorbed members of the then-defunct Central Baptist Church, soon growing to almost 500 members. In 1916 the church purchased land at the southwest corner of 22nd Street and Guadalupe Street to construct a church building. Philadelphia architect Albert Kelsey designed the structure in the Spanish Colonial Revival style to match the University of Texas buildings across the street. In his original plans, he had included a bell tower, but it was removed due to financial constraints. The sanctuary building included, fellowship halls, pastoral offices, bible study rooms and the sanctuary. It was built to house 1,100 people and was an immediate cornerstone of the "Drag" (Guadalupe Street).

The church welcomed African Americans as members in 1943 under the leadership of Dr. Blake Smith, becoming one of the first integrated churches in the Southern Baptist Convention. The church was expelled from the Austin Baptist Association for doing so (though it was later readmitted). The church earned further notoriety in the 1970s when it began ordaining women as deacons.

In 1995, the church was again expelled from the Austin Baptist Association for ordaining a gay man as deacon. The church stood by its position, and in 1997, for this and other reasons, the church voted to disaffiliate itself with the Southern Baptist Convention. In recent years the church has become known for its welcoming stance toward homosexuals and has joined several like-minded church organizations. It is affiliated with the Alliance of Baptists, the American Baptist Churches USA, the Association of Welcoming and Affirming Baptists, and the Baptist Peace Fellowship of North America.

The main church building, completed in 1921, was added to the National Register of Historic Places in 1998. It features a carved stone facade facing Guadalupe Street and cathedral ceiling vaults with an excellent acoustical signature, and has hosted performances by Willie Nelson and Larry Gatlin. A student union building was added to the west in 1949, featuring a Charles Umlauf sculpture relief over the front door.

== See also ==
- Alliance of Baptists
- Association of Welcoming and Affirming Baptists
- Baptist Peace Fellowship of North America
- LGBT-affirming Christian denominations
