= West Fifth Street Bridge =

West Fifth Street Bridge may refer to:

- Ashtabula lift bridge, a bridge over the Ashtabula River in Ashtabula, Ohio
- West Fifth Street Bridge at Shoal Creek, a bridge in downtown Austin, Texas
