= Carson College for Orphan Girls =

- U.S. National Register of Historic Places
- U.S. Historic district
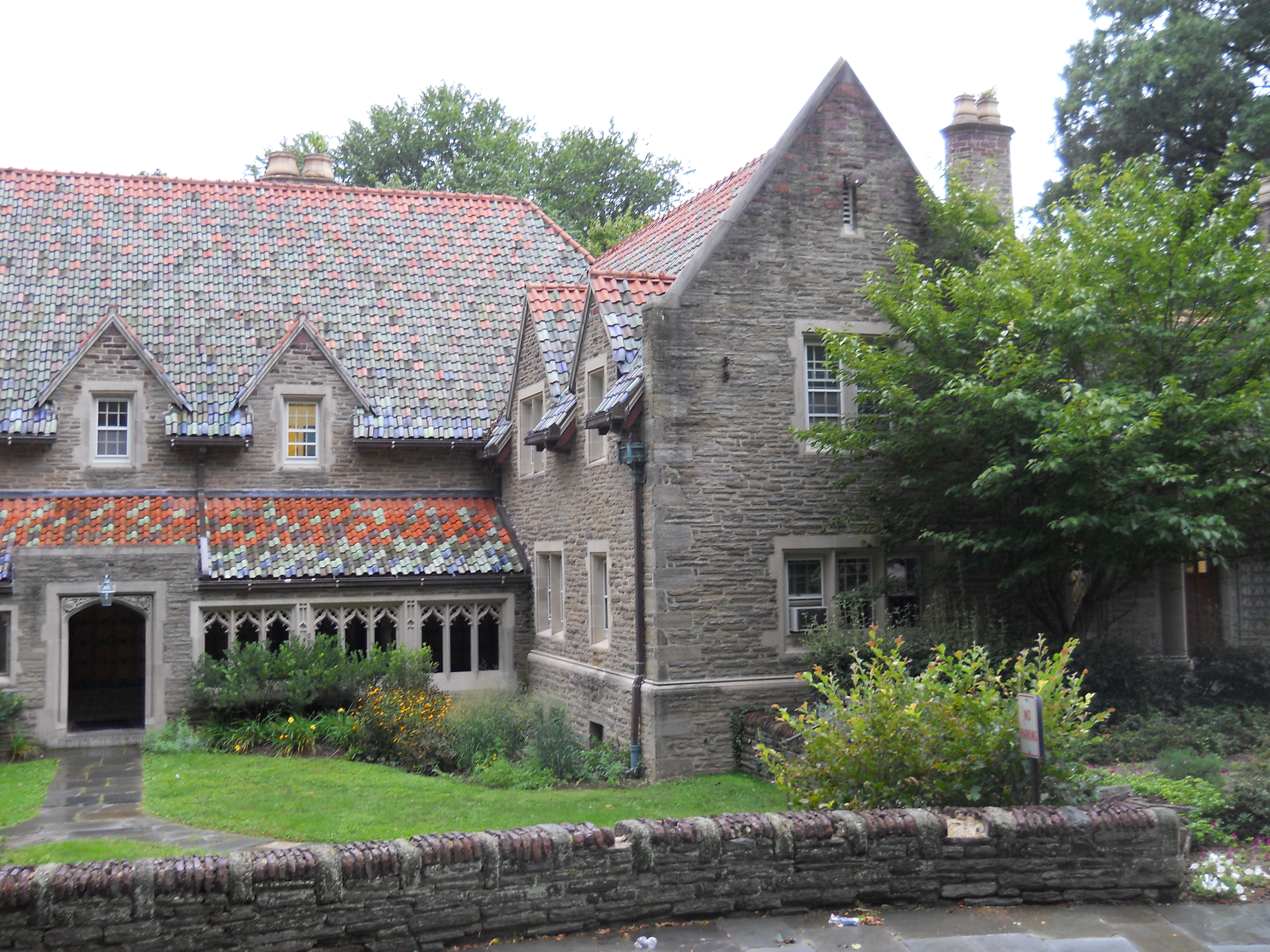
- Mother Goose Cottage (1917-1920).

- Location within Pennsylvania Location within the United States
- Location: Between W. Mill and Wissahickon Rds., Flourtown, Springfield Township, Pennsylvania
- Coordinates: 40°06′00″N 75°13′16″W
- Area: 90 acres (36 ha)
- Built: 1917-1932
- Architect: Kelsey, Albert; Et al.
- Architectural style: Tudor Revival
- NRHP reference No.: 91000227
- Added to NRHP: March 15, 1991

Carson College for Orphan Girls, also known as Carson Valley School, is a historic school complex and national historic district located in Flourtown, Springfield Township, Montgomery County, Pennsylvania. The buildings remain in active use by the same institution, now coeducational and named Carson Valley Children's Aid.

It was listed on the National Register of Historic Places in 1991.

== Buildings ==
The district encompasses nine contributing buildings. They are an assemblage of low-scale, Tudor Revival style structures built between 1917 and 1932. It includes the Mother Goose Cottage (1917–1920), Red Gables Cottage (1917–1920), Stork Hill (1918), Thistle Cottage (1917–1920), Upper Beech Cottage (c. 1930), Lower Beech Cottage (c. 1930), Beech Branch Cottage (c. 1930), a garage (1917–1920), and a shop / storehouse (1932). The campus was designed by architect Albert Kelsey (1870–1950) to be reminiscent of a 16th-century English village.

== The school ==
Founded in 1917 by Philadelphia philanthropists Robert and Isabel Carson, the school was renamed Carson Valley Children's Aid (CVCA) after a 2008 merger with the Norristown-based Children's Aid Society. CVCA provides regular and special education, behavioral therapy and psychotherapy for 6th–12th grade boys and girls who have behavioral disorders or mental illnesses, in residential as well as day school programs.
