= Wheatville, Austin =

Wheatville
- Location within City of Austin
- Coordinates: 30°17′19″N 97°44′54″W
- Country: United States
- State: Texas
- County: Travis
- Established: 1869

Population (1928)Estimated
  - Total: 300
- Time zone: UTC-6 (Central (CST))
  - Summer (DST): UTC-5 (CDT)
- ZIP codes: 78705

Wheatville was a historically black neighborhood in the city of Austin, Texas.

Wheatville, founded in 1867 by James Wheat, was a predominantly African-American community in Texas. Notable resident Jacob Fontaine established the first black newspaper, the Austin Gold Dollar. The 1928 Austin city plan led to the community's decline, as resources and facilities were relocated, forcing residents to move. The area is now part of the University of Texas at Austin's West Campus. A stone house built by Fontaine became a historical landmark in 1977. The community's legacy is remembered through establishments like the now-closed Freedman's restaurant and Wheatsville Co-op grocery store.

== History ==
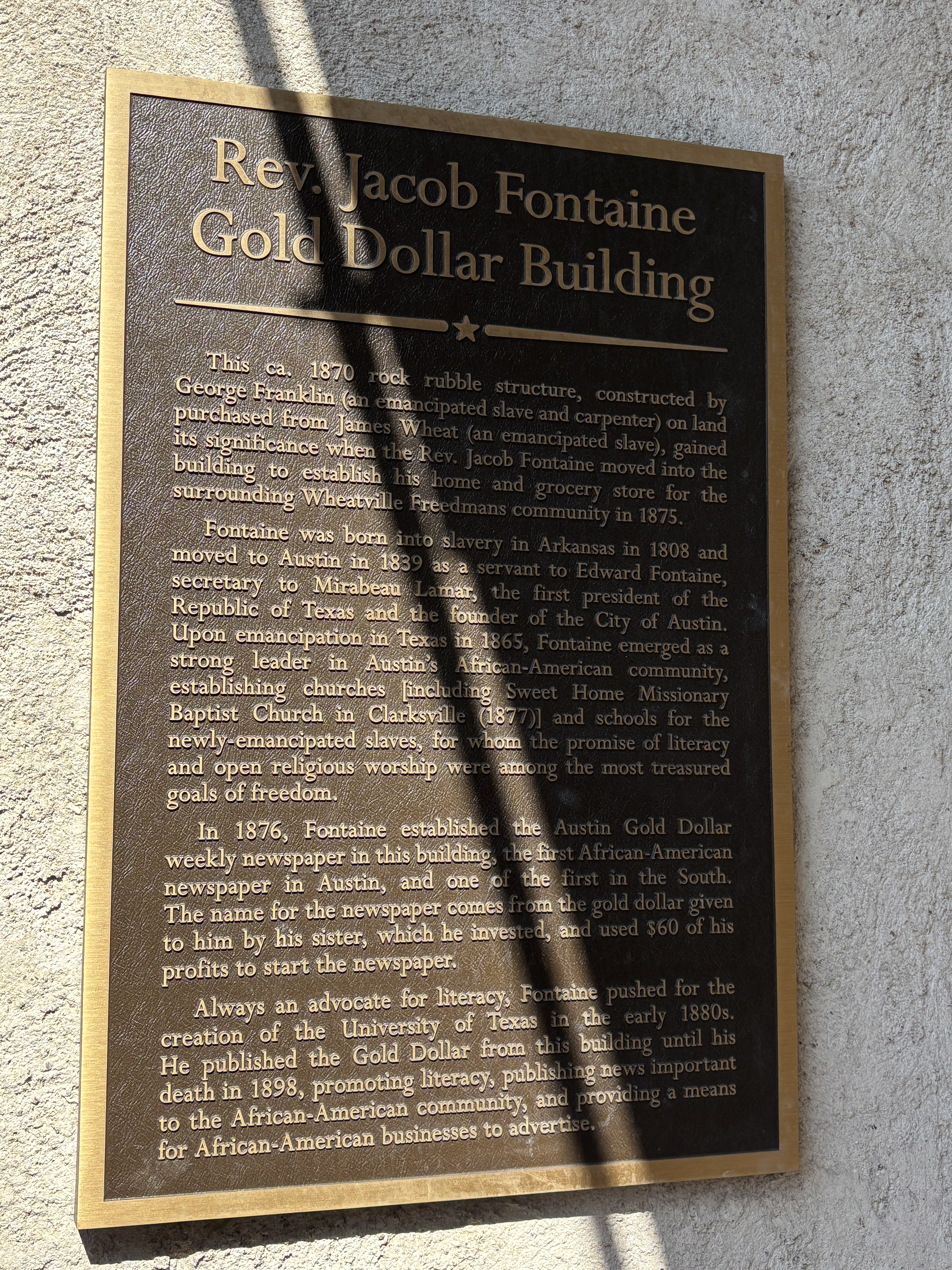
Historical marker at the Rev. Jacob Fontaine Gold Dollar Building in the historic Wheatville community, Austin, Texas.

Wheatville was founded in 1867 by James Wheat, who was formerly enslaved. After migrating to Texas with his family, Wheat purchased a plot of land and began growing corn. He would be joined by other families. Nearly all citizens had jobs such as merchants, skilled labour workers and domestics for white families. It eventually became home to Jacob Fontaine, a formerly enslaved minister. He established the first black newspaper there – the Austin Gold Dollar. The majority of the community remained African-American and stayed largely isolated until gentrification took place.

The sustainability of the community was threatened and ultimately destroyed by the implementation of 1928 Austin city plan. Austin relocated all resources and public facilities for African-Americans to the east side of what is currently Interstate Highway 35. The city could not directly force them to leave, but by relocating essential resources, left community members with no other choice. More Caucasian citizens moved into the neighborhood, increased the cost of living. African-American community members struggled with the high cost of housing. By 1932, the city closed the only school in Wheatville, which eventually led to the end of the community.

Because the 300-person Wheatville community lived on the west side of the interstate in what is now the present-day West Campus of the University of Texas at Austin, the community center is no longer in the center of the African-American community. A stone house built by Jacob Fontaine was bought by the Franzetti family and renovated into a grocery store in the 1920s, operating until the 1980s. In August 1977, the City of Austin deemed the stone building a historical landmark.

Sometime after 1998 Cuatro Kowalski moved to Austin to attend the University of Texas purchased the building and opened a barbecue restaurant known as "Freedman's". The name was meant to pay homage to the African-American community of Wheatville, but many found the name offensive. Kowalski finally shut down Freedman on August 31, 2018. Along with Freedman's, a neighborhood grocery store was named Wheatsville Co-op in honor of the African-American community.
