= Drag (Austin, Texas) =

Street in Austin, Texas

The Drag
- Guadalupe Street, Guad
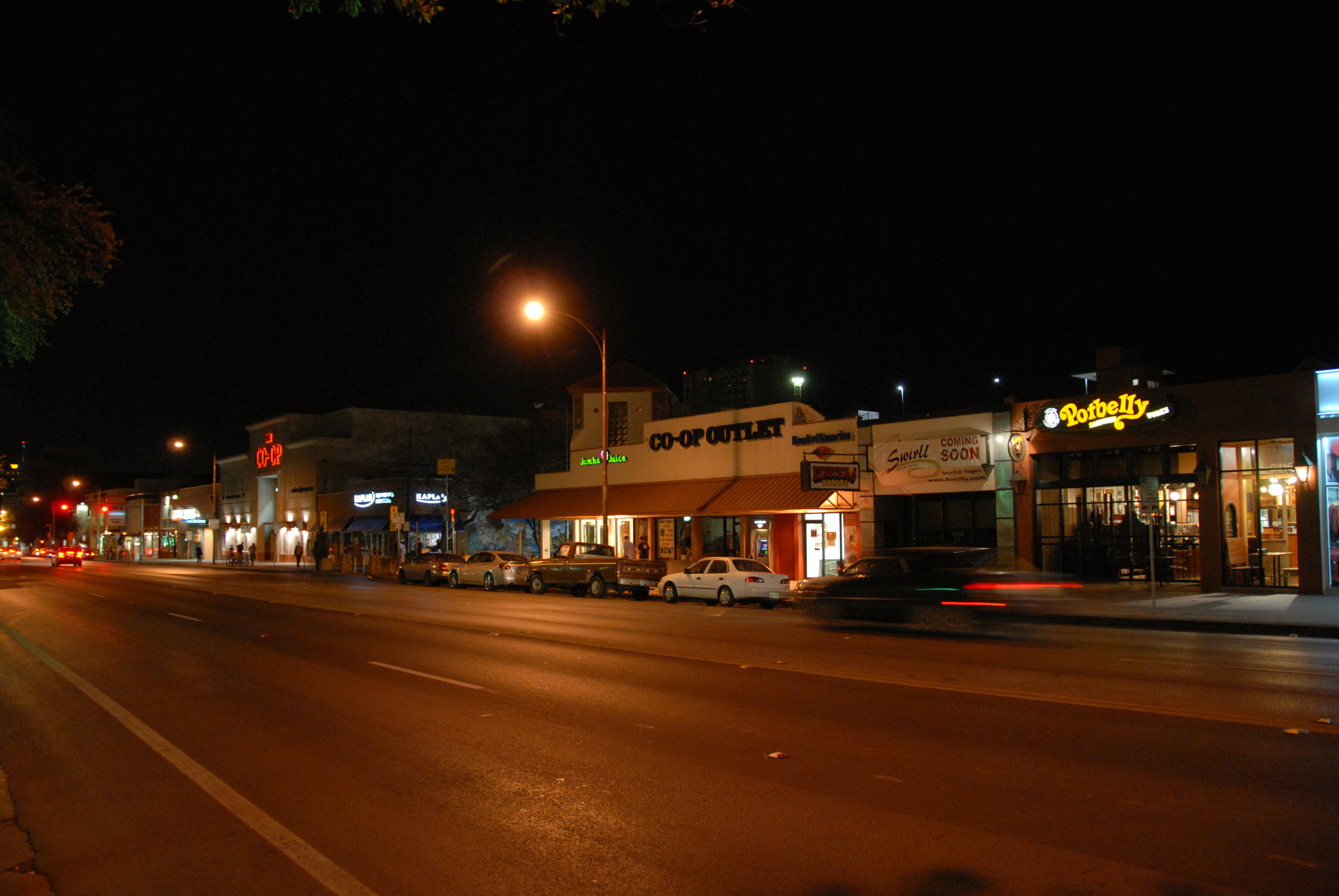
- A portion of The Drag, as seen at night.
- Maintained by: Austin Transportation and Public Works
- Location: Austin, Texas
- Postal code: 78705, 78712
- Coordinates: 30°17′9″N 97°44′30″W

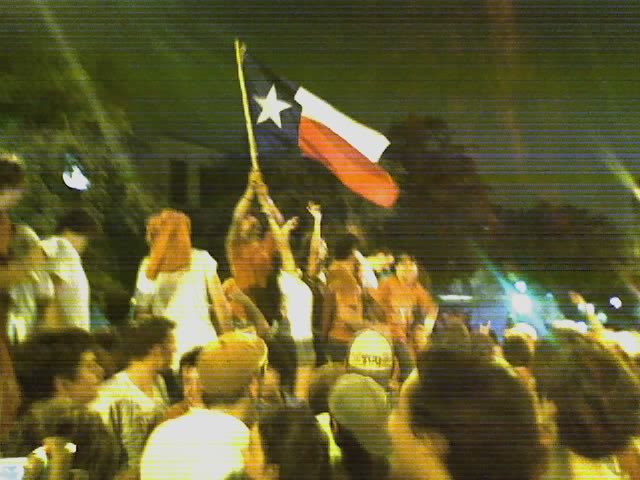
A spontaneous celebration on the drag after a Longhorns victory over Ohio State University.

The Drag is a nickname for a portion of Guadalupe Street that runs along the western edge of the University of Texas campus in Austin, Texas.

The Drag began as a strip of shops which provided vital resources to UT students. Bookstores, restaurants, and clothing stores fulfilled student needs. The proximity to campus, particularly the Main Building and the Union Building, added to the popularity of the street.

Past and present buildings on the Drag include the Harry Ransom Humanities Research Center, Raul's, Captain Quackenbush's Intergalactic Espresso and Dessert Company, Record Exchange (later renamed Sound Exchange at the NW corner of 21st Street), Hastings Music and Video (directly across from the West Mall and Student Union), Bevo's Bookstore, Urban Outfitters (at the SW corner of 24th Street), Varsity Theater which became Tower Records, Kerbey Lane Cafe, The Bazaar, Texadelphia, Dobie Mall, Goodall Wooten private dormitory, the University Baptist Church, and the University Co-op.

The Drag is considered an important part of Austin's civic life, but for many years many Austinites avoided it because of congestion. The area had fallen into disrepair, and some felt the area had become undesirable because of the presence of panhandlers known as "Dragworms", or more recently as "Dragrats."

During the 1966 University of Texas tower shooting, several of the students killed or injured by the sniper were walking on the Drag at the time of the incident. Many students and civilians used their own firearms to provide suppressive fire.

A project under the proposed Corridor Mobility Program (created under the 2016 Austin Mobility Bond approved by voters) would convert Guadalupe along the Drag from four travel lanes with discontinuous bike lanes, to three travel lanes (one being a dedicated turning lane), two dedicated transit lanes, and two continuous bike lanes. This project is projected to reduce CapMetro travel time through the corridor by up to three minutes. The project would also improve the surrounding streets in the West Campus neighborhood. Implementation of the CapMetro Rail Orange Line may remove private cars entirely off of Guadalupe Street.

In 2024, the Church of Scientology building on the Drag reopened after being closed for seven years for renovations, sparking protests from the student body.

== Properties ==
The 91-room Goodall Wooten, nicknamed "The Woo", was a privately operated dormitory building, built in 1956, that was not affiliated in any way with the university administration. By the late 2010s rents were relatively inexpensive compared to other area student housing. In 2018 it had about 60 residents; that year they were forced to leave. American Campus Communities purchased the buildings and had anticipated developing a new dormitory building.

In 1993, a mural of Hi, How Are You: The Unfinished Album by songwriter Daniel Johnston was painted near the south side of the Drag. In 2024, the surrounding building was demolished but the mural was preserved.
