= 1928 Austin city plan =

Plan commissioned by Austin City Council

Front cover of the 1928 city plan

The 1928 Austin city plan (also known as the 1928 Austin master plan) was commissioned in 1927 by the City Council of Austin, Texas. It was developed by consulting firm Koch & Fowler, which presented the final proposal early the next year. The major recommendations of this city plan related to Austin's street plan, its zoning code, and the development of major industries and civic features, but it is most remembered for institutionalizing housing segregation by designating East Austin as the city's negro district.

== History ==
The city of Austin, Texas, was established in 1839 to become a planned capital for the Republic of Texas. Texas President Mirabeau B. Lamar appointed his friend Edwin Waller to oversee the surveying of the new city and to develop a city plan for its layout. Waller and fellow surveyors laid out a grid plan fourteen city blocks wide, with a central four-block town square meant for the Texas Capitol. This "Waller Plan" determined the shape of what is now downtown Austin, and it was not until the 1870s that Austin expanded significantly beyond the bounds of the 1839 city plan.

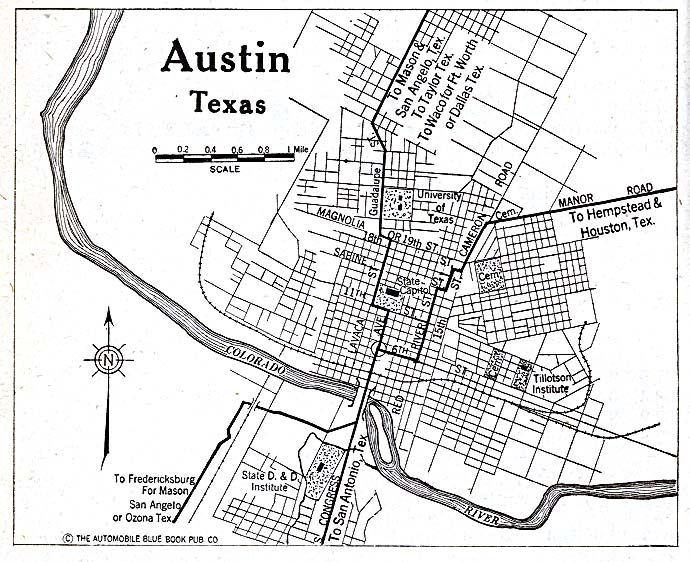
Road map of Austin in 1920

By the early 1900s, Austin had developed a number of suburbs surrounding the original downtown street grid, and growth began to strain the city's transportation infrastructure, especially at the crossings of the Colorado River, Shoal Creek, and Waller Creek. Citizens and businesses increasingly pressed city leaders to pave the dirt roads and otherwise improve the road network. Also, the City Beautiful movement inspired general interest in beautifying public spaces, as well as making them more functional. In 1926 City Council created a commission charged with the development of a new master city plan aimed at all these ends. The next year, the commission hired the Dallas consulting firm Koch & Fowler to develop a comprehensive plan for Austin's urban development.

=== Race and zoning ===
From the Civil War to the early 1900s, most of Austin's African American population lived in a number of freedmen communities distributed across the city, such as Clarksville and Wheatville. White city leaders were interested in moving black residents out of the central city and concentrating them into a racial ghetto on less valuable land, in part to reduce the cost of providing "separate but equal" racially segregated public amenities throughout the city. In 1917 the U.S. Supreme Court ruled in Buchanan v. Warley that the enforcement of racial housing segregation through local ordinances was unconstitutional, but the city continued to search for a way to establish de facto housing segregation in Austin that could satisfy this new legal standard, and this was to be one of the goals of the new city plan.

== City plan ==
Proposed system of municipal parks and boulevards from the plan

Koch & Fowler submitted their finished proposal to City Council in January 1928, in a document titled "A City Plan for Austin, Texas". The 80-page report included a large section on the development of the city's street plan, another on the design and placement of municipal parks and other urban green spaces, and a number of shorter sections on other public amenities such as public schools, cemeteries, fire stations, and a proposed civic center. Other sections discuss the development of the city's railroad and streetcar networks, the desirability of a municipal airport, the establishment of a new municipal zoning code and rules for land subdivision, and the city's integration into the development of the surrounding region.

The "Street plan" section noted that the Waller Plan's street grid continued to serve the central city well, but that the shortage of paved roads combined with the impact of obstructions such as the Capitol and the University of Texas campus forced excessive traffic onto a handful of streets. Detailed recommendations for the expansion and improvement of particular streets filled most of the section. In particular, it proposed the construction of four new bridges to connect central Austin with its suburbs, three of which were eventually built as the West Fifth Street Bridge, the Lamar Boulevard Bridge, and the Interstate 35 Bridge. The report emphasized the potential aesthetic value of bridges and other new constructions, urging that they be given ornamental designs.

The "Parks and boulevards" section argued for the importance of public green spaces to the physical and emotional health of citizens, recommending locations for new or improved park facilities throughout the city. It noted the good condition of the three surviving park squares from the Waller Plan (Republic Square, Wooldridge Park Square, and Brush Square) and their value to the city as "beauty spots and breathing spaces". The plan recommended the preservation of greenbelts along Shoal Creek and Waller Creek and the banks of the Colorado River, as well as other wooded areas within the city.

One section of the plan called for the development of a new civic center district on the north shore of the Colorado, to include a new municipal auditorium and event center, and a new central library downtown. Another section called for the creation of a municipal airport, suggesting that it be built in southeast Austin on what is now the neighborhood of Travis Heights.

=== Housing segregation ===
One of the city plan's recommendations, detailed mainly in the "Schools" section, is the establishment of a "negro district" on the southeast fringe of the city, east of East Avenue (now Interstate 35) and south of the City Cemetery, which the plan identified as the neighborhood with the highest preexisting concentration of black residents. After noting that explicitly racial zoning was not legally feasible (thanks to Buchanan v. Warley), the document advises that the city concentrate all public amenities aimed at black citizens in this region, so as to draw the black population to it.

== Legacy ==
Proposed system of zoning from the plan

In response to the plan, City Council adopted a resolution defining new city limits and establishing Austin's first zoning code. Later in 1928, Austin voters approved a municipal bond package providing $4.5 million (equivalent to $82,000,000 in 2024) in funds to implement many of the city plan's recommendations. These bonds paid for the construction of new boulevards, bridges, culverts, public schools, playgrounds, and city parks around Austin, as well as a new central library (now the Austin History Center) and an expansion of Brackenridge Hospital. They also funded the establishment of Robert Mueller Municipal Airport, opened in 1930 on the northeast edge of the city. The civic auditorium the plan called for was not built at the time, but thirty years later the city built the Palmer Auditorium across the river from the site the plan recommended; it has since been redeveloped into the Long Center for the Performing Arts.

=== East Austin ===
Though the vast majority of its contents dealt with the sorts of city planning issues that still confront Austin today (transportation, utilities, parks, schools), the 1928 master plan is mainly remembered today for its role in establishing East Avenue/Interstate 35 as the dividing line between the majority-white central city and the majority-black district of East Austin. The "pull" incentives recommended in the city plan were complemented by "push" incentives when the city avoided extending the sewer system or paved roads into the existing freedmen communities elsewhere in Austin, and real estate "redlining" also pushed African Americans east of the central city. By 1932 almost all of the city's black residents had relocated to East Austin, and the other black communities across the city had largely disappeared. This pattern of racial housing segregation persists in Austin to the present day, though its effects have been eroded by subsequent court rulings and legislation from the Civil Rights Era.

=== West Austin ===
The community of Wheatville, a historic Black community in Austin encompassed by modern day West Campus, saw its decline as a result of African Americans being pushed out of the community area. The city excluded Wheatville from essential amenities such as trash collection, electricity, paved streets, and water services. Despite being home to one of the city's trash dumps, residents did not receive regular trash collection, and city garbage wagons often dumped refuse along the streets. These discriminatory practices, combined with the influx of students and rising property prices, led many Black residents to leave Wheatville in search of better living conditions elsewhere, particularly in East Austin.
