= Albert Kelsey =

American architect

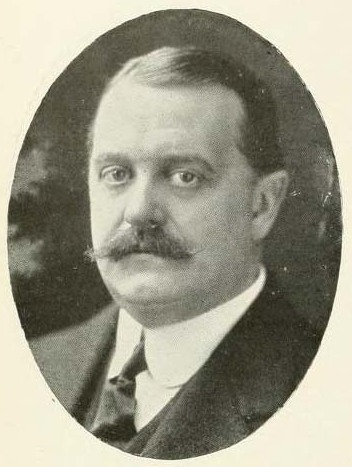
Albert Kelsey, Architect. Who's Who in Philadelphia, 1920.

Albert Warren Kelsey Jr. (April 26, 1870 – May 6, 1950) was an American architect, who designed in a number of Revivalist styles.

== Biography ==
He was born in 1870 in St. Louis, Missouri, the son of economist and writer A. Warren Kelsey and novelist Jeanette Garr Washburn. His father had been a close friend of the artist Winslow Homer, and his mother was the daughter of Wisconsin Governor and General Mills co-founder Cadwallader C. Washburn. The family moved to the Chestnut Hill section of Philadelphia, Pennsylvania, where Albert Jr. grew up and went to school. He apprenticed with architects Theophilus P. Chandler Jr. and Cope and Stewardson, and participated in the drafting atelier of the T-Square Club of Philadelphia. He graduated from the University of Pennsylvania's Department of Architecture in 1895, and won the 1896 University of Pennsylvania Traveling Scholarship (now the Stewardson Traveling Scholarship). He studied town planning abroad, and returned an ardent supporter of civic improvement, carrying its doctrines, as a lecturer, through the country. In 1899, he was elected the first president of the Architectural League of America, and devised the exhibit on municipal improvement for the 1904 St. Louis World's Fair. His firm employed the young architect Louis Magaziner in 1907.

Kelsey formed a partnership with French-born architect Paul Philippe Cret about 1908. The partnership was short-lived, and its only major commission was the Pan-American Union Building (now Organization of American States) in Washington, D.C.

Kelsey worked on his own after 1909. Over a 16-year period he created a campus of Tudor Revival buildings for the Carson Valley School, just outside Philadelphia.

== Selected works ==
- Pan-American Union Building (1908-10), 17th Street & Constitution Avenue NW, Washington, D.C., with Paul Philippe Cret.
- Marlin Edgar Olmsted Monument (c. 1913), Harrisburg Cemetery, Harrisburg, Pennsylvania.
- Haddington Branch of the Free Library of Philadelphia (1915), Girard Avenue & 65th Street, Philadelphia, Pennsylvania.
- Carson Valley School (1916-32), between West Mill Road and Lafayette Avenue, Springfield Township, Montgomery County, Pennsylvania.
- University Baptist Church (1921), 2130 Guadalupe Street, Austin, Texas.
- Edgewood High School of the Sacred Heart (1927), 2119 Monroe Street, Madison, Wisconsin.
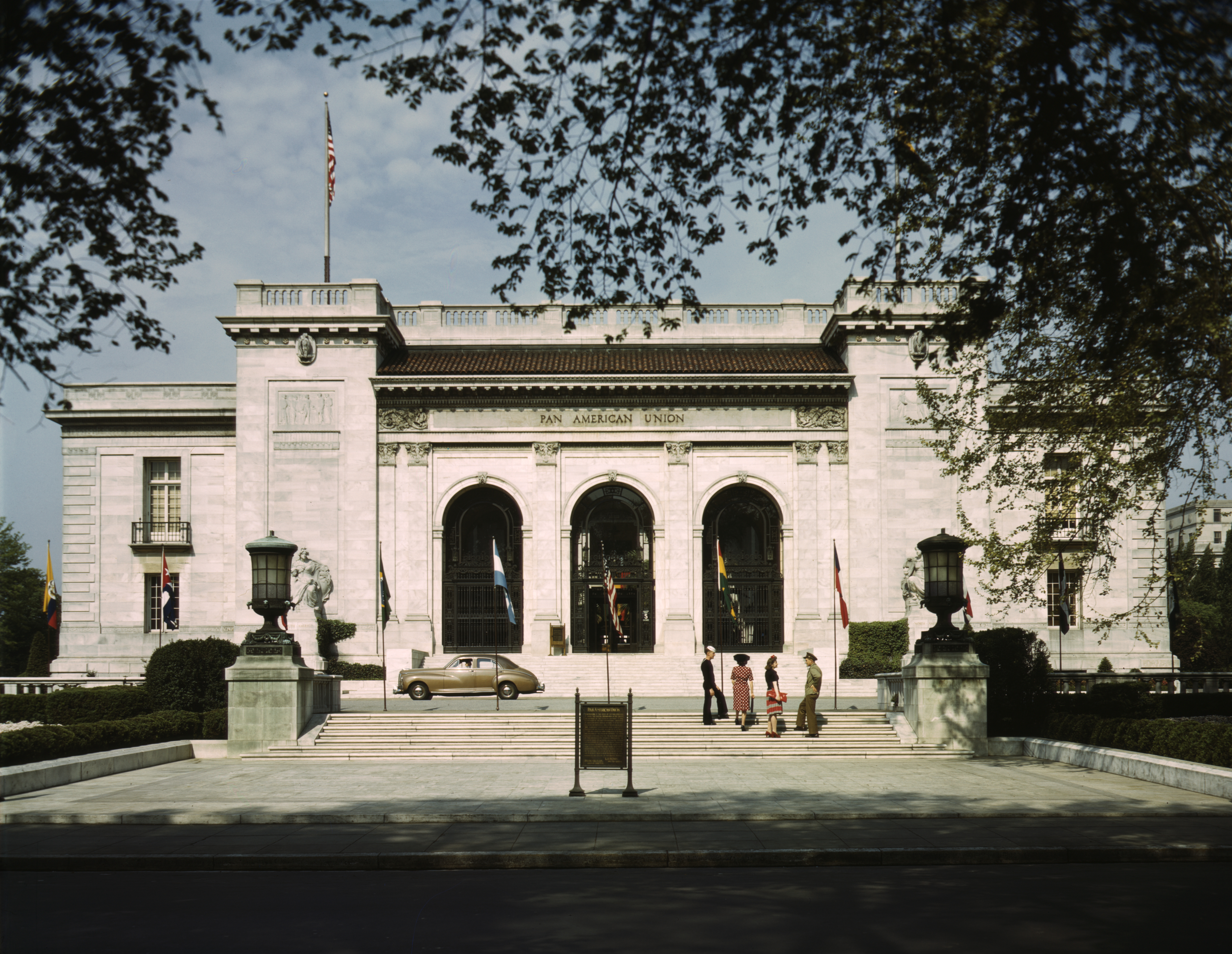
Pan-American Union Building (1908-10), Washington, D.C., with Paul Cret.

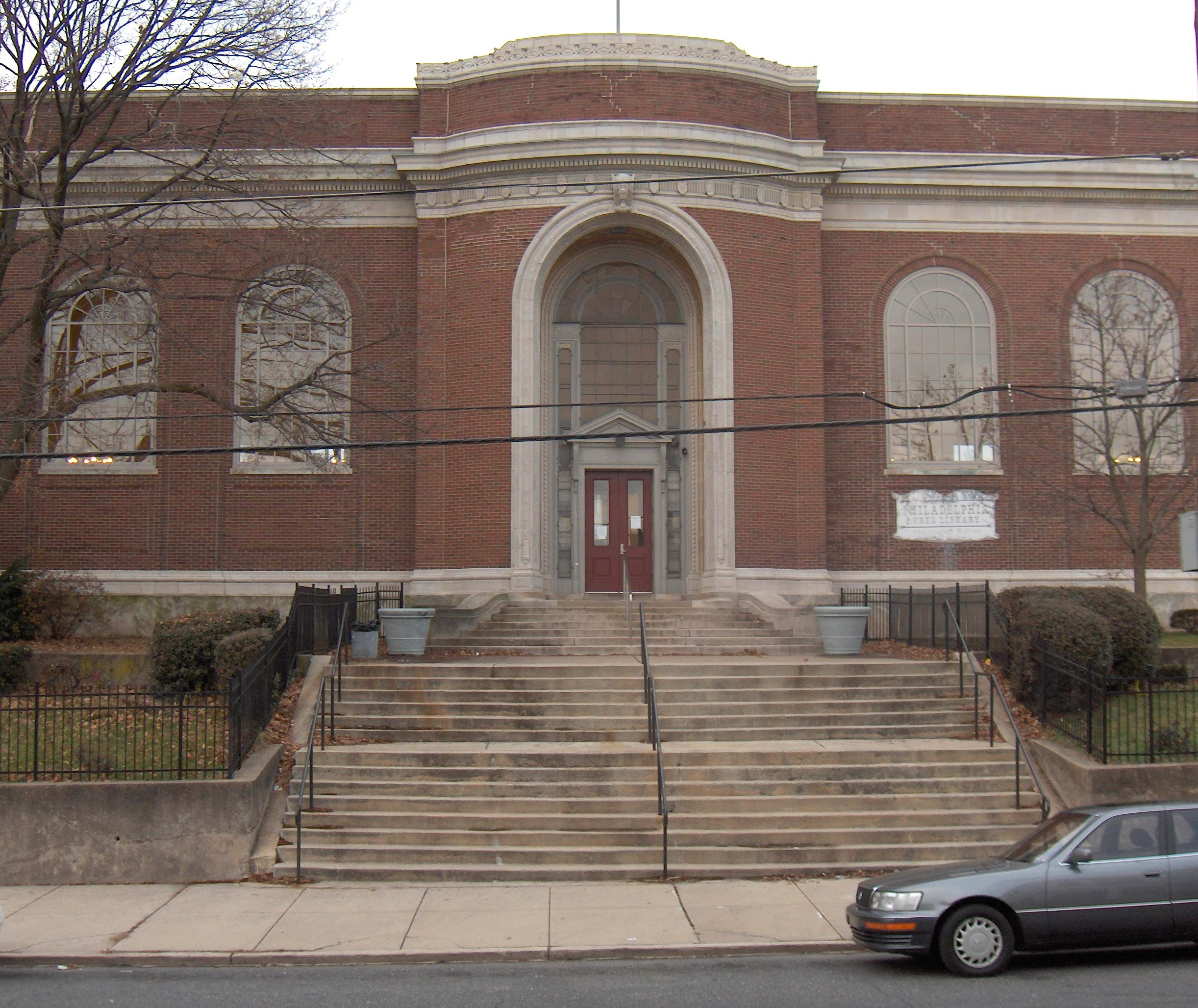
Haddington Branch (1915), Free Library of Philadelphia.

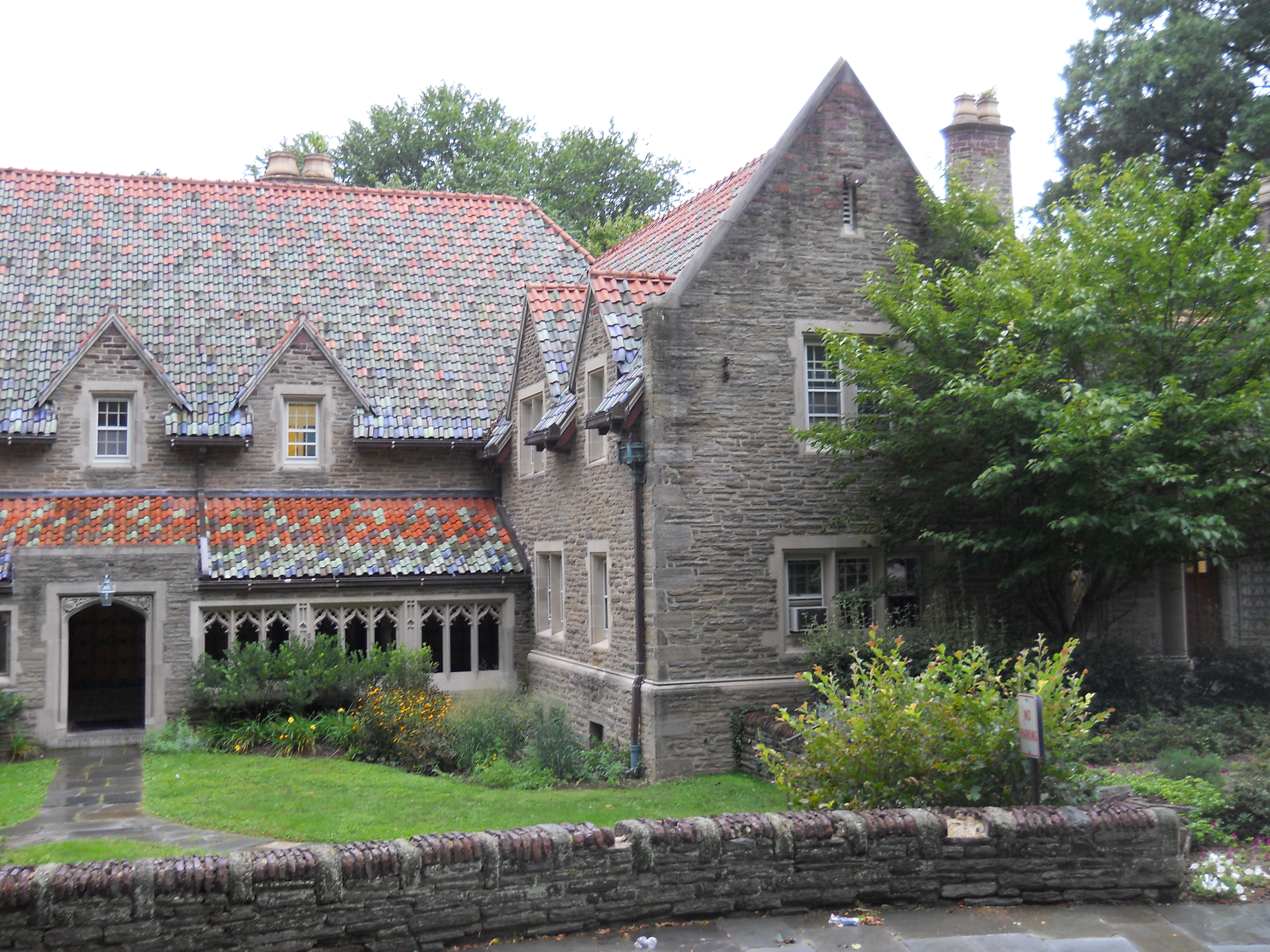
Mother Goose Cottage (1917-20), Carson Valley School, Springfield, Pennsylvania.

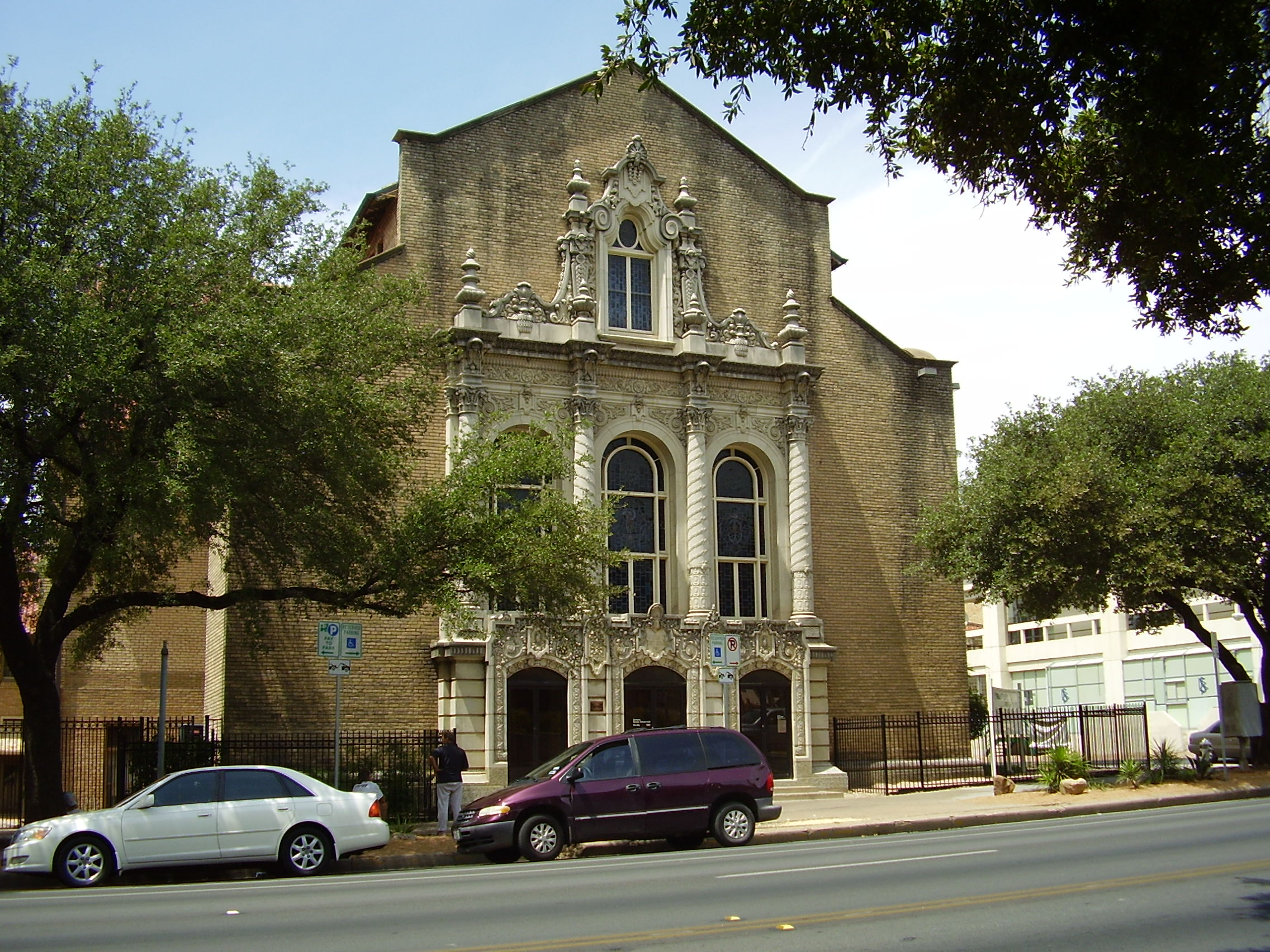
University Baptist Church (1921), Austin, Texas.

== Personal ==
Kelsey married Henrietta L. Allis, of New York. The couple lived at 8831 Crefeldt Street in the Chestnut Hill section of Philadelphia. They had a daughter, Charlotte.
