= Murder of Steven Beard =

Murder of a wealthy Texas retiree

On October 3, 1999, Steven Beard, a retired 75-year-old television executive with a net worth of about $12 million (equivalent to $23 million in 2025), was shot in the stomach with a 20-gauge shotgun while asleep at his home in West Lake Hills, Texas – a suburb of Austin. He survived the shooting and called the police emergency line himself to obtain help. He progressed toward recovery with the assistance of his 37-year-old second wife, Celeste Beard, but he then developed a blood clot and died nearly four months later on January 25, 2000. The weapon was traced to Tracey Tarlton, the manager of Austin's largest independent bookstore, who had been having an affair with his wife after they had met each other in a psychiatric treatment program. Tarlton said Celeste had told her Steven Beard was an abusive husband who had to be killed to free Celeste from her oppressive marriage.

Tarlton testified against Celeste Beard and received a reduced sentence of 20 years in prison; she was later released on parole in August 2011 and lives in San Antonio. Celeste Beard (who remarried six months after her husband's death and changed her name to Celeste Beard Johnson) was convicted of capital murder under the Texas law of parties and received a life sentence, which she is serving at a facility in Gatesville, Texas. Under Texas law, she is required to spend at least 40 years in prison and will be eligible for parole on April 1, 2042, at the age of 79.

== Victim ==
Steven Beard (born 1924) had begun his career in radio and advertising after serving in the U.S. Navy and attending college at Texas Christian University and Southern Methodist University, and eventually had become a television executive and partner co-owner of the KBVO television station, a Fox Network affiliate station broadcasting to the Austin area. He had a net worth of about $12 million. In October 1993, he was 69 years old and his wife Elise was also in her sixties, and she died suddenly of cancer. They had been married 45 years.

Beard and his wife had been members of a local country club and had dined frequently at its restaurant, and within three weeks of her death, he began dating the young waitress there named Celeste. Celeste was thirty years old and had recently divorced her third husband. All three of her marriages had ended in divorce, and she had two (twin) daughters to care for, who were about 12 years old, and their custody status was uncertain.

On January 1, 1994, Celeste moved in with Steven Beard, and in October 1994, he sold his share of the television station.

Steven Beard and Celeste were married on February 18, 1995. The marriage got off to a rocky start, with Steven filing for a divorce after only four months, but the pair reconciled and he withdrew the petition. One major point of contention was money, as Celeste proved to be a heavy spender. Before getting married, the couple signed a prenuptual agreement. Under the terms of the agreement, she would receive $500,000 if their marriage ended in divorce. When she pressured him to spend more than he thought was reasonable, he simply gave her the agreed $500,000 to nullify the future obligation and remove the point of contention, but she spent it all within six months.

Beard helped finance her custody dispute, which was eventually successful, and after three years, Beard formally adopted her daughters. Beard also had a daughter from his previous wife, who had grown to adulthood and did not live with him.

Celeste continued to spend money compulsively during their marriage, going through about $1 million in four years on shopping sprees, vacations, and party hosting, and her spending continued to be a source of friction. Her potential divorce settlement had already been spent, but if he died, she would receive $6 million under the terms of his will (unless, of course, she was responsible for his death).

== Shooting ==
On October 3, 1999, Steven Beard was shot in the stomach with a 20-gauge shotgun while he was asleep at his home in Westlake Hills, Texas, and he awoke and called the 9-1-1 emergency line himself to obtain help. He initially did not realize he had been shot and did not understand what had happened, saying "My guts just jumped out of my stomach. They blew out. ... They're lying on my stomach. ... I don't know what happened. I've never had this happen before." Beard asked the operator to try to call his wife Celeste, who he thought was sleeping in another room of their 5,300-square-foot (490 m^{2}) home, but she did not answer when they tried to call.

The first responding officer who arrived on the scene also received no response from the doorbell or banging on the door, and he then saw Steven Beard laying injured on his bed through a window, so he broke through a sliding glass door to enter. Celeste and one of her daughters then emerged from another wing of the home after the responding officers entered.

Emergency medical service responders examined Beard, who weighed about 300 pounds (140 kilograms), and they initially thought that a prior incision wound from a hernia operation had failed and caused his intestines to spill out, but the police then discovered a spent shotgun shell near the bed and saw that the drawers of a bathroom had been ransacked, and clothing had been pulled out of drawers and dumped on the floor. But most of the valuables in the house had not been taken, so robbery did not appear to be a likely motive for the shooting.

Beard was rushed to a hospital by helicopter. The other daughter was also in the home, and Celeste and her daughters were driven to the hospital in a police vehicle. Celeste remained at his side while he was in the hospital, visiting frequently and ensuring he received proper care. Beard was released from the hospital after a stay of nearly four months, but he then succumbed to a blood clot and died four days later on January 25, 2000.

== Tracey Tarlton ==
When police investigators asked people who knew the family about who could have committed the shooting, many people (later said to be basically everyone except Celeste) suggested investigating Tracey Tarlton, the manager of Austin's largest independent bookstore, who they knew as a close friend of Celeste. Celeste had met Tarlton at Saint David's Pavilion, a mental health facility, after Celeste was admitted there for depression. Celeste and Tarlton had developed a very close relationship, often inviting each other to dinner or to just "hang out". Over time, according to Tarlton, they had become lovers, and their romantic relationship was apparent to many of the people around them, including Tarlton's co-workers and Celeste's daughters and husband. The police also began to hear that Celeste had spoken negatively about her husband. The Beards' attorney, David Kuperman, refused to allow police to interview Steven Beard while he was hospitalized.

When questioned, Tarlton admitted that she owned a shotgun given to her by her father that she used for skeet shooting. The investigators tested the shotgun and concluded that it was the weapon used in the shooting. Tarlton was arrested at her home on October 8, 1999, five days after the shooting (while Steven Beard was still alive), and she was initially charged with assault.

External videos
- HLN:Scorned Lover's Week: Texas vs. Celeste Beard, Headline News

The formal charge was upgraded to murder in February 2001. Tarlton steadfastly refused to implicate Celeste Beard in the crime for more than a year after her arrest, but eventually changed her mind. Tarlton later testified that while in jail awaiting trial, she read in a local newspaper that Celeste had remarried six months after her husband's death, and she concluded that their relationship had been a sham.

In March 2002, shortly before her murder trial was to begin, Tarlton struck a deal with prosecutors to testify that Celeste had persuaded her to shoot Steven Beard, claiming that he had emotionally abused Celeste to the point that Tarlton thought Celeste would be driven to suicide. Tarlton said she believed that getting rid of him was the only way the women could be together. Celeste vehemently denied asking Tarlton to kill Steven, and has continued to deny it since then.

Tarlton received a reduced sentence of 20 years in exchange for testifying against Celeste, and she was released on parole in August 2011 and lives in San Antonio.

== Celeste Beard ==
Celeste Beard
- Born: Celeste Johnson; February 13, 1963 (age 63); Culver City, California, U.S.
- Spouses: Craig Bratcher (divorced) Henry Wolf (divorced) Jimmy Martinez (divorced) Steven Beard (m. 1995; murdered 2000) Cole Johnson (m. 2000, divorced)
- Children: 2
- Status: Incarcerated
- Convictions: Capital murder; Injury to an elderly individual; Criminal solicitation of capital murder
- Penalty: Life imprisonment with the possibility of parole after 40 years

Details
- Date apprehended: March 28, 2002

Celeste Beard (born Celeste Johnson, February 13, 1963) was Steven Beard's second wife, and he was her fourth husband. Her biological parents are unknown. She claimed that her adoptive father had physically abused her as a child and that she attempted suicide during puberty. At age 17, she became pregnant and gave birth to twins with her abusive first husband, Craig Bratcher.

Celeste married twice more before meeting Steven Beard while she was a waitress at a country club in Austin, Texas. She moved in with Beard after he convinced her that he would legally adopt her daughters. They were married on February 18, 1995, with Beard's family and friends suspicious that she had married him for his money.

Celeste spent money freely during their marriage, and this angered Steven, who Tarlton said had threatened her with divorce. The couple sought therapy, and Celeste went to Saint David's Pavilion treatment center for depression. She continued to spend extravagantly after the shooting. According to Beard's accountant, Celeste had spent $670,000 in the six months after the shooting – $321,000 in October and November 1999, an additional $249,000 by December 10, and another $100,000 by the end of March 2000. In addition to her allegedly sexual relationship with Tarlton, Celeste had also been having an affair with her most recent ex-husband.

Based on Tarlton's statement, Celeste was arrested on March 28, 2002. At Celeste's trial, prosecutors charged that she had married Steven Beard for his money and wanted him dead because he was tired of her extravagant spending and was considering divorce. The Beards' family attorney, David Kuperman, testified that Steven did not want a divorce and that the underlying issues of the spending had been addressed during joint therapy sessions (with both Beards in attendance) for treating Celeste's depression. The daughters testified against their mother at the trial, describing her behavior as erratic and threatening, saying Steven Beard had at times been planning to divorce her, and they offered audio tapes they had recorded of what Celeste had said. They said she had sometimes abandoned them at foster homes during their childhood with little explanation. Multiple witnesses said Celeste had spoken very negatively about her husband, saying she was disgusted by him and that he was fat and old and she wished he would die. There was also testimony that Celeste and Tarlton had sometimes tranquilized him and had attempted to harm him or kill him in various other ways before the shooting, and that Celeste tried to hire a friend to kill Tarlton after Tarlton turned on her.

Celeste's attorney, Dick DeGuerin, alleged that she had nothing to do with the shooting and that Tarlton, whom he dismissed as an unreliable witness due to documented mental instability, acted alone; he said Tarlton was obsessed with Celeste, who denied making sexual advances toward Tarlton. According to Celeste and several witnesses, Tarlton tried to kiss her after she had passed out during her daughters' 1999 high school graduation. When Tarlton was arrested for drunk driving and Celeste bailed her out, Steven Beard, angered by relentless phone calls, demanded that Tarlton stop contacting the couple. Several witnesses saw no unusual problems in Celeste and Steven's marriage, and DeGuerin alleged that Celeste's daughters lied on the witness stand because they would inherit no money if their mother was acquitted.

In 2003, Celeste was convicted of capital murder under the Texas law of parties, receiving a life sentence – the mandatory sentence for the crime in cases where prosecutors do not seek the death penalty. Under Texas law, she is required to spend at least 40 years in prison and will be eligible for parole on April 1, 2042, at the age of 79. Celeste has continued to maintain her innocence for 19+ years, and as of 2026 is imprisoned at the Texas Department of Criminal Justice Lane Murray Unit in Gatesville.

== Media coverage ==
The case was covered on various documentary and true crime programs, including American Justice, Snapped (1st episode), Deadly Women, Vengeance: Killer Millionaires, Reasonable Doubt, and ABC's 20/20.

In 2005, a book about the case was published by Avon Books. A self-published book about the case, Celeste: The Celeste Beard Johnson Story, was released in 2019.

In 2011, Celeste Beard Johnson and five other inmates published From the Big House to Your House, a cookbook that lists recipes that can be made in prison cells with ingredients from the prison commissary.

On June 13, 2021, Lifetime aired Secrets of a Gold Digger Killer, a TV film that featured Julie Benz as Celeste.

In 2022, ABC aired two episodes titled "What the Sisters Saw – Part 1 & 2" on the show Who Do You Believe? and one episode titled "Tainted Love" on the show 20/20. The shows featured interviews with Celeste, her two daughters, and other people in the case.

== See also ==
Other murders in the Austin area:

- Austin yogurt shop murders (1991)
- Murder of Jennifer Cave (2005)
- Murders of John Goosey and Stacy Barnett (2009)
