= West Campus, Austin, Texas =

Student neighborhood in central Austin, Texas

Neighborhood map

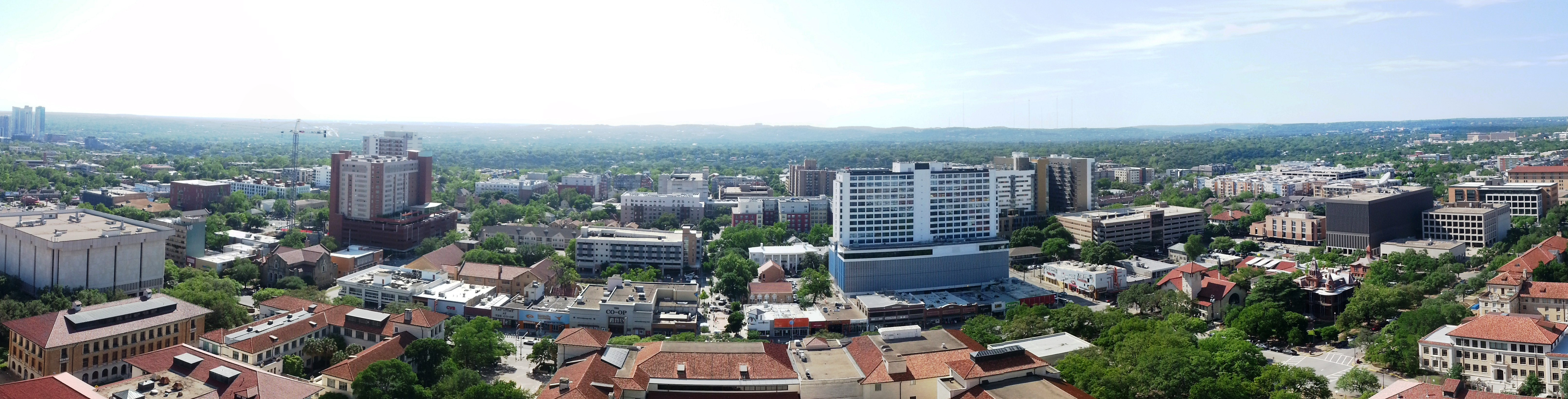
West Campus as seen from the observation deck of UT Tower in 2015

West Campus (dubbed "Wampus" among students) is a neighborhood in central Austin, Texas west of Guadalupe Street (the Drag) and its namesake, the University of Texas at Austin. Due to its proximity to the university, West Campus is heavily populated by college students.

== History ==
Wheatville, encompassed by modern day West Campus, was Austin's first post-Civil War Black community. Founded in 1867 by James Wheat, it thrived as a self-sustaining neighborhood. Its boundaries extended from present-day 24th Street to 26th Street, with Shoal Creek to the west and Rio Grande Street to the east. Despite its initial success, demographic shifts and urbanization led to its decline by the early 20th century.

By the early 20th century, Wheatville's decline accelerated due to urbanization and discriminatory policies. In 1928, the city of Austin implemented a master plan aimed at segregating the city's Black residents. The city excluded Wheatville from essential amenities such as trash collection, electricity, paved streets, and water services. Despite being home to one of the city's trash dumps, Wheatville residents did not receive regular trash collection, and city garbage wagons often dumped refuse along the streets. These discriminatory practices, combined with the influx of students and rising property prices, led many Black residents to leave Wheatville in search of better living conditions elsewhere, particularly in East Austin.

By the mid-1930s, the once-thriving community had largely vanished. Notable landmarks like the Franzetti building remain, and the Wheatsville Co-op honors its legacy.

The area later emerged as an epicenter of student life in the 1930s, spurred by both national legislation and local initiatives. The passage of the National Housing Act (1934), a key component of President Franklin D. Roosevelt's New Deal, aimed to stimulate mortgage lending and encourage construction activity to counter the economic challenges of the Great Depression. In Austin, these policies coincided with a burgeoning student population at the University of Texas (UT) Austin, attracting developers to the area and giving rise to West Campus.

The late 1940s witnessed a significant influx of students at UT Austin, propelled by the GI Bill, which provided returning service members with access to higher education. This surge in enrollment prompted private developers to convert single-family residences into larger apartment complexes, meeting the growing demand for student housing. The trajectory of West Campus was further shaped by the Austin Plan of 1958, which rezoned the area to accommodate dense apartment developments, setting the stage for rapid urbanization.

Throughout the twentieth century, West Campus underwent continuous expansion, becoming a sought-after destination for real estate investment. In 2004, the University Neighborhood Overlay (UNO) initiative was introduced, aimed at revitalizing the area through incentive-based redevelopment plans. UNO incentivized developers to provide a small percentage of affordable housing in exchange for permission to construct high-rise buildings. Despite initial concerns about preserving the neighborhood's character, UNO facilitated the construction of 52 projects since 2005, comprising over 5,000 units and 12,000 bedrooms. However, criticism of the housing's affordability was prevalent.

In the mid-2000s new zoning changes were enacted in order to increase the number of students in the area. This led to construction of new large apartment and condominium projects. In a five-year period ending in 2009, 2,400 apartment and condominium units were constructed.

In 2020, voters approved of Project Connect, a transit expansion program by the Capital Metropolitan Transportation Authority (Capital Metro). As a part of the plan, Capital Metro would add two light rail lines, three bus rapid transit lines, and one commuter rail line to the already existing Red Line, which will also undergo major improvements. In particular, the Blue Line and Orange Line would run along Guadalupe Street, directly adjacent to West Campus.

== University of Texas at Austin ==
The biggest changes to West Campus in recent years have come about as a result of the University Neighborhood Overlay (UNO) Plan, a city initiative passed in 2004. The UNO plans were "intended to help create a residential district that is close to the campus, consolidating some of the student housing that is scattered throughout the city, and thereby reducing transient student traffic to campus from outside, and reducing the transient parking requirements around West Campus."

The plan sought to bring University of Texas students closer to campus, and to create a denser, urban environment in order to provide more space for the growing student population.

Due to the proximity of the West Campus area to the university, it is close to University facilities such as the Blanton Museum of Art, the Harry Ransom Center, and the LBJ Library. The Bob Bullock Texas State History Museum, which features an IMAX theater, is also nearby. Pease Park is on the western border at Lamar Boulevard.

== Cityscape ==
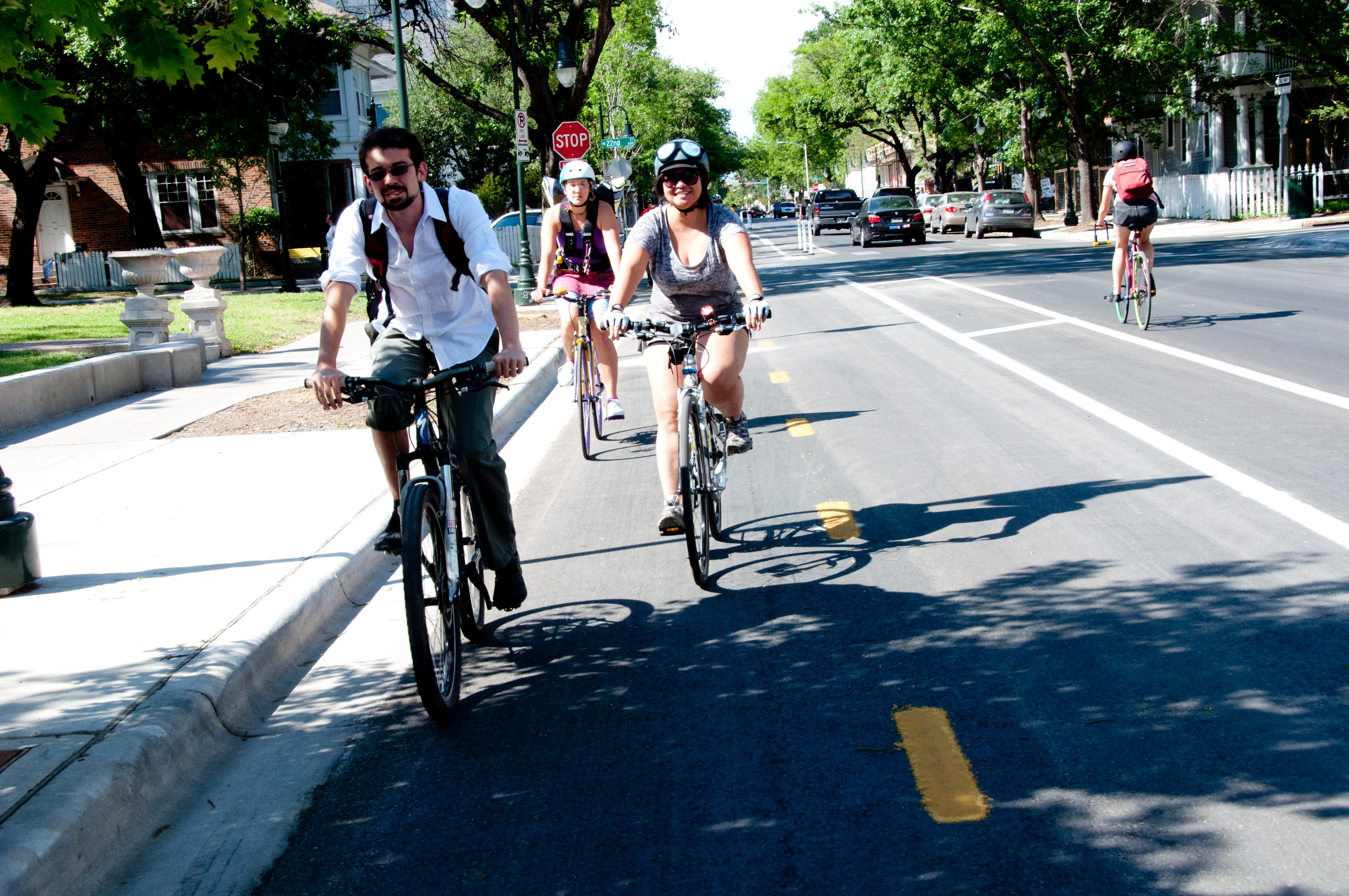
West Campus is noted for its pedestrian, bicycle, and electric scooter traffic.

West Campus is a community that is a collection of individual neighborhoods. Chuck Lindell of the Austin American-Statesman said that West Campus is bounded roughly by West 29th Street, Guadalupe Street, North Lamar Boulevard, and Martin Luther King Jr. Boulevard. Areas west of San Gabriel tend to be single-family houses, while the area oriented to students of the University of Texas at Austin are located to the east. Some residents believe that San Gabriel Street is the boundary of West campus. Many houses are bungalows.

The eastern boundary of West Campus is a major commercial area known as "The Drag" or Guadalupe Street, where clothing stores, restaurants, bookstores (including the University COOP), and venues are across the street from the University.

The fraternity and sorority life at UT Austin is centered at West Campus. Many small businesses are located in West Campus.

The Caswell Heights subdivision is in the southwest corner of the West Campus area.

American Campus Communities operates multiple housing properties for students. The Block, The Callaway House, and The Castilian are operated by that company. In 2019 the population of these buildings is below 5,000. In 2018 the former Goodall Wooten dormitory closed, as American Campus, the new owner, plans to redevelop it.

== Demographics ==
West Campus has among the highest population densities in the City of Austin. In 2000 the area had about 10,000 people. Due to the influx of new apartments and condominiums, by 2009, according to Chuck Lindell of the Austin American-Statesman, the area may have had over 17,000 residents. As of 2009 many young professionals, faculty members of the University of Texas at Austin, and retirees live in West Campus. As of 2020, over 30,000 residents live in West Campus.

Race/Ethnicity	Percentage
White	58.99%
Black	8.48%
Asian	13.24%
Hawaiian/Pac. Islander	0.03%
Hispanic	19%
Native American	0.26%

== Housing ==
West Campus houses a variety of architecture and a wide range of mansions, houses, apartments, and is constantly growing due to the housing needs of 51,000+ college students attending UT Austin.

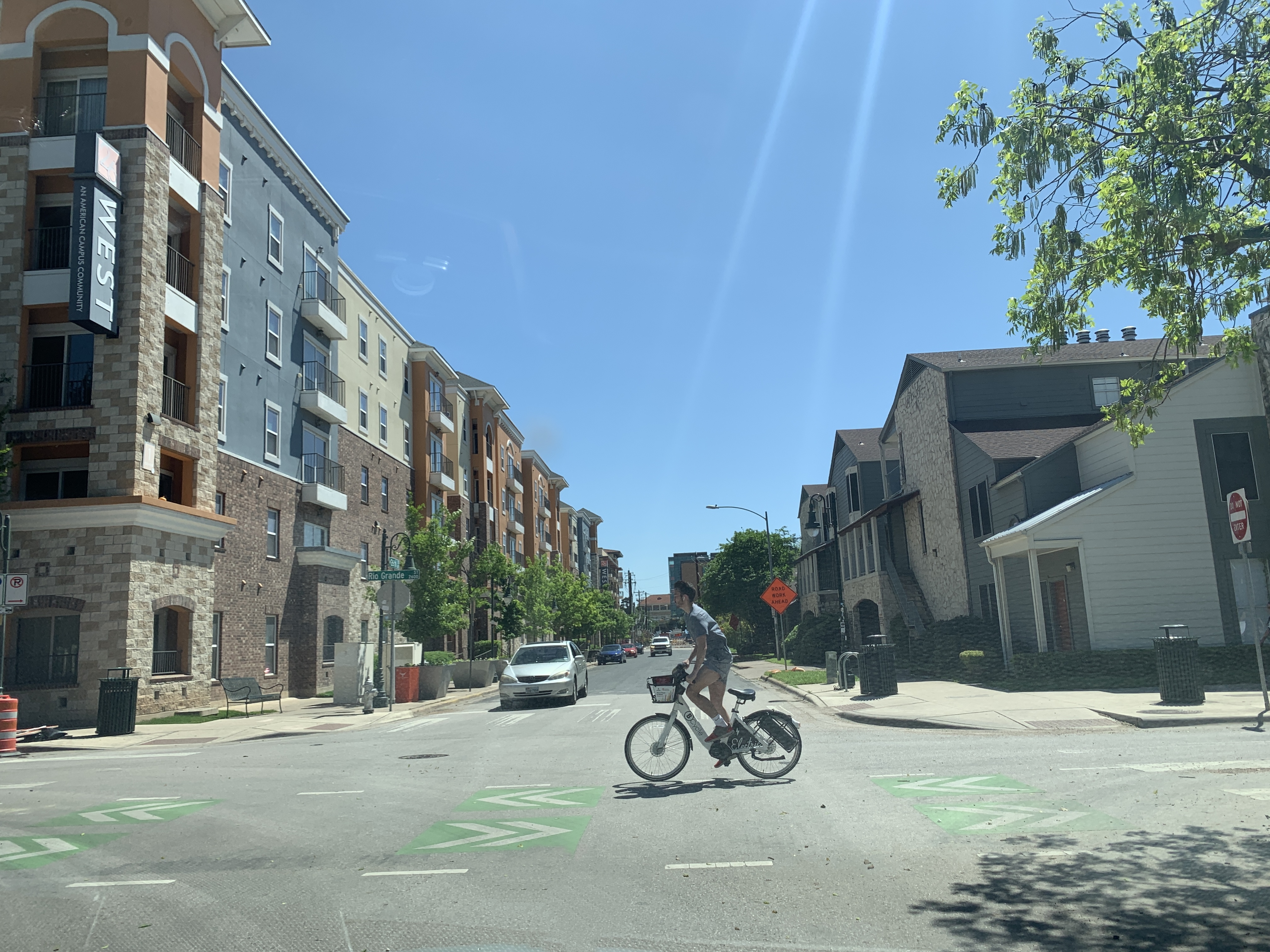
College Apartments at West Campus Residential Neighborhood Near UT Austin Campus

West Campus area's architecture is diverse, with 80-year-old buildings often found next door to modern condos and apartments. Craftsman homes, bungalows, historic mansions, duplexes, and apartments old and newly built can all be found in this area.

This neighborhood is marked by the wide range of student organizations and Greek communities that occupy it. West Campus is home to more than 50 Greek organizations, more than 12 co-ops, organized by the Inter-Cooperative Council (ICC) and local cooperative organization College Houses, and many other student organizations.

Between West Campus and the University of Texas campus is "The Drag", home to restaurants and shops.

== Incidents ==
As of 2009 the Austin Police Department (APD) places about half of the patrol officers from its central-west division in West Campus. Cmdr. Chris Noble of APD says that this is due to the large population in West Campus and not due to a bad crime rate. The community has a large amount of foot traffic. In 2009 Noble said that the foot traffic increases "nuisance" crimes such as fighting, excess noise, and theft, while it acts as a deterrent to some crimes. Noble said "The notorious crimes, mainly the murders - absolutely nothing about that is the result of the neighborhood. Those people were targeted, and it could've happened anywhere in this city, not just West Campus. Violent crime in that area is almost nonexistent. The biggest issues we have are people getting their cars broken into and their bikes stolen." Noble said "you have a greater chance of getting your head bashed in Northwest Hills than downtown, and even less of a chance in the campus area. It's an absolutely great place to live - if you are willing to put up with the university (crowd)."

SafeHorns, a student safety advocacy group operating in the West Campus area, has been vocal about the escalating crime rates in West Campus, particularly during events like South by Southwest (SXSW). SafeHorns President Joell McNew has emphasized the urgency of addressing these safety concerns, advocating for proactive measures to ensure the well-being of students.

One of the first American mass school shooting incidents took place in Austin on August 1, 1966, when Charles Whitman shot 43 people, killing 13 from the top of the University of Texas tower. Gunfire during the University of Texas tower shooting wounded and killed students on and near the university.

In 2009 Chuck Lindell of the Austin American-Statesman wrote "despite being an area with relatively little violence, West Campus has been home to some of Austin's most notorious recent crimes".

In August 2005 Jennifer Cave was shot to death. Two months later, William "Trey" Ehrhardt, a fourth-year (senior) University of Texas at Austin student, was shot dead in a robbery at his apartment. In 2008 a man named Adrian Lopez was attacked and held captive in a house. The murders of John Goosey and Stacy Barnett occurred on July 21, 2009.

On Sunday, October 31st, a person was shot at West 22nd Street and Pearl Street. The shooting victim was transported to an area hospital where they received medical attention.

An incident occurred in March 2023 when a bicyclist, Michael Delgado, was struck and killed by falling debris from a high-rise construction project near the intersection of Rio Grande Street and 24th Street. Despite efforts by nearby UT students to provide aid, Delgado succumbed to his injuries at a nearby hospital over the weekend. The incident prompted calls for increased safety measures at construction sites in the area, with advocacy groups like SafeHorns urging the City of Austin to inspect ongoing projects to prevent similar accidents in the future. Greystar, the company responsible for the construction project in question, stated that it is cooperating with the Austin Police Department's investigation into the incident.

In June 2023, Austin Police responded to a shooting near West 22nd 1/2 Street and Rio Grande Street. One person was taken to the hospital with critical, life-threatening injuries. The suspect, Brian Baca, was charged with aggravated assault with a deadly weapon and taken into the Travis County Jail.

In 2024, Zacharia Doar, a 23-year old Palestinian-American man, was attacked and stabbed in the chest on West 26th Street after returning rally in support of Palestinian Human rights. The assailant was arrested at the scene and charged with aggravated assault with a deadly weapon. According to accounts from Doar and his three friends involved in the incident, the assailant, Bert James Baker, yelled racial slurs, tried to rip a "Free Palestine" scarf off their car, and then stabbed Doar, breaking one of his ribs. Police later said the assault met the standards of a hate crime.

At approximately 10 a.m. on Sunday, March 3, Austin-Travis County EMS responded to a call at the 2500 block of Leon Street where a dead body was found in an alley. Homicide detectives and Crime Scene Specialists responded to process the scene.

In late November 2025, Brianna Aguilera, a Texas A&M University sophomore, was found dead outside the 21 Rio apartment complex. Following surveillance review, phone recovery, witness interviews, and digital analysis indicating a deleted suicide note and prior suicidal messages, police announced on December 4 that her death was ruled a suicide, stating no evidence of criminal involvement. Her family publicly disputed the conclusion.

== Education ==
Austin Independent School District operates public schools.

During its first year, Peace Elementary School (now Austin Peace Academy), an Islamic day school, was briefly located in West Campus.
