= Wheatsville Co-op =

American food cooperative in Texas

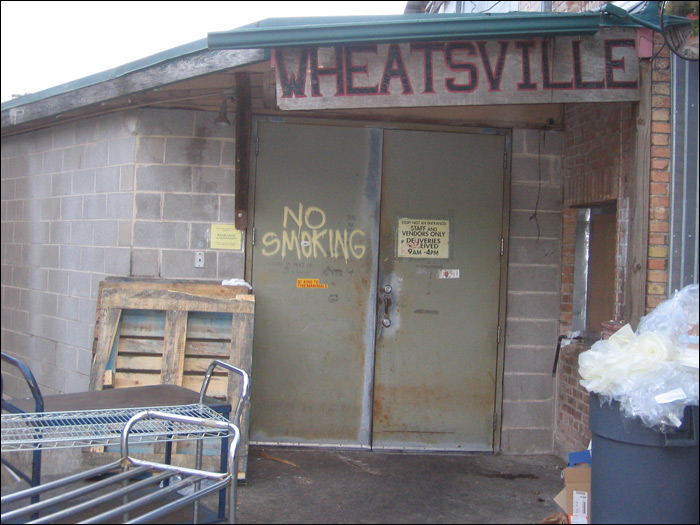
- Wheatsville Co-op, 2005
- Type: Consumers' cooperative
- Founded: March 16, 1976
- Headquarters: Austin, Texas, United States
- Key people: Tanya Carney - General Manager
- Products: Grocery
- Revenue: $23+ million
- Members: 29,000+
- Website: wheatsville.coop

Wheatsville Co-op is a community-owned food cooperative in Austin, Texas, near the campus of the University of Texas at Austin. Named after the displaced black neighborhood of Wheatville, it was founded in 1976, and as of December 2022, has more than 29,000 owners. It sells a full line of groceries, including organic produce, fresh meats, deli products, dairy products, pet foods and household goods, with an emphasis on local goods.

The company announced that its original location in West Campus would close in October 2026 leaving only a single location in South Lamar.

== See also ==
- List of food cooperatives
- List of companies based in Austin, Texas
