= Murders of John Goosey and Stacy Barnett =

American double murder over drugs

Coordinates: 30.2849°N 97.7472°W

John Goosey
- Stacy Barnett (left) and John Goosey (right)
- Born: August 3, 1987; Houston, Texas, U.S.
- Died: July 21, 2009 (aged 21); Austin, Texas, U.S.
- Cause of death: Ballistic trauma
- Known for: Murder victim
- Partner: Stacy Barnett

Stacy Barnett
- Born: September 5, 1986; Houston, Texas, U.S.
- Died: July 21, 2009 (aged 22); Austin, Texas, U.S.
- Cause of death: Ballistic trauma
- Known for: Murder victim
- Partner: John Goosey

The murders of John Forest "Johnny" Goosey and Stacy Marie Barnett occurred on July 21, 2009, in the West Campus area of Austin, Texas, when a man (James Richard "Ricky" Thompson Jr.), who had two accomplices, shot to death two recent graduates from the University of Texas at Austin who originated from the Greater Houston area. This event is sometimes called the West Campus murders. Investigators concluded that the murder was the result of a drug deal debt, and Thompson and his two accomplices all pled guilty to murder and were convicted of the killings. Thompson received two (concurrent) life sentences and the two accomplices received 35-year and 50-year sentences. The murder resulted in media attention on the marijuana trade among young, college-educated people.

== The victims ==
Both Barnett and Goosey grew up in West University Place, a city within Greater Houston. The parents of the couple lived within blocks of each other. Goosey's father, Dr. John D. Goosey, is a Houston ophthalmologist. Goosey's mother, Claire Goosey, worked as a volunteer. John Goosey attended public elementary schools, Annunciation Orthodox School, and Lamar High School in Houston; he graduated from high school in August 2004. He attended the University of Texas after a transfer from the University of Houston. While Barnett (born September 5, 1986), who was a student at West University Elementary School and Lanier Middle School, also attended Lamar, they did not become friends until they attended University of Texas at Austin together.

Barnett began living in a West Campus apartment in summer 2008 and Goosey lived with her. Before the murders, both Barnett and Goosey had graduated, with Goosey obtaining bachelor's degrees in History and English in December 2008 and Barnett obtaining a bachelor's degree in architecture in May 2009. Goosey had plans to attend law school. The couple had been dating for two years and planned to marry. Goosey died at age 21 and Barnett died at age 22.

According to the Austin Police Department (APD), Goosey worked as a midlevel marijuana distributor. Lieutenant Mark Spangler of the APD said that Goosey had a business relationship with Thompson for at least three years. As of July 2009 police stated that they did not believe that Barnett was aware of her boyfriend's drug dealing, and that they believed that she did not use marijuana. The landlord who owned the condominium where Goosey and Barnett lived said that, after smelling marijuana in her apartment and hearing Barnett telling him that her boyfriend had problems with drugs, he warned Barnett about the dangers of her boyfriend's lifestyle.

== The perpetrators ==
James Richard "Ricky" Thompson Jr. is the son of parents who had divorced. His mother was an anthropology lecturer at the University of Texas at Austin who lived in the West Campus area, and he lived with her after his parents divorced. After his mother remarried, Thompson moved to Lakeway with his father. Thompson attended Austin High School in Austin and later Lake Travis High School. He dropped out of high school and worked several menial jobs. Thompson began distributing marijuana he received from Goosey. At the time of the murder, Thompson lived in a house on Alexandria Drive in South Austin.

The other two people involved were Roy M. Renick and Samuel Hadden Gifford.

According to police, Thompson owed $8,500 ($12,800 when adjusted for inflation) to Goosey as part of a drug deal, and Thompson wished to erase the debt.

== The murders ==
On Tuesday, July 21, 2009, the murders occurred at Stacy Barnett's second floor apartment within the Preservation Square condominiums, located at 904 W. 21st Street, in the West Campus area in Austin, Texas.

Thompson arrived at 9:50 am that day. Police said that Thompson shot Goosey multiple times in the head, went upstairs, and shot Barnett twice in the head, including the face. A police affidavit said that all three perpetrators agreed that Barnett, if present, "would be killed because she knew who Thompson was". After the couple was dead, Thompson retrieved his shell casings and smashed the victims' cell phones in an attempt to prevent police from tracing a phone call that he placed to Goosey before the killing. Thompson was picked up by the getaway driver at 10:12 am. Police said that Renick, who had helped plot and cover up the crime, served as the getaway driver.

To prepare for the killings, according to Thompson, his accomplices helped him plot the crime. The group rearranged the furniture in Thompson's apartment to resemble the furniture in Barnett's apartment. Renick designed a homemade silencer used by Thompson.

The police found no signs of forced entry into the Barnett residence.

== Legal action ==
Police received anonymous tips that correlated with leads and evidence. Using the tips, on the Friday after the killings, police searched Thompson's house, found marijuana, and arrested Thompson. Thompson admitted to being involved in the murders after being interviewed by police detectives. On Saturday July 25, 2009, Thompson was charged with two counts of capital murder. After his arrest, Thompson cooperated with police. He was held at the Travis County Jail.

In August 2010 Thompson pleaded guilty to killing Stacy Barnett. Thompson received a life sentence and will be eligible for parole in 2039. Thompson, had he not taken the pleas, would have faced the death penalty or life without parole for killing Barnett. As part of the plea deal, Thompson promised to testify against his two accomplices, in exchange for changing his plea for the Goosey murder to "guilty" and receiving a concurrent life sentence. If Thompson was not forthcoming, the prosecutor had the option of charging him for Goosey's murder and asking for the death penalty. As part of the deal, Thompson changed his plea in regards to the murder of Goosey to "guilty" and was eligible for a second life sentence running concurrently with the first life sentence. Perry Minton, Thompson's attorney, said "The evidence is overwhelming. Because of the evidence in this case, we believe that these two life sentences are the best that he could get." This also meant that Thompson did not receive capital punishment and life without parole penalties that could have resulted from being convicted of Goosey's murder.

Renick and Gifford were also charged with capital murder. On Friday, April 8, 2011, both had pleaded guilty to murder. Renick received a 35-year sentence, and Gifford received two concurrent 50 year sentences. Renick was 22 and Gifford was 20 when they pleaded guilty and were sentenced. Steven Brand, the prosecutor, said that Renick received a shorter sentence than the other two because of the information he gave to police and prosecutors.

As of 2013, Thompson, Texas Department of Criminal Justice (TDCJ)#01661932 and State ID (SID)#08172250, is currently located in the Robertson Unit. Renick, TDCJ#01709362 and SID#08664372, is currently located in the Eastham Unit.

Gifford, TDCJ#01709305 and SID#08417157, is currently located in the Alfred Hughes Unit.

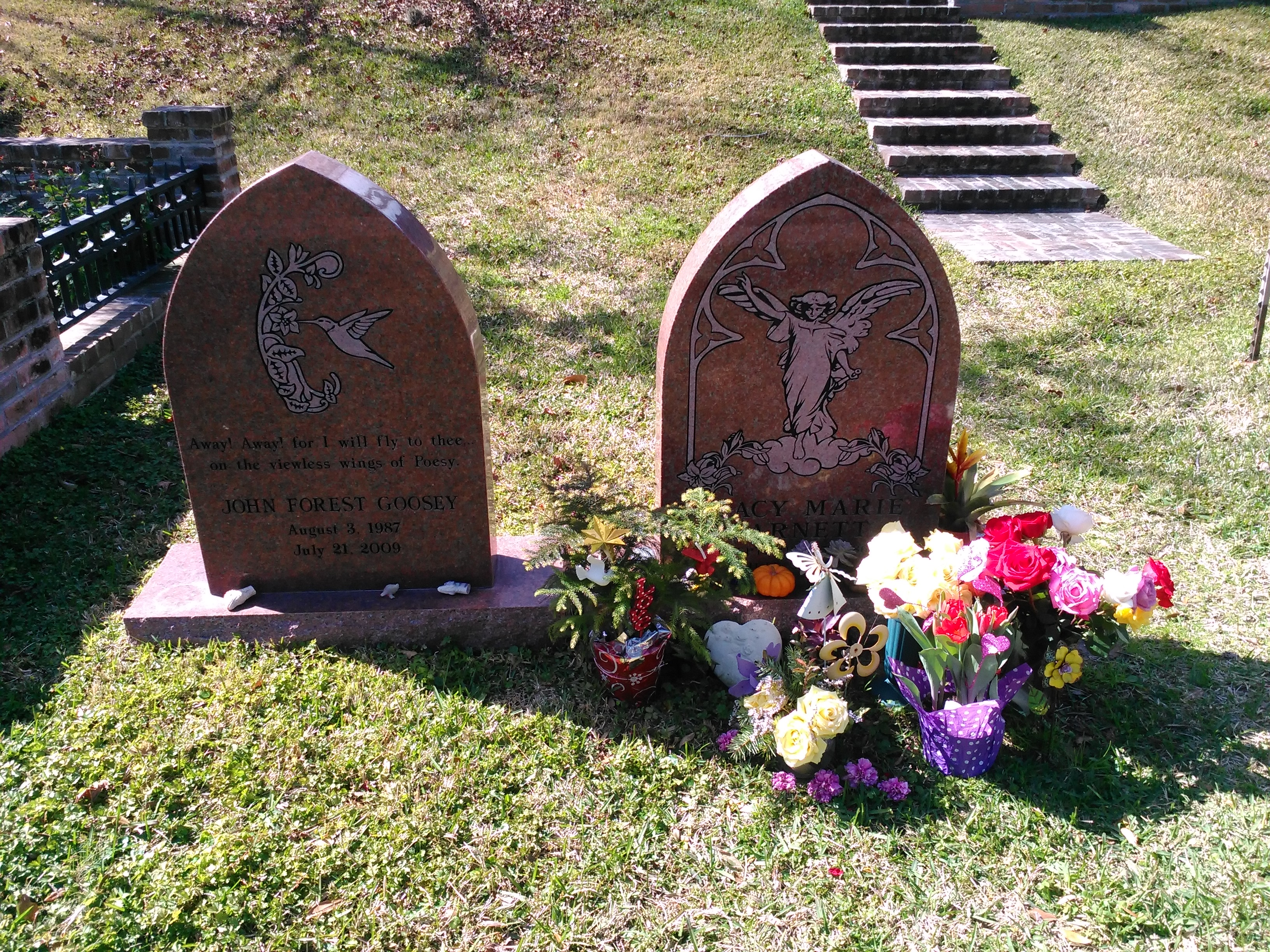
Graves of the victims at Glenwood Cemetery

A private vigil and viewing of the victims occurred in the George H. Lewis & Sons Funeral Home in Memorial area of Houston on Sunday July 26, 2009. A joint funeral for Barnett and Goosey was scheduled to be held at the St. Vincent de Paul Roman Catholic Church in Houston on Monday July 27, 2009. The victims were buried together at the Glenwood Cemetery in Houston.

Before the information about Goosey's drug involvement surfaced, parents of University of Texas at Austin students felt concern for their children. After the murder occurred, the majority of students in the West Campus area and in the UT Austin area said that they did not feel concern about their safety.

== Analysis ==
Clete Snell, a criminal justice professor at the University of Houston–Downtown, said that violence is expected in instances where illegal drugs are involved but that "What makes this case unusual is the status of the people involved. Everyone is asking why a kid who seemed to have a bright future would get involved in this sort of thing." Snell said that many young people believe that the sale of illegal drugs is an easy method of generating income.

Bruce Perry, a psychiatrist quoted in a Houston Chronicle article, said "Whether parents want to believe it or not, most successful dealers are upper-middle-class kids." He added that many young people often grow out of drug dealing and that "Parents would rather not hear about some of the real stuff that happens to kids at that age. Usually they go on to become reasonable people."

Michael Brick of The Dallas Morning News said that the murder "reveals a quietly thriving corner of the drug trade, a casual open secret among educated young men and women in dorms, condos and nightclubs. Driven by heightened border security, advanced growing techniques and a national decriminalization movement, entrepreneurial young marijuana distributors are establishing their own domestic networks apart from the notorious cartels of Mexico and prison gangs of the American Southwest. In a business that feels almost legal, trouble can intrude with little warning."

== In the media ==
This case is featured in the Season 4, Episode 6, titled "Two Deadbeat Ricks" from the show Deadly Sins.

== See also ==
Murders in the Austin area:

- 1991 Austin yogurt shop murders
- Murder of Steven Beard
- Murder of Jennifer Cave - Also in West Campus
