= Austin Peace Academy =

Islamic school in Austin, Texas, United States

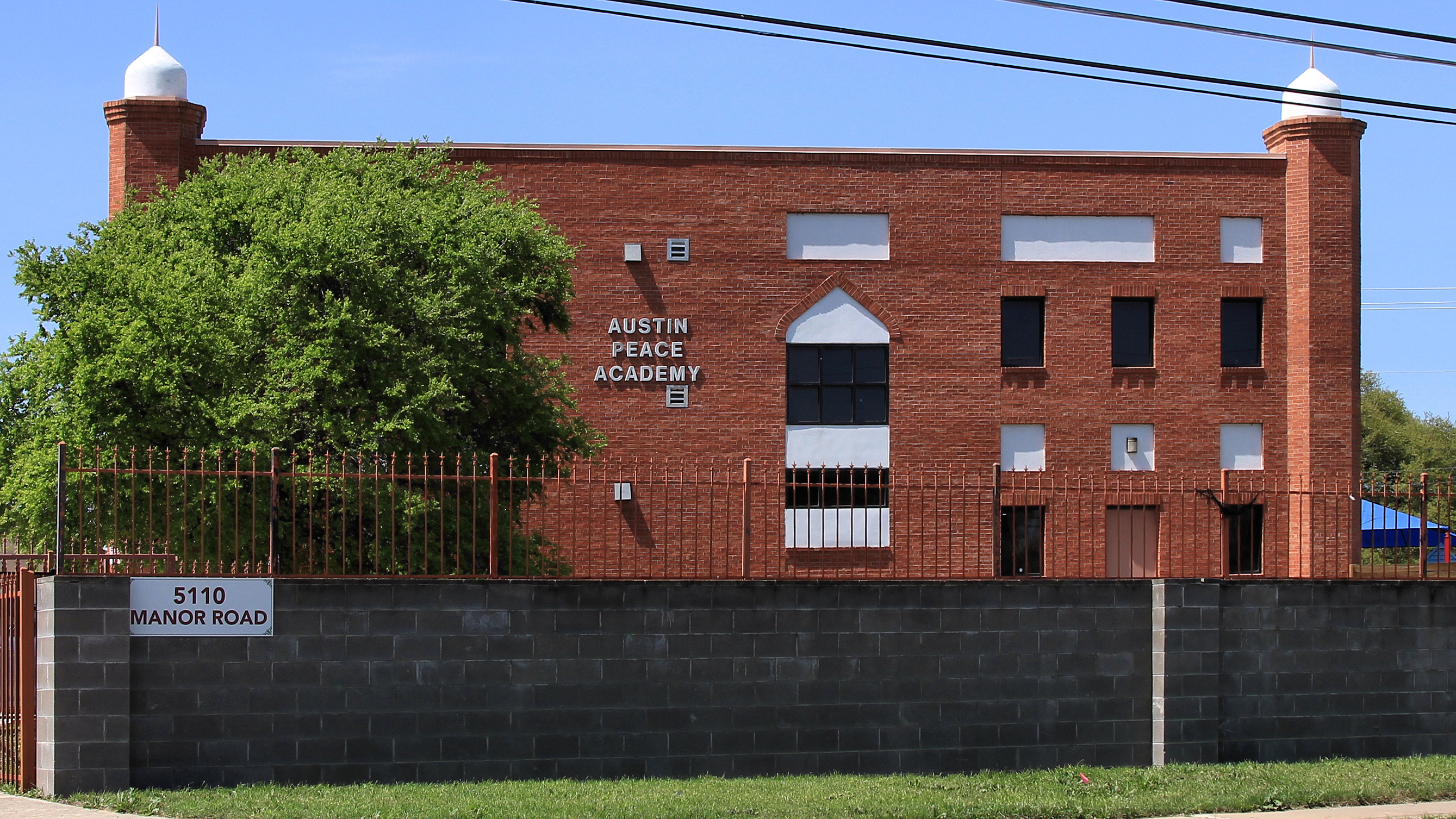

Location
- 5110 Manor Road; Austin, Texas 78723; United States
- 30.2995891°N 97.6867624°W

Information
- Type: Private
- Motto: To produce caring graduates who inspire others and together will change the world for the benefit of humanity.
- Established: 1997
- Locale: Urban
- CEEB code: 440366
- NCES School ID: A9904272
- Principal: Diana Abdi
- Faculty: 47
- Teaching staff: 88.8 (FTE)
- Grades: PK-12
- Gender: Coeducational
- Enrollment: 748 (2023-2024)
  - Pre-kindergarten: 40
  - Kindergarten: 26
  - Grade 1: 26
  - Grade 2: 22
  - Grade 3: 26
  - Grade 4: 22
  - Grade 5: 22
  - Grade 6: 28
  - Grade 7: 28
  - Grade 8: 28
  - Grade 9: 120
  - Grade 10: 120
  - Grade 11: 120
  - Grade 12: 120
- Student to teacher ratio: 8.0
- Hours in school day: 7
- Website: www.apacademy.org

Austin Peace Academy is an Islamic school in Austin, Texas, serving pre-kindergarten through grade 12. As of 2016, its students originate from 19 nationalities. It opened in 1997 in West Campus, housing pre-kindergarten, and moved to current location in 1999. The school received its current name in 2003 and is operated as an entity of the Islamic Center of Greater Austin.

== History ==
The Muslim community in Austin founded Austin Peace Academy to allow Muslim American students in the Austin area to preserve their Islamic identity, heritage and practices.

Austin Peace Academy was established in 1997 in a small building with about sixteen students as the first Islamic school in Austin. The school was initially named Peace Elementary School. In its inaugural year, the school offered Pre-K to Kindergarten (KG). In 1997, the school was moved to its current location at 5110 Manor Road.

In 2003, the school was renamed Austin Peace Academy which serves students from Pre-school to 12th grade. The school has a diverse body of students whose parents come from 19 nationalities.

In November 2005, Austin Peace Academy was approved for accreditation candidacy by the Southern Association of Colleges and Schools (SACS).

In April 2007, the Southern Association of Colleges and Schools (SACS) recommended Austin Peace Academy for accreditation. In December 2007, at the SACS annual meetings, Austin Peace Academy received its accreditation.
