= Texadelphia =

American restaurant chain

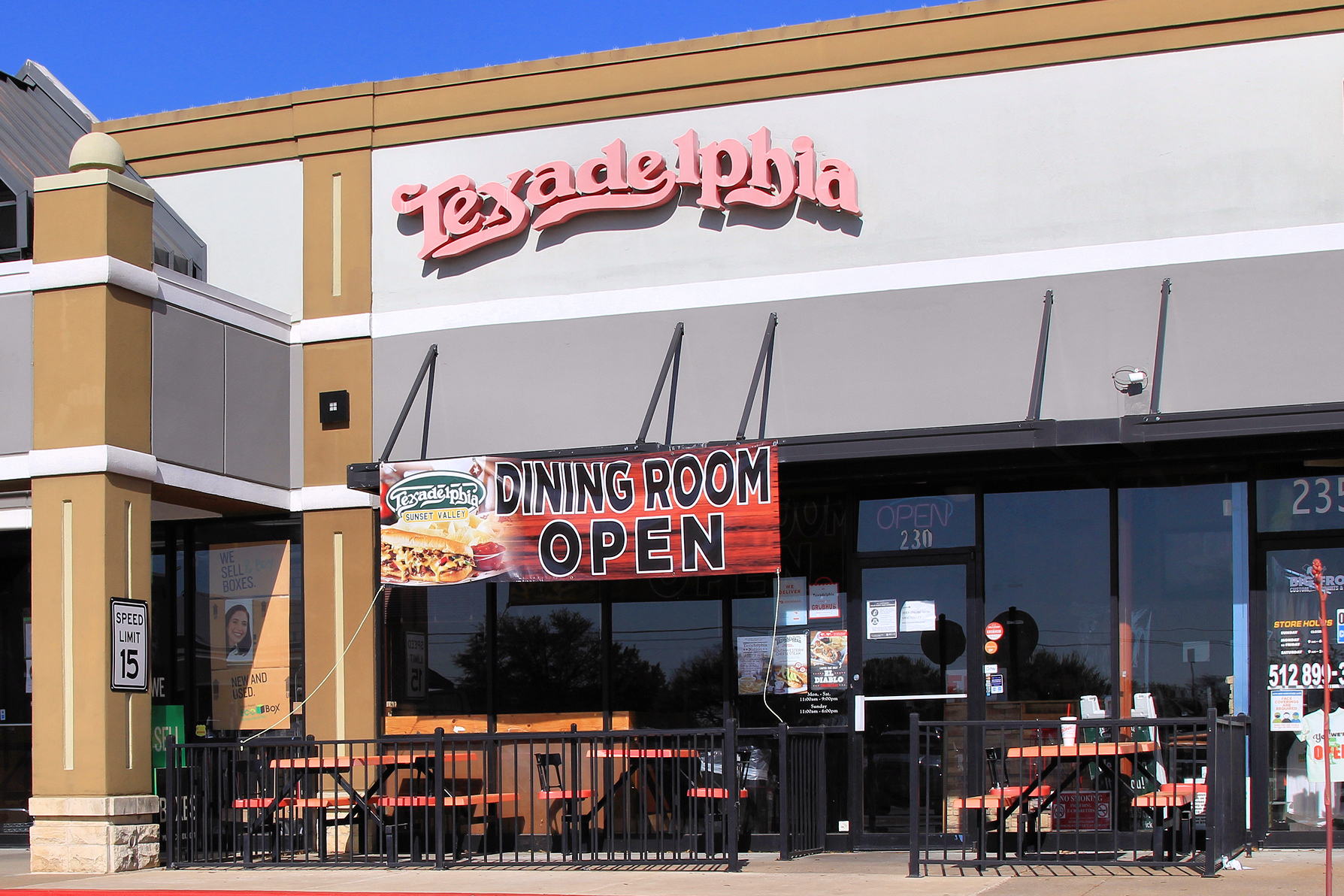
- The Texadelphia sandwich shop in Sunset Valley, Texas
- Industry: Restaurants
- Founded: 1981
- Founder: Joel Stanley
- Headquarters: Richardson, Texas, U.S.
- Area served: Texas; Oklahoma
- Key people: Wyatt Hurt (president)
- Products: American cuisine; Philly Cheesesteak
- Website: https://texadelphia.com/

Texadelphia is a cheesesteak sandwich restaurant chain established in Austin, Texas in 1981 by Philadelphia native Joel Stanley. Texadelphia has had locations in and around Austin, San Antonio, Dallas, Houston, the Rio Grande Valley, and Oklahoma City. The name is a portmanteau of "Texas" and "Philadelphia.”

Texadelphia's food is a combination of East Coast-style cheesesteak sandwiches, Tex-Mex, and vegetarian, with its signature style of replacing bell peppers with jalapeños and a choice of sauces.

== History ==
When the original restaurant relocated in 1985 from US Hwy 183 and Burnet Rd to Guadalupe Street across from The University of Texas, it became a long-running fixture of The Drag and popular for students and faculty at the university until its eventual closure.

A second location opened in the Great Hills area of Austin in 1998. On May 10, 2013 Texadelphia closed its Guadalupe Street location after 28 years due to high renovation costs for the building.

In 2008 Texadelphia founder Joel Stanley sold the company to a group of investors and the headquarters was moved from Austin to Richardson. At that time there were 19 restaurants in the chain. Texadelphia restaurants are independently owned franchises.

In 2015, Brian Livingston was appointed as the president of the company.

Texadelphia closed its Lakeline restaurant leaving the only Austin-area restaurant in Sunset Valley. The San Antonio location was open for three years. As of 2024, the restaurant chain has 11 locations in Texas and one in Oklahoma.
