= Murder of Pete Shrum =

1993 robbery and murder in Mesquite, Texas, U.S.

- Security camera footage from inside the store moments before the murder
- Location: 3030 Military Parkway, Mesquite, Texas, U.S.
- Date: March 27, 1993; 33 years ago
- Target: Texan clerk
- Weapon: Firearm
- Victim: Pete Shrum
- Perpetrators: Anthony Bernard Hampton; Wayne Hampton
- Convictions: Capital murder
- Sentence: Life imprisonment (minimum of 35 years)

On March 27, 1993, in Mesquite, Texas, United States, convenience store clerk Pete Shrum was shot and killed by two armed robbers. Shrum cooperated with the robbers' demands and made no attempt to fight back against them. Despite his compliance, the robbers fatally shot him. The crime was recorded by two security cameras in the store. Footage of the murder was shown on television to help identify the killers.

Since then, the footage has been featured in many documentaries relating to crime, making it well-known. The murder was described as a rare death penalty case, and was the first of only two such cases expected to be tried in Dallas County in 1993. Both suspects were spared execution, but were convicted and sentenced to life in prison for the murder.

== Murder ==
On Saturday, March 27, 1993, 61-year-old Arthur Virgil "Pete" Shrum Jr., a convenience store clerk, attended to customers at the Diamond Shamrock gas station where he worked, in Mesquite, Texas. At around 11:20 p.m. Shrum attended to a woman named Peggy Wells, a regular customer at the store, who was buying gas for her car. Wells had forgotten her purse, and did not have enough money to pay. She returned to her car to get her other purse, so she could pay for the gas.

During this time, the store was empty, apart from Shrum. Another customer, 22-year-old Wayne Hampton, then entered the store and engaged in conversation with Shrum. Outside by the front door of the store, Wayne's accomplice and younger uncle, 18-year-old Anthony Bernard Hampton, nicknamed Elmo, waited with a handgun. While Wayne was in conversation with Shrum, Anthony entered the store and snuck up to the side of Shrum. He drew his handgun and ordered Shrum to hand over any money in the cash register. Shrum cooperated and opened the register, which contained $18. Anthony then fired three shots at point-blank range.

Shrum was hit and fell to the floor. Wayne and Anthony took the money from the cash register, along with a dispenser full of lottery tickets, and fled the store. Wells returned as the robbers exited the store. She was shot at by Anthony and received a bullet to the shoulder but survived the injury. Shrum did not die immediately, but succumbed to his injuries.

== Victim ==
Pete Shrum
- Born: Arthur Virgil Shrum, Jr; June 28, 1931; Wise County, Texas, U.S.
- Died: March 27, 1993 (aged 61); Mesquite, Texas, U.S.
- Cause of death: Gunshot wounds to the abdomen
- Body discovered: March 27, 1993
- Occupations: Convenience store clerk, former Sergeant of the United States Army
- Children: 3

Arthur Virgil "Pete" Shrum, Jr. (June 28, 1931 – March 27, 1993) was a former sergeant of the U.S. Army who served in Korea during the Korean War. Following the war, he worked in the insurance business for most of his career. In his later years, he worked as a clerk at a Diamond Shamrock gas station in Mesquite, Texas. Shrum was born on June 28, 1931, in Wise County, Texas. On April 28, 1950, he married Mary Ann Keown in Decatur, Texas. Shrum was survived by his wife and three children. He is buried in Greenwood Cemetery in Greenwood, Wise County, Texas. Shrum was murdered only a few months before he was due to retire.

== Aftermath ==
Peggy Wells was the only witness to the crime, and was shot at twice by the robbers during their getaway. She was hit in the shoulder but survived, unaware she had even been shot as there was no pain. She returned to the store once the robbers had fled and found Shrum dying. Due to shock, she left the store. After finding Shrum, she drove down the street to find help. Minutes later, another customer arrived and found Shrum lying behind the counter. He waved to his wife outside in hope she could save him as she was a nurse. He then called the police. They tried to save Shrum, but it was already too late.

Footage of the crime was recorded on two security cameras, which helped identify the two killers. Two days after the murder, on March 29, 1993, television stations in Texas broadcast the footage of the crime in hope that members of the public would be able to help identify the killers. Police received tips from viewers. One viewer recognized Anthony's face in the recording, because he had worked with him at a Garland trampoline factory for about three months. Police continued tracking the suspects and interviewed their relatives. A day later, both men were arrested on murder charges. Each of them gave written confessions and surrendered to the police. Several of the Hamptons' family members lied to investigators about the men's whereabouts and were to face criminal charges. Anthony Hampton confessed that his reason for murdering Shrum was because of his frustration over how there was so little money in the cash register, and also because Shrum had seen his face. Both men were unaware that they were being filmed. It was also learned from the videotapes that just three hours before the murder, Anthony had visited the store and made a normal transaction.

== Trial and conviction ==
Anthony's mother, 34-year-old Annie Mae Hampton, recounted to a jury how her son became involved in crime and claimed she lost control over him. In court, she recounted her attempts to help her son. She wanted help, but claimed she received minimal assistance.

Anthony Bernard Hampton and his nephew Wayne Hampton were both convicted of capital murder and sentenced to life in prison. They both must serve 35 years in prison before being eligible for parole. They were spared the death penalty, despite prosecutors urging for it and calling in witnesses to influence the jury to call for it. The case was the first of only two death penalty cases tried in Dallas County in 1993. Prior to the murder of Pete Shrum, the duo were responsible for a number of armed robberies in the Dallas area, two of which happened the same week as Shrum's murder. Surviving store clerks who had been robbed by the Hamptons testified at their trials.

Both men are incarcerated in the Texas Department of Criminal Justice (TDCJ) system in separate facilities. Anthony is imprisoned in the French M. Robertson Unit and Wayne is imprisoned in the Alfred D. Hughes Unit. Both men are not eligible for parole until March 30, 2028, which is 35 years after their initial incarceration.

== In popular culture ==
Footage of the murder was shown on both the television documentary, Real TV, and the 1998 shockumentary film, Banned from Television. The latter however, mistakenly reported that the crime occurred in Plano, Texas, as opposed to Mesquite, Texas, where it actually occurred. The footage was also shown on CBS Evening News, in a segment called "Eye On America," on November 9, 1993. Shrum's son Greg was interviewed on the program about his father's murder.

Wells was interviewed about the crime on Real TV, and described what she had witnessed. She was friends with Shrum and was a regular customer at the store. She was also interviewed on the Inside Edition report of the crime along with Shrum's wife and two of his sons.
