= West Fifth Street Bridge at Shoal Creek =

Historic bridge in Austin, Texas

West Fifth Street Bridge
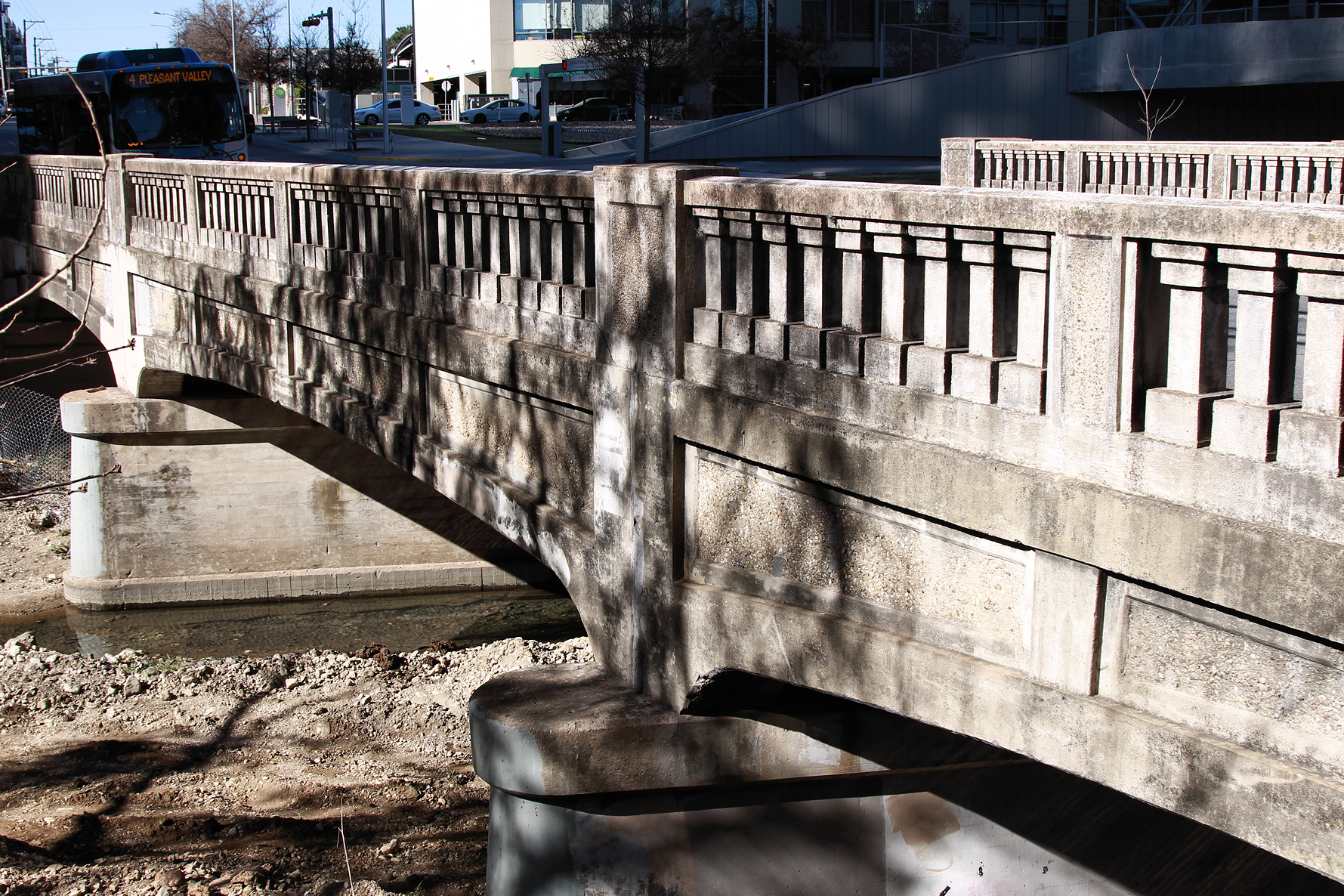
- Southeast view from street level
- Coordinates: 30°16′10″N 97°45′08″W
- Carries: West Fifth Street
- Crosses: Shoal Creek
- Locale: Austin, Texas; United States
- Owner: City of Austin
- ID number: 142270B00015001

Characteristics
- Design: Cantilever girder bridge
- Material: Concrete
- Total length: 112 feet (34 m)
- Width: 52.5 feet (16.0 m)
- Longest span: 44 feet (13 m)
- No. of spans: 3
- Piers in water: 2
- No. of lanes: 4

History
- Designer: Hans R.F. Helland
- Constructed by: John F. Johnson
- Construction cost: $31,650.31
- Opened: 1931

Statistics
- Daily traffic: 16,000 vehicles per day (2019)
- West Fifth Street Bridge at Shoal Creek
- U.S. National Register of Historic Places
- Location within Texas Location within the United States
- Coordinates: 30°16′10″N 97°45′09″W
- Area: less than one acre
- NRHP reference No.: 100004750
- Added to NRHP: December 3, 2019

The West Fifth Street Bridge is a historic cantilever concrete girder bridge in downtown Austin, Texas. Built in 1931, the bridge carries Fifth Street across Shoal Creek to link central Austin with neighborhoods that were then the city's western suburbs. It is one of only a handful of curved cantilever girder bridges in Texas, built as part of the city's 1928 master plan for urban development and beautification. The bridge was added to the National Register of Historic Places in 2019.

== History ==
In Austin's original 1839 city plan, Shoal Creek formed the city's western boundary. As the city expanded in the late 1800s, development west of Shoal Creek increased, and demand for a reliable vehicular crossing grew. In 1887 the city built the West Sixth Street Bridge to carry automobile and streetcar traffic between downtown and the growing western suburbs, but population growth soon led to heavy congestion at this crossing. The mid 1920s saw two smaller bridges built farther north to service the neighborhoods west of the University of Texas, but downtown traffic continued to exceed the Sixth Street bridge's carrying capacity.

Austin's 1928 city plan proposed the construction of additional bridges to the west and south of downtown to ease travel to and from the city center, and it specified that the bridges should be of ornamental concrete rather than bare structural steel. A municipal bond funded the construction of some twenty-one bridges and drainage culverts around the city between 1928 and 1932, including the new Fifth Street bridge. By July 5, 1929, Austin's city council had approved funds for a construction easement along West Fifth Street to the Shoal Creek crossing. Construction began and was completed in 1931, at a total cost of $31,650.31 (equivalent to $670,000 in 2025).

The city undertook renovations in 2008 to repair cracked and broken portions of the concrete and reinforce the deck, but the bridge retains its original design and appearance. On December 3, 2019, it was added to the National Register of Historic Places in recognition of its significance as an excellent example of an unusual bridge type and a manifestation of early-twentieth-century urban planning in Texas's growing capital city.

== Design ==
The West Fifth Street Bridge is a cantilever girder bridge made of reinforced concrete designed to imitate the appearance of an arch bridge. It is 112 feet (34 m) long and 52.5 feet (16.0 m) wide, with a central arch that spans 44 feet (13 m) between two rounded concrete piers on the bed of Shoal Creek, flanked by two cantilevered 34-foot (10 m) spans that rest against concrete abutments at both ends. The deck is made of concrete T-beams resting on nine arched concrete girders, and wing walls extend onto the abutments. The bridge has a concrete guard rail running along each side and onto the wing walls. Today the structure carries a roadway surfaced in asphalt concrete, bearing four roadway lanes along with sidewalks on both sides.

Inspired in part by the City Beautiful movement, the bridge was intended specifically to contribute to Austin's civic beauty, as well as improving its road network. The designer, Hans R. F. Helland of the city's Bond Construction Engineering Department, selected the cantilever design to achieve the aesthetic effect of an arch bridge while allowing for longer spans. The decorative railings are supported by square concrete balusters punctuated by larger square concrete posts. Inset concrete panels in the railings, arch spandrels and wing walls have a decorative pebbled finish. A concrete footpath runs parallel to the creek bed beneath the west half of the bridge's west arch, connected to the deck by a concrete staircase at the bridge's southwest corner.

== See also ==
- National Register of Historic Places listings in Travis County, Texas
- List of bridges on the National Register of Historic Places in Texas
