= Baptist Peace Fellowship of North America =

Baptist network promoting peace and justice

- Theology: Progressive Baptist
- Region: 3 countries
- Headquarters: Charlotte, North Carolina, United States
- Origin: 1984
- Congregations: 77
- Official website: bpfna.org

The Baptist Peace Fellowship of North America-Bautistas por la Paz (BPFNA-Bautistas por la Paz) is an international progressive Baptist association of churches. The headquarters is in Charlotte, North Carolina.

== History ==
The founding of the association was influenced by the publication of the magazine Baptist Peacemaker by students and faculty at the Southern Baptist Theological Seminary in December 1980.It was founded by Baptist leaders from the United States and Canada at the Deer Park Baptist Church in Louisville, Kentucky in 1984.In 1998, it organized the Global Baptist Peace Conference in Sweden, which has since been held in other countries approximately every four years. According to an association census released in 2025, it claimed 77 member churches in 3 countries.

Most members of BPFNA-Bautistas por la Paz are located in one of the four member nations of the organization (Canada, Mexico, Puerto Rico and the United States) however anyone around the world committed to the work of peace and justice can join. The BPFNA-Bautistas por la Paz membership is composed of individuals and organizations with the latter being mostly churches. Some churches choose to get involved at a deeper level and are considered to be partner congregations of the organization.

BPFNA-Bautistas por la Paz is a faith-based partner of Equal Exchange through the Baptist Fair Trade Project.

== Beliefs ==
It seeks to gather, equip and mobilize peacemakers of faith across North America and beyond to engage in the work of peace rooted in justice. BPFNA-Bautistas por la Paz provides resources and tools on a variety of social justice issues such as racial justice, justice for migrants and refugees, climate/environmental justice, justice for indigenous and native peoples and LGBTQ+ liberation to name a few. The organization also has several small grant programs to help fund local and global peacemaking initiatives.

On May 20, 1995, the association adopted the "Statement on Justice and Sexual Orientation" in New York affirming its openness to LGBTQ members.

The association supports blessings of same-sex marriage.

== Baptist Peacemaker ==
Baptist Peacemaker is a quarterly publication by BPFNA-Bautistas por la Paz focusing on the work of peacemakers in the BPFNA-Bautistas por la Paz network.

== Annual Summer Conference ==
BPFNA-Bautistas por la Paz holds a Summer Conference (also known affectionately as "Peace Camp") each year. Each gathering focuses on a different theme and changes location within the BPFNA-Bautistas por la Paz member nations, usually held on a university campus.
