= Islamic Center of Greater Austin =

Mosque in Austin, Texas, United States

- Location in Texas

Religion
- Affiliation: Islam
- Branch/tradition: Sunni
- Ecclesiastical or organizational status: non-profit religious organization

Location
- Location: 5110 Manor Rd, Austin, TX 78723
- Interactive map of Islamic Center of Greater Austin
- Coordinates: 30.299652°N 97.686778°W

Architecture
- Type: Mosque
- Established: 1977

Specifications
- Capacity: 1,000
- Dome: 0
- Minaret: 4

Website
- austinmosque.org

The Islamic Center of Greater Austin (ICGA) is a mosque and Islamic community center in Austin, Texas in the United States.

The Center was established in March 1977 as a non-profit religious organization registered with the State of Texas and is affiliated with the Islamic Society of North America (ISNA) and the North American Islamic Trust (NAIT), which is a subsidiary of ISNA, as its trustee. The center's property is waqf under NAIT.

== Organization history ==
The mosque started in a 2,000 sq ft (190 m^{2}) building without any parking space. It was expanded in 1982 with the purchase of an adjacent building that was remodeled into a prayer hall. In November 1999, the Center completed a two-story building which houses a mosque to accommodate around 1000 congregants and a full-time Islamic school on the second floor.

The Islamic Center of Greater Austin also operates the Austin Peace Academy

== Activities ==
The center offers facilities for daily prayers, a full-time licensed Islamic school, an educational center, audio/video library, weekly Quran school, seminars, workshops and symposiums, counseling center for battered families, marriage contract officiation, ghusl facility and burial services with a 25-acre (100,000 m^{2}) Muslim cemetery.
