= Murder of Jennifer Cave =

2005 murder in Austin, Texas

Coordinates: 30.2897°N 97.7441°W

Jennifer Cave

The murder of Jennifer Cave occurred in the West Campus area of Austin, Texas. On August 18, 2005, Cave's body was discovered. In 2009, Chuck Lindell of the Austin American-Statesman called it the "most infamous West Campus crime".

Cave had dropped out of the Texas State University. She instead attended the Austin Community College, Riverside Campus and had been hired by a law firm as a legal assistant. On August 16, 2005, Cave and her friend Colton Aaron Pitonyak went to Sixth Street in Downtown Austin to celebrate Cave's new job. While the two were in Pitonyak's apartment at the Orange Tree Condominiums, Pitonyak shot Cave through the arm. The bullet traveled into the chest and through the heart, killing her instantly. Pitonyak proceeded to partially dismember her body and to inflict several post-mortem injuries. On Monday, January 29, 2007, Pitonyak was convicted of murder. Pitonyak received a 55-year sentence. Pitonyak's former girlfriend Laura Ashley Hall was convicted of tampering with evidence and hindering the apprehension of Pitonyak.

== Victim ==
Jennifer Rae Cave (born March 12, 1984) moved to Corpus Christi, Texas, in high school. She was one of five girls in her family. She attended school in Bishop, Texas, before moving to Corpus Christi in 2000. In 2002, she graduated from Mary Carroll High School in Corpus Christi and in August of that year she traveled to San Marcos, Texas, to attend Texas State University as a finance major. She dropped out after one semester and worked at a restaurant in Austin, Texas, while briefly attending Austin Community College, Riverside Campus. Before her murder, she began to work for a law firm as a legal assistant.

== Perpetrator and accomplice ==
Colton Aaron Pitonyak was a finance major at the University of Texas at Austin, originating from Bryant, Arkansas, in Greater Little Rock. Before coming to Austin, Pitonyak attended Christ the King School and Catholic High School for Boys in Little Rock, Arkansas. He was a National Merit Scholar, and in 2000, Pitonyak was one of seven senior finalists at his high school and one of 166 senior finalists in the state. Pitonyak had high grades and earned a scholarship to attend UT Austin. Pitonyak had also once entered a rehabilitation program for drugs. In 2004, police found cocaine, prescription sleeping pills that he had unlawfully obtained, and anxiety medication in his apartment. He was arrested for possession of illegal drugs. Pitonyak had no previous record of violent crime. Authorities said that Cave and Pitonyak had no previous discord before the murder.

Laura Ashley Hall was a University of Texas at Austin student who at one time had been Pitonyak's girlfriend. Before Hall's re-imprisonment beginning in 2010, she lived in the area around Bandera, Texas, with her parents. She had plans to take the Law School Admission Test (LSAT) so she would be a lawyer or attorney.

== Murder ==
On August 16, 2005, Cave and Pitonyak went to Sixth Street in Downtown Austin to celebrate Cave's new job. Cave and Pitonyak went to dinner before Cave was murdered.

Jennifer Cave died in Pitonyak's apartment at the Orange Tree Condominiums, at 2529 Rio Grande Street in West Campus, Austin, Texas. Bill Bishop, a prosecutor in the Travis County, Texas, government, said "As far as murders go, this is a very clean murder. He shot her through the arm, bullet traveled into the chest, through the heart pretty much killing her instantly. It was the post-murder behavior that made it so grotesque. The mutilation was anger… it wasn't any effort to hide the body or get rid of the body. It was just playing with it, like it was a toy."

Upon discovery, Cave's body had been partially dismembered and had many stab wounds. A hacksaw had been placed on her abdomen. After her death, she had been shot in the head once. Toxicology tests concluded that during her death, Cave had alcohol, marijuana, and methamphetamine in her system.

== Discovery of the body ==
On the morning of August 17, 2005, the law firm where Cave worked called Cave's family to say that she did not show up for work. Sharon Sedwick, Cave's mother, and Jim Sedwick, her stepfather, discovered that she had been with Colton Pitonyak. Pitonyak told Sedwick that Cave was not around and asked them to leave him alone. On August 18, the Sedwicks traveled to Austin and found Cave's car at Pitonyak's apartment. Jim Sedwick called 9-1-1. The police said they could not search the apartment without a warrant. Jim Sedwick broke into the apartment after the police departed. After he discovered Jennifer Cave's body, Jim Sedwick called 9-1-1 again.

== Escape and capture ==
On the day that Cave's body had been discovered, Colton Pitonyak and Laura Hall escaped from the United States, using Hall's automobile. Authorities found that the two had crossed into Mexico on August 18, 2005. The two were in Mexico for five days. A Mexican SWAT team discovered the two in a Holiday Inn in Piedras Negras, a city on the Mexico–United States border across from Eagle Pass, Texas, on August 23, 2005. The Mexican law enforcement drove the two to the border. There, U.S. Marshals arrested Pitonyak. Hall was allowed to leave by herself.

== Legal outcome ==
On August 23, 2005, Colton Pitonyak was charged with murder. Laura Hall was arrested in September 2005. On Monday, January 29, 2007 Pitonyak, then 24, was convicted of murder. On the same day, the jury panel recommended a 55-year prison sentence for Pitonyak. Pitonyak received a 55-year sentence. He will be eligible for parole once 50% of his sentence has been served, at which time he will be around 51 years old. Outside court, Jim Sedwick said, as paraphrased by Harriet Ryan of Court TV, that "there was only a two-and-a-half-year functional difference between the jury's sentence and the life term. In Texas, those sentenced to life are eligible for parole in 30 years."

In 2007, Hall was convicted of tampering with evidence and hindering the apprehension of Pitonyak. The former charge originates from the dismemberment of Cave's body. She was sentenced to five years for the tampering and one year for the hindering, with the sentences to be served concurrently. Jordan Smith of the Austin Chronicle said "The relatively light sentence, after an emotional appeal from Hall's father, suggests that the delay in reaching a verdict reflected some division in the jurors' judgment of Hall's culpability. But Hall's trial, like Pitonyak's, in the end produced little understanding either of what really happened to young Jennifer Cave or, most especially, why her supposed friends ended her life with such brutal, emotionless, and unthinking cruelty." On February 19, 2009, the Texas Third Court of Appeals ordered re-sentencing. The court ruled that her sentencing hearing was unfair and Hall was released on bond.

In 2010, a jury in Travis County, Texas, resentenced Hall to the maximum possible sentence, including prison and $14,000 ($20669.92 when adjusted for inflation) in fines. The sentences, to be served concurrently, include 10 years for tampering with evidence and one year for hindering apprehension. She would get credit for two years that she had already spent in confinement prior to the sentencing. On Monday February 8, 2010, Hall was placed in county custody prior to her new sentencing hearing. On August 3, 2010, Hall was taken into the custody of the state prison system, the Texas Department of Criminal Justice (TDCJ). She was initially assigned to the Plane State Jail. On October 28, 2011, the state denied parole to Laura Hall. She became eligible again in November 2012.

As of 2023, Colton Pitonyak, TDCJ#01413729 and State ID (SID)#07004898, is incarcerated in the Memorial Unit near Rosharon, Texas.

In 2014, Hall was denied parole by the Texas Board of Pardons and Paroles. In 2016, Laura Hall was still incarcerated in the Lockhart Unit. On March 15, 2018, she was released on parole from prison under mandatory supervision, including GPS monitoring, and could not return to Travis County or to make any contact with the Cave family until after the end of her prison sentence, which was in August of the same year.

== Legacy ==
Cave's visitation was held at the Seaside Funeral Home on Monday August 22, 2005, and the funeral was held at the All Saints Episcopal Church on Tuesday August 23. Cave was buried in a private ceremony.

In 2008, Kathryn Casey wrote the book A Descent into Hell: The True Story of an Altar Boy, a Cheerleader, and a Twisted Texas Murder (ISBN 9780061230875) about the crime. HarperCollins Publishers published the book.

In 2011, 48 Hours on CBS documented the murder and the aftermath as well as the trial, focusing on Laura Hall in a special called "48 Hours: In Too Deep".

== See also ==
Murders in the Austin area:

- 1991 Austin yogurt shop murders
- Murders of John Goosey and Stacy Barnett - Also in West Campus
- Murder of Steven Beard
