= History of Austin, Texas =

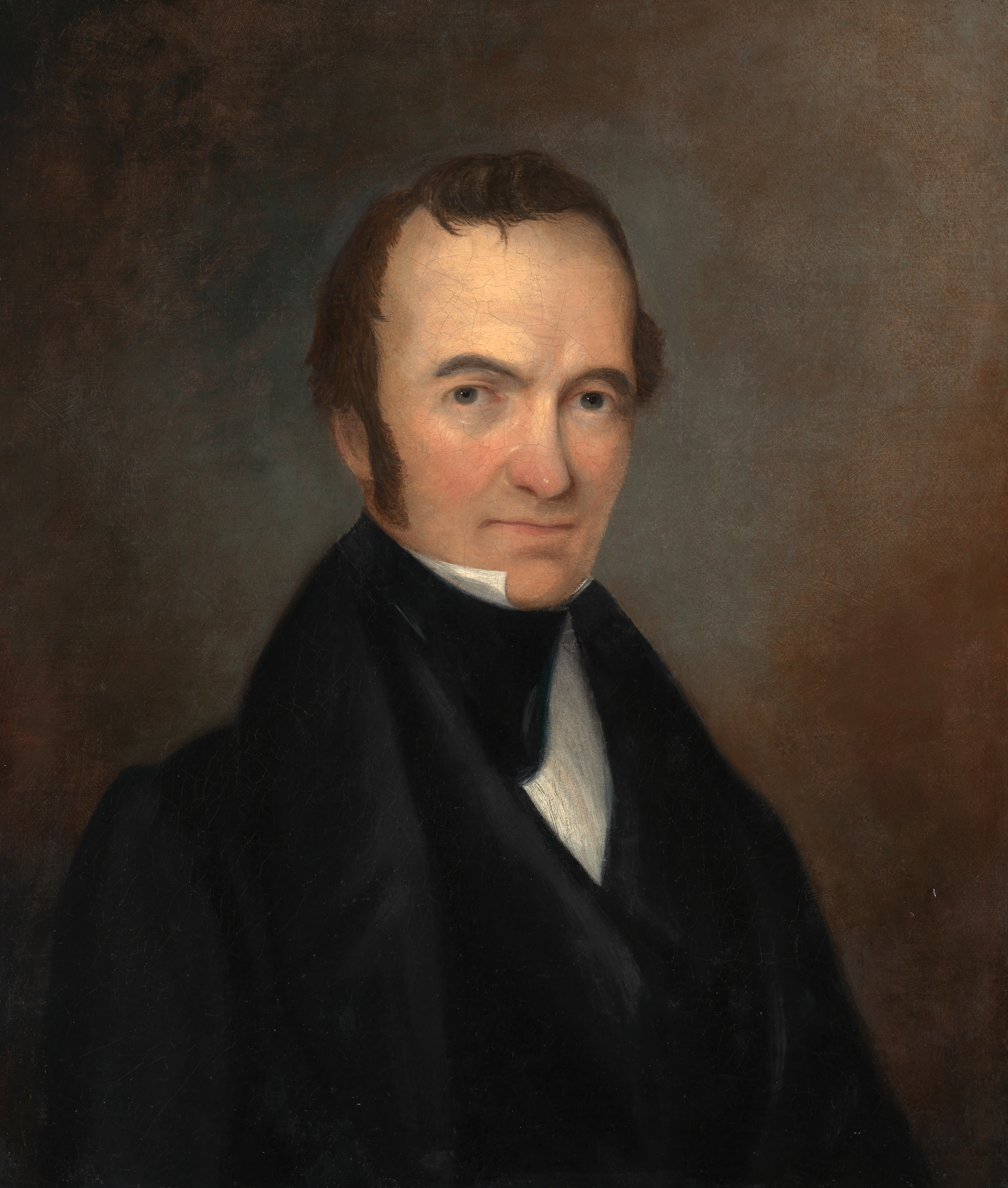
Stephen F. Austin

After declaring its independence from Mexico in March, 1836, the Republic of Texas had various changing locations as its seat of government. One stable location was perceived as preferable and so a search for a permanent site for the capital began. In January, 1839, with Mirabeau B. Lamar as its newly elected president, a site selection committee of five commissioners was formed. Edward Burleson had surveyed the planned townsite of Waterloo, near the mouth of Shoal Creek on the Colorado River, in 1838; it was incorporated January 1839. By April of that year the site selection commission had selected Waterloo to be the new capital. A bill previously passed by Congress in May, 1838, specified that any site selected as the new capital would be named Austin, after the late Stephen F. Austin; hence Waterloo upon selection as the capital was renamed Austin. The first lots in Austin went on sale August 1839.

Austin's history has also been largely tied to state politics and in the late 19th century, the establishment of the University of Texas made Austin a regional center for higher education, as well as a hub for state government. In the 20th century, Austin's music scene had earned the city the nickname "Live Music Capital of the World." With a population of over 800,000 inhabitants in 2010, Austin is experiencing a population boom. During the 2000s (decade) Austin was the third fastest-growing large city in the nation.

== Beginning ==
Evidence of habitation of the Balcones Escarpment region of Texas can be traced to at least 11,000 years ago. Two of the oldest Paleolithic archeological sites in Texas, the Levi Rock Shelter and Smith Rock Shelter, are located southwest and southeast of present-day Austin respectively. Several hundred years before the arrival of European settlers, the area was inhabited by a variety of nomadic Native American tribes. These indigenous peoples fished and hunted along the creeks, including present-day Barton Springs, which proved to be a reliable campsite. At the time of Austin's founding, the Tonkawa tribe was the most common, with Comanches, Lipan Apaches and Waco also frequenting the area.

The first European settlers in the present-day Austin were a group of Spanish friars who arrived from East Texas in July 1730. They established three temporary missions, La Purísima Concepción, San Francisco de los Neches and San José de los Nazonis, on a site by the Colorado River, near Barton Springs. The friars found conditions undesirable and relocated to the San Antonio River within a year of their arrival. Following Mexico's Independence from Spain, Anglo-American settlers began to populate Texas and reached present-day Central Texas by the 1830s. The site where Austin is located was surveyed by Edward Burleson in 1838, calling it Waterloo. It was incorporated in January, 1839, only months before selection as the site of the new capital, ending its existence. Early Austin resident and chronicler Frank Brown says the first and only settler in 1838 was Jacob Harrell who may have been living there already. Living in a tent with his family, he later built a cabin and small stockade near the mouth of Shoal Creek. In its short lifespan of less than two years the population of Waterloo grew to only about twelve people made up of four families.

=== Capital City of A New Republic ===
By 1836 the Texas Revolution was over and the Republic of Texas was independent. That year was also characterized by political disarray in Texas. Between 1836 and 1837 no fewer than five Texas sites served as temporary capitals of the new republic (Washington-on-the-Brazos, Harrisburg, Galveston, Velasco and Columbia), before President Sam Houston moved the capital to Houston in 1837.

Shortly after the election of President Mirabeau B. Lamar, the Texas Congress appointed a site-selection commission to locate an optimal site for a new permanent capital. They chose a site on the western frontier, after viewing it at the instruction of President Lamar, who visited the sparsely settled area in 1838. Lamar was a proponent of westward expansion. Impressed by its beauty, abundant natural resources, promise as an economic hub, and central location in Texas territory, the commission purchased 7,735 acres (3,130 ha) along the Colorado River consisting of a planned townsite surveyed by Edward Burleson in 1838 (incorporated Jan, 1839) he called Waterloo, and adjacent lands.

Because the area's remoteness from population centers and its vulnerability to attacks by Mexican troops and Native Americans displeased many Texans, Sam Houston among them, political opposition made Austin's early years precarious ones. However, Lamar prevailed in his nomination, which he felt would be a prime location that intersected the roads to San Antonio and Santa Fe.

Officially chartered in 1839, the Texas Congress designated the name of Austin for the new city. According to local folklore, Stephen F. Austin, the "father of Texas" for whom the new capital city was named, negotiated a boundary treaty with the local Native Americans at the site of the present-day Treaty Oak after a few settlers were killed in raids. But as the Daughters of the Republic of Texas pointed out as early as 1925, Stephen F. Austin died in 1836 before either Waterloo or Austin were founded and "[he] never held any conferences with Indians as far west as Austin." In 1936 the Texas Centennial Historical Commission concluded the story was "unfounded romance ... without historical foundation". The Commission also concluded the "tradition probably grew out of a treaty made by Carita, Tonkawa Indian chief, and Stephen F. Austin in 1824, by which the Indians agreed to keep out of the colony." The colony referenced is San Felipe de Austin in today's Austin County, Texas which was conflated with the current City of Austin, Travis County. The city's original name is honored by local businesses such as Waterloo Ice House and Waterloo Records, as well as Waterloo Park downtown.

Lamar tapped Judge Edwin Waller to direct the planning and construction of the new town. Waller chose a 640-acre (260 ha) site on a bluff above the Colorado River, nestled between Shoal Creek to the west and Waller Creek (which was named for him) to the east. Waller and a team of surveyors developed Austin's first city plan, commonly known as the Waller Plan, dividing the single square-mile plot into a grid plan of 14 blocks running in both directions. One grand avenue, which Lamar named "Congress", cut through the center of town from Capitol Square down to the Colorado River. The streets running north and south (paralleling Congress) were named for Texas rivers with their order of placement matching the order of rivers on the Texas state map. The east and west streets were named after trees native to the region, despite the fact that Waller had recommended using numbers. (They were eventually changed to numbers in 1884.) The city's perimeters stretched north to south from the river at 1st Street to 15th Street, and from East Avenue (now Interstate 35) to West Avenue. Much of this original Waller Plan design is still intact in downtown Austin today.

In October 1839, the entire government of the Republic of Texas arrived by oxcart from Houston. By the next January, the population of the town was 839. During the Republic of Texas era, France sent Alphonse Dubois de Saligny to Austin as its chargé d'affaires. Dubois purchased 22 acres (8.9 ha) of land in 1840 on a high hill just east of downtown to build a legation, or diplomatic outpost. The French Legation stands as the oldest documented frame structure in Austin. Also in 1839, the Texas Congress set aside 40 acres (16 ha) of land north of the capitol and downtown for a "university of the first class." This land became the central campus of the University of Texas at Austin in 1883.

=== Political turmoil and the Texas Annexation ===
Austin flourished initially but in 1842 entered the darkest period in its history. Lamar's successor as President of the Republic of Texas, Sam Houston, ordered the national archives transferred to Houston for safekeeping after Mexican troops captured San Antonio on March 5, 1842. Convinced that removal of the republic's diplomatic, financial, land, and military-service records was tantamount to choosing a new capital, Austinites refused to relinquish the archives. Houston moved the government anyway, first to Houston and then to Washington-on-the-Brazos, which remained the seat of government until 1845. The archives stayed in Austin. When Houston sent a contingent of armed men to seize the General Land Office records in December 1842, they were foiled by the citizens of Austin and Travis County in an incident known as the Texas Archive War. Deprived of its political function, Austin languished. Between 1842 and 1845 its population dropped below 200 and its buildings deteriorated.

During the summer of 1845, Anson Jones, Houston's successor as president, called a constitutional convention meeting in Austin, approved the annexation of Texas to the United States and named Austin the state capital until 1850, at which time the voters of Texas were to express their preference in a general election. After resuming its role as the seat of government in 1845, Austin officially became the state capital on February 19, 1846, the date of the formal transfer of authority from the republic to the state.

Austin's status as capital city of the new U.S. state of Texas remained in doubt until 1872, when the city prevailed in a statewide election to choose once and for all the state capital, turning back challenges from Houston and Waco.

=== Statehood and the U.S. Civil War ===
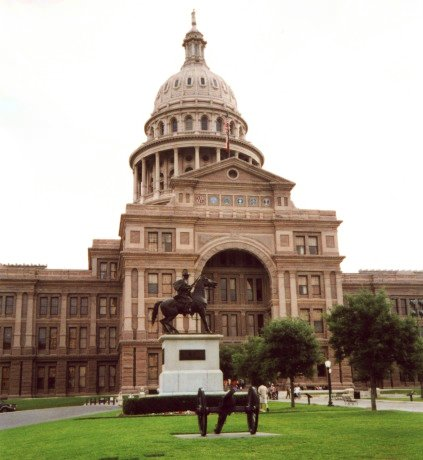
Texas State Capitol

Austin recovered gradually, population reaching 854 by 1850, 225 of whom were slaves and one a free black. Forty-eight percent of Austin's family heads owned slaves. The city entered a period of accelerated growth following its decisive triumph in the 1850 election to determine the site of the state capital for the next twenty years. For the first time the government constructed permanent buildings, among them a new capitol at the head of Congress Avenue, completed in 1853, and the Governor's Mansion, completed in 1856. State-run asylums for deaf, blind, and mentally ill Texans were erected on the fringes of town. Congregations of Baptists, Episcopalians, Methodists, Presbyterians, and Catholics erected permanent church buildings, and the town's elite built elegant Greek Revival mansions. By 1860 the population had climbed to 3,546, including 1,019 slaves and twelve free blacks. That year thirty-five percent of Austin's family heads owned slaves.

While Texas voted overwhelmingly to secede from the Union and join the Confederacy in 1861, Travis County was one of a few counties in state to vote against the secession ordinance (704 to 450). However, Unionist sentiment waned once the war began. By April 1862 about 600 Austin and Travis County men had joined some twelve volunteer companies serving the Confederacy. Austinites followed with particular concern news of the successive Union thrusts toward Texas, but the town was never directly threatened. Like other communities, Austin experienced severe shortages of goods, spiraling inflation, and the decimation of its fighting men.

After learning in late April 1865 of the Confederate surrender at Appomattox, civil order in Austin began to break down. Governor Pendleton Murrah vacated his office and fled to Mexico with other officials. Lieutenant Governor Fletcher Stockdale then stepped up to serve as Acting Governor. In May, Captain George R. Freeman organized a company of 30 volunteers to protect the city. On June 11, a group of 50 men broke into the state treasury northeast of the Capitol. A gunfight ensued when Freeman and his volunteers arrived at the treasury. One of the robbers was mortally wounded, and the others fled west toward Mount Bonnell with $17,000 in gold and silver, trailing currency along their path. None of the thieves and none of their loot was found.

The end of the Civil War brought Union occupation troops to the city and a period of explosive growth of the African-American population, which increased by 57 percent during the 1860s. During the late 1860s and early 1870s the city's newly emancipated blacks established the residential communities of Masontown, Wheatville, Pleasant Hill, and Clarksville. By 1870, Austin's 1,615 black residents constituted some 36 percent of the town's 4,428 inhabitants.

=== Emergence of a political and educational center ===
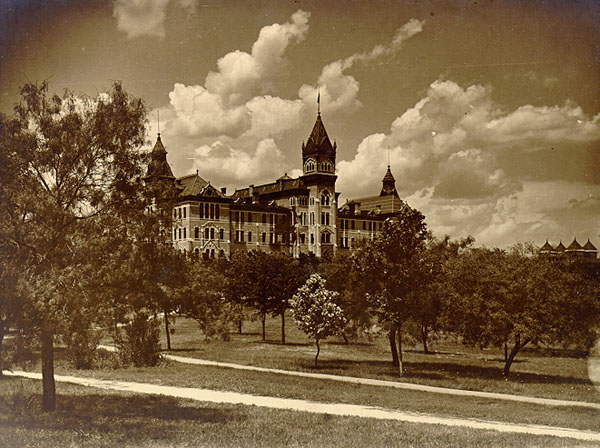
The university's Old Main Building in 1903

The Reconstruction boom of the 1870s brought dramatic changes to Austin. In the downtown area, the wooden wagon yards and saloons of the 1850s and 1860s began to be replaced by the more solid masonry structures still standing today. On December 25, 1871, a new era opened with the coming of the Houston and Texas Central Railway, Austin's first railroad connection. By becoming the westernmost railroad terminus in Texas and the only railroad town for scores of miles in most directions, Austin was transformed into a trading center for a vast area. Construction boomed and the population more than doubled in five years to 10,363. The many foreign-born newcomers gave Austin's citizenry a more heterogeneous character. By 1875 there were 757 inhabitants from Germany, 297 from Mexico, 215 from Ireland, and 138 from Sweden. For the first time a Mexican-American community took root in Austin, in a neighborhood near the mouth of Shoal Creek. Accompanying these dramatic changes were civic improvements, among them gas street lamps in 1874, the first mule-drawn streetcar line in 1875, and the first elevated bridge across the Colorado River about 1876. Although a second railroad, the International and Great Northern, reached Austin in 1876, the town's fortunes turned downward after 1875 as new railroads traversed Austin's trading region and diverted much of its trade to other towns. From 1875 to 1880 the city's population increased by only 650 inhabitants to 11,013. Austin's expectations of rivaling other Texas cities for economic leadership faded.

However, Austin solidified its position as a political center during the 1870s, after the city prevailed in the 1872 statewide election to settle the state capital question once and for all. Three years later Texas took the first steps toward constructing a new Texas State Capitol that culminated in 1888 in the dedication of a magnificent granite building towering over the town. After a fire destroyed its predecessor in 1881, a nationwide design contest was held to determine who would build the current Capitol building. Architect Elijah E. Myers, who built the Capitols of Michigan and Colorado, won with a Renaissance Revival style. However, construction was held up for two years over a debate as to whether the exterior should be built from granite or limestone. It was eventually decided that it would be built of "sunset red" granite from Marble Falls. Funded by the famous XIT Ranch, the building remains part of the Austin skyline. The state capitol is smaller than the United States Capitol in total gross square footage, but is actually 15 feet (4.6 m) taller than its Washington, D.C., counterpart.

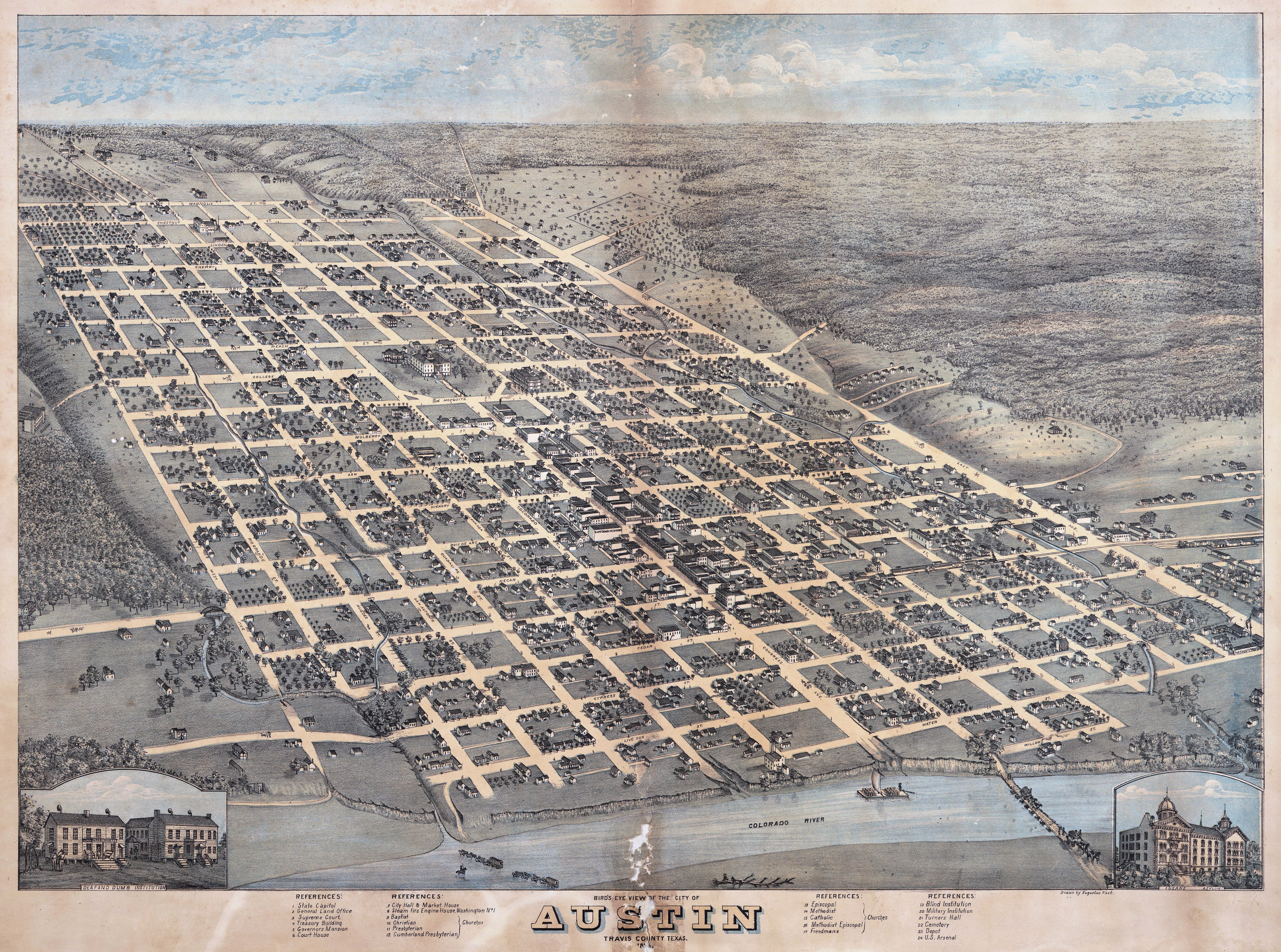
An 1873 illustration of Austin

Another statewide election in 1881 set the stage for Austin to become an educational and cultural hub as well, when it was chosen as the site for a new state university in a hotly contested election. A state constitution adopted in 1876 mandated that Texas establish a "university of the first class" to be located by vote of the people and styled the University of Texas. On September 6, 1881, Austin was chosen for the site of the main university and Galveston for the location of the medical department. In 1882 construction began on the Austin campus with the placement of the cornerstone of the Main Building. The university held classes for the first time in 1883. Tillotson Collegiate and Normal Institute, the forerunner of Huston–Tillotson University, founded by the American Missionary Association to provide educational opportunities for African-Americans, opened its doors in East Austin by 1881. The Austin Independent School District was established the same year.

Before either UT or Huston–Tillotson opened their doors, however, St. Edward's Academy (the forerunner of today's St. Edward's University) was established by the Rev. Edward Sorin in 1878 on farmland in present-day south Austin. In 1885, the president, the Rev. P. J. Franciscus strengthened the prestige of the academy by securing a charter, changing its name to St. Edward's College, assembling a faculty, and increasing enrollment. Subsequently, St. Edward's began to grow, and the first school newspaper, the organization of baseball and football teams, and approval to erect an administration building all followed. Well-known architect Nicholas J. Clayton of Galveston was commissioned to design the college's Main Building, four stories tall and constructed with local white limestone in the Gothic Revival, that was finished in 1888.

Of note during this period were serial murders committed in 1884 and 1885 by an unidentified perpetrator known as the "Servant Girl Annihilator". According to some sources there were eight murders, seven women and one man, attributed to the serial killer, in addition to eight serious injuries. These occurred in a town that had only about 23,000 citizens total. The murders made national headlines, but only three years later London was plagued by Jack the Ripper overshadowing Austin's tragedy in the history books.

== 20th–21st century ==
=== Learning to live with the Colorado River ===
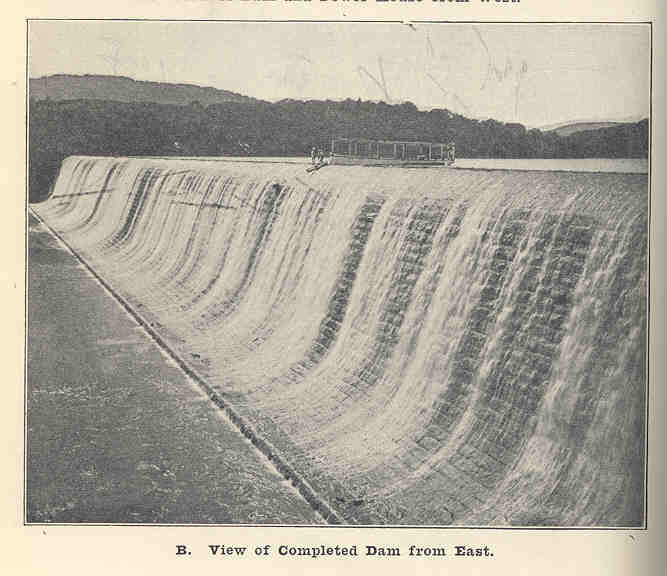
View of the recently completed Austin Dam

Austin's fortunes have been tied with the Colorado River for much of its history, no more so than in the 1890s. At the urging of local civic leader Alexander Penn Wooldridge, the citizens of Austin voted overwhelmingly to put themselves deeply in debt to build a dam along the river to attract manufacturing. The hope was that cheap hydroelectricity would lure industrialists who would line the riverbanks with cotton mills. Austin would become "the Lowell of the South," and the sleepy center of government and education would be transformed into a bustling industrial city. The town had reached its limits as a seat of politics and education, Wooldridge contended, yet its economy could not sustain its present size. Empowered by a new city charter in 1891 that more than tripled Austin's corporate area from 4 1/2 to 16 1/2 square miles, the city fathers implemented a plan to build a municipal water and electric system, construct a dam for power, and lease most of the hydroelectric power to manufacturers. By 1893 the sixty-foot-high Austin Dam was completed just northwest of town. In 1895 dam-generated electricity began powering the four-year-old electric streetcar line and the city's new water and light systems. The dammed river formed a lake that became known as "Lake McDonald," for John McDonald, the mayor who had whipped up support for the project—attracted new residents and developers, while the waters of the lake itself drew those seeking respite from the Texas heat. Austin boomed in the mid-1890s, driven largely by land speculation. Monroe M. Shipe established Hyde Park, a classic streetcar suburb north of downtown, and smaller developments sprang up around the city. Thirty-one new 165-foot-high moonlight towers illuminated Austin at night. Civic pride ran strong during those years, which also saw the city blessed with the talents of sculptor Elisabet Ney and writer O. Henry.

By today's standards, the dam was unremarkable – a wall of granite and limestone, 65 feet high and 1,100 feet long, with no catwalk or floodgates. But Scientific American magazine was sufficiently impressed to feature the dam on its cover. However, structurally the dam was likely doomed from the start, as it was constructed on the spot where the Balcones Fault passes under the river. Silt had filled nearly half the lake by February 1900, and the dam's design failed to accommodate the force that could be created by a large volume of water. However, the flow of the Colorado proved to be far more variable than the project's promoters had claimed, and the dam was never able to produce the kind of steady power needed to drive a bank of mills. The manufacturers never came, periodic power shortfalls disrupted city services, Lake McDonald silted up, and, on April 7, 1900, the Austin Dam was dealt its final blow after a spring storm. At 11:20 am, floodwaters crested at 11 feet atop the dam before it disintegrated, with two 250-foot sections – almost half the dam – breaking away. In all, the flood drowned 18 people and destroyed 100 houses in Austin, at a total estimated loss of $1.4 million, in 1900 dollars.

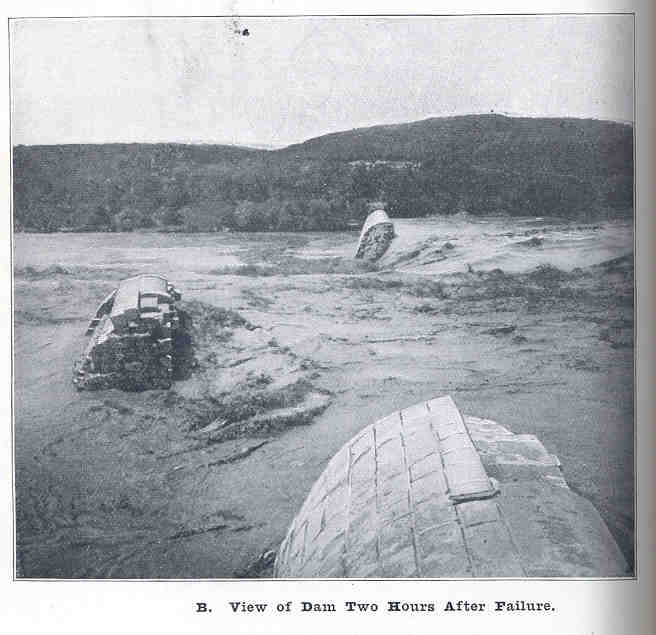
Austin Dam two hours after its 1900 failure

After 1900, the people of Austin did what they could to recover from the disaster. Having gotten a taste of city-owned electric power, they refused to go back; they bought out the local private power company, which used steam-driven generators, and today's Austin Energy municipal utility is in a sense a legacy of the old Austin Dam. The city also tried to rebuild the dam itself, but a dispute with the contractor left the repairs unfinished in 1912, and another flood in 1915 damaged it further. The wrecked dam sat derelict, "a tombstone on the river," until the Lower Colorado River Authority stepped in and, with federal money, rebuilt it as Tom Miller Dam, completed in 1940. The remaining portions of the 1893 and 1912 dams were incorporated into the new structure, but are now hidden under new layers of concrete. By the time it was finished, however, Tom Miller Dam was already overshadowed by the much larger LCRA dams built upstream that formed the Texas Highland Lakes. For the last seventy years, Lake Travis (Mansfield Dam) and Lake Buchanan (Buchanan Dam), have provided water, hydroelectric power, and flood control for Central Texas.

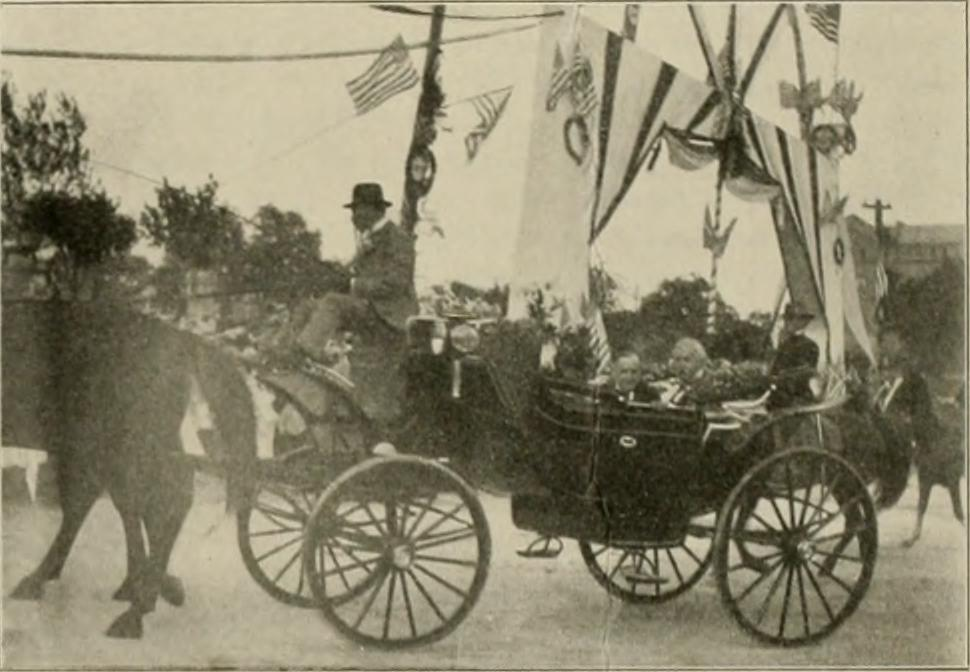
The first US president to visit Austin, William McKinley pictured here with Texas governor Joseph D. Sayers, did so to great fanfare

Between 1880 and 1920 Austin's population grew threefold to 34,876, but the city slipped from fourth largest in the state to tenth largest. The state's surging industrial development, along with Columbus Marion "Dad" Joiner striking oil 257 miles (410 km) east of Austin in Kilgore, spawning at the worlds largest oil field, the East Texas oil boom, helped propel Texas’s booming oil business, passed Austin by. The capital city began boosting itself as a residential city, but the heavy municipal indebtedness incurred in building the dam resulted in the neglect of city services. On December 20, 1886, the Driskill Hotel opened at 6th and Brazos, giving Austin its first premier hotel. The hotel would close and reopen many times in subsequent years. In 1905 Austin had few sanitary sewers, virtually no public parks or playgrounds, and only one paved street. Three years later Austin voters overturned the alderman form of government, by which the city had been governed since 1839, and replaced it with commission government. Wooldridge headed the reform group voted into office in 1909 and served a decade as mayor, during which the city made steady if modest progress toward improving residential life. The Littefield and Scarborough buildings at 6th and Congress downtown also opened that year, representing the city's first skyscrapers. In 1910, the city opened the concrete Congress Avenue Bridge across the Colorado River and, by the next year, had extended the streetcar line to South Austin along South Congress Avenue. The fostered development south of the river for the first time, allowing for development of Travis Heights in 1913.

In 1918 the city acquired Barton Springs, a spring-fed pool that became the symbol of the residential city. Upon Wooldridge's retirement in 1919 the flaws of commission government, hidden by his leadership, became apparent as city services again deteriorated. At the urging of the Chamber of Commerce, Austinites voted in 1924 to adopt council-manager government, which went into effect in 1926 and remains in effect today. Progressive ideas like city planning and beautification became official city policy. A 1928 city plan, the first since 1839, called upon Austin to develop its strengths as a residential, cultural, and educational center. A $4,250,000 bond issue, Austin's largest to date, provided funds for streets, sewers, parks, the city hospital, the first permanent public library building, and the first municipal airport, which opened in 1930. A recreation department was established, and within a decade it offered Austinites a profusion of recreational programs, parks, and pools.

=== Race and the 1928 City Plan ===
Front cover of the 1928 Austin city plan

By the early years of the 20th century, African-Americans occupied settlements in various parts of the city of Austin. By and large, these residential communities had churches at their core. Some had black-run businesses and schools for African-American youth. Though surrounded by Anglo neighborhoods, these island enclaves functioned as fairly autonomous residential neighborhoods often organized around family ties, common religious practices, and connection to pre-emancipation slave-status relationships with common slave holders/land owners. Though some date back to slavery, by the 1920s these communities were located across the city and include Kincheonville (1865), Wheatville (1867), Clarksville (1871), Masonville, St. Johns, Pleasant Hill, and other settlements.

While residences of blacks had been widely scattered all across the city in 1880, by 1930 they were heavily concentrated in East Austin, a process encouraged by the 1928 Austin city plan, which recommended that East Austin be designated a "Negro district." City officials implemented the plan successfully, and most blacks who had been living in the western half of the city were "relocated" back to the former plantation lands, on the other side of East Avenue (now Interstate 35). Municipal services like schools, sewers, and parks were made available to blacks in East Austin only. At mid-century Austin was still segregated in most respects—housing, restaurants, hotels, parks, hospitals, schools, public transportation—but African Americans had long fostered their own institutions, which included by the late 1940s some 150 small businesses, more than thirty churches, and two colleges, Tillotson College and Samuel Huston College. Between 1880 and 1940 the number of black residents grew from 3,587 to 14,861, but their proportion of the overall population declined from 33% to 17%.

Austin's Hispanic residents, who in 1900 numbered about 335 and composed just 1.5% of the population, rose to 11% by 1940, when they numbered 9,693. By the 1940s most Mexican-Americans lived in the rapidly expanding East Austin barrio south of East Eleventh Street, where increasing numbers owned homes. Hispanic-owned business were dominated by a thriving food industry. Though Mexican Americans encountered widespread discrimination—in employment, housing, education, city services, and other areas—it was by no means practiced as rigidly as it was toward African-Americans.

Between the 1950s and 1980s ethnic relations in Austin were transformed. First came a sustained attack on segregation. Local black leaders and political-action groups waged campaigns to desegregate city schools and services. In 1956 the University of Texas became the first major university in the South to admit blacks as undergraduates. In the early 1960s students staged demonstrations against segregated lunch counters, restaurants, and movie theaters. Gradually the barriers receded, a process accelerated when the United States Civil Rights Act of 1964 outlawed racial discrimination in public accommodations. Nevertheless, discrimination persisted in areas like employment and housing. Shut out of the town's political leadership since the 1880s, when two blacks had served on the city council, African-Americans regained a foothold by winning a school-board seat in 1968 and a city-council seat in 1971. This political breakthrough was matched by Hispanics, whose numbers had reached 39,399 by 1970, or 16 percent of the population. Mexican-Americans won their first seats on the Austin school board in 1972 and the city council in 1975.

=== Growth during the Great Depression ===
During the early and mid-1930s, Austin experienced the harsh effects of the Great Depression. Nevertheless, the town fared comparatively well, sustained by its twin foundations of government and education and by the political skills of Mayor Tom Miller, who took office in 1933, and United States Congressman Lyndon Baines Johnson, who won election to the U.S. House of Representatives in 1937. Its population grew at a faster pace during the 1930s than in any other decade during the 20th century, increasing 66 percent from 53,120 to 87,930. By 1936 the Public Works Administration had provided Austin with more funding for municipal construction projects than any other Texas city during the same period. UT nearly doubled its enrollment during the decade and undertook a massive construction program. In addition, the Robert Mueller Municipal Airport opened its doors for commercial air traffic in 1930.

Over three decades after the original Austin Dam collapsed, Governor Miriam A. "Ma" Ferguson signed the bill that created the Lower Colorado River Authority (LCRA). Modeled after the Tennessee Valley Authority, the LCRA is a nonprofit public utility involved in managing the resources along the Highland Lakes and Colorado River. The old Austin Dam, partially rebuilt under Mayor Wooldridge but never finished due to damage from flooding in 1915, was finally completed in 1940 and renamed Tom Miller Dam. Lake Austin stretched twenty-one miles behind it. Just upriver the much larger Mansfield Dam was completed in 1941 to impound Lake Travis. The two dams, in conjunction with other dams in the Lower Colorado River Authority system, brought great benefits to Austin: cheap hydroelectric power, the end of flooding that in 1935 and on earlier occasions had ravaged the town, and a plentiful supply of water without which the city's later growth would have been unlikely. In 1942 Austin gained the economic benefit of Del Valle Army Air Base, later Bergstrom Air Force Base, which remained in operation until 1993.

=== Post-War growth and its consequences ===
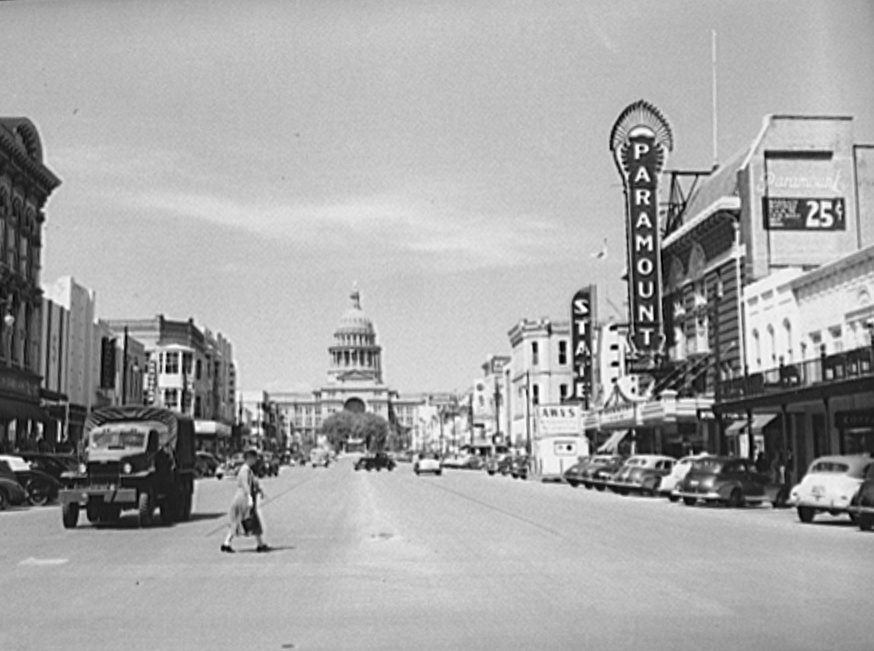
Congress Avenue in 1943

From 1940 to 1990 Austin's population grew at an average rate of 40 percent per decade, from 87,930 to 472,020. By 2000 the population was 656,562. The city's corporate area, which between 1891 and 1940 had about doubled to 30.85 square miles, grew more than sevenfold to 225.40 square miles by 1990. During the 1950s and 1960s much of Austin's growth reflected the rapid expansion of its traditional strengths—education and government. During the 1960s alone the number of students attending the University of Texas at Austin doubled, reaching 39,000 by 1970. Government employees in Travis County tripled between 1950 and 1970 to 47,300. University of Texas buildings multiplied, with the Lyndon Baines Johnson Library opening in 1971. A complex of state office buildings was constructed north of the Capitol. Propelling Austin's growth by the 1970s was its emergence as a center for high technology. This development, fostered by the Chamber of Commerce since the 1950s as a way to expand the city's narrow economic base and fueled by proliferating research programs at the University of Texas, accelerated when IBM located in Austin in 1967, followed by Texas Instruments in 1969 and Motorola in 1974. Two major research consortia of high-technology companies followed during the 1980s, Microelectronics and Computer Technology Corporation and Sematech. By the early 1990s, the Austin–Round Rock–San Marcos Metropolitan Statistical Area had about 400 high-technology manufacturers. While high-technology industries located on Austin's periphery, its central area sprouted multi-storied office buildings and hotels during the 1970s and 1980s, venues for the burgeoning music industry, and, in 1992, a new convention center.

On August 1, 1966, UT student and former Marine Charles Whitman killed both his wife and his mother before ascending the UT Tower and opening fire with a high-powered sniper rifle and several other firearms. Whitman killed or fatally wounded 14 more people over the next 90 minutes before being shot dead by police.

=== 1970 to 1989 ===
During the 1970s and 1980s, the city experienced a tremendous boom in development that temporarily halted with the Savings and Loan crisis in the late 1980s. The growth led to an ongoing series of fierce political battles that pitted preservationists against developers. In particular the preservation of Barton Springs, and by extension the Edwards Aquifer, became an issue that defined the themes of the larger battles.

Austin's rapid growth generated strong resistance by the 1970s. Angered by proliferating apartment complexes and traffic flow, neighborhood groups mobilized to protect the integrity of their residential areas. By 1983 there were more than 150 such groups. Environmentalists organized a powerful movement to protect streams, lakes, watersheds, and wooded hills from environmental degradation, resulting in the passage of a series of environmental-protection ordinances during the 1970s and 1980s. A program was inaugurated in 1971 to beautify the shores of Town Lake (now named Lady Bird Lake), a downtown lake impounded in 1960 behind Longhorn Crossing Dam. Historic preservationists fought the destruction of Austin's architectural heritage by rescuing and restoring historic buildings. City election campaigns during the 1970s and 1980s frequently featured struggles over the management of growth, with neighborhood groups and environmentalists on one side and business and development interests on the other. As Austin became known as a location for creative individuals, corporate retail branches also moved into town and displaced many "home-grown" businesses. To many longtime Austinites, this loss of landmark retail establishments left a void in the city's culture. In the 1970s, Austin became a refuge for a group of country and western musicians and songwriters seeking to escape the music industry's corporate domination of Nashville. The best-known artist in this group was Willie Nelson, who became an icon for what became the city's "alternate music industry"; another was Stevie Ray Vaughan. In 1975, Austin City Limits premiered on PBS, showcasing Austin's burgeoning music scene to the country.

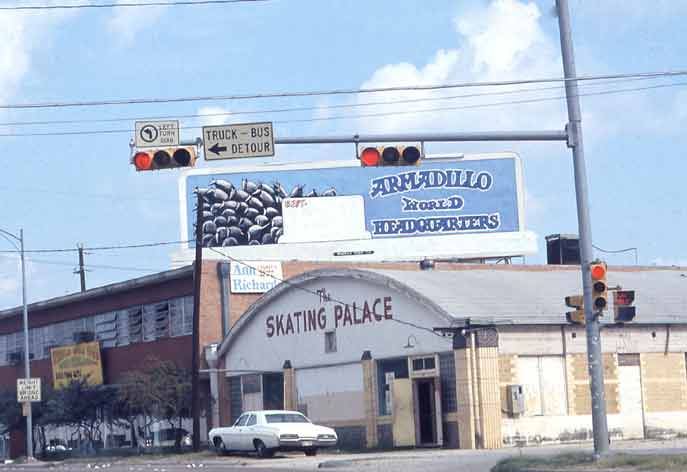
The Armadillo World Headquarters in 1976

The Armadillo World Headquarters gained a national reputation during the 1970s as a venue for these anti-establishment musicians as well as mainstream acts. In the following years, Austin gained a reputation as a place where struggling musicians could launch their careers in informal live venues in front of receptive audiences. This ultimately led to the city's official motto, "The Live Music Capital of the World".

=== 1990 to present ===
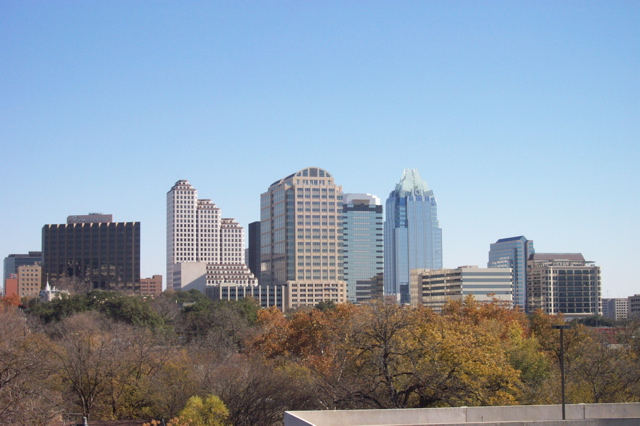
Downtown high-rises viewed from the west

In the 1990s, the boom resumed with the influx and growth of a large technology industry. Initially, the technology industry was centered around larger, established companies such as IBM, but in the late 1990s, Austin gained the additional reputation of being a center of the dot-com boom and subsequent dot-com bust. Austin is also known for game development, filmmaking, and popular music. On May 23, 1999, Austin-Bergstrom International Airport served its first passengers, replacing Robert Mueller Municipal Airport. In 2000, Austin became the center of an intense media focus as the headquarters of presidential candidate and Texas Governor George W. Bush. The headquarters of his main opponent, Al Gore, were in Nashville, thus re-creating the old country music rivalry between the two cities.

Also in the 2000 election, Austinites narrowly rejected a light rail proposal put forward by Capital Metro. In 2004, however, they approved a commuter rail service from Leander to downtown along existing rail lines. Capital MetroRail service finally began service in 2010.

In 2004, the Frost Bank Tower opened in the downtown business district along Congress Avenue. At 515 feet (157 m), it was the tallest building in Austin by a wide margin, and was also the first high rise to be built after September 11, 2001. Several other high-rise downtown projects, most residential or mixed-use, were underway in the downtown area at the time, dramatically changing the appearance of downtown Austin, and placing a new emphasis on downtown living and development.

In 2006, the first sections of Austin's first toll road network opened. The toll roads were extolled as a solution to underfunded highway projects, but also decried by opposition groups who felt the tolls amounted in some cases to a double tax. Now in 2025 there are 10 toll roads 1 thru 4 are the most expensive tolls in Austin SH 130 toad roll section 1-4 are which is one of the most expensive toll roads in the USA.

In March 2018, a series of four bombings centered in Austin, killed two civilians and injuring another five.

In 2019, the city adopted the Austin Strategic Mobility Plan (ASMP) as its long-term transportation strategy. The plan focuses on improving mobility, reducing traffic congestion and decreasing the city's reliance on automobiles. Key initiatives include expanding pedestrian and bicycle infrastructure, enhancing public transit services and promoting road safety with the goal of eliminating traffic fatalities. The ASMP also aims to support environmental sustainability and address the transportation challenges associated with Austin's growing population.

Presently, In 2025 Austin has a population of 989,252. Austin is currently growing at a rate of 0.48% annually and its population has increased by 2.43% since the most recent census, which recorded a population of 965,827 in 2022. Austin continues to rise in popularity and experience rapid growth. Young people in particular have flooded the city, drawn in part by its relatively strong economy, its reputation of liberal politics and alternative culture in Middle America, and its relatively low housing costs compared to the coastal regions of the country. Austin has also become a hub for a growing music scene, and has even adopted a motto of being the "Live Music Capital of the World." The sudden growth has brought up several issues for the city, including urban sprawl, as well as balancing the need for new infrastructure with environmental protection. Most recently, the city has pushed for smart growth, mostly in downtown and the surrounding neighborhoods, spurring the development of new condominiums in the area and altering the city's skyline. While Smart Growth has been successful in revitalizing downtown and the surrounding central city neighborhoods housing development has not kept pace with demand driven by rapid and sustained employment growth which has resulted in higher housing costs.

Austin continues to maintain its liberal political landscape with its mayor Kirk Watson. He won his first term in a 1997 election and was reelected to office in 2022 with 50.4% of the vote. As of 2025, Watson is serving his third term as mayor after serving in the Texas Senate. He is a member of the Democratic Party and his main areas of focus pertain to cost of living, homelessness, and transportation through the city.

== See also ==
- Timeline of Austin, Texas
- Capital Metropolitan Transportation Authority for a history of public transportation in Austin
