= Smith Rock =

Smith Rock may refer to:

- Smith Rock State Park, a park in Central Oregon, U.S., famous for rock climbing
- Smith Rock Shelter, limestone overhang in McKinney Falls State Park near Austin, Texas, U.S.

== See also ==
- Smith Rocks (Antarctica)
- Will Smith–Chris Rock slapping incident (Smith–Rock slap)
