= Allens Boots =

Retail store in Austin, Texas

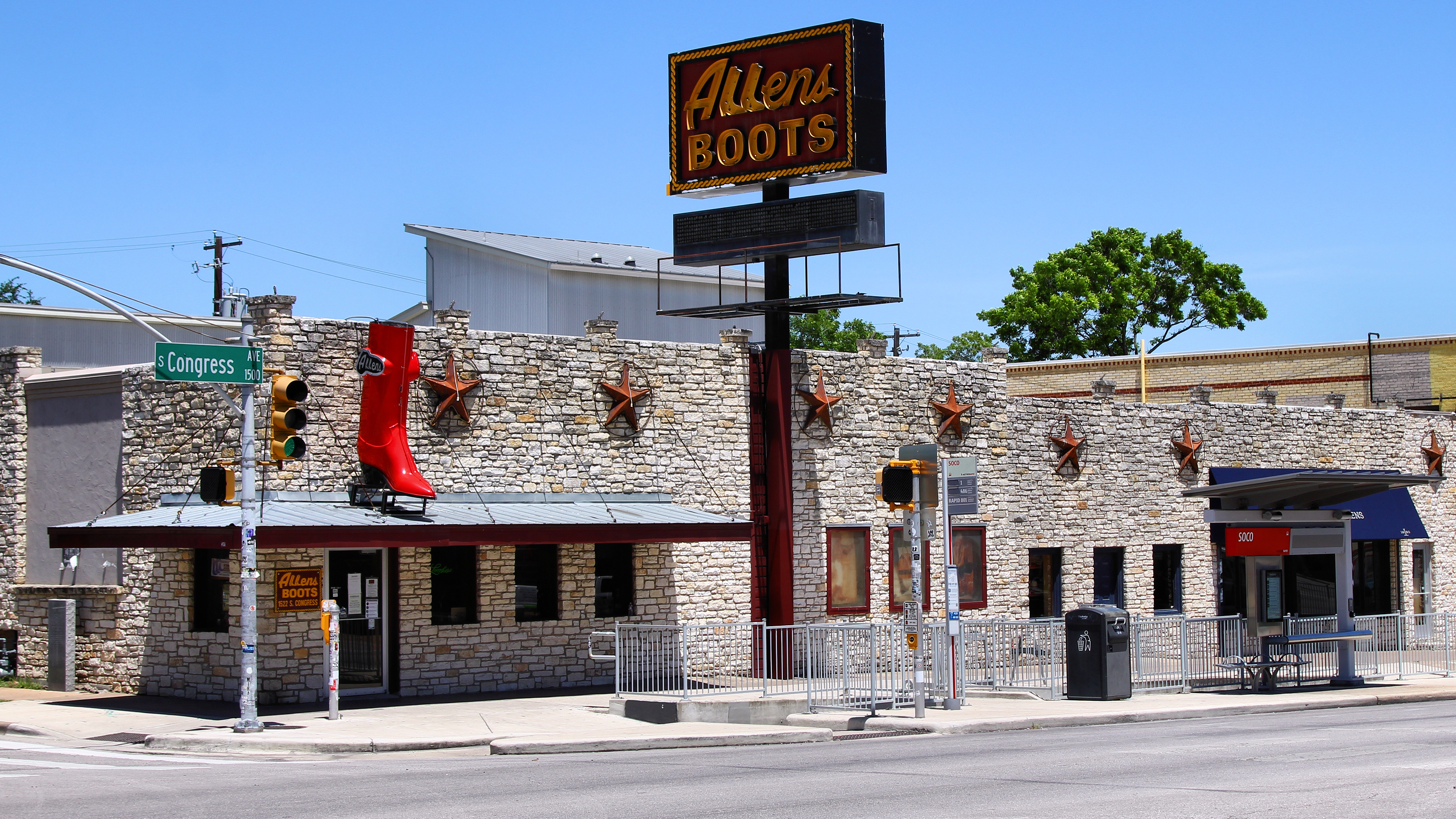
- Industry: Retail (Western wear)
- Founded: 1977 (Austin, Texas)
- Headquarters: Austin, Texas
- Products: Western wear: boots, hats, shirts, jeans
- Website: allensboots.com

Allens Boots is a retail store in Austin, Texas, that specializes in western wear. The store offers items such as cowboy boots, hats, jeans, and shirts.

== History ==
Allens Boots opened in 1977; the big, red boot above the entrance has since made the store easy to spot among the many other boutiques and shops along South Congress Avenue.

Allens Boots is a popular shopping destination for musicians, movie stars, and celebrities.

== See also ==
- Bean boots
