= Waterloo Records =

Music store in Austin, Texas, US

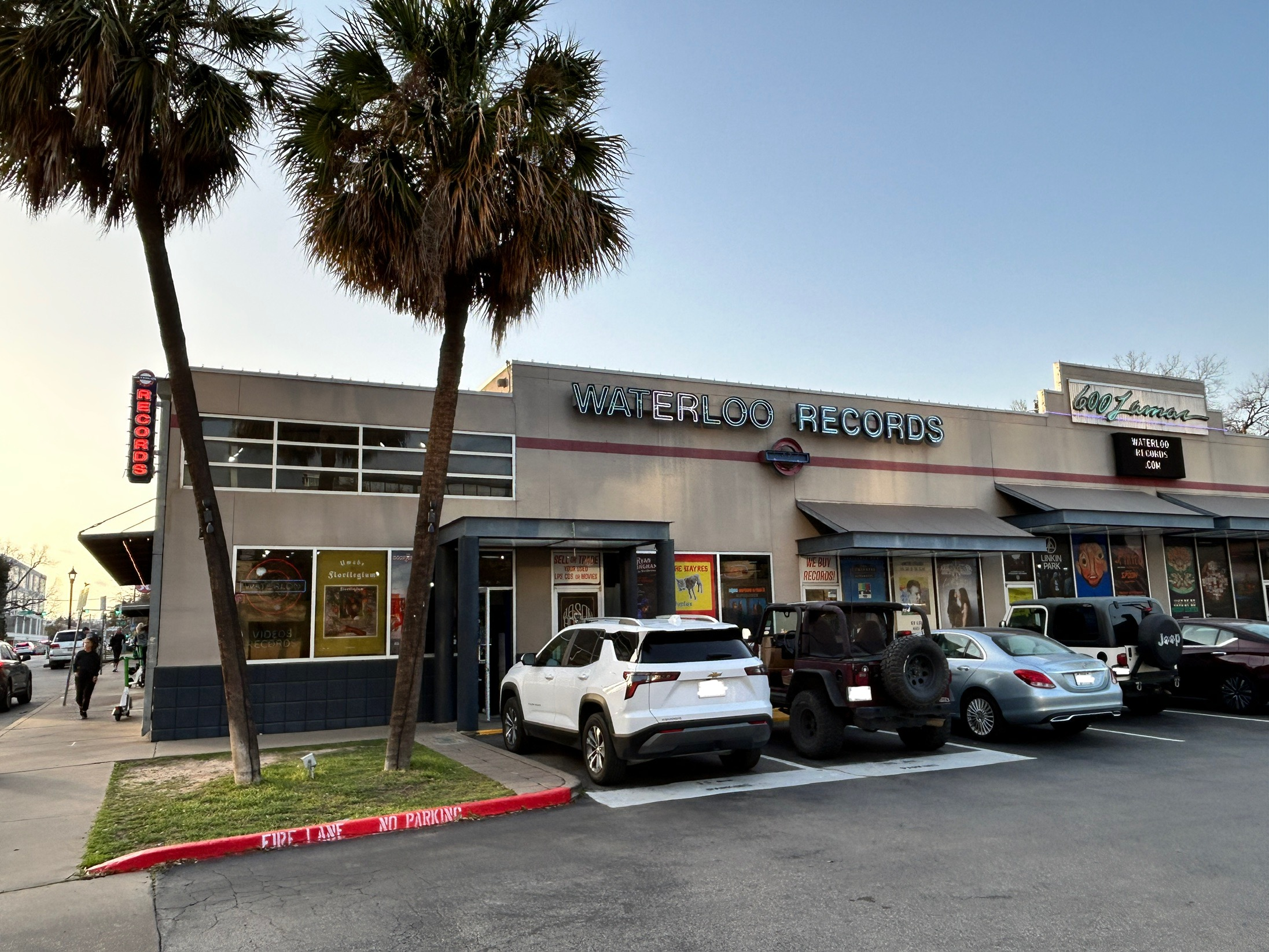
Waterloo Records storefront, March 2025.

Waterloo Records is an independent music and video retailer in Austin, Texas. Founded by Louis Karp in 1982, it has been an integral part of the city's music scene since then. The store provides a large selection of new and used CDs, vinyl records, DVDs, Blu-rays, turntables, music-related magazines, t-shirts, and other memorabilia. Waterloo is known for its knowledgeable staff, the ability to listen to anything in the store, and its support of Texas music. The shop employs more than 40 people who are all musicians or well-versed music enthusiasts.

== History ==
Waterloo Records opened on April 1, 1982, in a 1,200-square-foot building at 221 South Lamar Boulevard, founded by Louis Karp. John Kunz, who had managed a competing record store, joined Waterloo as a partner that October and became its sole owner in 1987. The store moved to 600A North Lamar Boulevard, at the corner of West Sixth Street, in 1989. It takes its name from Waterloo, the original name of Austin, briefly adopted in 1839 after the city was designated the capital of the Republic of Texas.

The strip mall housing the store at Sixth and Lamar was purchased by the Austin real estate firm Endeavor Real Estate in 2019 and slated for redevelopment, leaving Waterloo on a month-to-month lease while Kunz sought a new location. In January 2025, after 42 years of ownership, Kunz announced that he was selling the business. The new owners are Caren Kelleher, founder of Gold Rush Vinyl, and the Austin entrepreneur and record-label owner Trey Watson, with Kunz remaining as chair emeritus. The store relocated to 1105 North Lamar Boulevard in August 2025, a former Louis Shanks furniture store that is 50 percent larger and has more parking and a larger stage for in-store performances. All staff were retained and offered the option of part ownership.

== In-store performances ==
Waterloo regularly hosts in-store performances featuring live performances by local and internationally known artists of all genres, especially during the South by Southwest conferences and festivals during which they host up to 10 bands a day at their festival. Past in-store performers have included Willie Nelson, The Stooges, Sonic Youth, Nirvana, Spoon, Steve Earle, My Morning Jacket, Cheap Trick, Jeff Buckley, My Bloody Valentine, Sebadoh, Alejandro Escovedo (a former Waterloo Records employee), Queens of the Stone Age, Norah Jones, Iron and Wine, The Shins, Animal Collective, Grizzly Bear, Bill Callahan, The Black Angels, Deertick, Wild Flag, St. Vincent, The Sword, Billy Squier, Man Man, and thousands more.

"It is a real town square," John Kunz, Waterloo's longtime owner, said. "A place for the music makers and the music lovers to connect. And the music makers love it as much as the music lovers."

== Recognition ==
The Austin Chronicle gave Waterloo Records its "Best Record Store" award in 1982 and in each of the following 40 years. The store has also received national coverage from The Wall Street Journal, The New York Times and the BBC. It is frequently listed alongside similar stores such as California's Amoeba Music as one of the best record stores in the United States.

== See also ==
- List of companies based in Austin, Texas
