= Ann W. Richards Congress Avenue Bridge =

Bridge in Austin, Texas

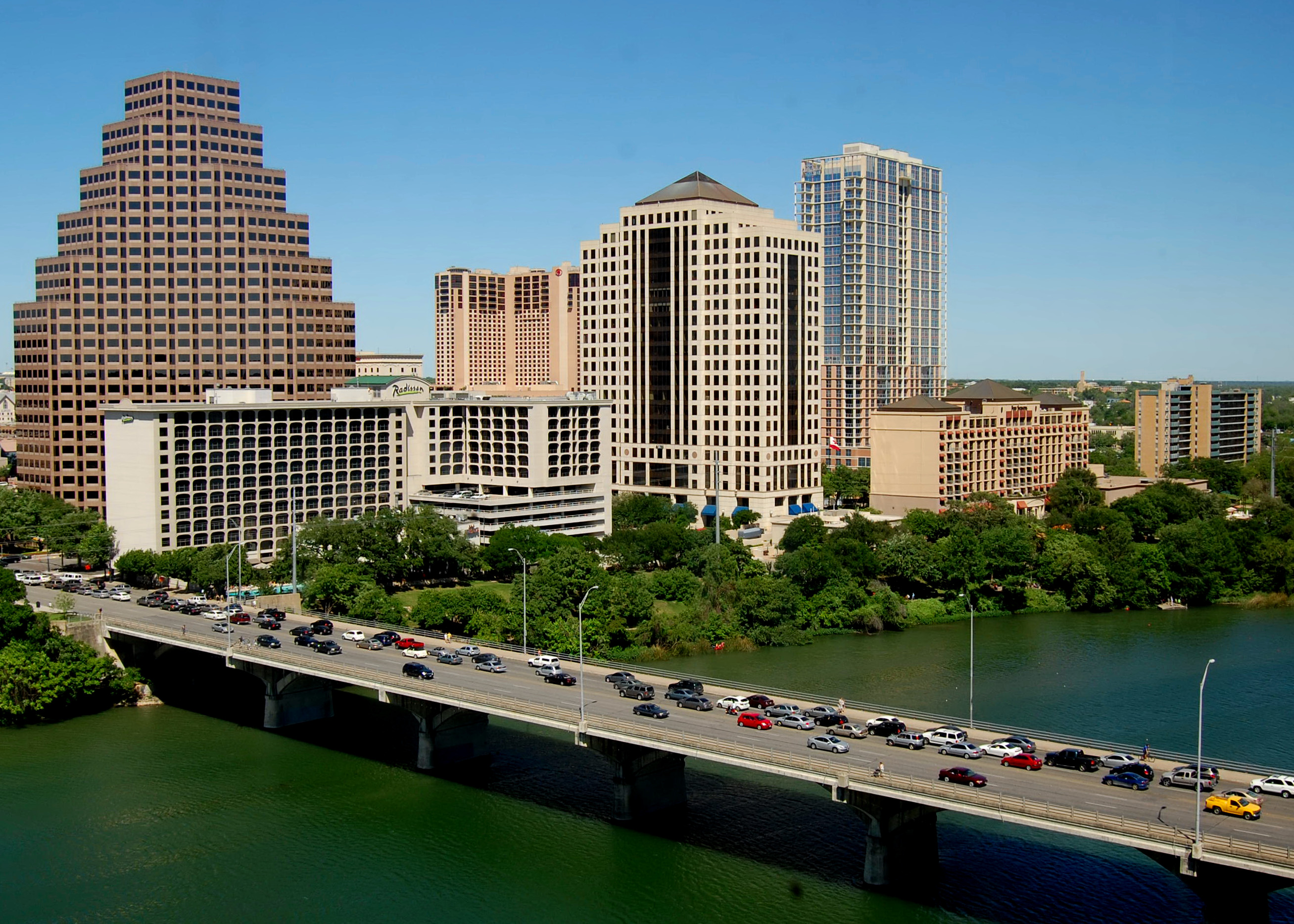
- Coordinates: 30.26126°N 97.74531°W
- Carries: Motor vehicles, pedestrians, and bicycles
- Crosses: Lady Bird Lake
- Locale: Austin, Texas
- Official name: Ann W. Richards Congress Avenue Bridge
- Other name(s): Congress Avenue Bridge; South Congress Avenue Bridge
- Maintained by: City of Austin
- ID number: TXNBI 142270B00425007

Characteristics
- Design: Arch bridge
- Material: Concrete
- Total length: 945.9 feet (288.3 m)
- Width: 60 feet (18 m)
- Longest span: 119.1 feet (36.3 m)

History
- Opened: April 4, 1910

Statistics
- Toll: Free both ways

Location
- Interactive map of Ann W. Richards Congress Avenue Bridge

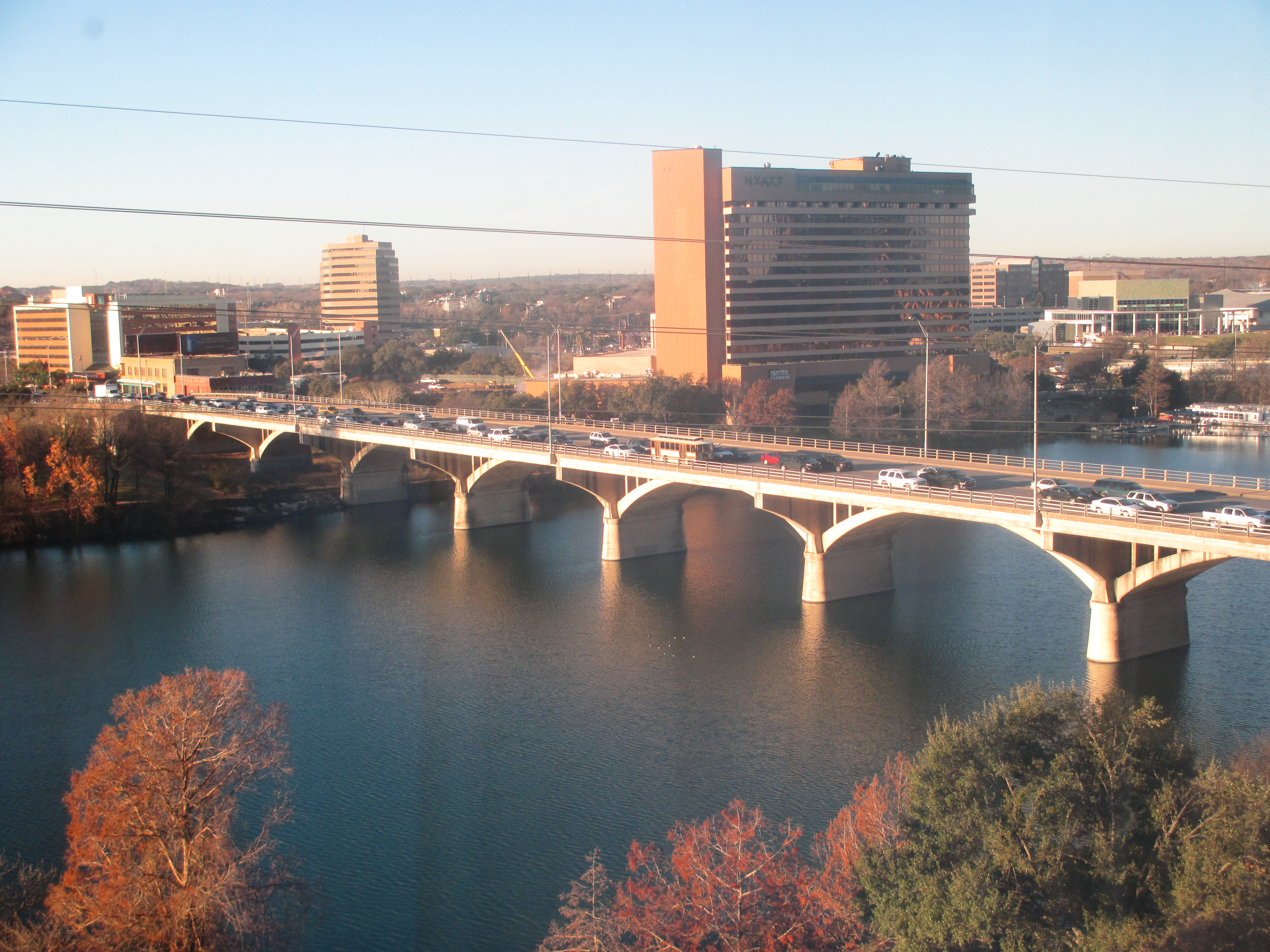
Another view of afternoon traffic on the Ann W. Richards Bridge in Austin, Texas (2013)

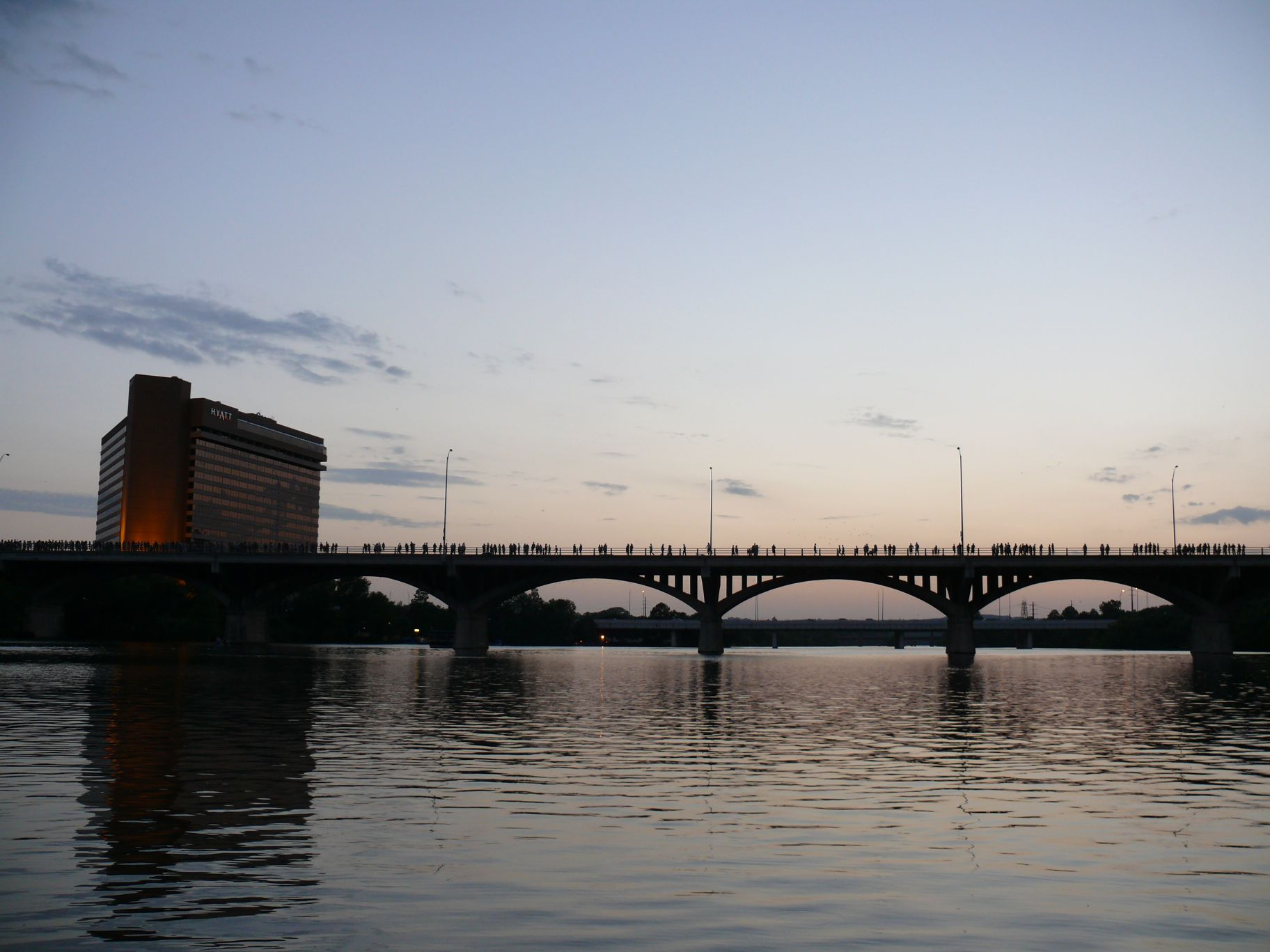
The Richards Bridge at dusk

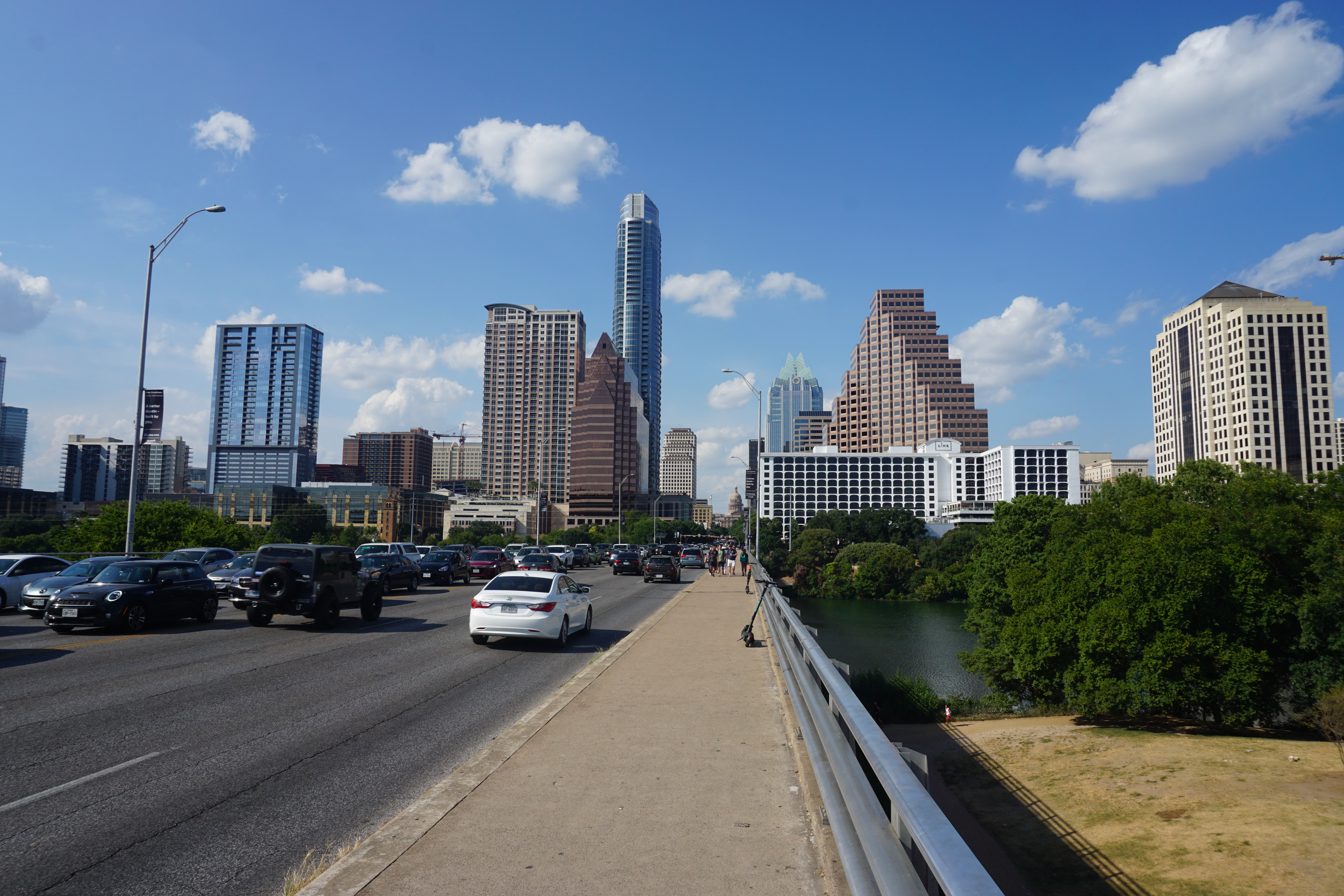
View from the Richards Bridge

The Ann W. Richards Congress Avenue Bridge (formerly known simply as the Congress Avenue Bridge) crosses over Lady Bird Lake in Austin, Texas. Before construction of the Longhorn Dam was completed in 1960, the bridge crossed the Colorado River from which Lady Bird Lake is impounded. The bridge was known as the Congress Avenue Bridge from the construction of the first span across the Colorado River at that location in the late 19th century until November 16, 2006, when the Austin City Council renamed the current bridge in honor of Ann W. Richards, the 45th Governor of Texas and a long-term resident of Austin. The bridge is a concrete arch bridge with three southbound and three northbound vehicle lanes and sidewalks on both sides of the bridge.

The bridge currently serves as a habitat for the world's largest urban bat colony. This particular colony is a maternity colony, which means it provides a roosting place for pregnant female bats during the spring season. The females then raise their pups in this location from mid-summer to fall. Male bats are not present under the bridge until after the pups are born.

== History ==
The first bridge across the Colorado River in this location was constructed in 1869 or 1871. The original structure was a pontoon toll bridge. In 1875, a new wooden toll bridge was constructed across the river. Bridge construction was finished at a cost of $80,000; an additional $20,000 was used to macadamize dykes across lowlands and a culvert over Bouldin Branch. On one occasion, a herd of cattle caused a span 50 feet above the water to give way. Only a few cattle were rescued.

On January 22, 1884, a modern iron bridge funded by private interests was opened at a cost of $74,000. There were sufficient spans to allow for the highest stage of overflow when the river flooded. The bridge was designed and built by engineer C. Q. Horton. The bridge was purchased by the Travis County Road and Bridge Co. and the City of Austin on June 18, 1886. By 1891, the Travis County Road and Bridge Co. refused to care for the bridge, and Travis County Commissioners negotiated an agreement whereby the City of Austin assumed complete control of the operation of the bridge. The city was forced to repair the bridge in 1892 and again in 1897, when the city paid half the cost for reflooring, a task that took until 1901 to complete. The bridge was repainted in 1902.

By 1908, traffic across the bridge had increased to the point where a new bridge was needed. Plans for a new concrete arch bridge were drawn as follows: "New Bridge: 910 FT Long iron bridge; 6 spans { 5-150FT Long, 1-160, 27 FT. Tall, 18 FT. Roadway, Bridge Piers are 45 FT. above ground. Will be built by King Bridge Co. of Cleveland, Ohio. Strength: 2,000 LBS per FT. – But was built four times as strong". The new bridge was opened on April 4, 1910, at a final cost of $208,950.10. Sections of the old iron bridge were later used in 1915 and 1922 to rebuild the bridge at nearby Moore's Crossing.

The bridge was rehabilitated in 1980.

On November 16, 2006, the Austin City Council renamed the structure the Ann W. Richards Congress Avenue Bridge at its weekly meeting. Richards was also a part-time Austin resident and former Travis County Commissioner.

== Bats ==
Ann W. Richards Congress Avenue Bridge is home to the world's largest urban bat colony, which is composed of Mexican free-tailed bats. The bats reside beneath the road deck in gaps between the concrete component structures. They are migratory, spending their summers in Austin and the winters in Mexico. According to Bat Conservation International, between 750,000 and 1.5 million bats reside underneath the bridge each summer.

In March 1986, Merlin Tuttle, founder of Bat Conservation International, resigned from his position as Curator of Mammals at the Milwaukee Public Museum in Wisconsin and relocated his fledgling conservation organization to Austin, which had been making national headline news for its urban bat population. At the time, the Congress Avenue Bridge bats were widely unpopular and the colony was at risk of extermination. Tuttle's public education campaign to save the bats through dispelling myths and misconceptions about their threats to the citizens of Austin was met with widespread skepticism and earned him the 1986 Texas Monthly Bum Steer Award. However, with help from a coalition of leaders in the Austin community, the Public Health Department, and news media, Tuttle's persistent education efforts successfully reversed public opinion about the bats and turned the Congress Avenue Bridge bat colony into the highly profitable tourist attraction for the city of Austin that it is today.

The nightly emergence of the bats from underneath the bridge at dusk, and their flight across Lady Bird Lake primarily to the east, to feed themselves, attract as many as 100,000 tourists annually. Tourists can see the bats from the bridge, from the sides of the river and from boats.

A study made in 1999 by Gail R. Ryser and Roxana Popovici concludes that the economic impact of the bats to Austin city is $7.9 million each year. Today, businesses are using the bats as a symbol for Austin.

A project, called "Bats and Bridges", has been put in place by the Texas Department of Transportation, in cooperation with BCI, to study the best way to make bridges habitable for bats.

The Austin Ice Bats minor-league hockey team was named after the bridge's bats.

The song "Bats" by Kimya Dawson and rapper Aesop Rock was inspired by the immense number of bats that reside under the bridge.

Ozzy Osbourne features the Congress bridge bats in his music video for his song "Patient Number 9".

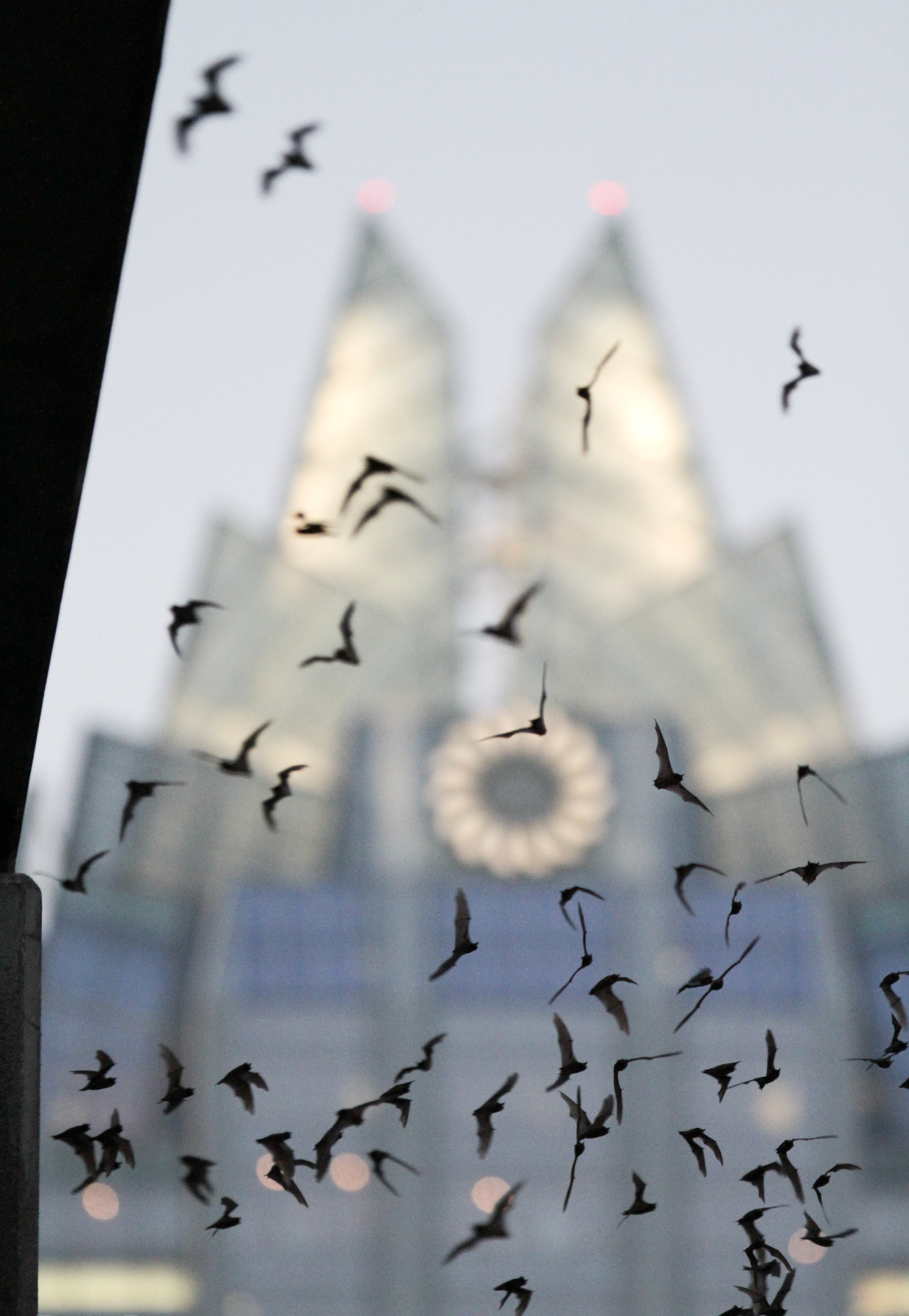
Bridge bats from below

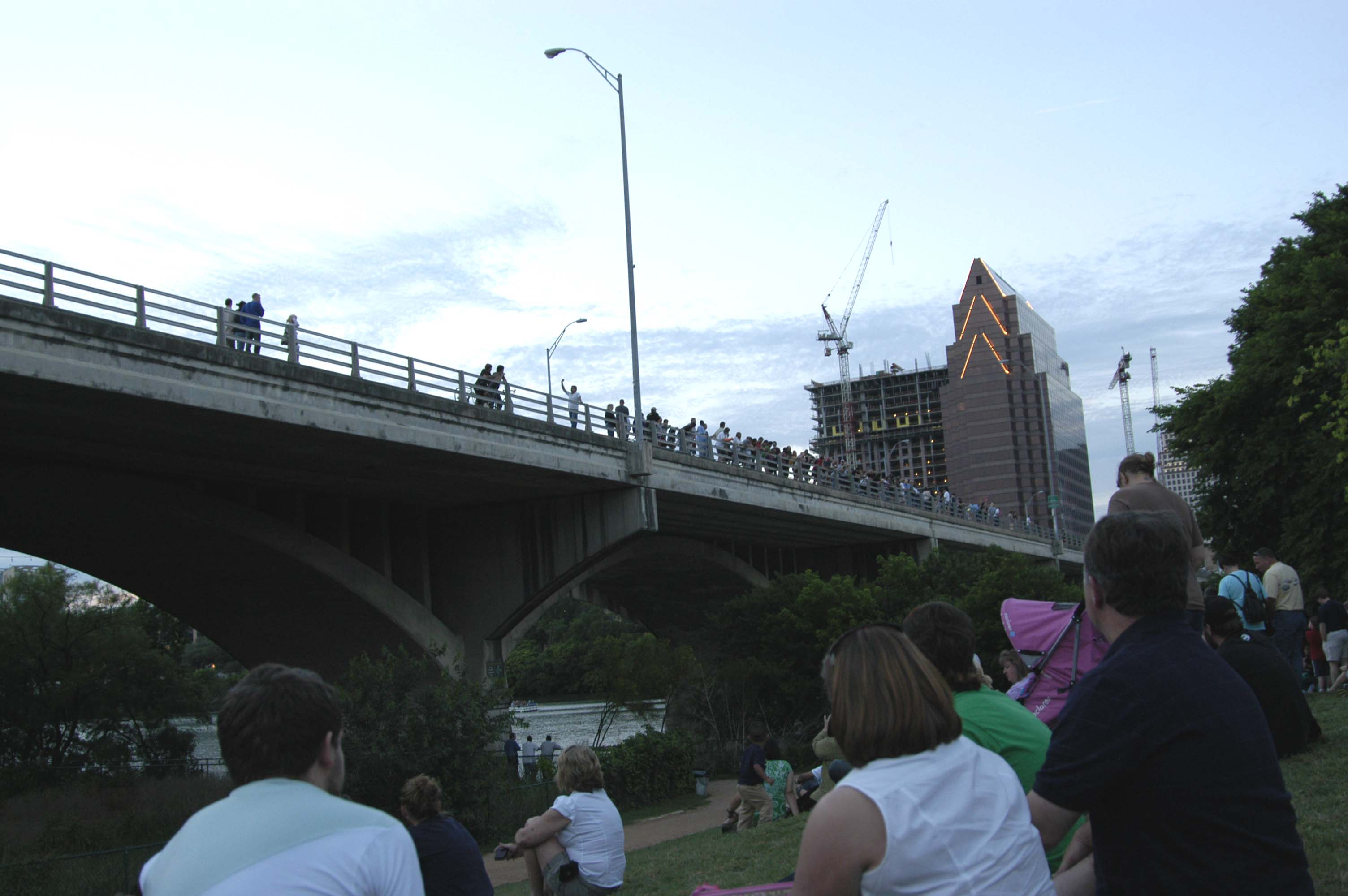
Tourists waiting for the bats.

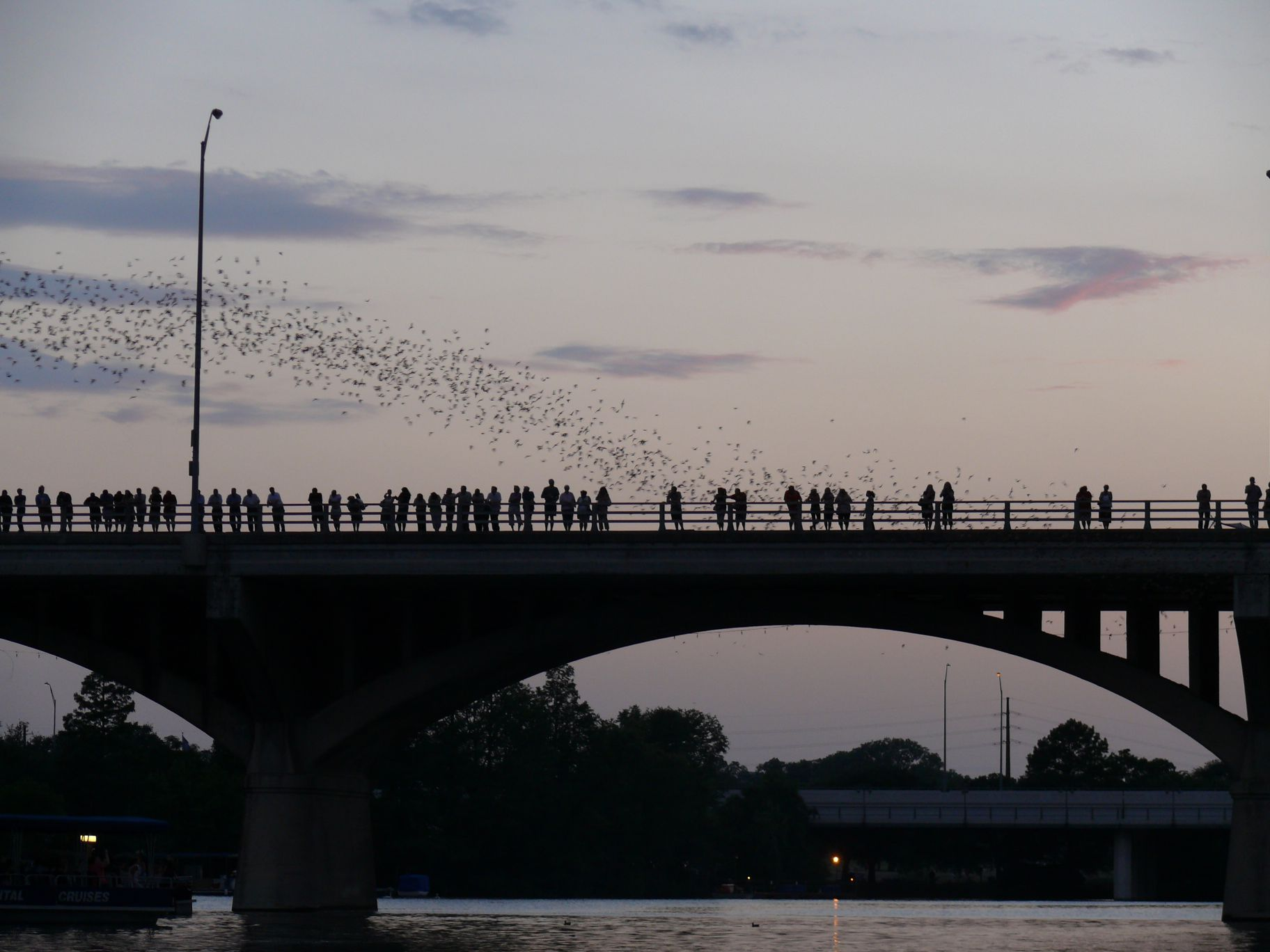
The emergence of the bats

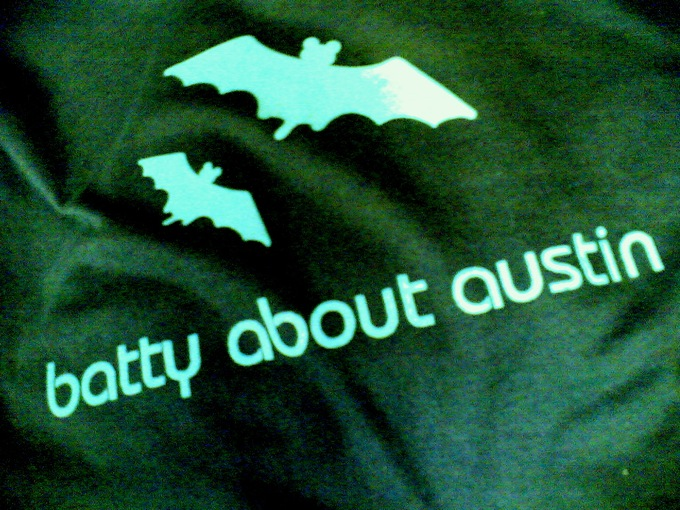
The bridge bats have become an integral part of Austin's cultural identity.

== See also ==
- Congress Avenue
- South Congress
- List of crossings of the Colorado River
