= Congress Avenue Historic District =

Historic district in Texas, United States

Congress Avenue
- Part of: Loop 275
- Maintained by: City of Austin
- Length: 8.5 mi (13.7 km)
- Location: Austin, Texas, United States
- South end: Slaughter Lane
- Major junctions: Loop 343
- East end: Martin Luther King Jr. Boulevard
- Congress Avenue Historic District
- U.S. National Register of Historic Places
- U.S. Historic district
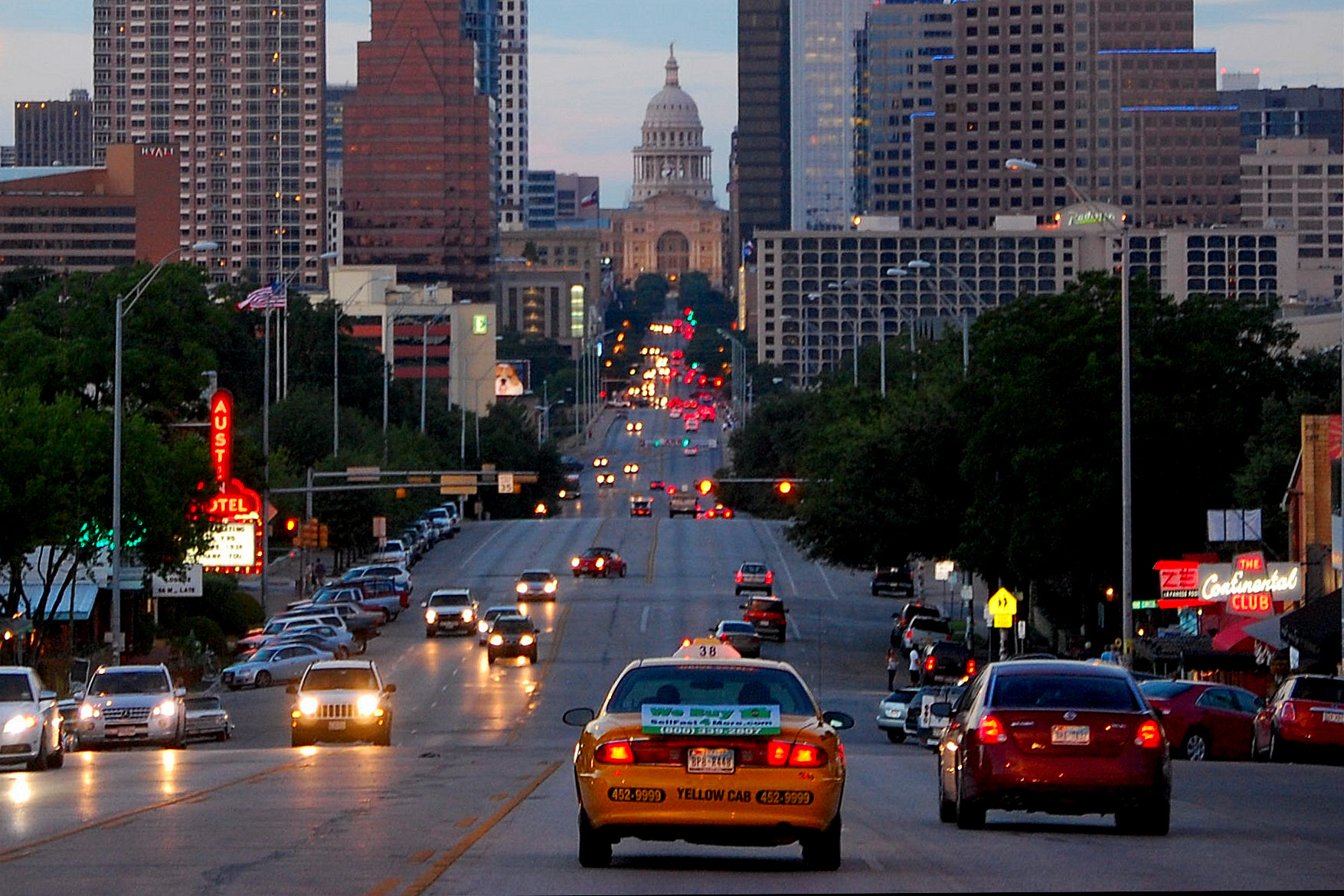
- Downtown Austin and the State Capitol as seen from Congress Avenue.
- Location: Congress Ave. from 1st to 11th Sts., Austin, Texas
- Coordinates: 30°16′4″N 97°44′33″W
- Area: 38.3 acres (15.5 ha)
- Built: 1839
- Architect: Multiple
- Architectural style: Late Victorian, Skyscraper
- NRHP reference No.: 78002989
- Added to NRHP: August 11, 1978

Congress Avenue is a major thoroughfare in Austin, Texas. The street is a six-lane, tree lined avenue that cuts through the middle of the city from far south Austin and goes over Lady Bird Lake leading to the Texas State Capitol in the heart of Downtown.

Congress Avenue south of Lady Bird Lake is known as South Congress, often abbreviated to SoCo, and is an increasingly popular shopping and rental district. It passes the historic Travis Heights neighborhood, the Texas School for the Deaf, and St. Edward's University as it passes south out of town.

== History ==
The original 1839 Waller Plan for the city designed Congress Avenue to be Austin's central and most prominent street, and named in honor of the Republic-era Congress. Early structures along Congress Avenue included government buildings, hotels, saloons, retail stores and restaurants. By the late 1840s after statehood, "The Avenue" formed a well-established business district. The mid-1870s introduced gaslight illumination and mule-driven streetcars as well as construction of a new Travis County courthouse at Eleventh Street. The present Texas Capitol at the north end of Congress Avenue was built in 1888. The original dirt street was bricked in 1910. Trolley cars operated on the Avenue until 1940.

Before Interstate 35 was completed in the 1960s, Congress Avenue was the primary road to reach Austin from the south. Certain landmarks such as the Austin Motel identify the road as a major thoroughfare for travellers through the mid-20th century.

== Route description ==
Congress Avenue begins at an intersection with Slaughter Lane near Interstate 35. It heads to the north-northeast, diverging away from I-35. This portion of Congress from Slaughter Lane north to the Williamson Creek bridge is maintained by the Texas Department of Transportation and carries the Loop 275 designation. After the intersection with Stassney Lane, the road heads to the northeast, now parallel to I-35. Congress Avenue passes over the US 290/SH 71 freeway (locally called Ben White Boulevard) as it travels to the northeast. Continuing to the northeast, it passes by St. Edward's University and goes through the namesake South Congress district before crossing over Lady Bird Lake (Colorado River) by way of the Ann W. Richards Congress Avenue Bridge. The street continues northeast through downtown Austin to 11th Street at the Texas State Capitol. At the Capitol, it splits into a one-way pair, with the northbound lanes going around the east side of the Capitol, and the southbound lanes going around the west side. (This portion of Congress between 11th and 15th Streets has been permanently closed to auto traffic since 2001.) The street merges back to a 2-way street northeast of the Capitol and continues heading to the northeast. It continues for several more blocks before coming to an end at the University of Texas at Austin campus at Martin Luther King Jr Boulevard.

== Junction list ==
The entire highway is in Austin, Travis County.

mi	km	Destinations	Notes
0.0	0.0	Slaughter Lane	Southern terminus of Congress Avenue; TxDOT sign this as the southern terminus of Loop 275
0.9	1.4	Foremost Drive	
1.2	1.9	Dittmar Road	
1.9	3.1	William Cannon Drive	
2.2	3.5	Eberhart Lane / Circle South Road	
2.8	4.5	Stassney Lane	
3.2	5.1	Crossing over Williamson Creek; TxDOT sign this as the northern terminus of Loop 275	
4.2	6.8	US 290 / SH 71 (Ben White Boulevard)	No direct access from US 290 west/SH 71 north to Congress Avenue or from Congress Avenue to US 290 east/SH 71 south
4.7	7.6	Lightsey Road / Woodward Street	
5.4	8.7	Oltorf Street	
6.7	10.8	Crossing over East Bouldin Creek	
6.8	10.9	Riverside Drive	
7.1	11.4	Crossing over the Colorado River (Lady Bird Lake)	
7.2	11.6	Cesar Chavez Street	Southern end of historic district segment
7.6	12.2	Sixth Street	
7.9	12.7	11th Street	Northern terminus; northern end of historic district segment
8.2	13.2	15th Street	
8.5	13.7	Martin Luther King Jr. Boulevard	Northern terminus of Congress Avenue
1.000 mi = 1.609 km; 1.000 km = 0.621 mi: Incomplete access

== Ann W. Richards Congress Avenue Bridge ==
The Ann W. Richards Congress Avenue Bridge over Lady Bird Lake houses the world's largest urban bat population. When the bridge was refurbished in the 1980s, the new design created crevices underneath the structure that happened to be ideal for bats to roost in. In the summer, the colony has up to 1.5 million Mexican Free-tailed Bats. The bats can be seen emerging by the thousands from under the bridge every evening throughout the summer, before they eventually migrate to Mexico for the winter.

== Recognition ==
In recognition of its architectural and historical significance, Congress Avenue from Cesar Chavez Street (formerly First Street) to the Capitol was listed in the National Register of Historic Places in 1979. The Capitol forms a terminating vista at the north end of Congress; this view became one of the Capitol View Corridors protected under state and local law from obstruction by tall buildings in 1983.

Cesar Chavez Street is the former First Street.

== In popular culture ==
Congress Avenue is the setting for Quentin Tarantino's 2007 film, Death Proof.

== See also ==
- South Congress
