= Travis Heights, Austin, Texas =

- Travis Heights-Fairview Park Historic District
- U.S. National Register of Historic Places
- U.S. Historic district
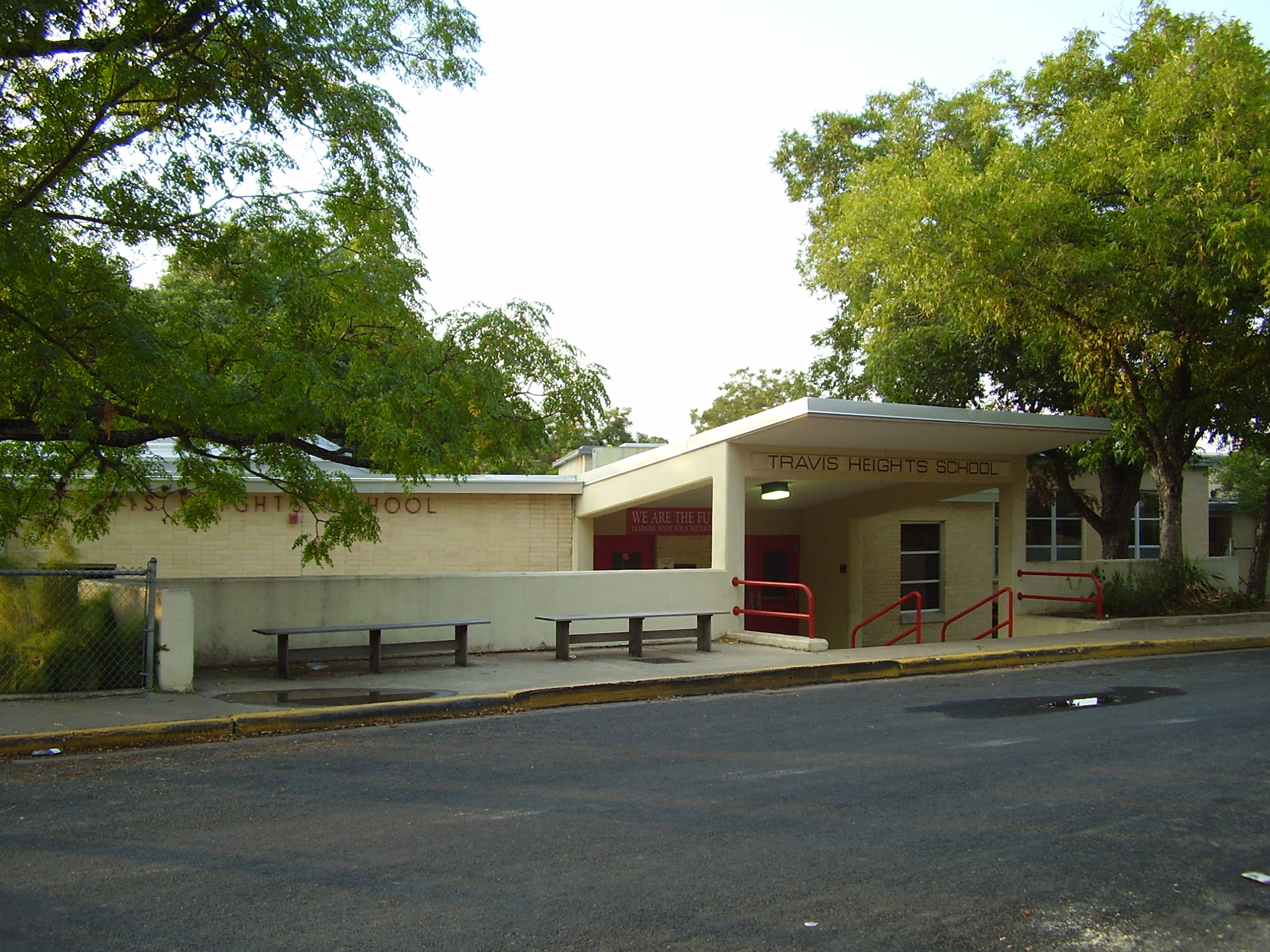
- Travis Heights Elementary School
- Location: Austin, Texas
- Coordinates: 30°14′30″N 97°44′30″W
- NRHP reference No.: 100006796
- Added to NRHP: July 30, 2021

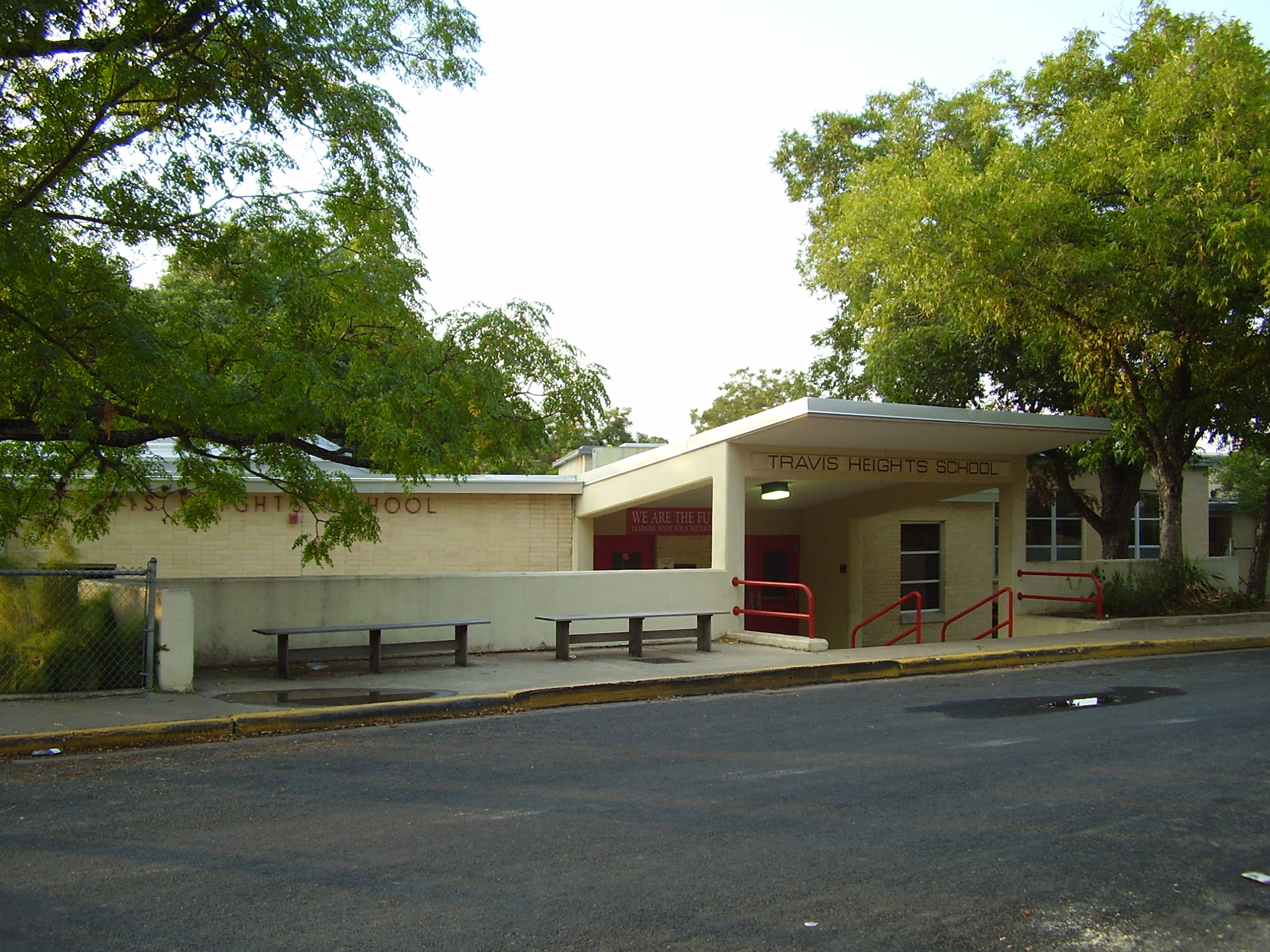
Travis Heights Elementary School

Travis Heights is a historic neighborhood in south Austin, Texas, United States, bounded by Lady Bird Lake on the north, Interstate 35 on the east, Congress Avenue on the west and Oltorf Street on the south. These boundaries include Fairview Park, an earlier suburb associated with the same developers, running from the west side of Blunn Creek to South Congress Avenue. Part of Travis Heights was stranded east of Interstate 35; many of the same streets to be found west of the highway continue east of it.

It was founded in 1912 by Newning, Swisher and General Stacy, but development did not expand rapidly until the 1920s. The city park located along Blunn Creek in Travis Heights was donated by Stacy and bears his name, Stacy Park, as does the "Big Stacy" spring-fed pool and the "Little Stacy" park and swimming pool, built as a WPA project during the Great Depression.

Fairview Park, an adjacent residential development, was established in the late 19th century. Development south of the Colorado River expanded more substantially in the 1920s with the growth of Travis Heights. The neighborhood contains a mixture of large historic houses, smaller homes, and apartment buildings, and is located near South Congress and Downtown Austin.

Another attraction of the neighborhood is its closeness to the newly rejuvenated South Congress Avenue, many times called SoCo. South Congress is full of hip cafes and stores, and attracts many tourists and young professionals from downtown.

Blunn Creek Nature Preserve is almost 40 acres in Travis Heights, central South Austin, with trails and historical plaques. Details of the history, including the natural history, of the creek and preserve can be found at this Austin Parks & Recreation web site.

Travis Heights is located in city council District 9.

== Education ==
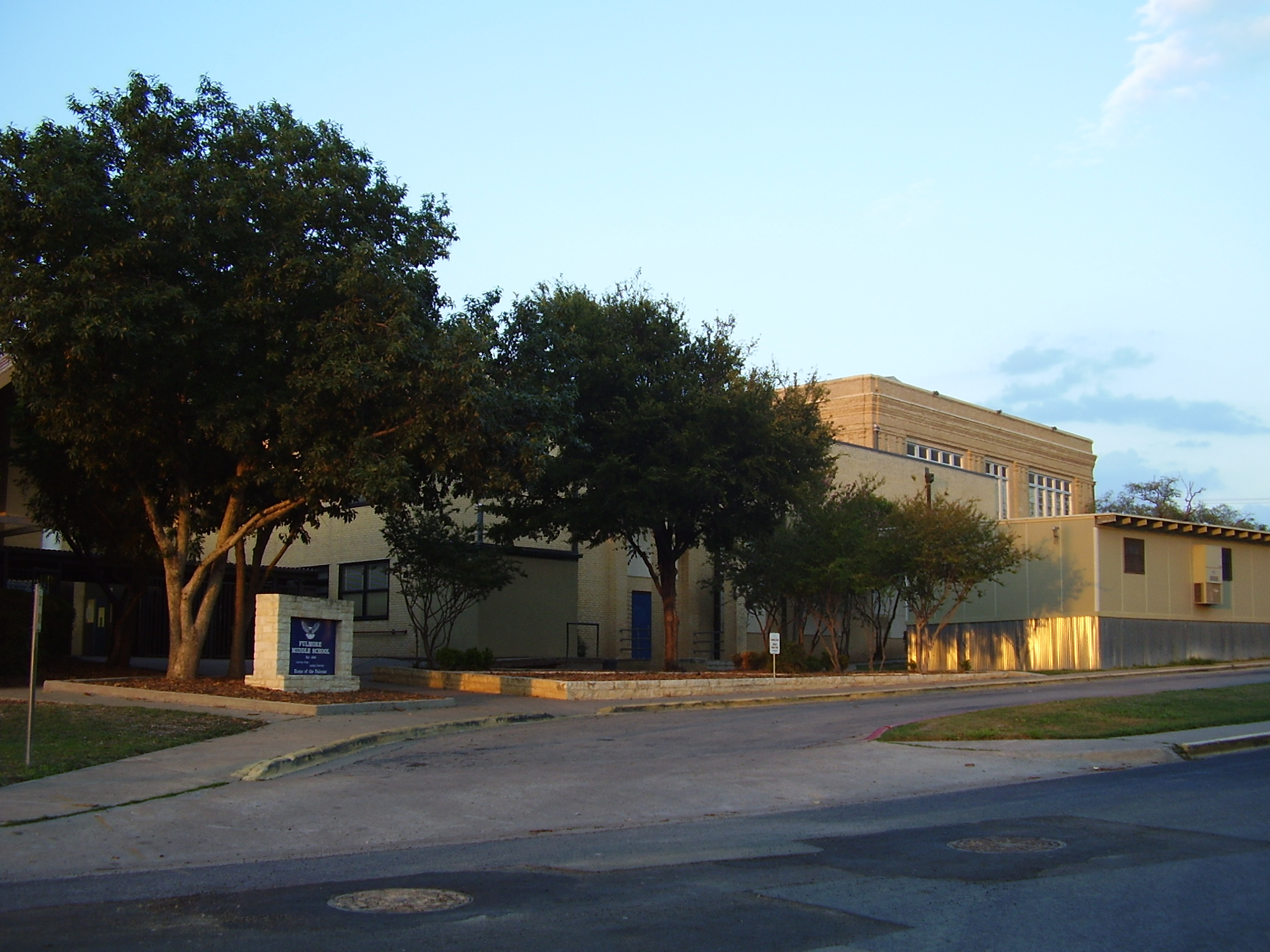
Lively Middle School

The neighborhood is zoned to the Austin Independent School District (AISD).

- Travis Heights Elementary School
- Sarah Lively Middle School
  - It was previously Fulmore Middle School, after former Confederate States of America soldier and judge of Travis County Zachary Taylor Fulmore. In 1886 a one room schoolhouse was made, and in 1911 its brick replacement arrived, with the Fulmore naming coming at that time. Alumni who attended in the 1960s through the 1980s, wishing to have a name not related to a Confederate figure, suggested naming the school after longtime teacher Sarah Ann Lively, who began teaching there in 1964. In 2018 six AISD board members voted to rename the school, one opposed, and one abstained. Lively died at age 88 on January 4, 2021.
- Travis High School
