= Smith Rock Shelter =

Archaeological site in Texas, US

- U.S. National Register of Historic Places
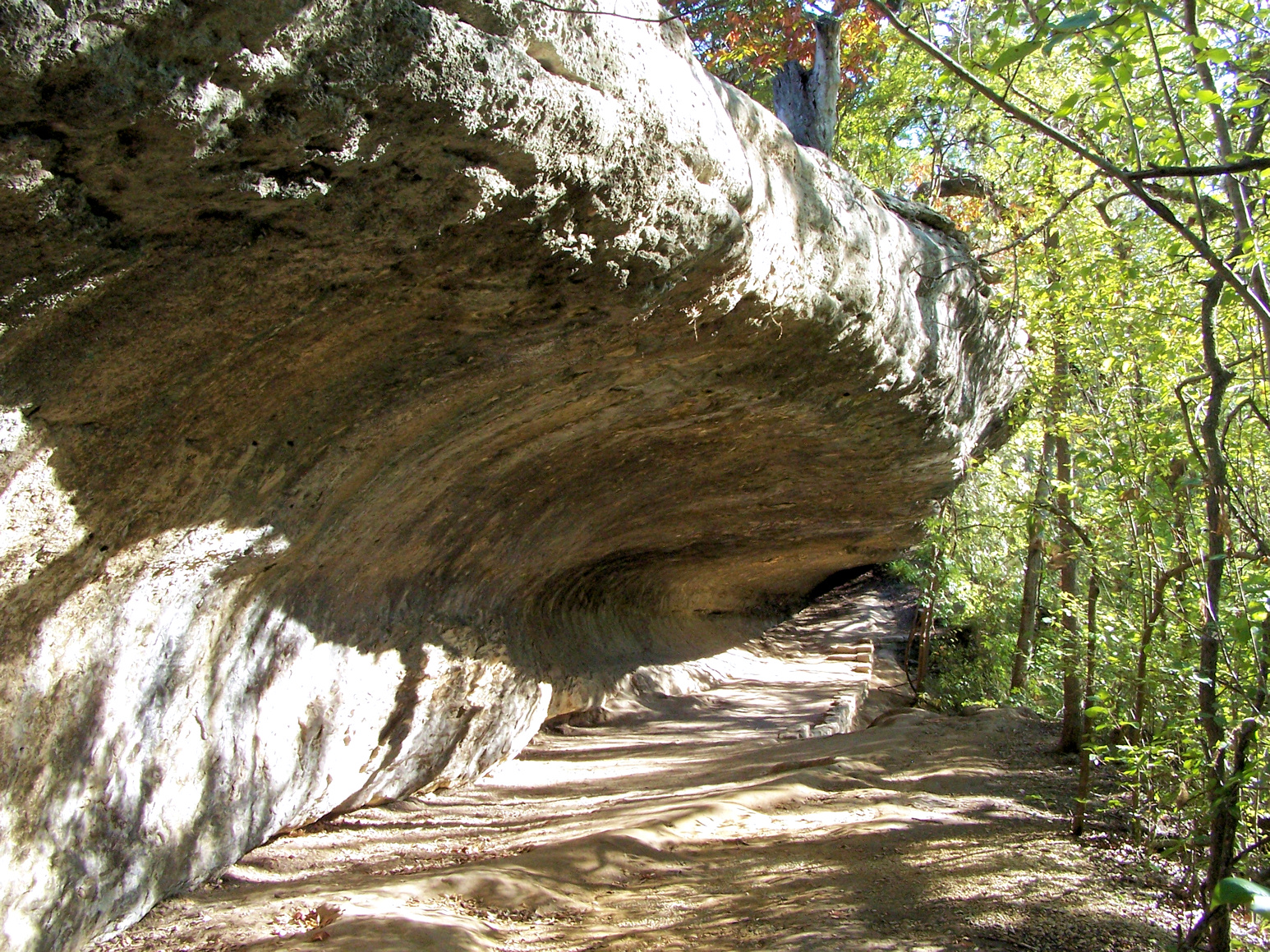
- The Smith Rock Shelter
- Location: Austin, Texas, USA
- Coordinates: 30°11′3.12″N 97°43′25.68″W
- NRHP reference No.: 74002095
- Added to NRHP: October 1, 1974

The Smith Rock Shelter is a natural limestone overhang in McKinney Falls State Park near Austin, Texas. The shelter is believed to have been used by Native Americans from 500 BCE until the 18th century. The last known occupants were related to the Tonkawa. It is accessible via the 0.8 miles (1.3 km) round-trip Smith Rockshelter Trail in the park.

The shelter abuts Onion Creek and is one of two natural rock shelters in Travis County to be listed on the National Register of Historic Places (the other is the Levi Rock Shelter). Smith Rock Shelter was added to the Register on October 1, 1974.
