= South Congress =

Coordinates: 30°15′N 97°45′W

South Congress SoCo
- Neighborhood
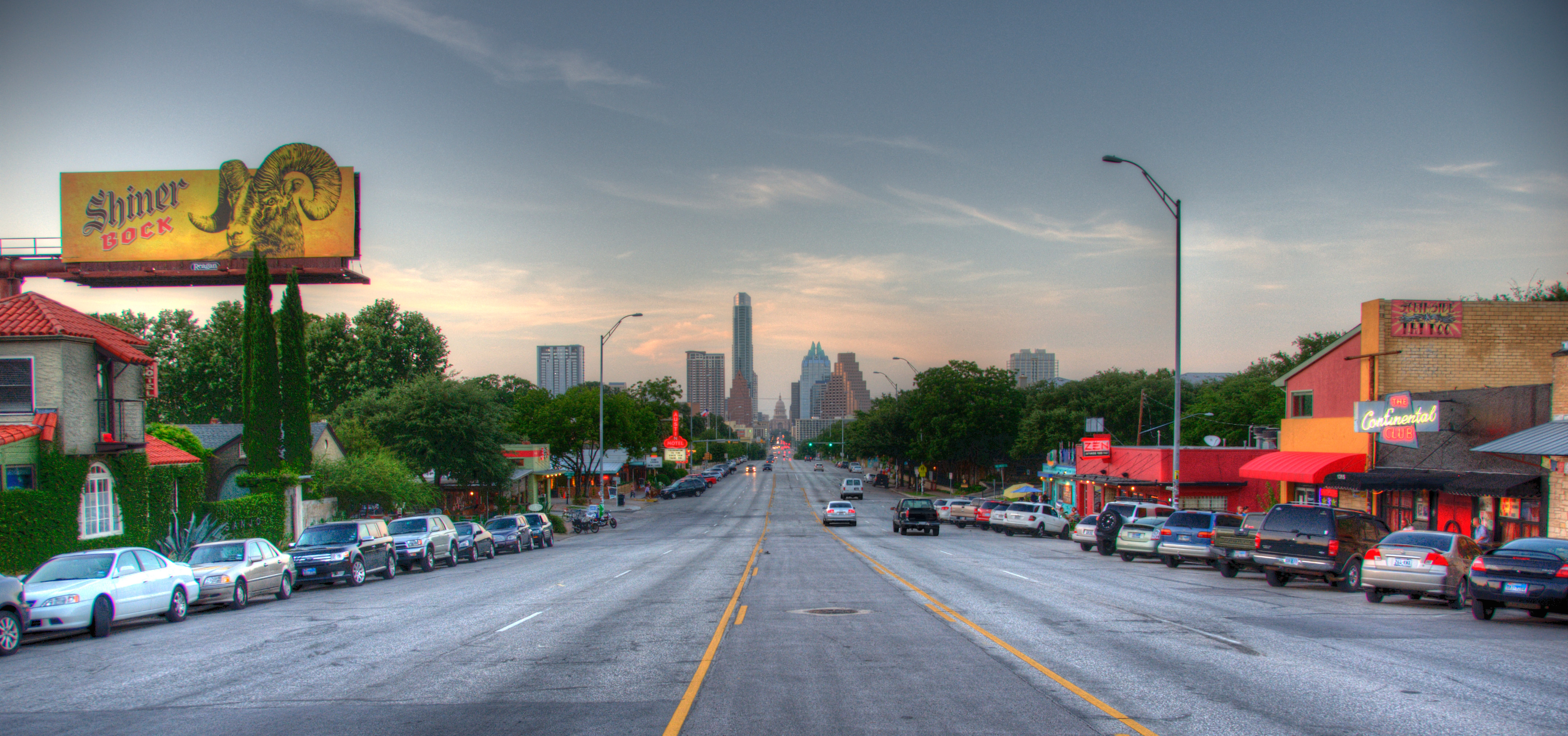
- South Congress Avenue leads directly into downtown Austin.
- Neighborhood Boundaries
- Country: United States
- State: Texas
- City: Austin
- Time zone: UTC-6 (CST)
  - Summer (DST): UTC-5 (CDT)
- ZIP Codes: 78704
- Area codes: 512, 737

South Congress (abbreviated SoCo) is a neighborhood located on South Congress Avenue in Austin, Texas known as a shopping and cultural district with many eclectic small retailers, restaurants, music and art venues and, more recently, food trucks.

South Congress begins at the Colorado River and Ann W. Richards Congress Avenue Bridge and runs due south towards Ben White Boulevard/TX-71. The area is bordered by two historic South Austin neighborhoods: Travis Heights to the east and Bouldin Creek to the west.

Since its humble beginnings in the 1850s, South Congress Avenue has been transformed from a rural country road to the capital city gateway and, finally, to the shopping district that it is today. Some Austinites attribute its enduring popularity to the unobstructed view of the Texas State Capitol.

== History ==
Edwin Waller designed Congress to be Austin's most prominent thoroughfare in the 1830s. However, Congress did not extend south of the Colorado River until 1852 when James Gibson Swisher donated land for a road that was both the postal route to Austin and the main highway to San Antonio. Growth along South Congress slowed during the 19th century; it was not until the completion of a concrete bridge in 1910 that South Austin had reliable transportation over the river. Rapid growth finally came to South Austin in the 1920s, as the streetcar was expanded down South Congress. As hundreds of bungalows were built in South Austin, more commercial enterprises began appearing south of the river - especially on South Congress. By 1931, South Congress was finally paved all the way from the river to the railroad at present-day Ben White Boulevard.

Many of South Congress's icons opened their doors between 1930 and 1960. The Austin Motel opened in 1938 and the Hotel San José shortly thereafter. The hamburger stand that would eventually become the legendary Night Hawk opened on South Congress in 1932. Another major development was the Twin Oaks Shopping Center at the northeast corner of Oltorf Road and South Congress. It was one of Austin's first "strip" shopping venues when it opened in 1954. South Austin opened further during the 1950s, as the Congress Avenue Bridge was widened and the construction of Interstate 35 provided an alternative north–south route.

During the 1970s, South Congress became a mecca for artists, musicians and their supporters. The legendary Armadillo World Headquarters opened at the corner of South Congress and Barton Springs Boulevard in 1970. Tourist traffic declined on South Congress with the rise of I-35 and many businesses fell into disrepair.

By the late 1980s, small eclectic retailers began popping up along the South Congress Corridor, attracted by cheap rent. The area's renaissance began at the intersection of South Congress and Monroe by putting their historic buildings to good use to attract eclectic retail business, arts and music venues and restaurants in the area. South Austin's first skyscrapers appeared at South Congress and Riverside Drive when two new hotels opened. 1988 was a watershed moment for the area, as Kent Cole and Diana Prechter fixed a beat-up wood-frame building that had operated as Flossie's bar and the Austex Lounge, and reopened it as Magnolia Cafe South. They said they were attracted by the "colorful people" and cheap rent.

Memories of drug dealers and prostitutes began to fade in the 1990s. Austin, a relatively small city for most of its history, suddenly enjoyed a tremendous economic boom that attracted new residents and drove an increased demand for older housing stock in the Travis Heights and Bouldin Creek neighborhoods. That in turn spurred massive renovation along South Congress and throughout old South Austin. The 1990s witnessed the redevelopment of the Austin Theatre, the H-E-B at Oltorf and South Congress and more. Perhaps the most ambitious renovation undertaken was the redevelopment of Penn Field from an industrial plant to a multi-use complex that includes office space, retail and residences. By the end of the decade, South Congress was well on its way to becoming a nationally known shopping and cultural district.

== Economy ==
The shopping district contains numerous shops, restaurants and music venues. There is a square featuring a number of food trucks serving tacos, falafel, cupcakes, and more. Notable retailers on South Congress include Allens Boots (1977), Lucy in Disguise with Diamonds (1984), Uncommon Objects (1992–2017) and Friends of Sound (1996–2016). Restaurants in the area include Guero's Taco Bar (1995), where Texas Radio Live is broadcast on Sun Radio every Wednesday evening, Home Slice Pizza (2005), South Congress Cafe (2003) and Hey Cupcake (2007). First Thursday is a community event held each month where businesses stay open to 10 p.m. or later to celebrate the neighborhood's boutiques, restaurants and galleries. The event is held on the first Thursday of every month between Barton Springs Road and Elizabeth Street.

Sweet Leaf Tea Company has its headquarters in the Penn Field Business Park in the South Congress neighborhood. The company moved to the South Congress neighborhood in 2007. The company moved to Penn Field in December 2009.

== Education ==
The neighborhood is zoned to the Austin Independent School District. The zoned schools are Travis Heights Elementary School, Lively Middle School, and Travis High School. Lively was built in 1911, Travis Heights was built in 1938, and Travis was built in 1953.

Austin Community College serves area residents. St. Edward's University is located on South Congress Avenue.

== Public transportation ==
CapMetro CapMetro Rapid Route 801 traverses South Congress Avenue providing express service to the rest of the city. Specifically, the route has stops at Auditorium Shores, SoCo, Oltorf, and St. Edward's stations. South Congress Transit Center at Ben White Boulevard also provides connection to other bus routes in the area. South Congress will be future served by the Orange Line light rail service as a part of Project Connect.

== See also ==
- Congress Avenue Historic District
