= Levi Rock Shelter =

- U.S. National Register of Historic Places
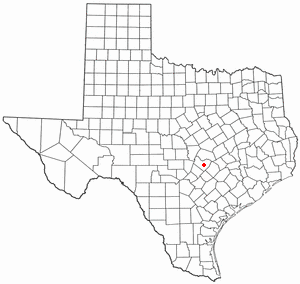
- Location: Travis County, Texas, USA
- Nearest city: Briarcliff, west of Austin, Texas, USA
- Coordinates: 30°22′53″N 98°5′17″W
- NRHP reference No.: 71000965
- Added to NRHP: June 21, 1971

The Levi Rock Shelter, named for former property owner Malcolm Levi, is an archeological site west of Austin, Texas where Paleo-Indian Native American artifacts dating back 10,000 years or more have been discovered.

Located along Lick Creek, the site was discovered in the mid-1950s and is believed to be the 7th-oldest paleolithic site in the United States. Many artifacts have been uncovered there, including Clovis points, carved bone cylinders, scrapers, awls, needles, punches, and incised and painted pebbles. Many are now in the care of the University of Texas.

The site, and its adjoining creek, are believed by local activists to be threatened by nearby development. The shelter was added to the National Register of Historic Places in 1971.
