= Otha Birkner =

American politician (1924–2018)

Member of the Texas House of Representatives from the 30th district
- In office January 10, 1967 – August 22, 1967
- Preceded by: Joshua Gale Gates
- Succeeded by: D.R. 'Tom' Uher

Member of the Texas House of Representatives from the 32nd district
- In office January 8, 1963 – January 10, 1967
- Preceded by: John Andrew Huebner
- Succeeded by: Bob Hendricks

Personal details
- Born: November 19, 1924 Manchaca, Texas
- Died: May 30, 2018 (aged 93) Bandera, Texas
- Party: Democratic

Otha Birkner (November 19, 1924 – May 30, 2018) was an American politician who served in the Texas House of Representatives from 1963 to 1967.

He died on May 30, 2018, in Bandera, Texas at age 93.
