= Travis Early College High School =

Public school in Austin, Texas, United States

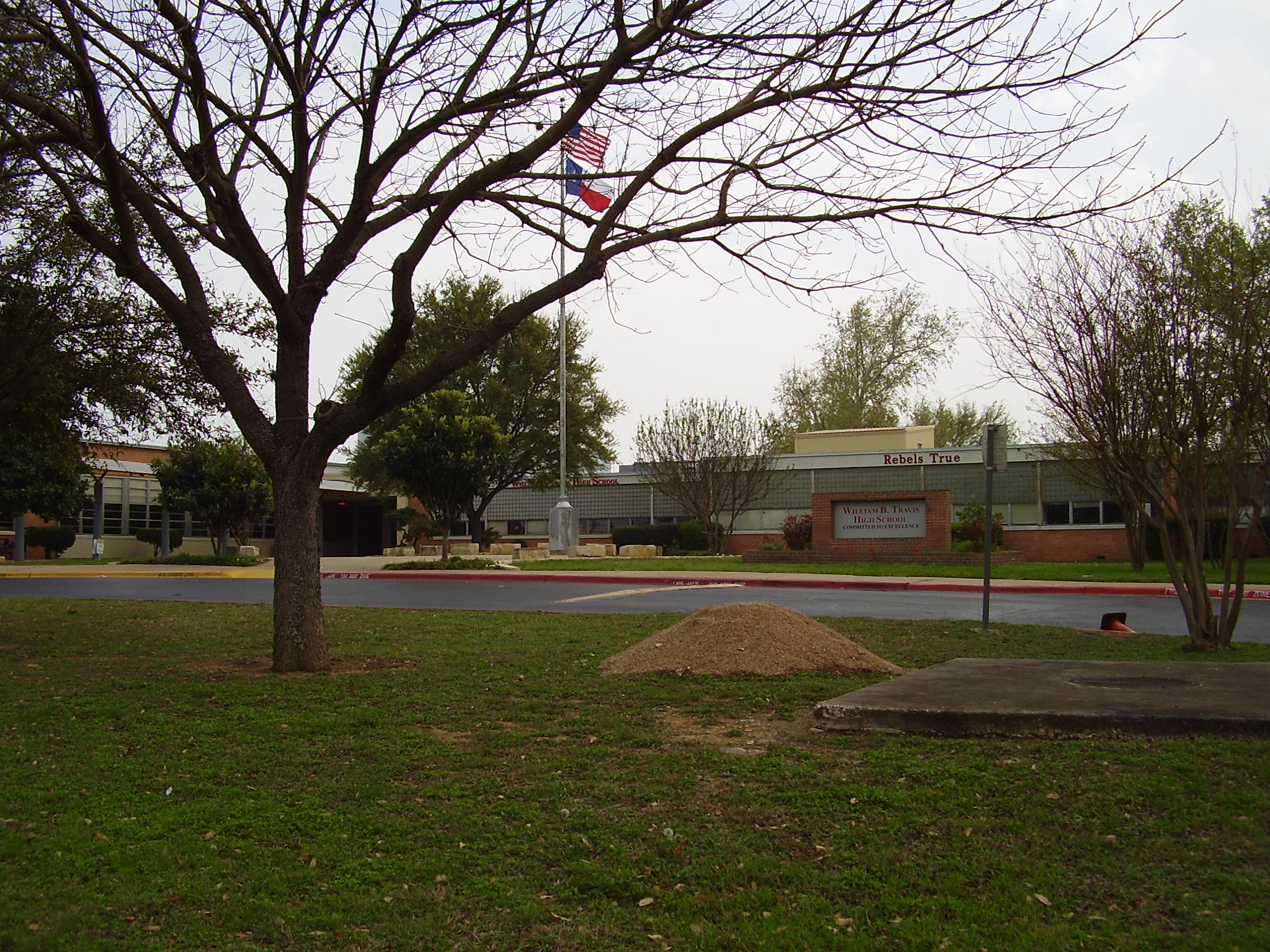

Location
- 1211 E. Oltorf St. Austin, Texas, 78704; 30.2337°N 97.7440°W

Information
- Motto: "Knowledge is power”
- Established: 1953
- School district: Austin Independent School District
- Principal: Cynthia Salinas (Interim)
- Teaching staff: 76.76 (FTE)
- Grades: 9-12
- Enrollment: 1,097 (2025-2026)
- Student to teacher ratio: 15.07
- Colors: Red & grey
- Athletics conference: UIL Class 4A
- Mascot: Rebel
- Team name: The Rebels, Runnin' Rebs, Lady Rebs
- Website: travis.austinschools.org

Travis Early College High School is a high school located in south Austin, Texas, United States, which is part of the Austin Independent School District. It was opened in 1953 and is named after William B. Travis, who was one of the commanding officers at the Battle of the Alamo. It is Austin's oldest high school south of the Colorado River.

As of November 2009, there were over 1,400 students enrolled. Travis' athletic teams are known as the Rebels, and their school colors are red and grey. The Navy JROTC program at THS is the largest ROTC program in Austin and currently has the best shooting team out of all the JROTC units in the state of Texas. As of February 2015, the JROTC program, for the first time, has qualified for state competition under the command of C/LCDR Martinez, the commanding officer. The school has also been selected as a mentor school by the Texas Education Agency.

In 2002, an Institute of Hospitality & Culinary Arts was opened at Travis.

== History ==
In 1966 the first five African-American students began attending Travis as part of desegregation; a total of 13 black students attended white high schools in AISD at that time.

== Rivals ==
Travis' biggest rivalry is with fellow AISD school McCallum. The two schools meet annually in many different sports, the largest being an annual football game known as the "Battle of the Bell", in which the winning school is given possession of a 50-pound locomotive bell that has been fought over for decades. During the game, "The Bell" will spend the first half on the defending school's side; at half time it will travel to the opponent's side (usually carried by the cheerleaders, student council, or journalism departments of both schools) where it will sit until the outcome of the game. "The Bell" is usually rung by the winning team in the middle of the field after victory, and at the winning team's school until midnight, at which time it will be stored until the next year's game. The winning school also engraves the date and score of the year's game on the bell, keeping track of the history of the rivalry. Most years, the outcome of this game highly affects which team is named District 26-4A Champions.

In 2010, the Rebels defeated the McCallum Knights for the first time in over a decade. "The Bell" was awarded to Travis, who defended it for the first time in 11 years at the 2011 game.

Another Travis rival is the AISD school David Crockett High School, a game in which the winner is tagged "Kings of the South".

== Travis High in popular media ==
Travis High School has been featured in two full-length motion pictures. Its hallways were featured in the 2004 football drama Friday Night Lights. Also, the THS Band annually participates in the filming of the NBC TV series based on the movie, participating as extras and featured as the visiting team band at football games. The school was also the main setting in the 2006 comedy-mockumentary Chalk It has also been featured in several documentaries.

Travis High School was featured on Wyatt Cenac's Problem Areas 19: Immigration Problems. Travis' Ethnic Studies class and teacher, Andrew Gonzales, were interviewed regarding immigration and Texas public schools.

== NJROTC: 2000–2019 ==
The Travis NJROTC Unit was established in 2001 by agreement between Austin ISD and the United States Navy. One of the main tenets of the program was towards developing excellent citizens/leaders of our great Nation. Over the course of the last 18 years, the NJROTC has represented William B. Travis High school in many local and State Drill meets and supported countless community service events to the Austin area. Academic year 2018/2019 marked the final year of the program due to extremely low enrollment. The School and District declined the Navy's offer to transition to the smaller version of the program known as a Navy National Defense Cadet Corps.

== Notable alumni ==
Psychedelic-rock cult legend Roky Erickson attended Travis High School beginning in 1962, but dropped out in 1965, one month before graduating, rather than cut his hair to conform to the school dress code.

Country music singer-songwriter Rusty Wier, a South Austin legend and a symbol of Austin's "Cosmic Cowboy" scene of the 1970s who was best known for his hit "Don't It Make You Wanna Dance," attended Travis High. Wier, who was part of Austin's "Cosmic Cowboy scene in the 1970s, is a member of the Austin Music Awards Hall of Fame.

Former Major League Baseball player Ken Boswell, a member of the New York Mets' World Series championship team in 1969, played baseball at Travis and was in the Class of 1964.
