= Small Middle School =

Small Middle School may refer to:

- Clint Small, Jr. Middle School in Austin, Texas, United States
- Raymond Jordan-Small Middle School in Windham, Maine, United States
- Robert Smalls Middle School in Beaufort, South Carolina, United States
