= Richards Middle School =

Richards Middle School may refer to:

- Howard C. Richards Middle School - Fraser, Michigan (Detroit area) - Fraser Public Schools
- Richards Middle School - Columbus, Georgia - Muscogee County School District
- Richards Middle School - Gwinnett County, Georgia (Lawrenceville address, Atlanta area) - Gwinnett County Public Schools

== See also ==
- Ann Richards School for Young Women Leaders - This school, in Austin, Texas, has a middle school component.
