= Gonzalo Garza Independence High School =

Garza Independence High School

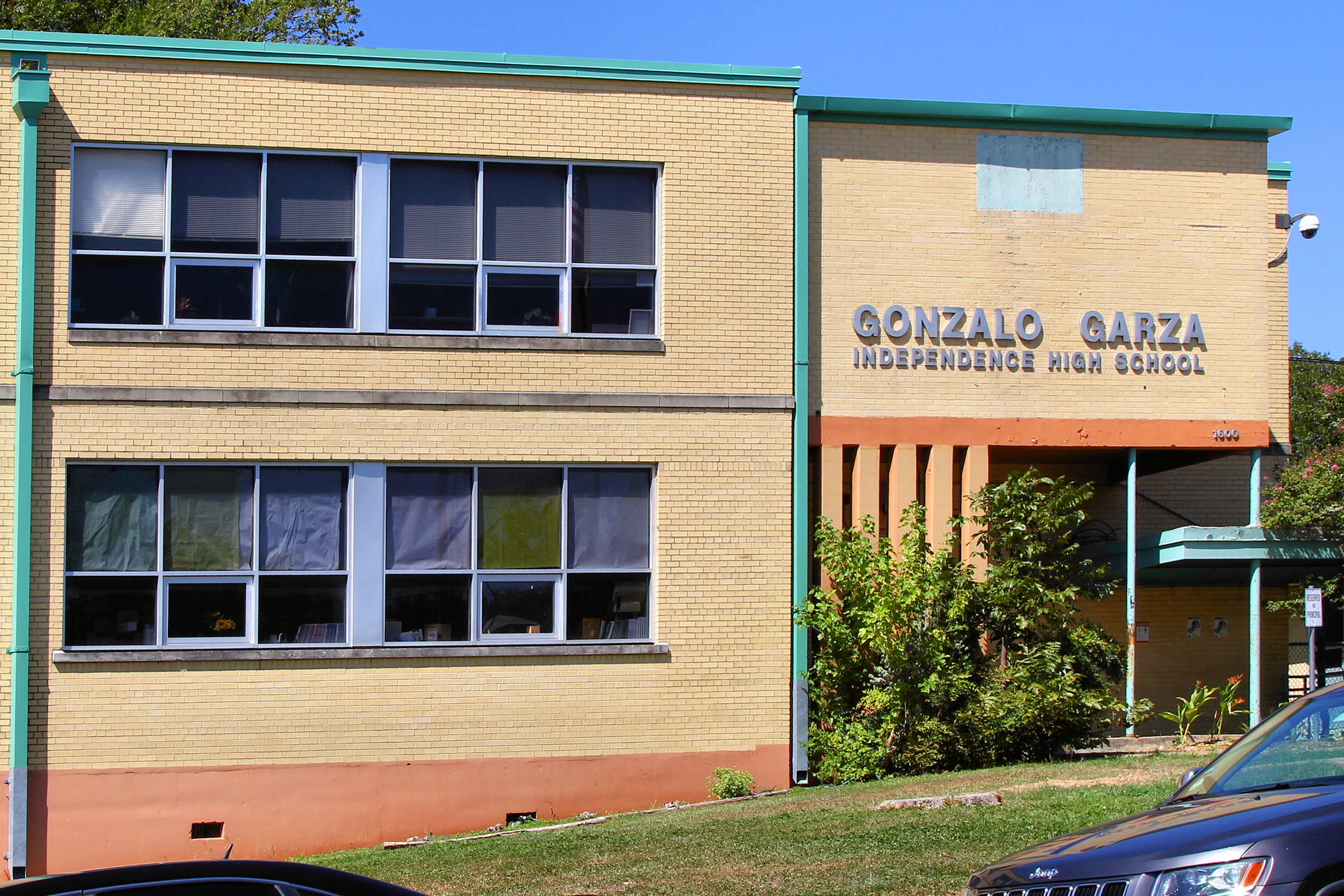

Location
- 1600 Chicon Street; Austin, Texas 78702; United States; 30.277522°N 97.721025°W

Information
- Type: Public school
- Established: 1998
- School district: Austin Independent School District
- NCES District ID: 4808940
- Educational authority: Texas Education Agency
- Superintendent: Matias Segura
- Area trustee: Candace Hunter
- CEEB code: 440339
- NCES School ID: 480894008060
- Principal: Drew Nichols
- Faculty: 22
- Teaching staff: 23.48 (on an FTE basis)
- Grades: 10-12
- Gender: Coeducational
- Enrollment: 199 (2024-2025)
  - Grade 10: 8
  - Grade 11: 94
  - Grade 12: 97
- Student to teacher ratio: 8.48
- Team name: Griffins

Gonzalo Garza Independence High School is an alternative high school in the Austin Independent School District and is located at 1600 Chicon Street in Austin, Texas. It opened in January 1998 under then-principal Victoria Baldwin and is open to any student entering their third year of high school with 10 or more credits. Garza offers a non-traditional, self-paced approach and enrolls about 300 students. In the 2005–2006 school year, Garza had 194 graduates.

During the summer students from AISD can take classes at the school online to gain credits.

Garza has received numerous awards and recognitions, including the Austin Chronicle award for Best Public School Model.
