= Manchaca, Texas =

Manchaca
- Census-designated place
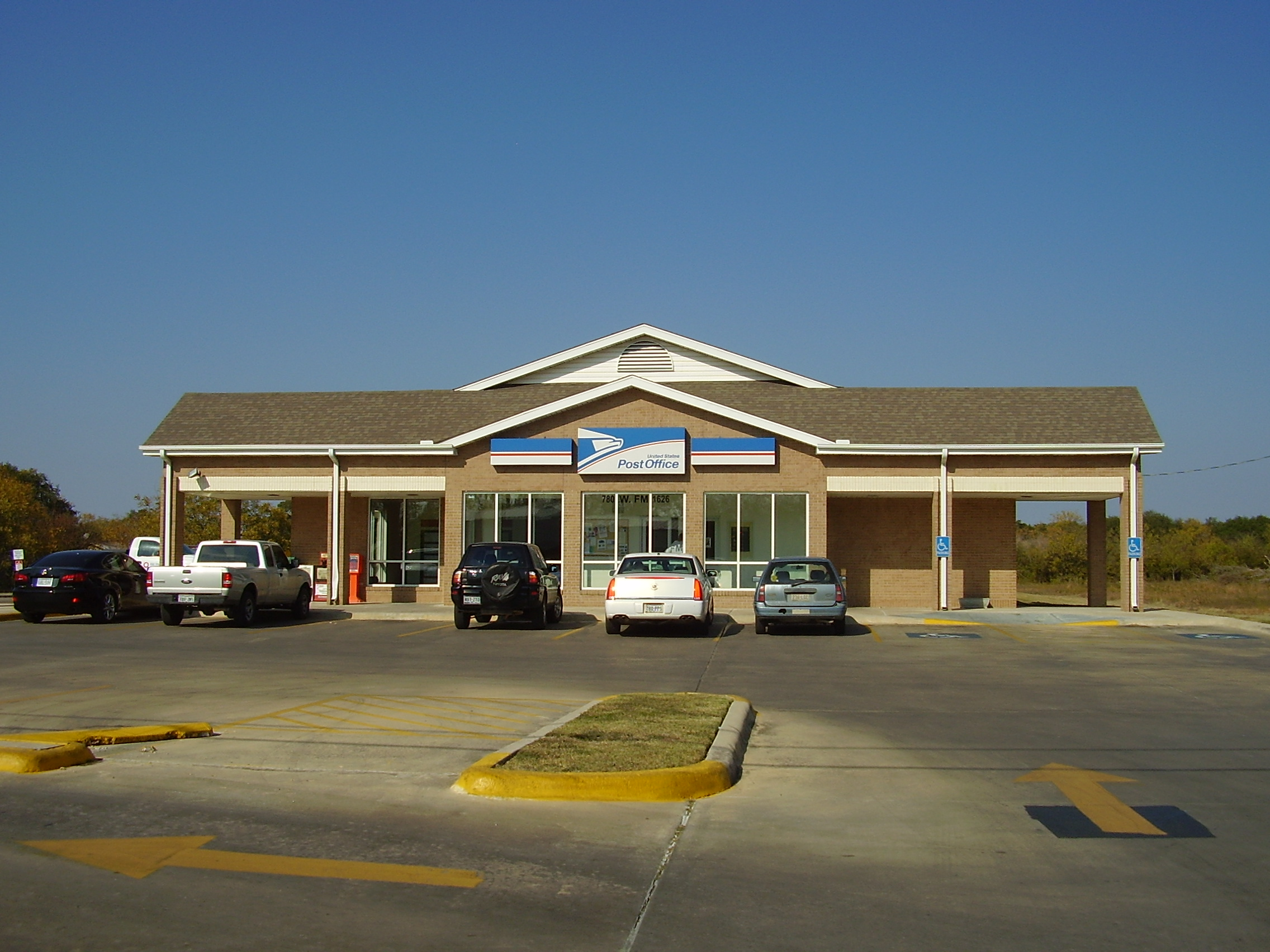
- Manchaca Post Office

- Location within the state of Texas Manchaca (the United States)
- Coordinates: 30°07′48″N 97°50′25″W
- Country: United States
- State: Texas
- County: Travis

Area
  - Total: 1.9 sq mi (4.9 km^{2})
  - Land: 1.9 sq mi (4.9 km^{2})
  - Water: 0 sq mi (0.0 km^{2})
- Elevation: 679 ft (207 m)

Population (2020)
  - Total: 2,266
  - Density: 1,200/sq mi (460/km^{2})
- Time zone: UTC-6 (Central (CST))
  - Summer (DST): UTC-5 (CDT)
- ZIP codes: 78652
- GNIS feature ID: 2629100

Manchaca (/ˈmænʃæk/ MAN-shak) is a census-designated place (CDP) in Travis County, Texas, United States. It is located 12 miles (19 km) southwest of downtown Austin. This was a new CDP for the 2020 census with a population of 2,266.

== History ==
Early development around Manchaca probably stemmed from the springs in the area. Manchaca Springs are a stopping place along a portion of the Old San Antonio Road and later the Chisholm Trail.

Over time there has been much conjecture as to the origin of the name "Manchaca". One school holds that "Manchaca" is derived from the Choctaw word imashaka, meaning "behind it" or "to the rear." There are two areas in Louisiana that carry that name: Manchac Pass and Bayou Manchac. However, another theory holds that Manchaca Springs was named for Tejano army officer José Antonio Menchaca. The current pronunciation of the name 'Manchaca' stems from simple Anglicization.

The springs are referred to as "Manshack Springs" in a collection of memoirs written by an early Anglo settler describing life in 1840s Texas, Recollections of Early Texas: Memoirs of John Holland Jenkins. Thomas Falconer, an English explorer who passed through the area in 1841 referred to the springs as "Manjack's Springs" in his manuscripts. Early maps and newspaper articles indicate the spelling was "Manchac Springs," orthography corroborated by maps produced by noted Tejano land agent Jacob de Cordova in 1849 currently housed at the Texas General Land Office in Downtown Austin.

An early owner of Manchaca Springs was Washington D. Miller, a South Carolina native who went on to serve as a Republic of Texas congressman, private secretary to Sam Houston and after Texas joined the Union, Secretary of State of Texas. The first post office to serve the area was the Manchac House post office that opened two miles south of the present-day location of Manchaca in 1851. The office closed the following year. Also in 1852, Miller negotiated the sale of the springs to Virginia native Adolphus Weir who ran a stagecoach stop on the property. Descendants of the Weir family retained land in the area until well into the 20th century.

A second post office, located at the present-day site of Manchaca, operated from June 1874 to May 1875. Afterwards area residents received mail in the unincorporated community of Onion Creek. The area began to grow when the International-Great Northern Railroad opened in 1880; a third post office, called Manchaca, opened. By 1884 the 75-resident community was a shipping point for cotton, grain, lumber, and posts. In the 1890s a Methodist church, hotel, and a school had opened. The common school district serving Manchaca, had three grade schools noted on a 1932 Travis County Engineering Department map housed at the Perry–Castañeda Library at the University of Texas; one for White students located on what is today the northeast corner of FM 1626 and Manchaca Road, one grade school for African American students located at what is today 753 FM 1626, and one grade school for Mexican American students located just off Polk Road near the railroad tracks. These schools became the focus of the community. The district joined forces with the Oak Hill district to form a new high school district in 1961. AISD annexed the entire high school district in 1967.

By January 1903, Manchaca's population reached 100 and was home to four businesses: The Blackwell General Store, A. G. Matthews as Blacksmith, R. E. Summerrow General Store, and the Summerrow & Carpenter Cotton Gin. The community had 200 people by the 1960s. In the 1970s the number of residents decreased to 36. Local development increased by the mid-1980s, and accelerated through the early 2000s.

== Geography ==
Manchaca has a total area of 1.9 square miles (4.9 km^{2}), all land.

=== Climate ===
The climate in this area is characterized by hot, humid summers and generally mild to cool winters. According to the Köppen Climate Classification system, Manchaca has a humid subtropical climate, abbreviated "Cfa" on climate maps.

== Demographics ==
Historical population
Census	Pop.	Note	%±
2010	1,133		—
2020	2,266		100.0%
U.S. Decennial Census; 1850–1900 1910; 1920 1930 1940; 1950 1960 1970; 1980 1990 2000; 2010 2020

Manchaca first appeared as a census designated place in the 2010 U.S. census.

=== 2020 census ===
Manchaca CDP, Texas – Racial and ethnic composition Note: the US Census treats Hispanic/Latino as an ethnic category. This table excludes Latinos from the racial categories and assigns them to a separate category. Hispanics/Latinos may be of any race.
Race / Ethnicity (NH = Non-Hispanic)	Pop 2010	Pop 2020	% 2010	% 2020
White alone (NH)	716	1,198	63.20%	52.87%
Black or African American alone (NH)	17	41	1.50%	1.81%
Native American or Alaska Native alone (NH)	11	4	0.97%	0.18%
Asian alone (NH)	9	63	0.79%	2.78%
Native Hawaiian or Pacific Islander alone (NH)	6	5	0.53%	0.22%
Other race alone (NH)	0	19	0.00%	0.84%
Mixed race or Multiracial (NH)	10	93	0.88%	4.10%
Hispanic or Latino (any race)	364	843	32.13%	37.20%
Total	1,133	2,266	100.00%	100.00%

== Education ==
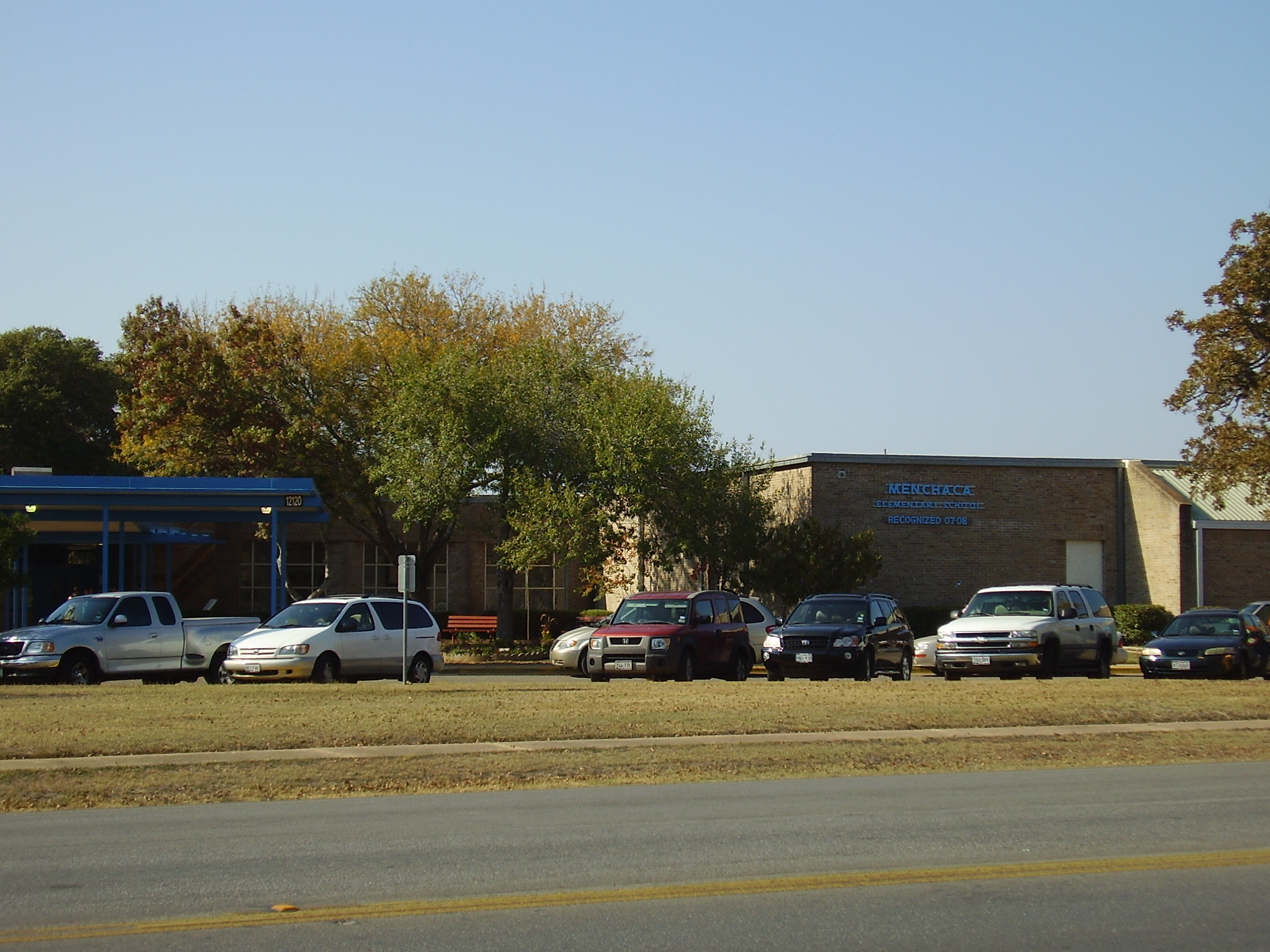
Manchaca Elementary School

Manchaca is within the Austin Independent School District. Residents are zoned to Menchaca Elementary School in the Manchaca community, Paredes Middle School in Austin, and Akins High School in Austin.

Menchaca Elementary School was built in 1977 at the intersection of Manchaca Road and FM 1626. In 2020 the existing school was demolished and the school was replaced by its newest iteration, located further west on the same property. Paredes Middle School opened in January 2000. Akins High School opened in August 2000.

== Transportation ==
The main roads through Manchaca are:

- Texas Farm-to-Market Road 1626, running generally west–east; and
- Texas Farm-to-Market Road 2304, also known as Manchaca Road on the south end where it connects to the community of Manchaca, and Menchaca Road from Frate Barker Road to South Lamar Blvd within Austin city limits. In 2019 the northern portion of road within Austin city limits was changed from Manchaca Road to Menchaca Road, in honor of Texas Revolution army officer Jose Antonio Menchaca, whom advocates theorize the community was named after. The community's name Manchaca remains unchanged; and
- Twin Creeks Road, running south from FM 1626 from just east of a railroad crossing; and
- Old San Antonio Road, running south from Austin to Buda just west of Interstate 35.

FM 2304/Menchaca Road realigns along Austin's north-northeast—south-southwest axis as it goes into the city limits after crossing Frate Barker Road. FM 1626 connects to Interstate 35 two miles to the east, while it runs west until it reaches Bear Creek, which it winds along and crosses, then heads generally southward until it passes Buda, where it generally curves back eastward until it reaches Interstate 35 once more, just north of Kyle. Twin Creeks Road crosses Bear and Onion Creeks near their confluence, just east of the road from which its name is derived, then curves to run east until it ends at Old San Antonio Road, a branch of the old Camino Real, which runs from Austin west of Interstate 35 and passes Manchaca Springs, an historic spot after which the community is named, just north of the Hays County line and Buda.

== Government ==
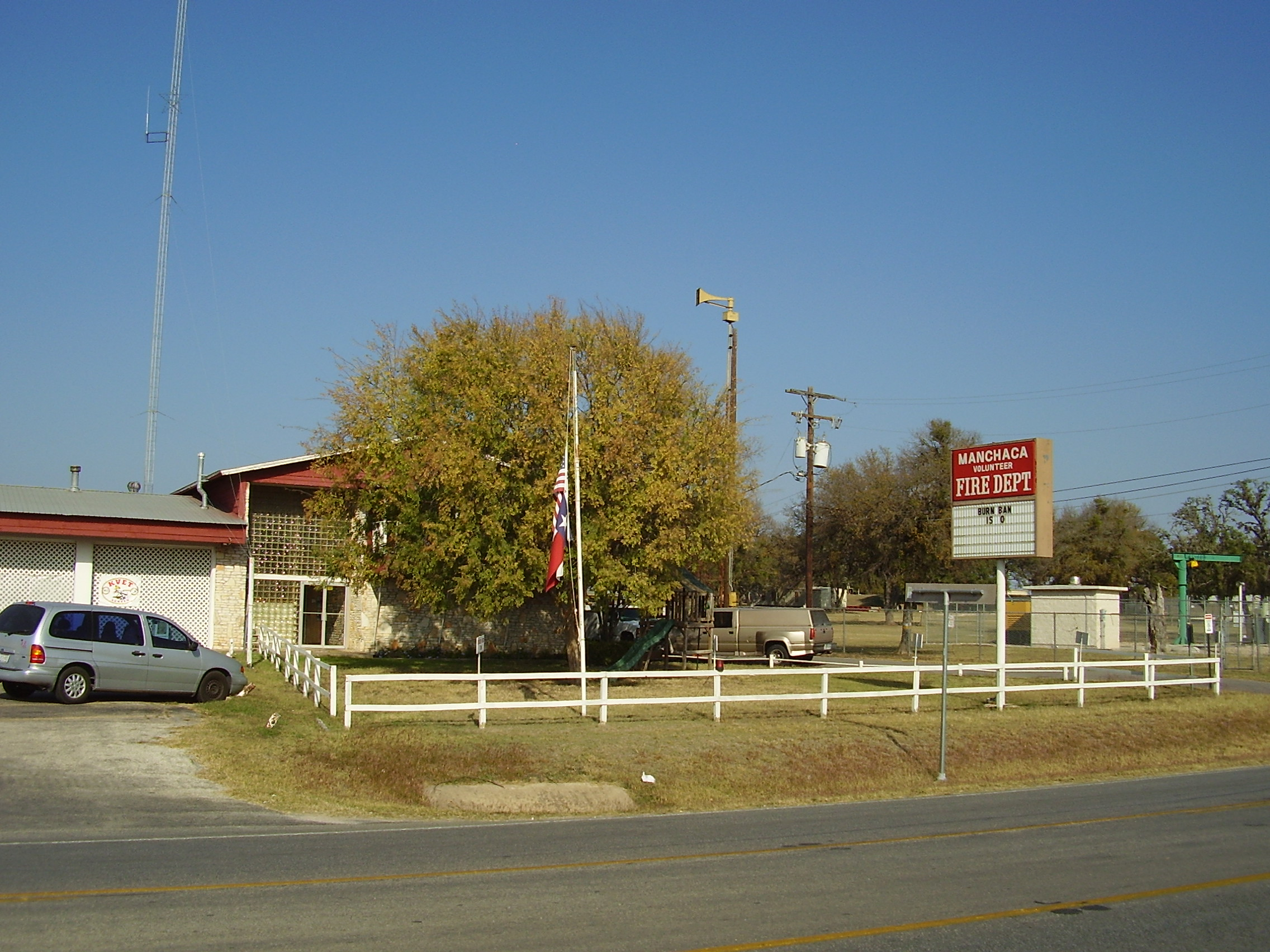
Manchaca Volunteer Fire Department

Travis County Emergency Services District 5 provides Manchaca and the surrounding area with fire protection and medical first response out of 1 station. Austin/ Travis County EMS provides the community with ambulance services. The Travis County Sheriff's Office provides police protection. The community is within Travis County Precinct 3.

Manchaca is located in District 47 of the Texas House of Representatives. As of 2011 Paul Workman represents the district. Manchaca is within District 25 of the Texas Senate. As of 2013, Donna Campbell represents the district.

Manchaca is in Texas's 37th congressional district; as of 2025 Lloyd Doggett is the representative. The designated United States Postal Service office is the Manchaca Post Office at 780 West Farm to Market Road 1626 in Manchaca.
