= Crockett High School (Austin, Texas) =

Crockett Early College High School

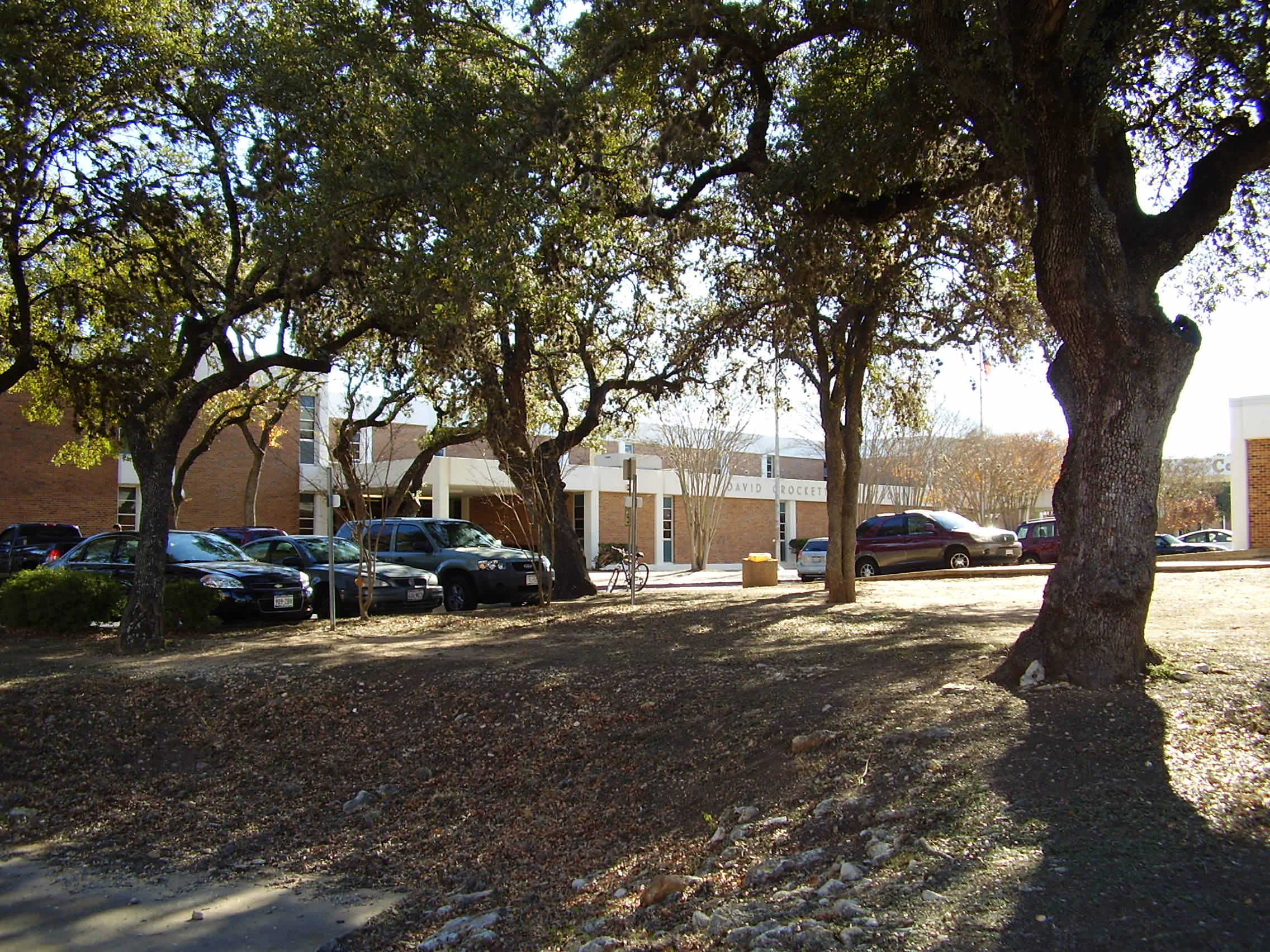

Location
- 5601 Menchaca Rd; Austin, TX 78745

Information
- School type: Public
- Established: 1968
- School district: Austin Independent School District
- Principal: Shana King
- Grades: 9th–12th
- Enrollment: 1,543 (2025-2026)
- Colors: Brown and gold
- Athletics conference: UIL Class 5A D2
- Mascot: Cougar
- Website: https://crockett.austinschools.org/

David Crockett Early College High School is a public high school located in South Austin, Texas. The school opened in 1968 and is part of the Austin Independent School District (AISD). It was named after U.S. frontiersman Davy Crockett.

== History ==
Crockett High School is located at the corner of Menchaca Road and Stassney Lane. Crockett's first principal, Forrest Kline, teachers and students enjoyed lunch in the courtyard amongst massive boulders and oak trees because the cafeteria had not been completed. Actor Fess Parker, best known for his 1950s portrayals of Davy Crockett for Walt Disney, attended the school's first pep rally.

In 1971, a federal judge ordered Anderson High School in East Austin closed because it was still racially segregated. African-American students from the old Anderson High School were bused to Crockett starting in the fall of that year.

== Students ==
As of October 2025, Crockett had an enrollment of 1,543. The student body was 72.2% Hispanic, 18.4% White, 4.8% African American, and 1.2% Asian. 60.4% of Crockett students were economically disadvantaged, and 27.5% were English Language Learners.

== Programs ==
In 1980 and again in 1981 the band won First Place at the UIL State Marching Band Contest (Class 5-A) and was named "Best Band Ever" by Texas Monthly Magazine.

By 2008 the school began providing free cosmetology training through a revamped cosmetology program. Students are able to begin work immediately after high school through this program.

Beginning in the 2015-2016 school year, an Entrepreneurship program funded by the Bazaarvoice Foundation was offered. This program is the first of its kind in the Austin Independent School District, and when grouped with its sister programs in Cunningham Elementary School and Covington Middle School, it is the first K-12 Entrepreneurship Programs in the US.

== Notable alumni ==
- Roger Huerta, professional MMA fighter
- Gabriel Luna, class of 2001, actor & producer.
- Bruce Scholtz, class of 1977, former professional football player
- Karen Tumulty, class of 1973, political columnist for the Washington Post
- Cameron Dickey, class of 2024, college football player
