= Austin Independent School District =

School district in Texas

Address
- 4000 S. I-H 35 Frontage Rd ESC Region 13 Austin, Texas, 78704; United States

District information
- Type: independent
- Grades: Pre-K–12
- Established: 1881; 145 years ago
- Superintendent: Matias Segura
- Accreditation: accredited (2018–19)
- Schools: 125
- Budget: $1.7 B (FY2019)
- NCES District ID: 4808940

Students and staff
- Students: 72,125 (2024-2025)
- Teachers: 5,176.1 (FTE) (2024-2025)
- Student–teacher ratio: 13:9 (2024-2025)
- Athletic conference: District 26 6A, District 24 5A

Other information
- Website: www.austinisd.org

Austin Independent School District is a school district based in the city of Austin, Texas, United States. Established in 1881, the district serves most of the City of Austin, the neighboring municipalities of Sunset Valley and San Leanna, and unincorporated areas in Travis County (including Manchaca). The district operates 116 schools including 78 elementary schools, 19 middle schools, and 17 high schools. As of 2013, AISD covers 54.1% of the City of Austin by area and serves 73.5% of its residents.

== Academic achievement ==
In 2018–19, the school district received a B rating from the Texas Education Agency (TEA). No state accountability ratings were given to districts for the 2019–20 and 2020-21 school years. Prior to the 2011-12 school year, school districts in Texas could receive one of four possible rankings from the Texas Education Agency: Exemplary (the highest possible ranking), Recognized, Academically Acceptable, and Academically Unacceptable (the lowest possible ranking). For the 2012-13 school year, the TEA moved to a Pass/Fail system. In 2018, the TEA implemented the A–F accountability system for school districts.

Historical district TEA accountability ratings
School Year	Rating
2021-22	B
2020-21	Not Rated: Declared State of Disaster
2019-20	Not Rated: Declared State of Disaster
2018-19	B
2017-18	B
2016-17	Met Standard
2015-16	Met Standard
2014-15	Met Standard
2013-14	Met Standard
2012-13	Met Standard
2011-12	Not Rated
2010-11	Academically Acceptable
2009-10	Academically Acceptable
2008-09	Academically Acceptable
2007-08	Academically Acceptable
2006-07	Academically Acceptable
2005-06	Academically Acceptable
2004-05	Academically Acceptable
2003-04	Academically Acceptable

== Finances ==
Like other Texas public school districts, Austin ISD is funded through a combination of local property taxes, general state revenues (such as occupation taxes, Texas Lottery profits, and returns from the Permanent School Fund), and federal education funds. The district also funds some facilities construction and improvements through the issuance of debt by bond elections; Austin ISD's most recent bond elections have been held in 2013, 2017, and 2022.

== Board of Trustees ==
Members are elected in nonpartisan elections and serve four year terms. Positions 1-7 are elected in single-member districts, while positions 8 and 9 are elected at-large.

Place	Name	Term	Elected	Term Up
1	Candace Hunter	1st	2022	2026
2	LaRessa Quintana	1st	2024	2028
3	Kevin Foster	2nd	2020	2028
4	Katherine Whitley Chu	1st	2022	2026
5	Lynn Boswell	2nd	2020	2028
6	Andrew Gonzales	1st	2022	2026
7	David Kauffman	1st	2022	2026
8	Fernando Lucas de Urioste	1st	2024	2028
9	Arati Singh	3rd	2018	2026

== List of superintendents ==
- John B. Winn – 1881–1894
- Prof. Thomas Green Harris – 1895–1903
- Arthur N. McCallum Sr. – 1903–1942
- Dr. Russell Lewis – 1942–1947
- Dr. J.W. Edgar – 1947–1950
- Dr. Irby B. Carruth – 1950–1970
- Dr. Jack L. Davidson – 1970–1980
- Dr. John Ellis – 1980–1990
- Dr. Gonzalo Garza (Interim) – 1990–1991
- Dr. Jim B. Hensley – 1991–1992
- Dr. Terry N. Bishop (Interim) – 1993–1994
- Dr. James Fox Jr. – 1995–1998
- A.C. Gonzalez (Interim) – 1998–1999
- Dr. Pascal D. Forgione Jr. – 1999–2009
- Dr. Meria Carstarphen – 2009–2014
- Dr. Paul Cruz – 2014–2020
- Dr. Stephanie S. Elizalde – 2020–2022
- Dr. Anthony Mays (Interim) – 2022
- Matias Segura – 2023–Present

== Demographics ==
In the 1970s white flight to Westlake and other suburbs of Austin that were majority white began. In 1970 the student body of Austin ISD was 65% non-Hispanic (Anglo) white. In the late 1970s the student body was 57% non-Hispanic white, 26% Hispanic and Latino, and 15% African-American. Until 1978 Austin ISD categorized Hispanics and Latinos as "white" so they could integrate them with African-Americans while leaving non-Hispanic whites out of integration. That year it was forced to integrate Hispanics and non-Hispanic whites. In 2000 the student body of Austin ISD was 37% non-Hispanic white. The Hispanic student population peaked in 2011, at 52,398 students. As of the 2016-17 school year, there are 48,386 Hispanic students, 22,761 non-Hispanic white students, and 6,578 African-American students.

On November 18, 2019 the Austin ISD board of Trustees voted 6-3 in favor of a plan closing four elementary schools. This vote was criticized by many, including Austin ISD Chief Equity Officer, Dr. Hawley who stated that the "map that you have of the closures is a map of what 21st century racism looks like. ... Our process for selecting schools was flawed. It was inequitable." The six Trustees who voted to close the schools were Cindy Anderson, Amber Elenz, Geronimo Rodriguez, Jayme Mathias, Yasmin Wagner and Kristen Ashy.

Demographics	2024-25	2020-21	2015-16	2010-11	2005-06
African-American	6%	6.6%	7.8%	9.5%	13.5%
Asian	4.8%	4.5%	3.8%	3.3%	2.9%
Hispanic	54.4%	55.0%	58.8%	60.3%	55.4%
Native American	0.2%	0.1%	0.2%	0.3%	0.2%
Pacific Islander	0.1%	0.1%	0.1%	0.1%	—
Two or more races	4.1%	3.8%	2.7%	2.2%	—
White, non-Hispanic	30.4%	30.1%	26.6%	24.3%	27.9%

== High schools ==
Chronological founding of zoned high school campuses
1881	Austin High School
1953	McCallum High School
1953	Travis Early College High School
1961	Navarro Early College High School
1965	Northeast Early College High School
1968	Crockett Early College High School
1973	Anderson High School
1974	LBJ Early College High School
1988	Bowie High School
2000	Akins Early College High School
2008	Eastside Early College High School

Images of AISD High Schools

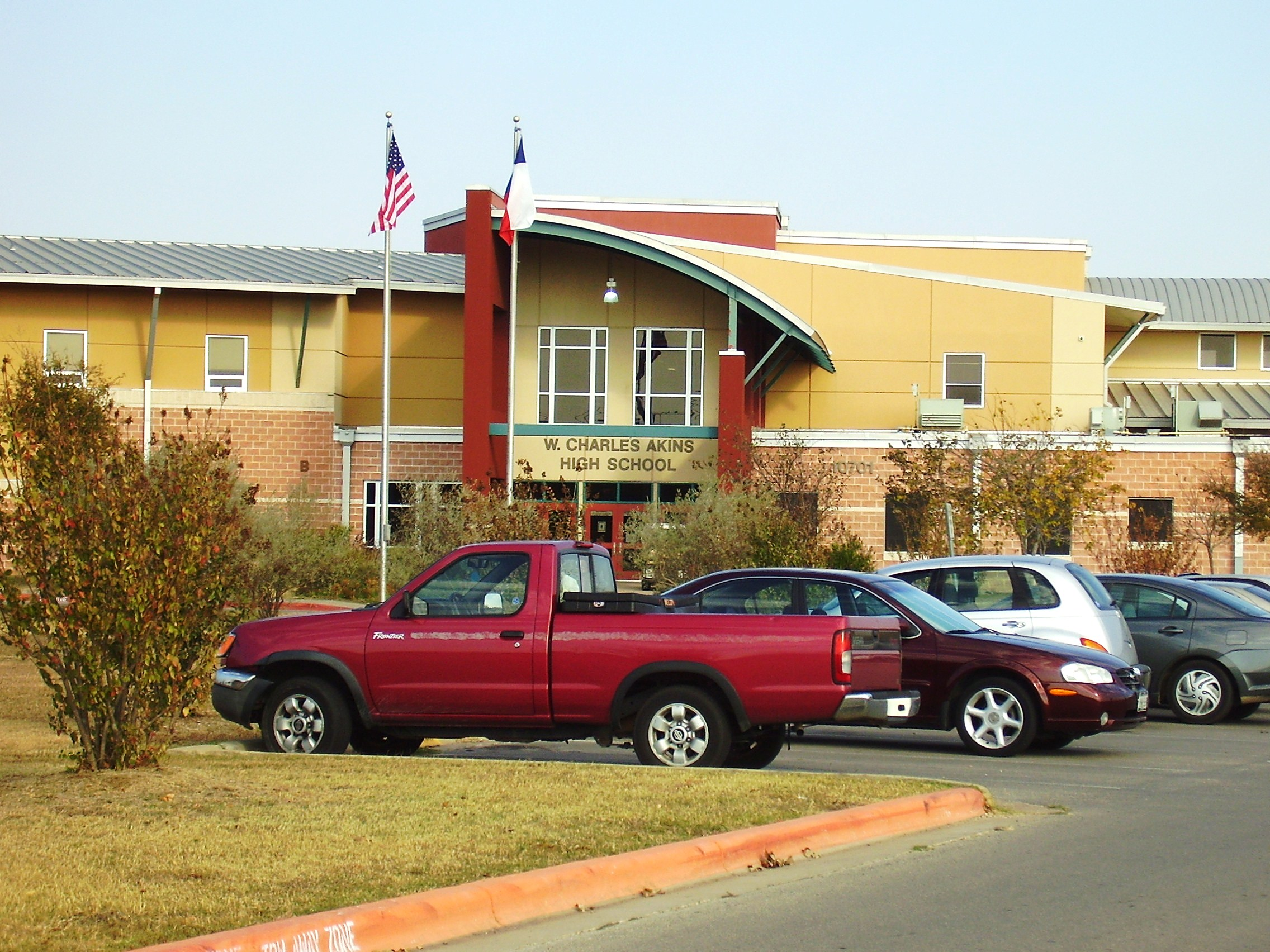
Akins Early College High School

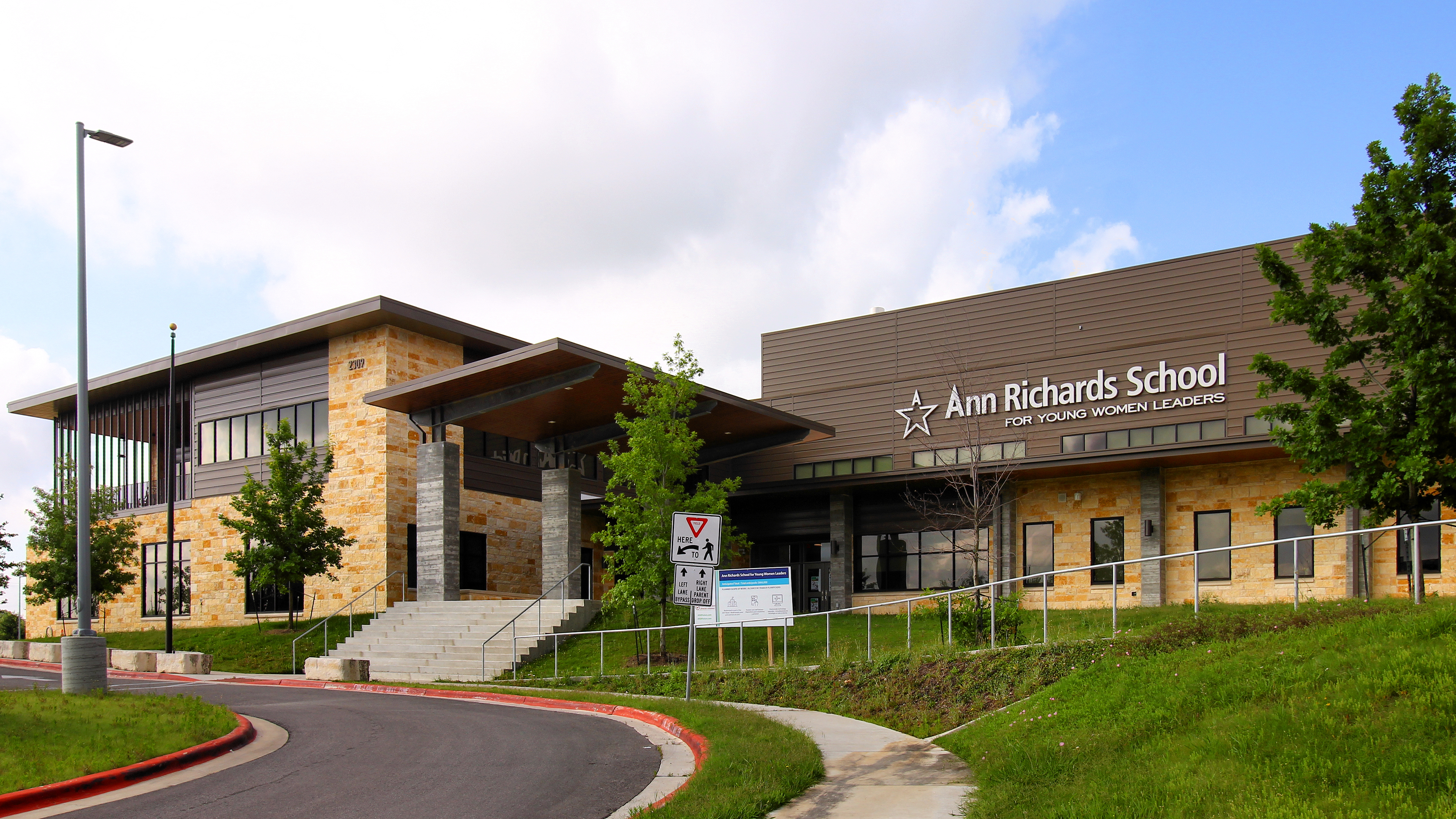
Ann Richards School for Young Women Leaders

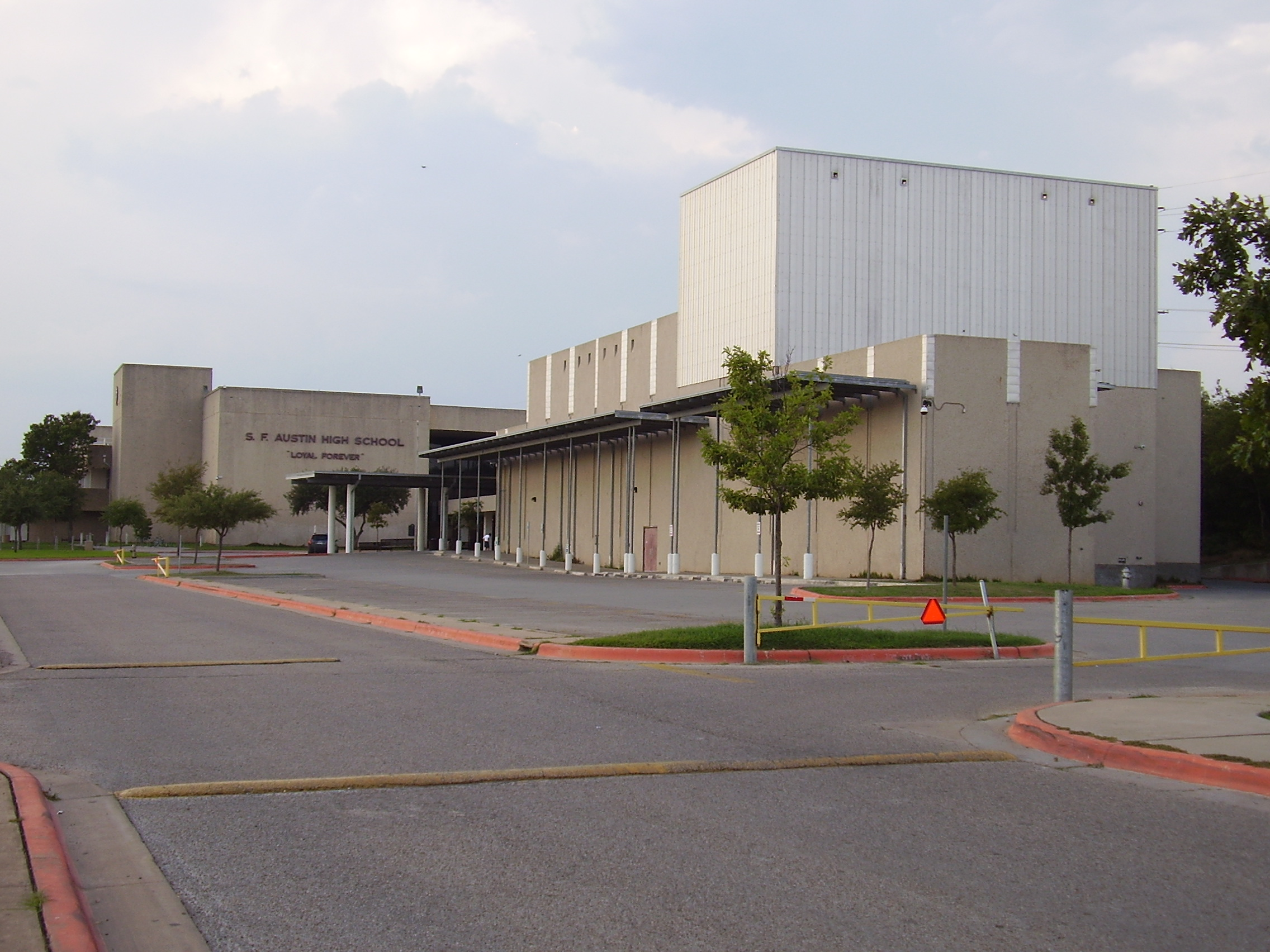
Austin High School

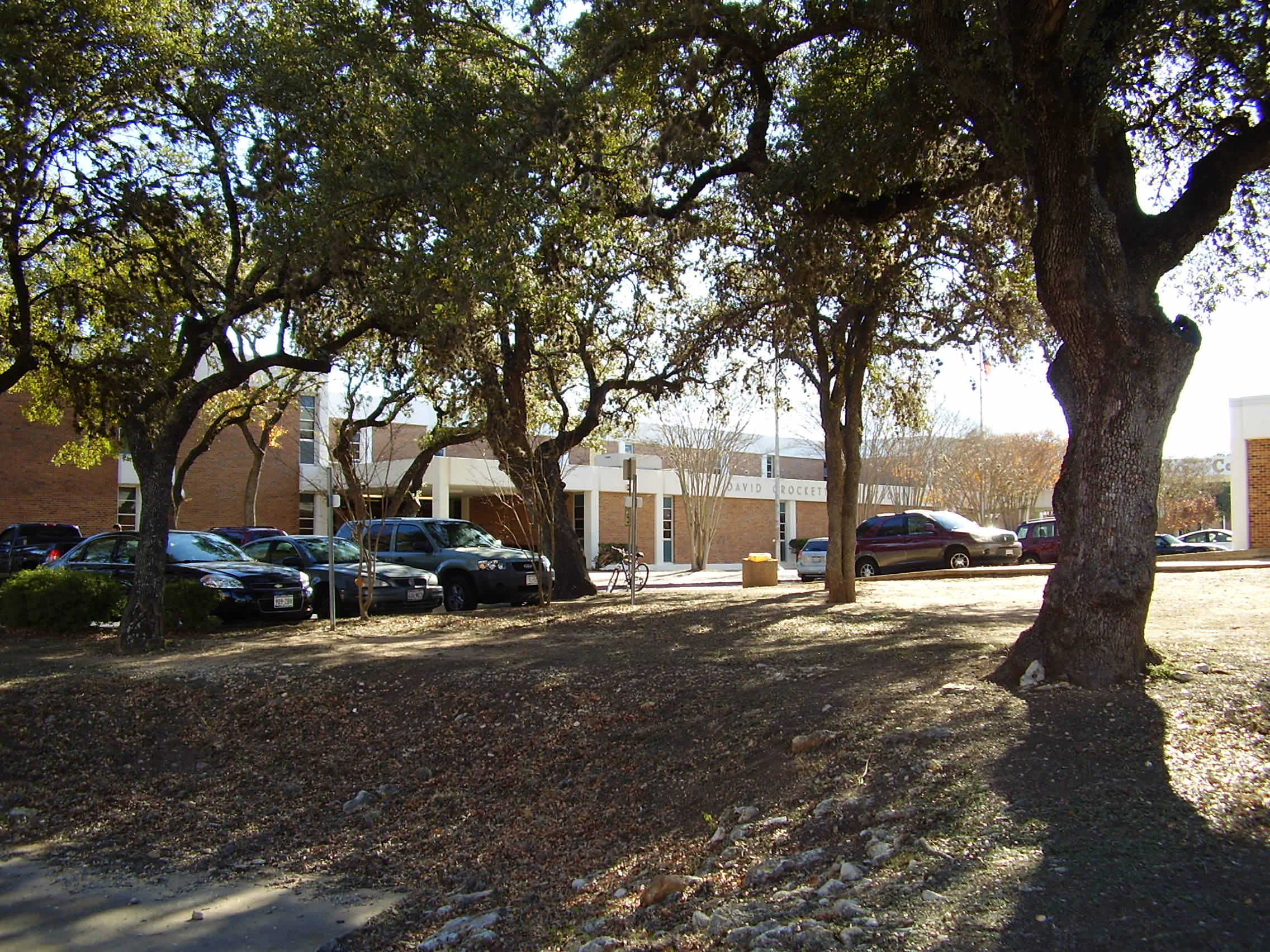
Crockett Early College High School

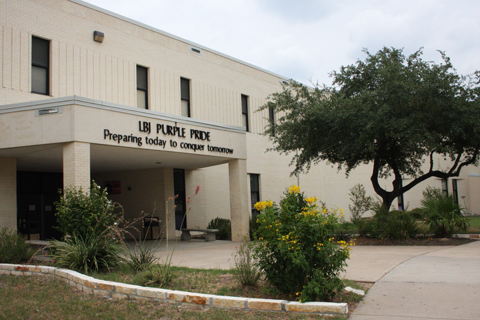
LBJ Early College High School

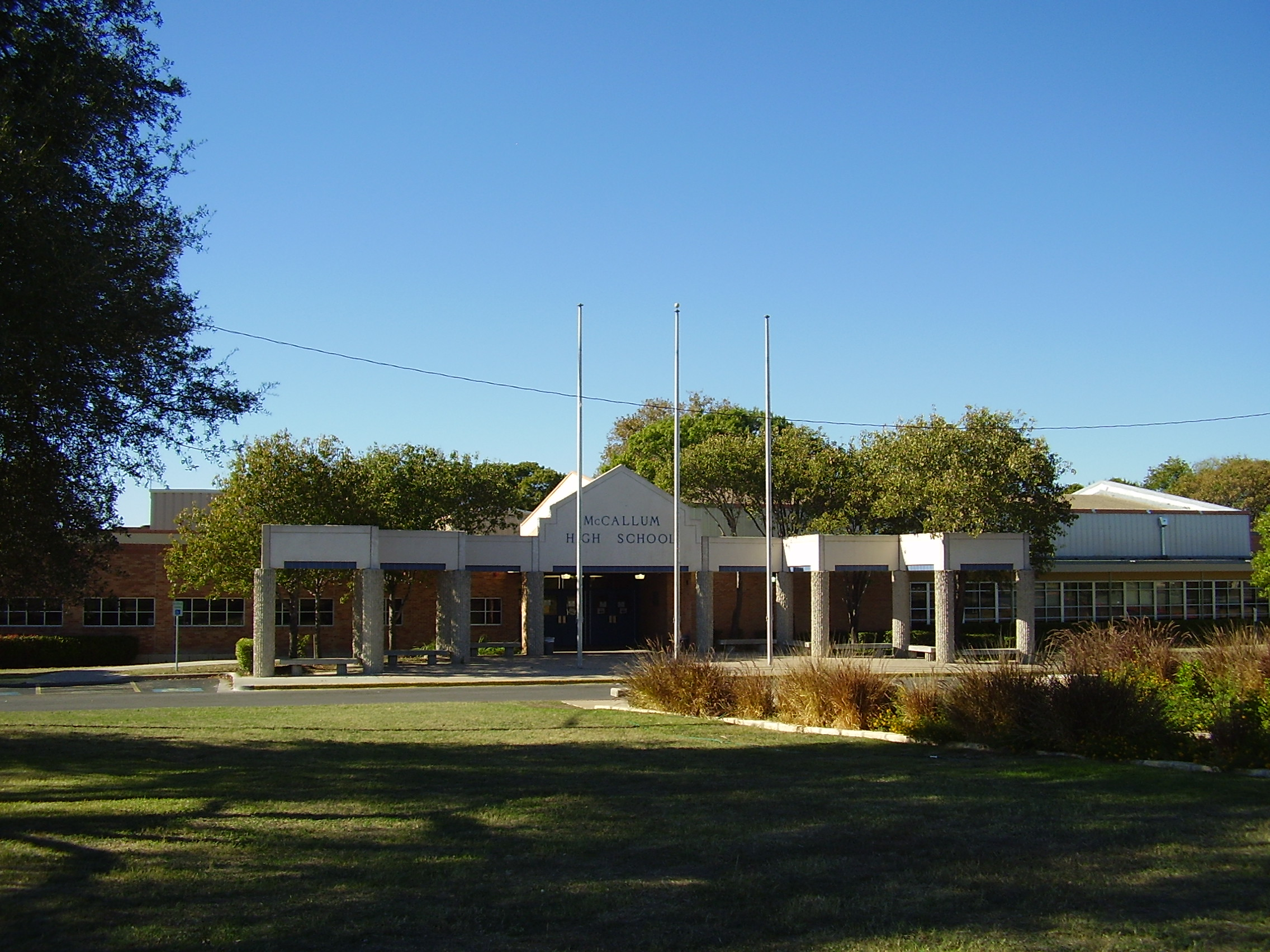
McCallum High School

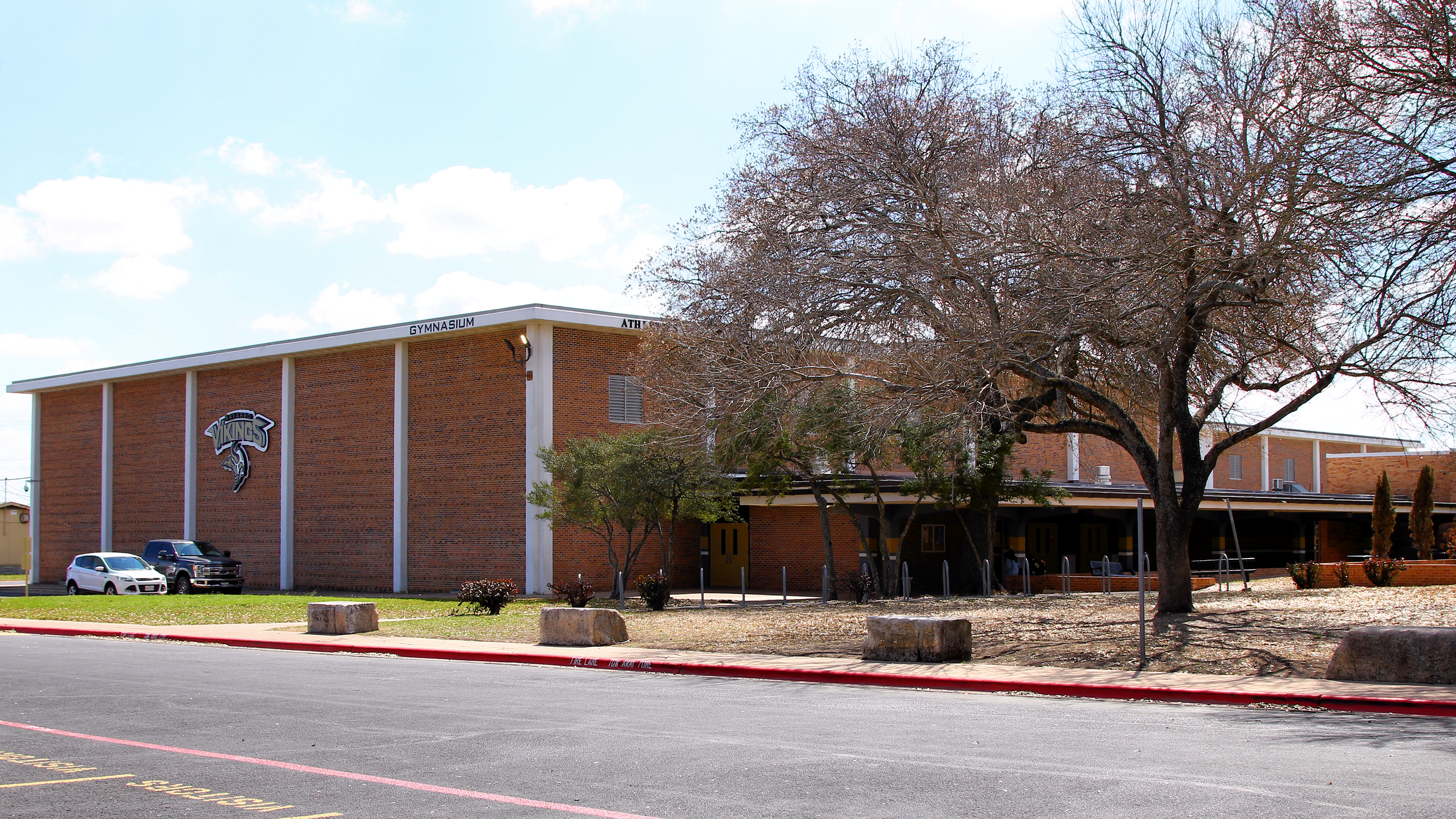
Navarro Early College High School

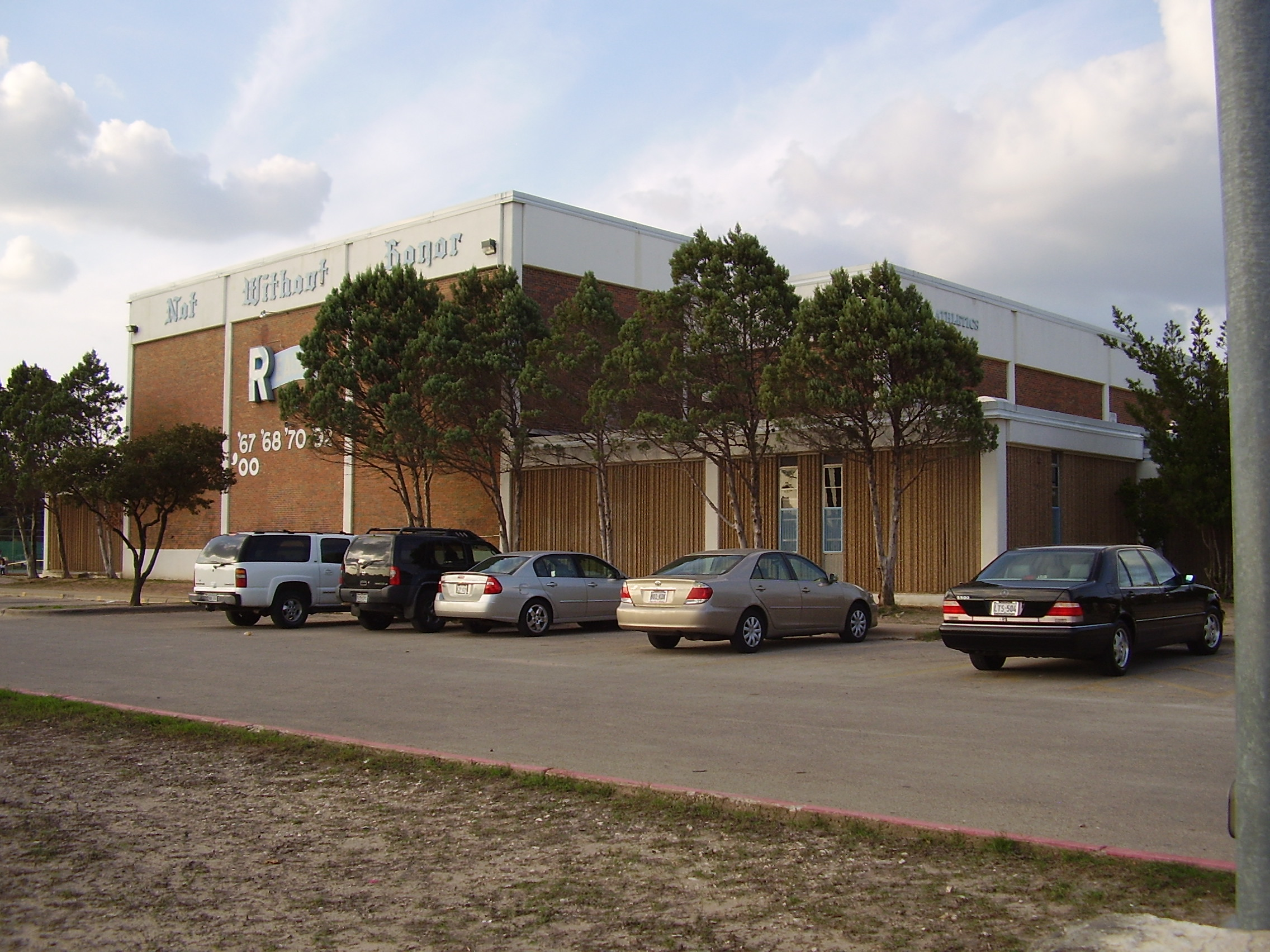
Northeast Early College High School

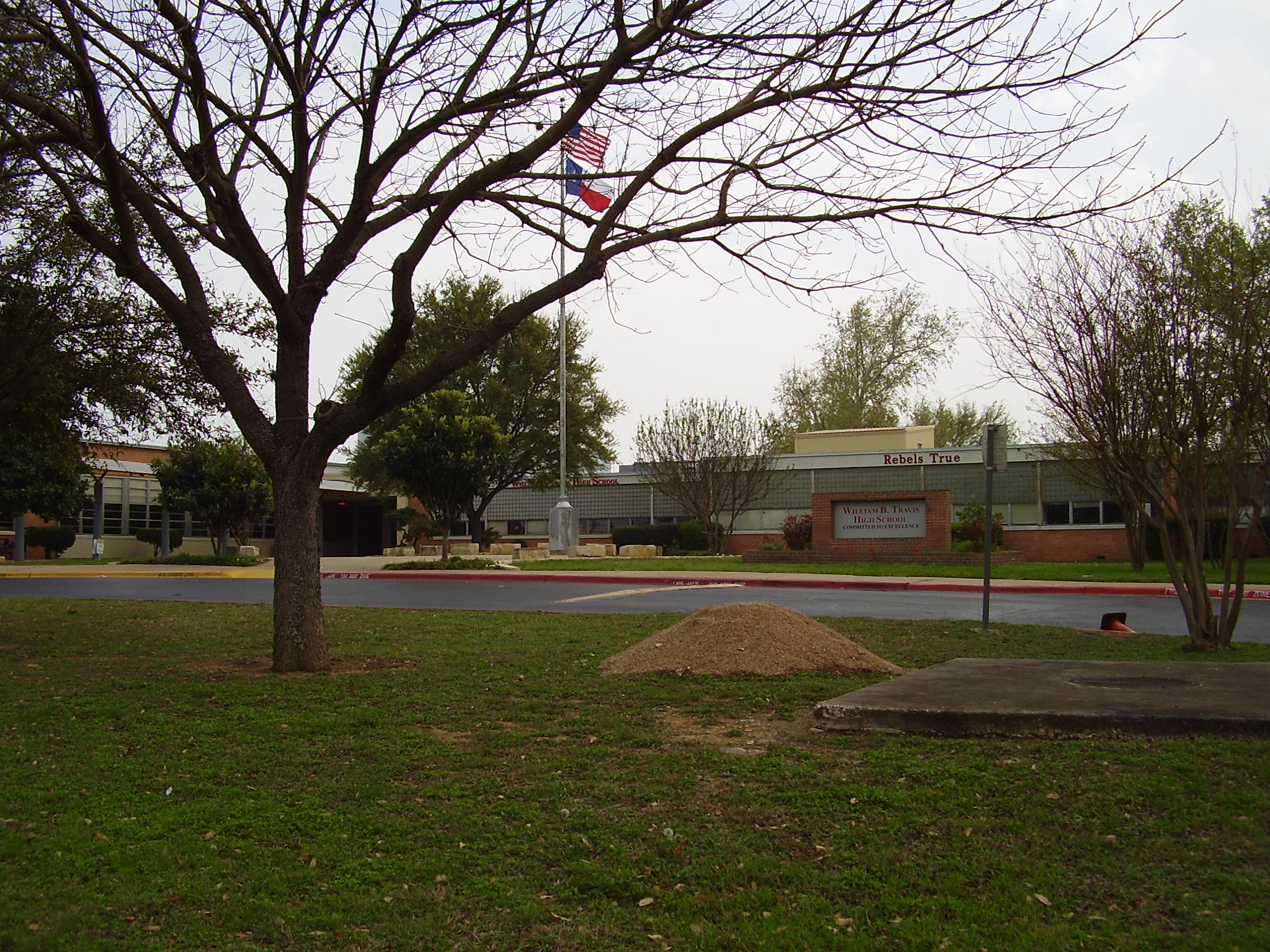
Travis Early College High School

The following high schools cover grades 9 to 12, unless otherwise noted.

=== Zoned high schools ===
High School	Established	Enrollment (2025–26)	Namesake	Mascot
Akins Early College High School	2000	2,354	William Charles Akins	Eagles
Anderson High School	1973	2,173	Laurine Cecil Anderson	Trojans
Austin High School	1881	2,292	Stephen Fuller Austin	Maroons
Bowie High School	1988	2,869	James Bowie	Bulldogs
Crockett Early College High School	1968	1,463	Davy Crockett	Cougars
Eastside Early College High School (2021–present) Eastside Memorial Early College High School (2008-2021)	2008	584	East Austin	Panthers
LBJ Early College High School	1974	728	Lyndon Baines Johnson	Jaguars
McCallum High School	1953	1,952	Arthur Newell McCallum	Knights
Navarro Early College High School (2019–present) Lanier Early College High School (1961-2019)	1961	1,391	Juan Pantoja Navarro (2019–present) Sidney Clopton Lanier (1961-2019)	Vikings
Northeast Early College High School (2019–present) Reagan Early College High School (1965-2019)	1965	952	Northeast Austin (2019–present) John Henninger Reagan (1965-2019)	Raiders
Travis Early College High School	1953	917	William Barret Travis	Rebels

=== Unzoned high schools ===
The Ann Richards School, Garza Independence High School, and LASA have independent campuses, but International High School shares a campus with Northeast Early College High School.

High School	Established	Grades	Enrollment (2025–26)	Namesake	Mascot
Ann Richards School for Young Women Leaders	2007	6-12	921	Dorothy Ann Richards	Stars
Garza Independence High School	1998	10-12	132	Gonzalo Garza	Griffins
International High School	2003-2026	9-10	213	—	—
Liberal Arts & Science Academy (LASA)	2007	9-12	1,592	—	Raptors

=== Other high school programs ===
The Graduation Preparatory Academies at Navarro and Travis Early College High Schools are officially listed as separate schools from their home campuses, but they are housed within the same building and share many programs.

Host Campus	Other programs
McCallum High School	McCallum Fine Arts Academy
Navarro Early College High School	Graduation Preparatory Academy at Navarro ECHS
Travis Early College High School	Graduation Preparatory Academy Travis Institute of Hospitality & Culinary Arts

== Middle schools ==
Chronological founding of zoned middle school campuses (1886-1999)
1886	Lively Middle School
1930	Kealing Middle School
1953	O. Henry Middle School
1955	Lamar Middle School
1958	Bertha Sadler Means Young Women's Leadership Academy
1961-2026?..	Burnet Middle School
1966-2026	Martin Middle School
1967	Murchison Middle School
1968-2026?..	Webb Middle School
1972-2026	Bedichek Middle School
1973	Dobie Middle School
1986	Covington Middle School
1987	Mendez Middle School
1993	Bailey Middle School
1999	Small Middle School

Chronological founding of zoned middle school campuses (2000-present)
2000-2026	Paredes Middle School
2007	Gus Garcia Young Men's Leadership Academy
2009	Gorzycki Middle School
2023	Marshall Middle School

Images of AISD Middle Schools

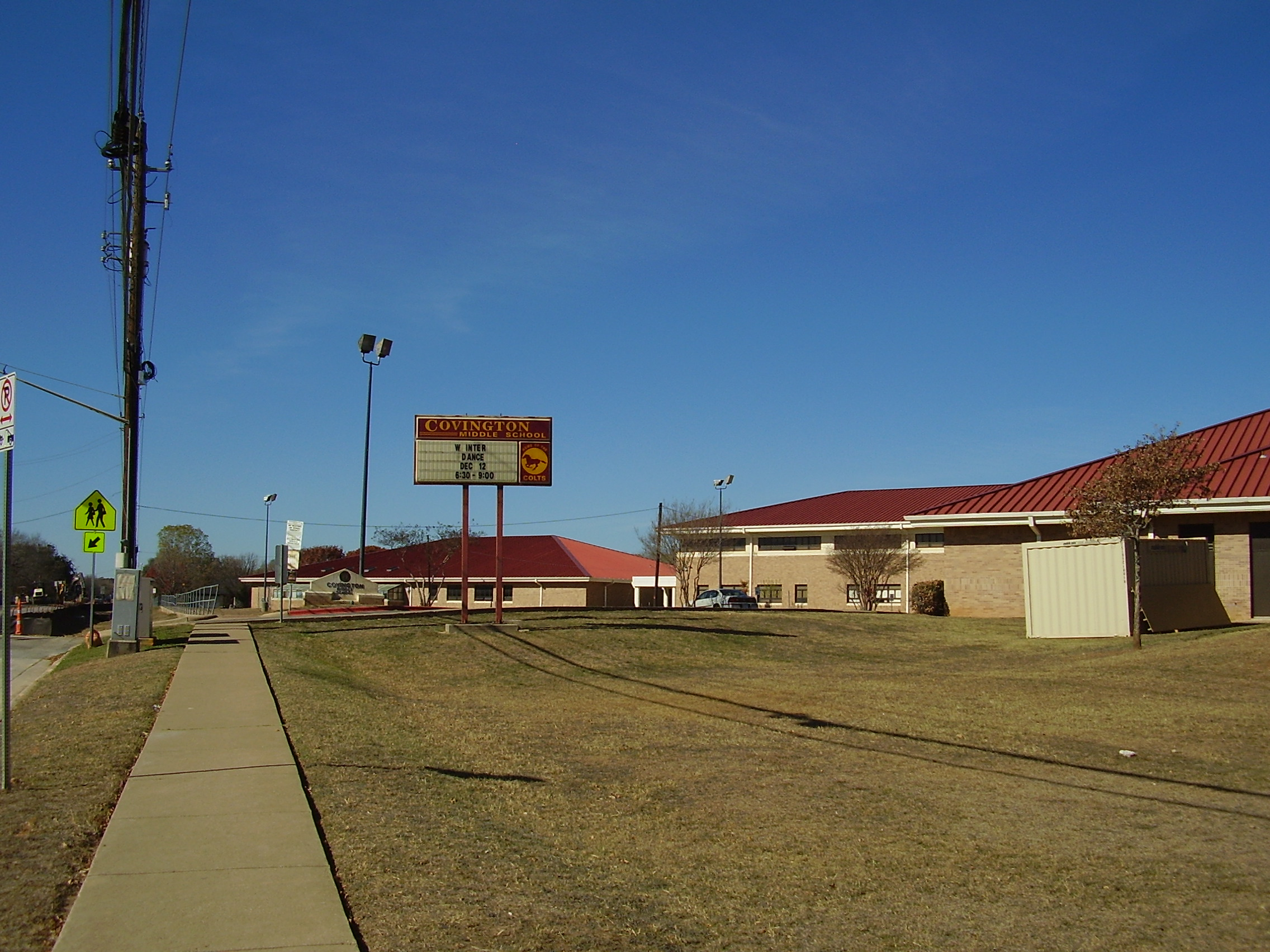
Covington Middle School

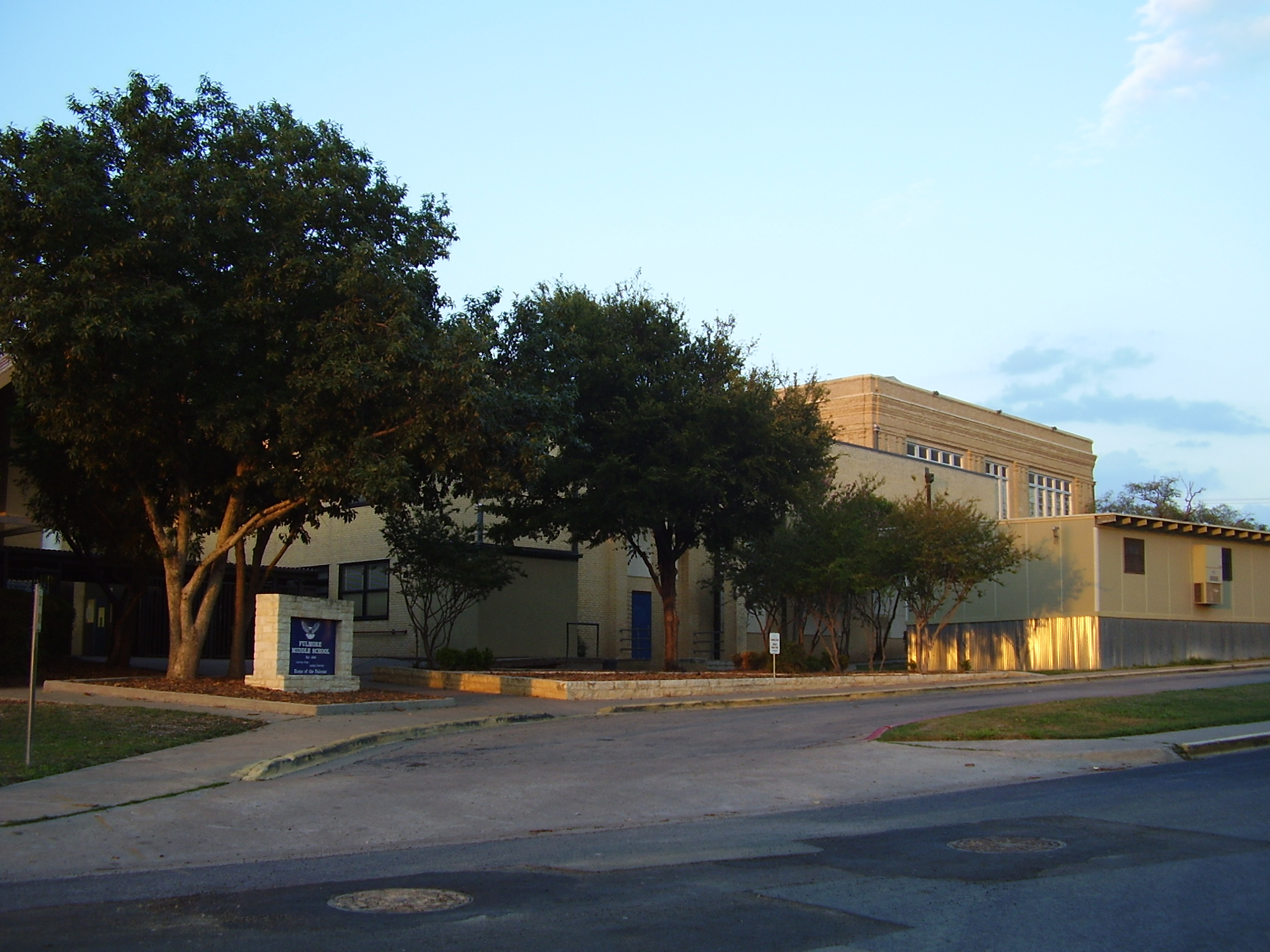
Lively Middle School

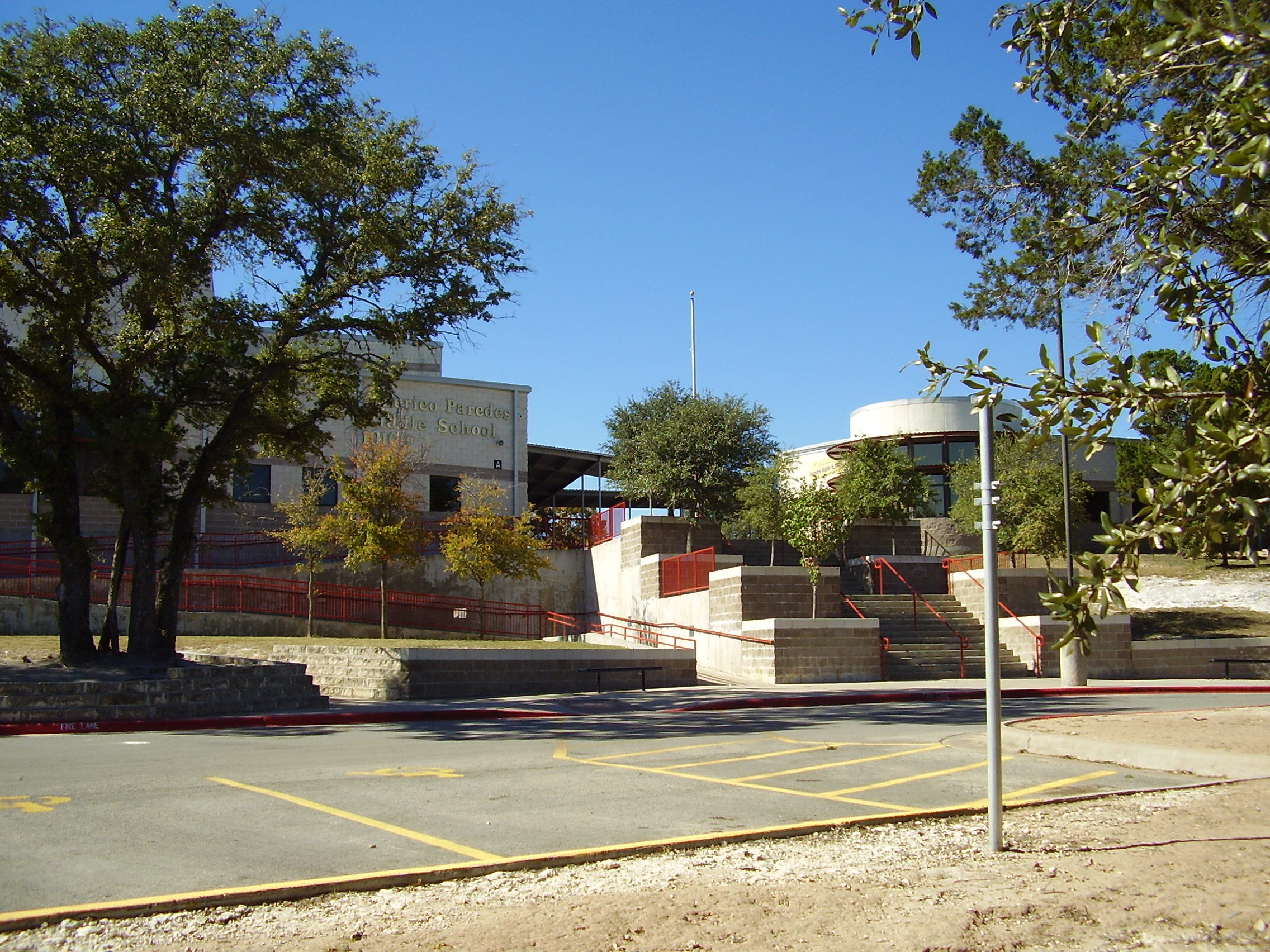
Paredes Middle School

=== Zoned middle schools ===
Middle School	Established	Grades	Enrollment (2023–24)	Namesake	Mascot
Bailey Middle School	1993	6-8	785	Gordon Arthur Bailey	Bears
Bedichek Middle School	1972-2026	6-8	638	Roy Bedichek	Bobcats
Bertha Sadler Means Young Women's Leadership Academy (2014–present) Pearce Middle School (1958-2014)	1958	6-8	346	Bertha Sadler Means (2014–present) James Edwin Pearce (1958-2014)	Dragons
Burnet Middle School	1961-2026?..	6-8	799	David Gouverneur Burnet	Sailors
Covington Middle School	1986	6-8	599	Verna Young Covington & Weldon Joseph Covington	Colts
Dobie Middle School	1973	6-8	544	James Frank Dobie	Roadrunners
Gorzycki Middle School	2009	6-8	1,329	Diane Elaine Gorzycki	Tigers
Gus Garcia Young Men's Leadership Academy (2014–present) Gus Garcia Middle School (2007-2014)	2007	6-8	253	Gustavo Luis Garcia	Dragons
Kealing Middle School	1930	6-8	1,247	Hightower Theodore Kealing	Hornets
Lamar Middle School	1955	6-8	1,100	Mirabeau Buonaparte Lamar	Scotties
Lively Middle School (2019–present) Fulmore Middle School (1911-2019) South Ward School (1886-1911)	1886	6-8	948	Sarah Beth Lively (2019–present) Zachary Taylor Fulmore (1911-2019) South Austin (1886-1911)	Falcons
Marshall Middle School	2023	6-8	214	Dr. General Garwood Marshall	Rams
Martin Middle School	1966-2026	7-8	240	Samuel Lawton Martin	Eagles
Mendez Middle School	1987	7-8	203	Consuelo Herrera Mendez	Mavericks
Murchison Middle School	1967	6-8	1,218	Eugene A. Murchison	Matadors
O. Henry Middle School	1953	6-8	691	William Sydney Porter	Mustangs
Paredes Middle School	2000-2026	6-8	625	Américo Paredes	Pumas
Small Middle School	1999	6-8	1,260	Charles Clinton Small	Cougars
Webb Middle School	1968-2026?..	6-8	532	Walter Prescott Webb	Wildcats

=== Other middle school programs ===
The Kealing and Lively magnet programs accept students from across AISD on a basis of academic record and provide them with a more advanced program. The magnet programs are housed in their respective schools, but provide some different classes to their students.

Host Campus	Other programs
Kealing Middle School	Kealing Magnet Program
Lively Middle School	Lively Humanities and Law Magnet for International Studies

== Elementary schools ==
Images of AISD Elementary Schools

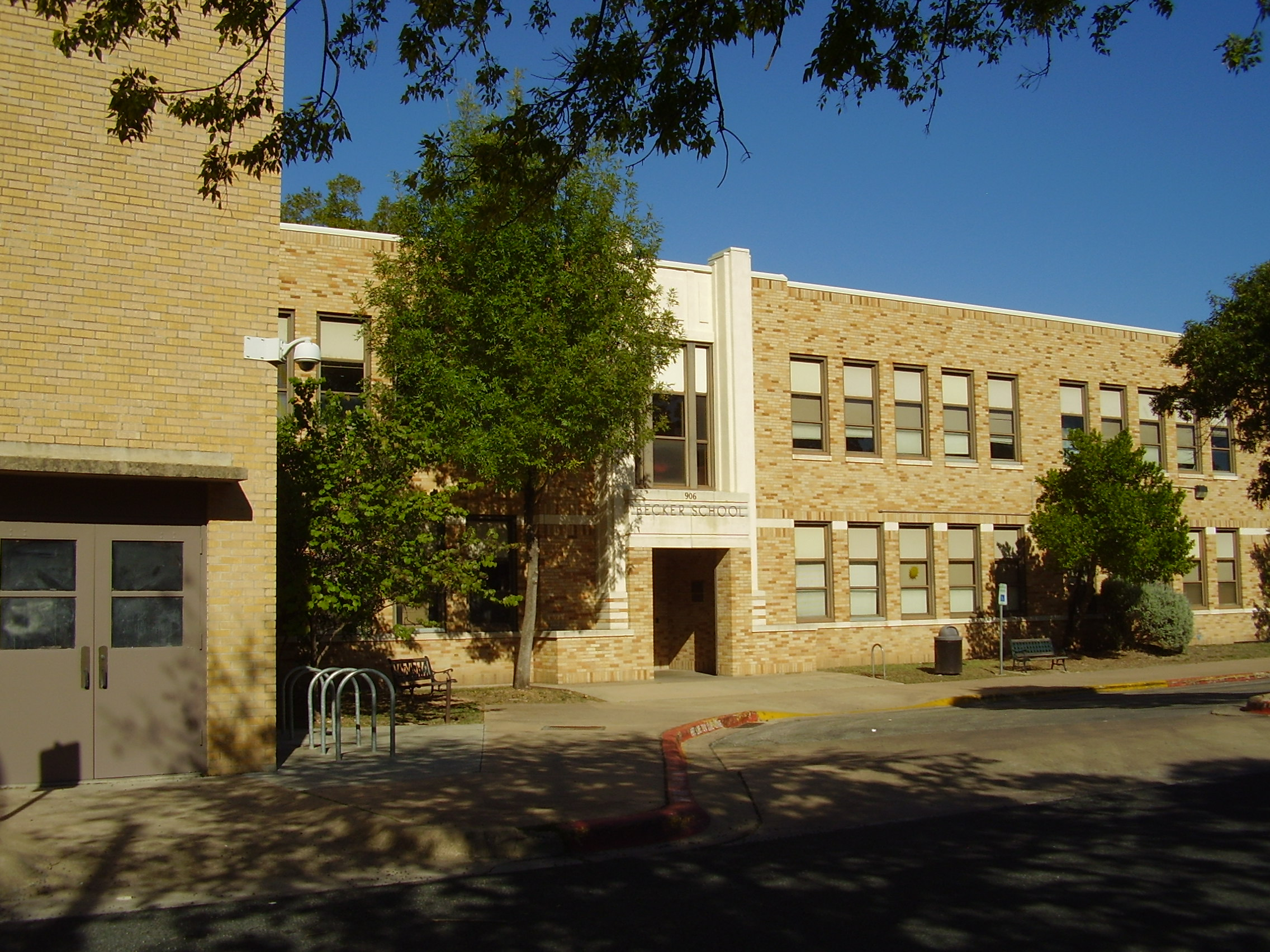
Becker Elementary School

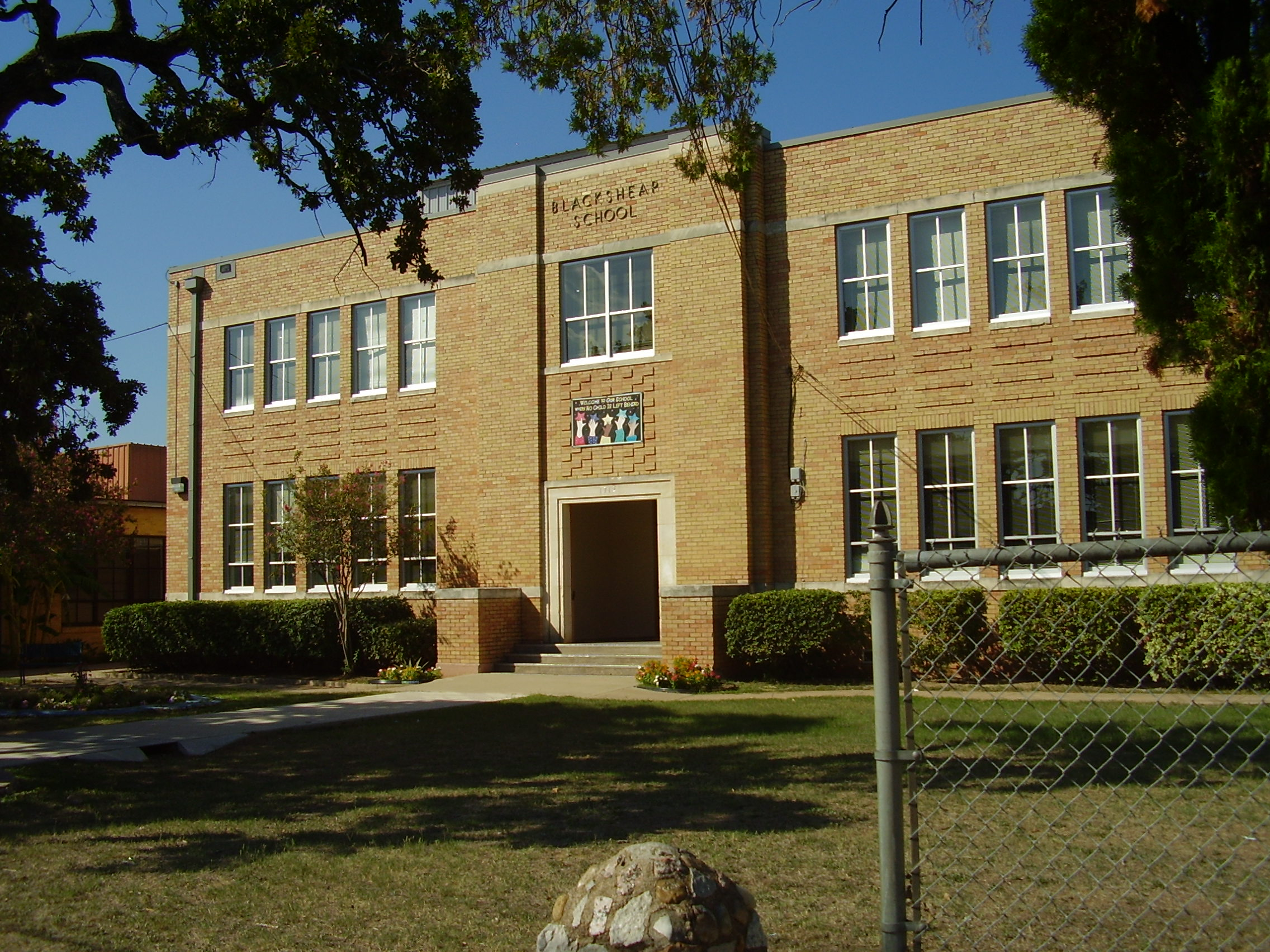
Blackshear Elementary Fine Arts Academy

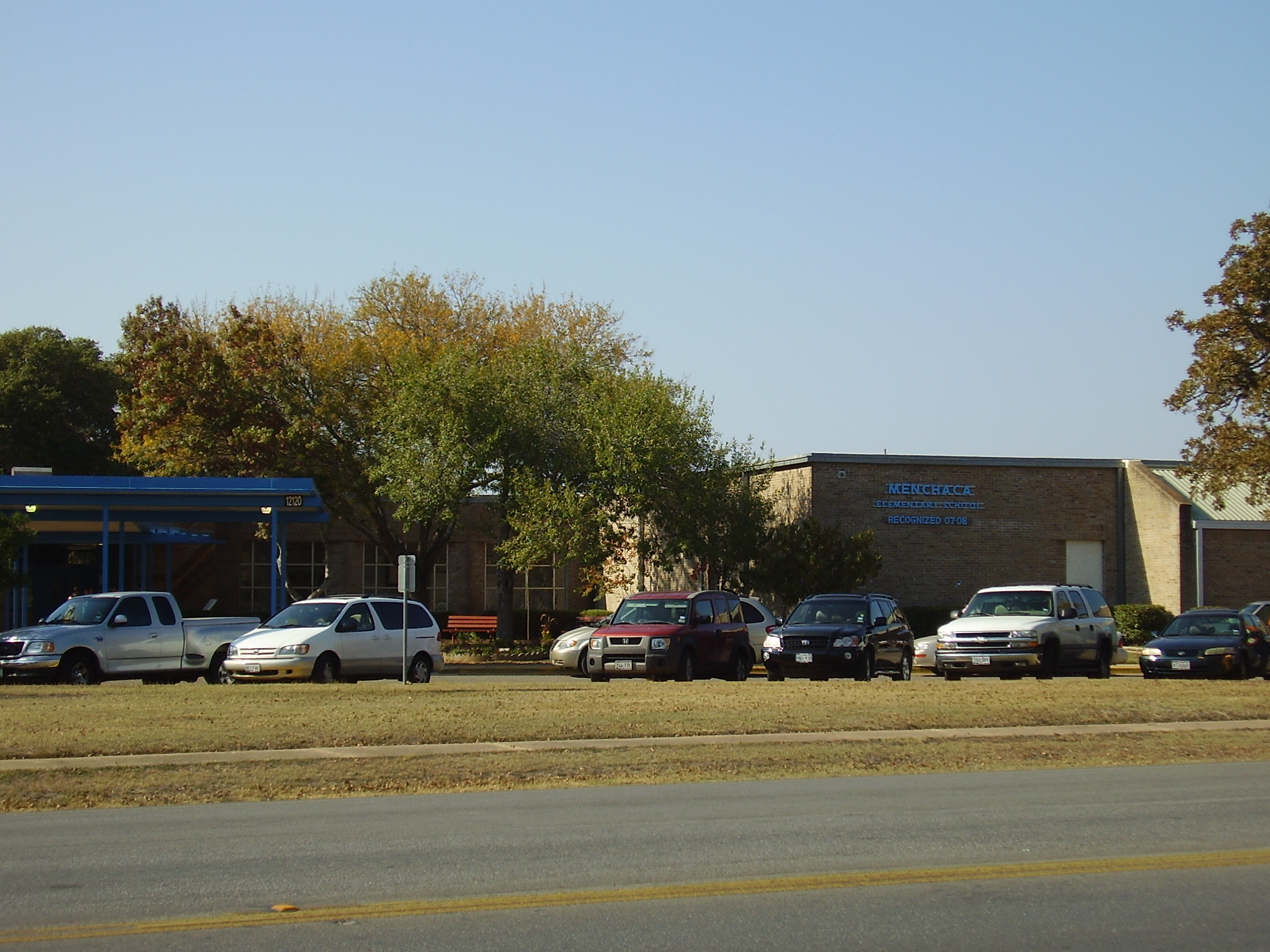
Menchaca Elementary School

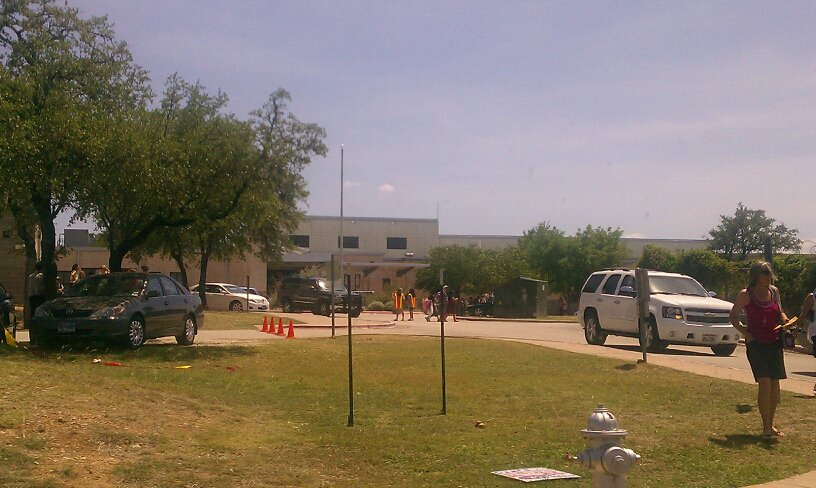
Mills Elementary

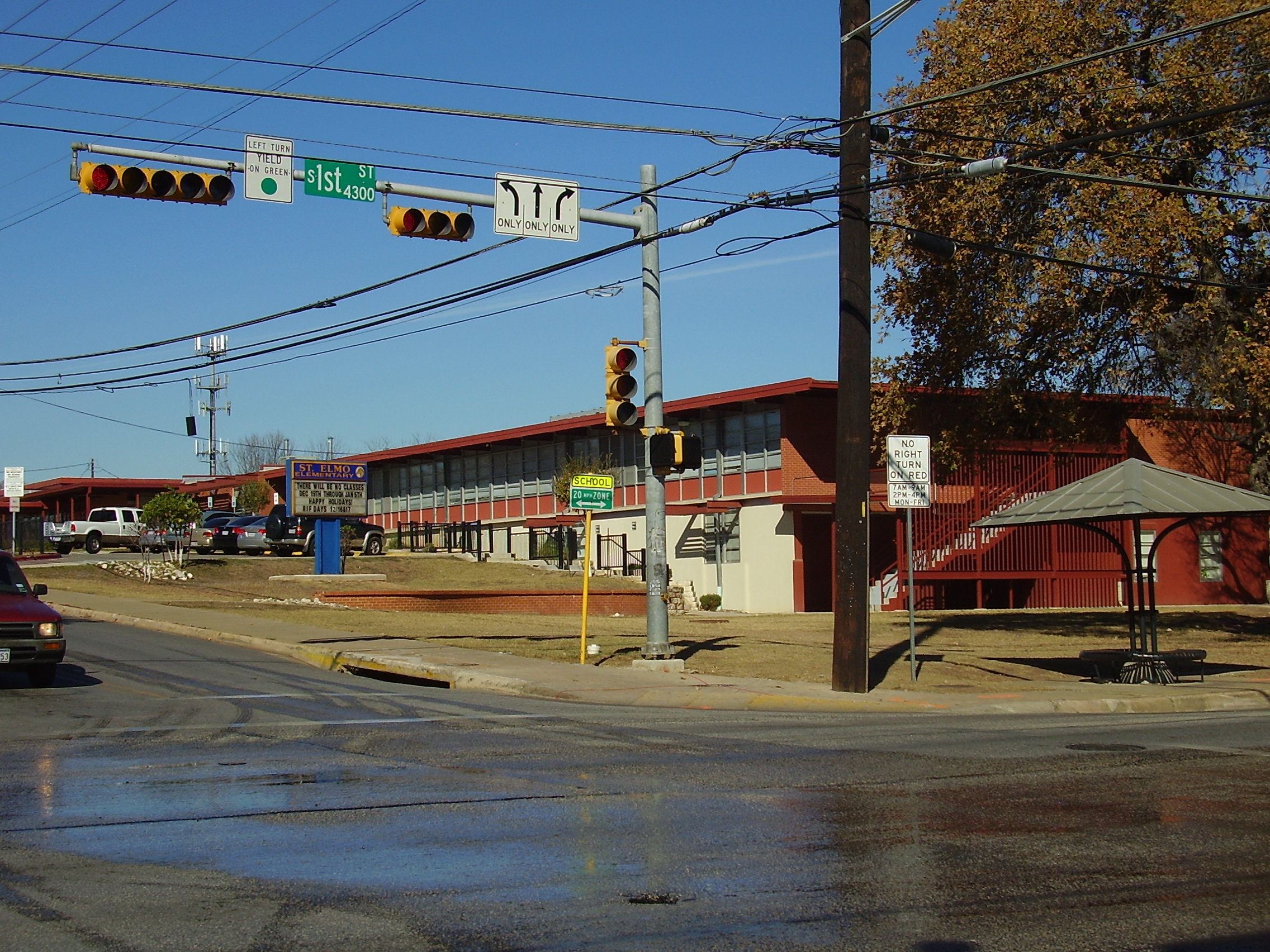
St. Elmo Elementary School

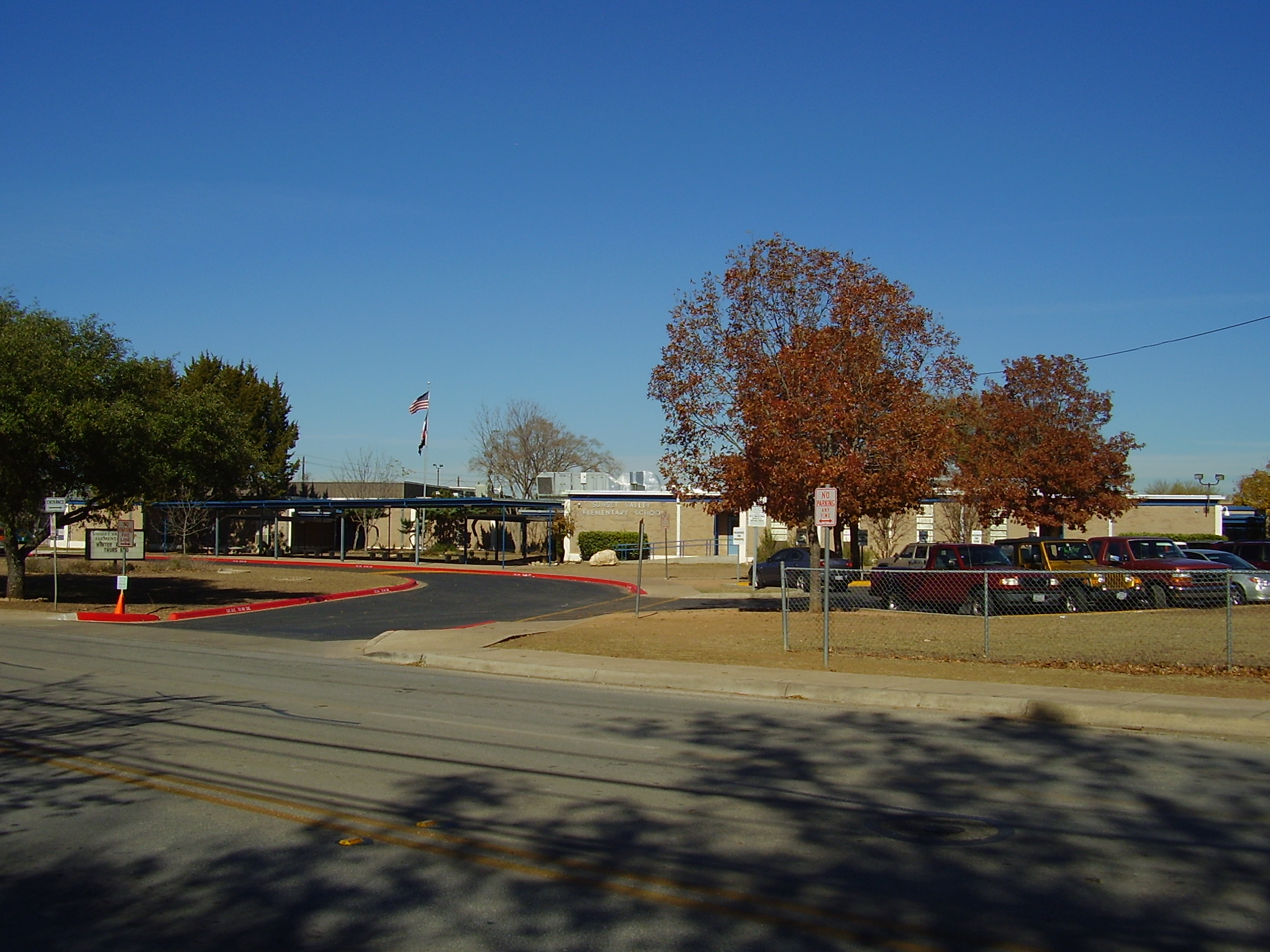
Sunset Valley Elementary School

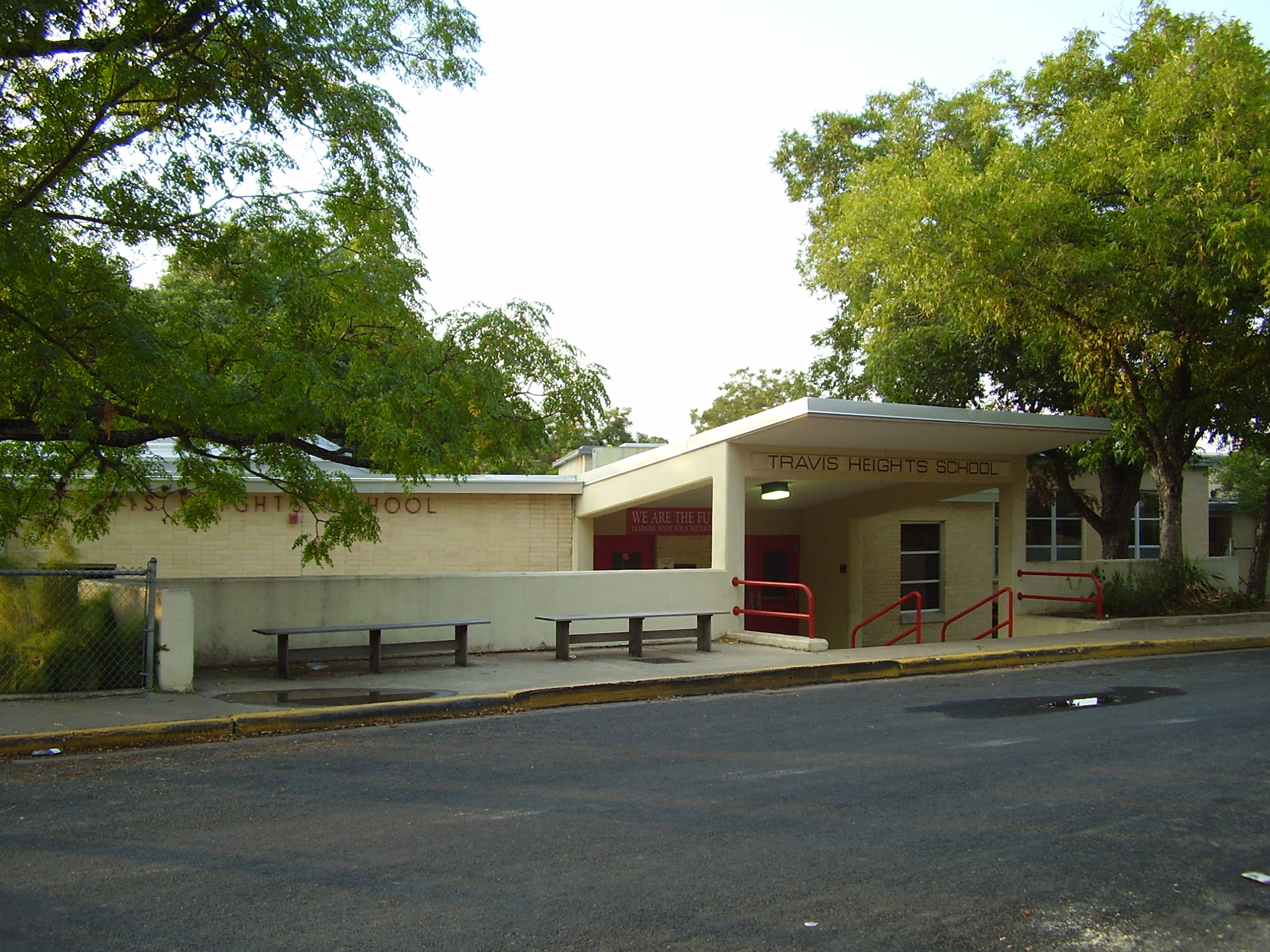
Travis Heights Elementary School

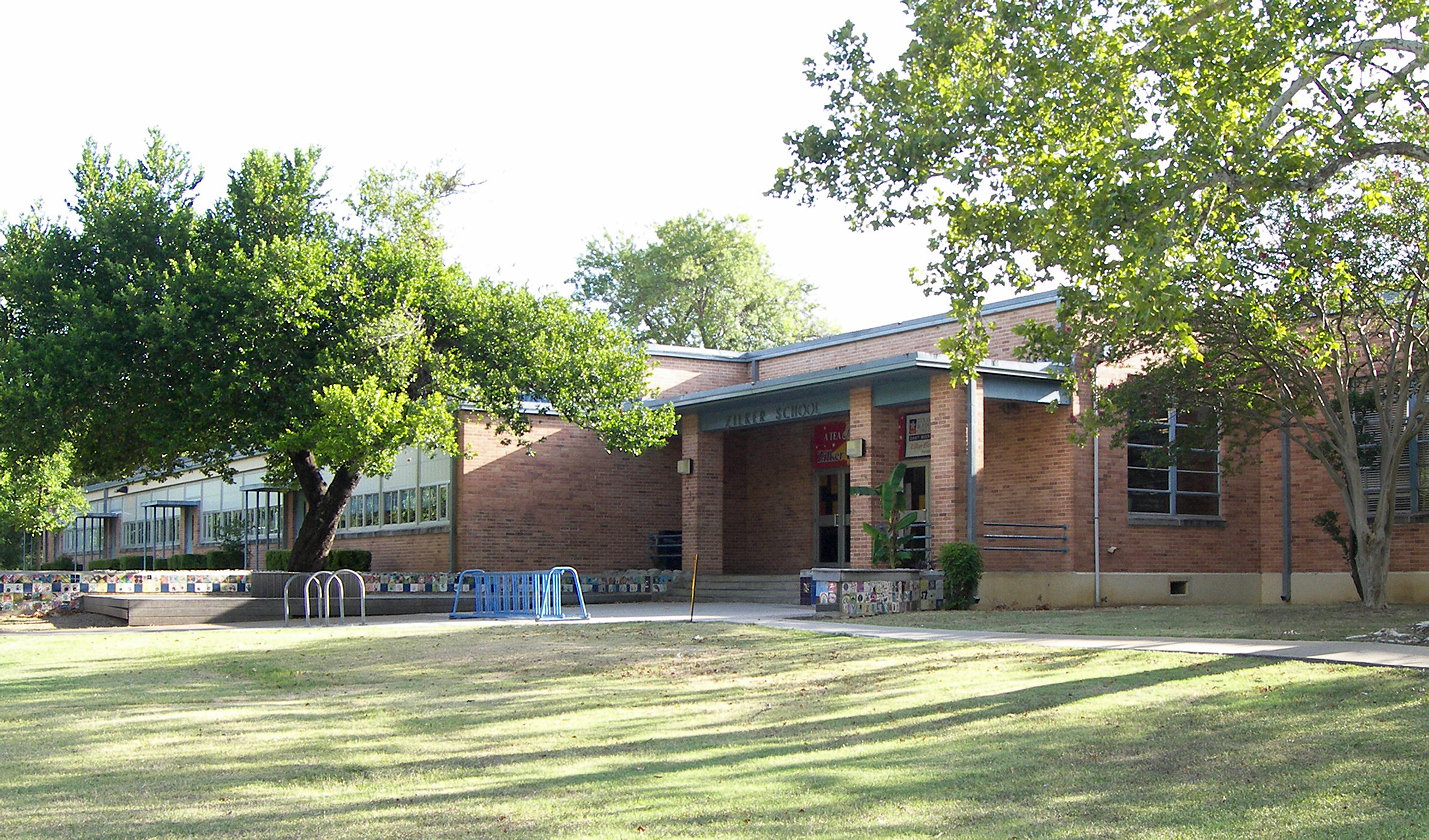
Zilker Elementary School

- Allison Elementary School
- Andrews Elementary School
- Baldwin Elementary School
- Baranoff Elementary School
- Barbara Jordan Elementary School
- Barton Hills Elementary School
- Bear Creek Elementary School
- Blackshear Elementary Fine Arts Academy (1891)
  - National Blue Ribbon School in 2015
- Blanton Elementary School
  - National Blue Ribbon School in 2000–01
- Blazier Elementary School
- Boone Elementary School
- Brentwood Elementary School
- Bryker Woods Elementary School
- Campbell Elementary Media & Performing Arts Institute
- Casey Elementary School
- Casis Elementary School
- Clayton Elementary School
- Cook Elementary School
- Cowan Elementary School
- Cunningham Elementary School
- Davis Elementary School
- Doss Elementary School
- Galindo Elementary School
- Govalle Elementary School
- Graham Elementary School
- Guerrero Thompson Elementary School
- Gullett Elementary School
- Harris Elementary School
- Hart Elementary School
- Highland Park Elementary School
  - National Blue Ribbon School in 1991–92 and 2006
- Hill Elementary School
  - National Blue Ribbon School in 1993–94
- Houston Elementary School
- Joslin Elementary School
- Kiker Elementary School
- Kocurek Elementary School
- Langford Elementary School
- Lee Elementary School
  - National Blue Ribbon School in 1991–92
- Linder Elementary School
- Maplewood Elementary School
- Mathews Elementary School (1916)
- McBee Elementary School
- Menchaca Elementary School (1884)
- Mills Elementary School
- Norman-Sims Elementary School
- Oak Hill Elementary School
- Oak Springs Elementary School
- Odom Elementary School
- Ortega Elementary School
  - National Blue Ribbon School in 1993–94
- Overton Elementary School
- Padron Elementary School
- Palm Elementary School
- Patton Elementary School
- Pecan Springs Elementary School
- Perez Elementary School
- Pickle Elementary School
- Pillow Elementary School
  - 2004 National Blue Ribbon School
- Pleasant Hill Elementary School
- Reilly Elementary School
  - National Blue Ribbon School in 2020
- Rodriguez Elementary School
- Sanchez Elementary School
- St. Elmo Elementary School (1914)
- Summitt Elementary School
- T. A. Brown Elementary School
  - National Blue Ribbon School in 1996–97
- Travis Heights Elementary School (1939)
- Uphaus Early Childhood Center
- Walnut Creek Elementary School
  - National Blue Ribbon School in 1996–97
- Williams Elementary School
- Wooldridge Elementary School
- Wooten Elementary School
- Zavala Elementary School
  - National Blue Ribbon School in 1996–97
- Zilker Elementary School
  - National Blue Ribbon School in 1998–99

== Alternative Education ==
- Rosedale School- It specifically serves kids with special needs

== Facilities ==
=== Headquarters ===
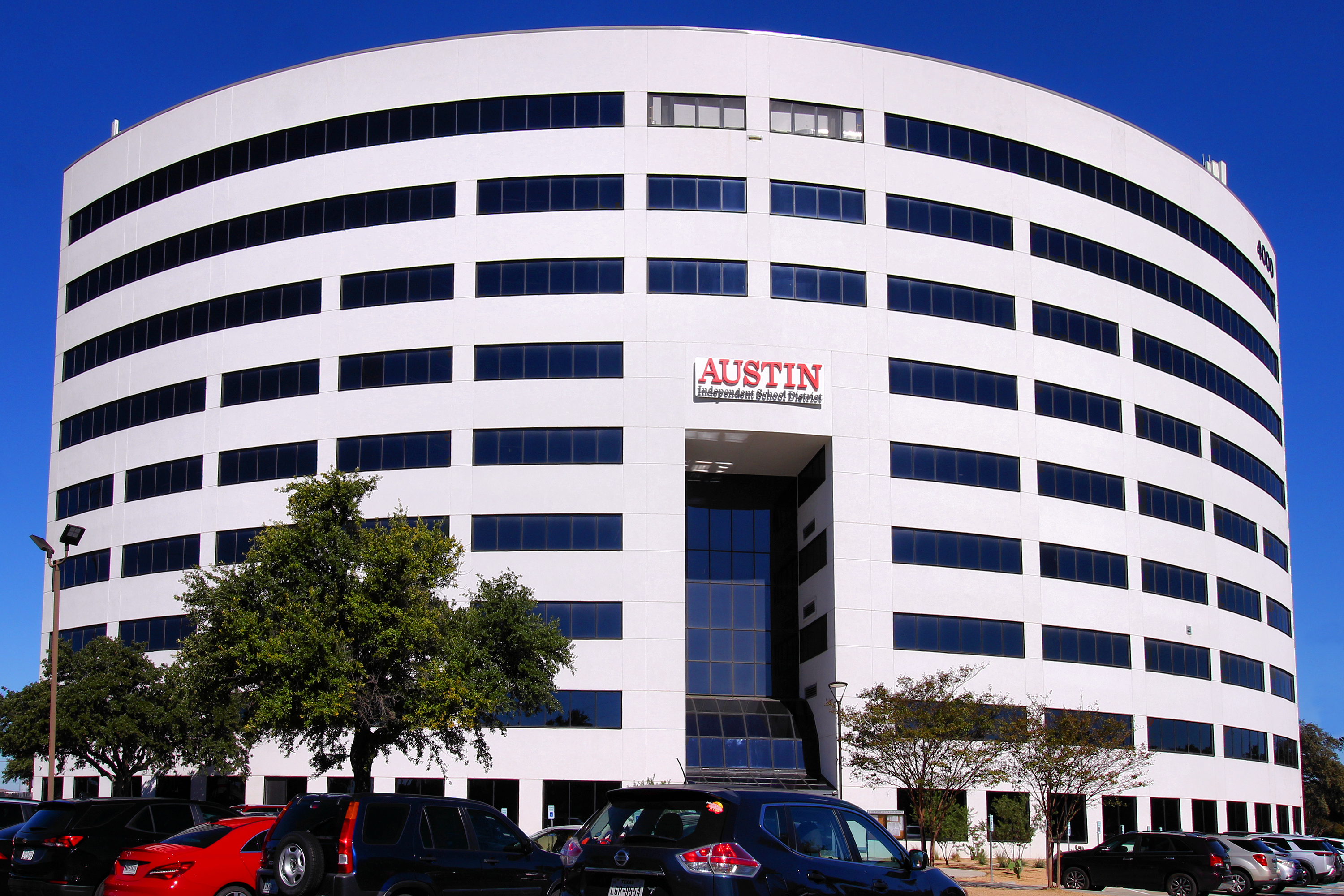
Current headquarters

The headquarters are at the intersection of Interstate 35 and Ben White. The 142,000-square-foot (13,200 m^{2}) structure has nine stories.

For a period prior to 1989, the Austin ISD headquarters were on Guadalupe Street, adjacent to the Texas Department of Public Safety headquarters. In 1989, the Texas House of Representatives passed a bill allowing DPS to acquire the former Austin ISD headquarters. That building was known as the Irby B. Carruth Administration Building.

From circa 1994 to 2019, the headquarters were at the Carruth Administration Center, on 1111 West Sixth Street. That building was sold, along with another Austin ISD facility, the Baker Center, in 2016. Prior to the sale of the Baker Center, it had been used as an Elementary, Middle, and Alternative High school, before eventually becoming AISD's administrative headquarters.

The Schlosser Development Corporation purchased the West Sixth facility. The district used the money from those sales to buy the current headquarters. From around July to September 2019 the headquarters moved to the current location. The employees who went to the current headquarters came from those two sold properties and one other property.

=== Athletic facilities ===
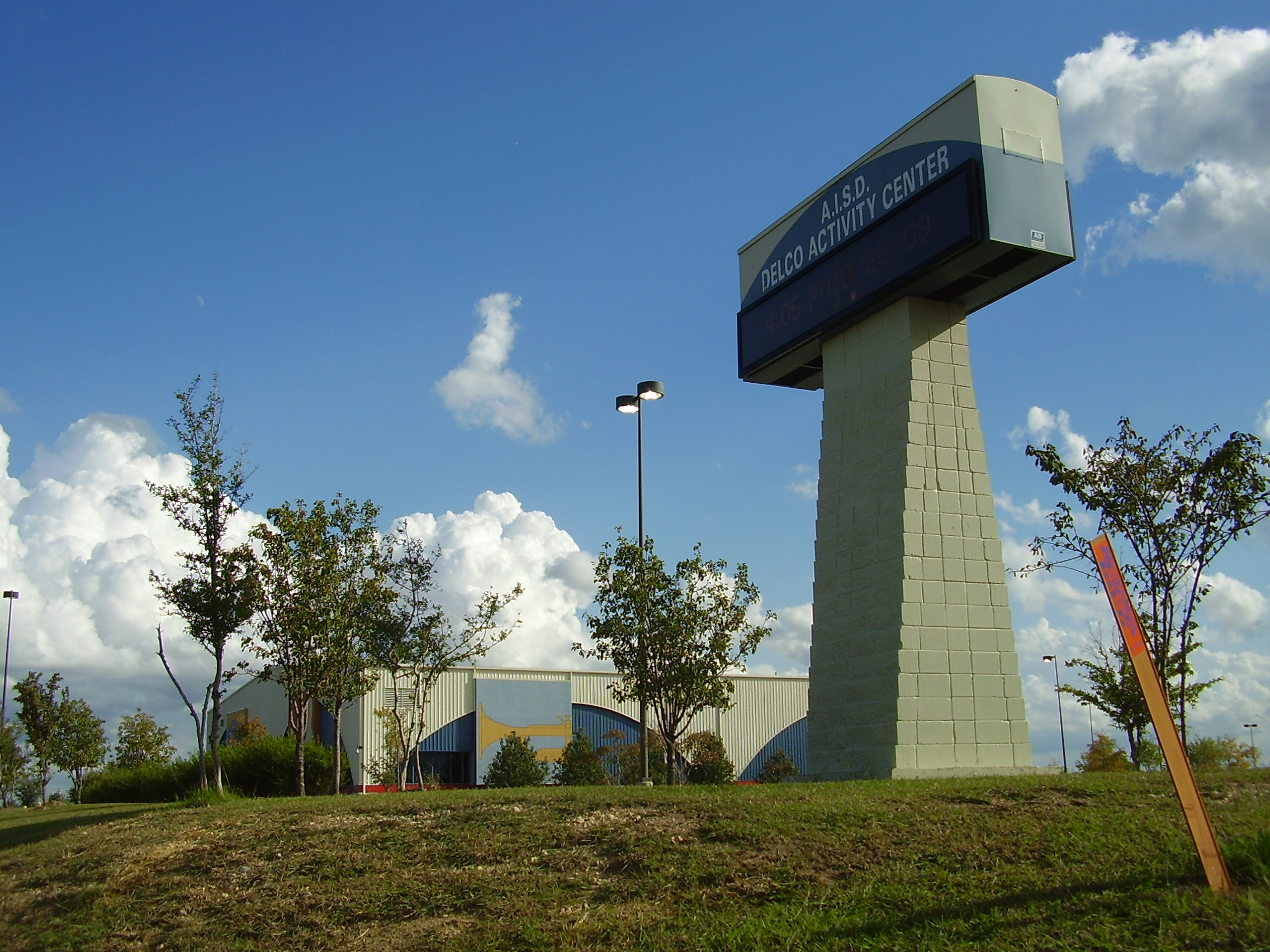
Delco Activity Center

- Toney Burger Center (Football, Baseball, Track and field, Basketball, Volleyball, Soccer)
- I.I. Nelson Field (Football, Baseball, Track & Field, Soccer)
- Delco Activity Center (Basketball, Volleyball)
- Ellie Noack Sports Complex (Baseball, Softball, Football, Soccer)
- House Park (Football, Soccer)

== AISD.TV ==
Austin ISD operates AISD.TV on Spectrum and Grande Communications channel 22 and AT&T U-verse channel 99.

== Gallery ==
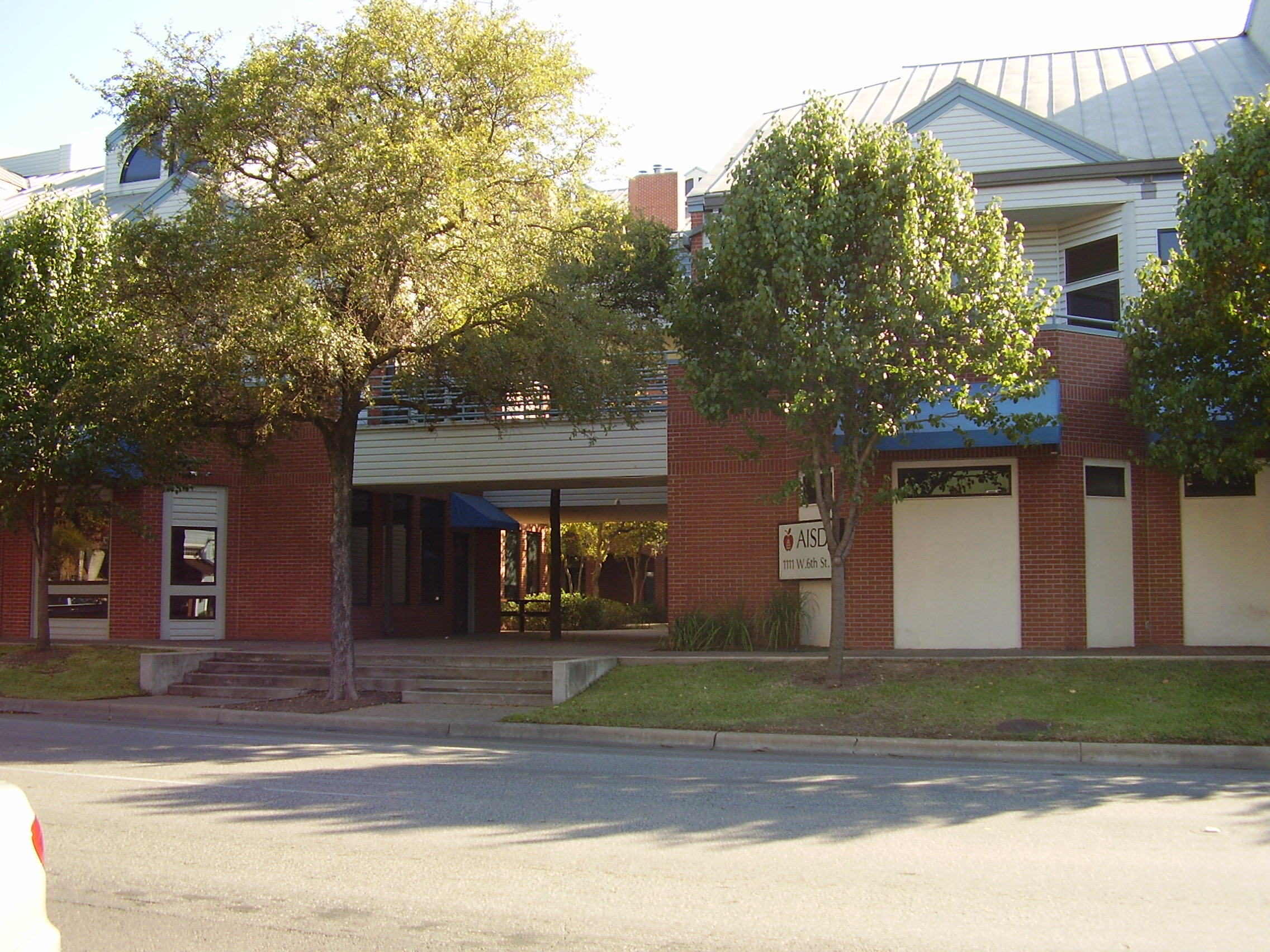
The former Austin Independent School District headquarters

== See also ==
- List of school districts in Texas
- List of high schools in Texas
