= Ann Richards School for Young Women Leaders =

The Ann Richards School for Young Women Leaders

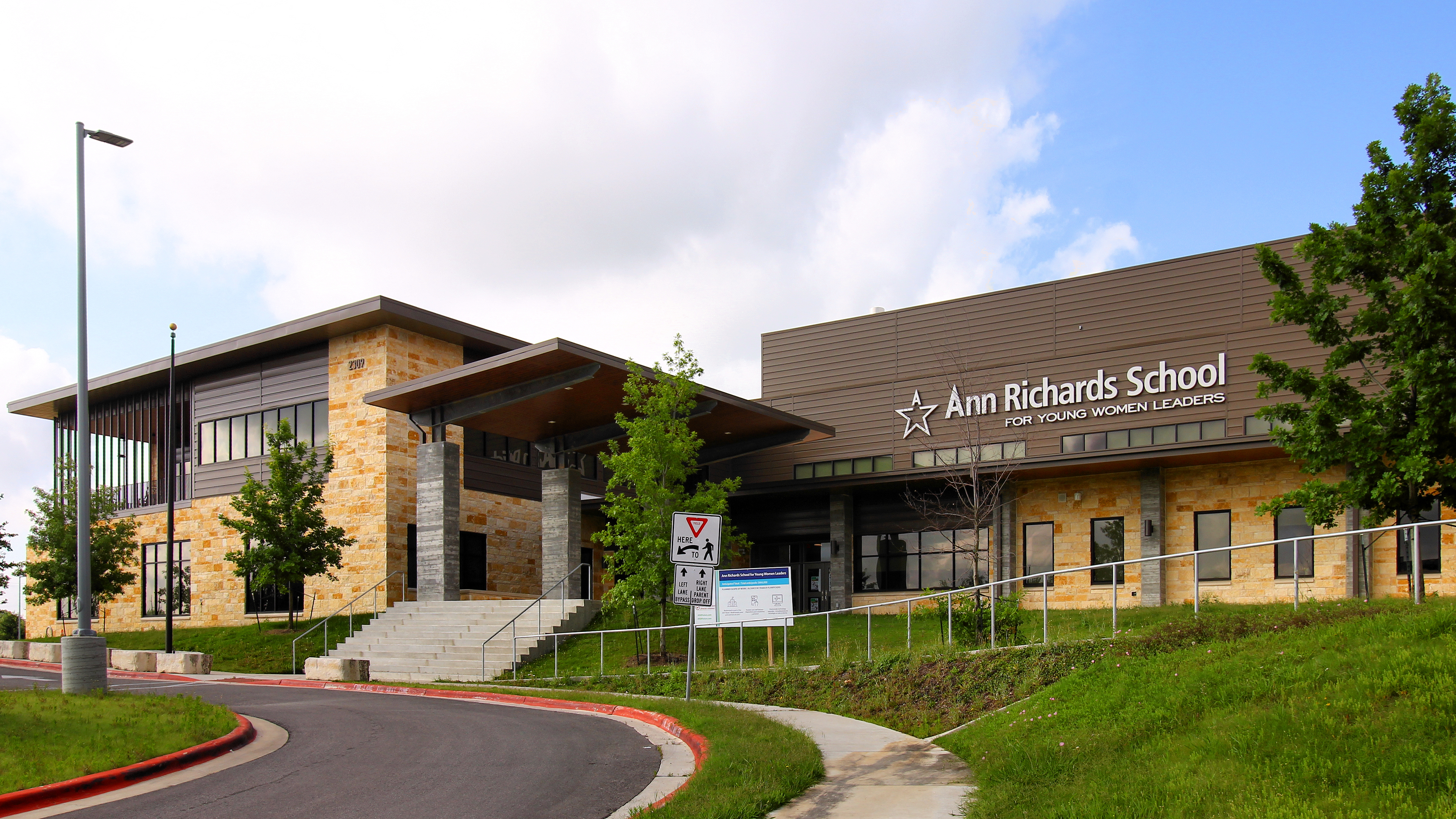
- Current school building

Location
- 2309 Panther Trail; Austin, Texas 78704; United States
- 30.236°N 97.788°W

Information
- Other name: ARS
- School type: Public, Middle school & High school
- Established: August 27, 2007
- School district: Austin Independent School District
- NCES District ID: 4808940
- Educational authority: Texas Education Agency
- Superintendent: Matias Segura
- Area trustee: Andrew Gonzales
- CEEB code: 440382
- NCES School ID: 480894011354
- Principal: Christina Almaraz Ortiz
- Faculty: 40.35 FTE
- Teaching staff: 52.70 (on an FTE basis)
- Grades: 6–12
- Gender: Single-sex female
- Enrollment: 920 (2024-2025)
  - Grade 6: 161
  - Grade 7: 163
  - Grade 8: 160
  - Grade 9: 125
  - Grade 10: 95
  - Grade 11: 102
  - Grade 12: 114
- Student to teacher ratio: 17.46
- Colors: Blue and White
- Athletics: annrichardsathletics.com
- Sports: Volleyball, Cross Country, Soccer, Basketball, Track, Tennis, Swimming, Roller Derby
- Mascot: Stars
- Website: annrichardsschool.org

The Ann Richards School for Young Women Leaders is an all-girls college preparatory public school of choice for students in grades 6–12 located in Austin, Texas. The school is named for former Texas governor Ann Richards and is part of the Austin Independent School District. In 2015 it was named the 19th most challenging high school in the nation by The Washington Post.

== History ==
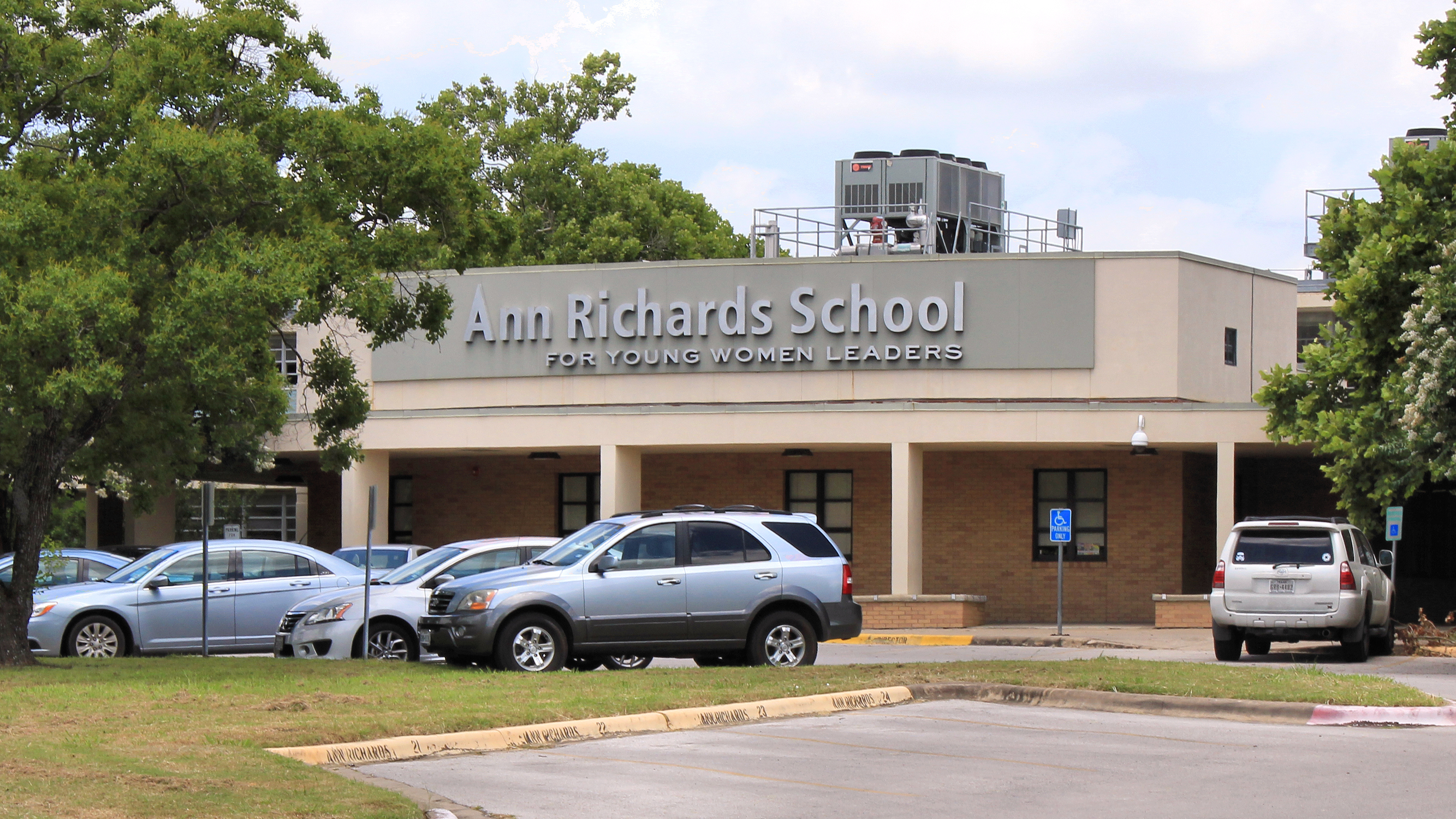
Former school building

The Ann Richards School (commonly referred to as "ARS") was established in 2007 in the former building of Porter Middle School in south Austin. Former Texas governor Ann Richards took part in making the school possible, but Richards died before she could see the school open. Actress Sandra Bullock and the school's founding principal, Jeanne Goka, also took part in opening the school. In its first year the school was opened to sixth- and seventh-grade students, and a grade was added each year until the 2012–2013 school year, when the school's oldest students reached the twelfth grade; in June 2013 the school's first senior class graduated. Although the school was originally housed in the former building of Porter Middle School, the school was rebuilt in stages following a 2017 bond and the new building was fully completed in 2022.

The Ann Richards School is part of the Young Women's Preparatory Network (formerly the Foundation for the Education of Young Women), the National Coalition of Girls' Schools, and the Young Women's Leadership Network; it is a "sister school" to the Irma Lerma Rangel Young Women's Leadership School in Dallas, Texas and the Young Women's Leadership School of East Harlem in Harlem, New York.

The school has also had various notable visitors including Chelsea Clinton and Kirsten Gillibrand and Angela Davis.

== Admissions ==
Admission to the school is only granted in grades six through ten. The admissions are classified as "competitive" with 150 acceptances in the sixth grade and no waiting list. Admissions are based on prospective students' essay of interest, teacher recommendations, recent report cards, attendance records and standardized test scores. Qualified applicants are then placed in a lottery and are drawn at random, where 75% are admitted from Title I schools.

== Academics ==
The school's curriculum focuses on leadership, STEM subjects, and college readiness. Upon entering high school, students choose between course schedules emphasizing one of three "pathways": biomedical science, engineering, or media technology. Additionally, high school students are required to take Advanced Placement (AP) courses, while middle school students are required to take Pre-AP courses. Middle School students also take STEM based electives and PLTW courses.

The school also has a comprehensive wellness program and students are required to participate in yoga once per week, as well as enjoy time outdoors. Students also take athletics and physical education classes and yearly wellness courses that focus on body image and health. The Ann Richards School is also part of the CDC's CATCH school program, designed to improve physical activity and diet.

== Extracurricular activities ==
The Ann Richards School offers a variety of extracurricular activities is notable for its success in extracurricular activities at the district and state level.

The student-run yearbook, "The Constellation," and the student-run newspaper, "The Polaris Press," are popular among students. High school students can participate in Texas Youth and Government which includes Model United Nations and Mock Trial. A number of STEM-related groups are also available including a robotics club. The school also offers Theatre, Band, Orchestra, Choir, and Visual Arts.

== Athletics ==
=== Cross Country ===
The Ann Richard School's high school cross country team has consistently placed 1st or 2nd in both the JV and Varsity divisions of the District meet, even sending runners to the Regional and State Meets as well.

=== Volleyball ===
The school's high school volleyball team played its first varsity season in 2012. The team has won multiple district titles since 2012.

== The Ann Richards School Foundation ==
The Ann Richards School Foundation is a non-profit organization that funds The Ann Richards School for Young Women Leaders. Ann Richards' daughter, Ellen Richards, is one of the foundation's directors. The Ann Richards School Foundation held the annual "Ann Richards Birthday Bash" as a fundraiser to the Ann Richards School from 2007 to 2013. In 2012, the Ann Richards Birthday Bash was held at the home of cyclist Lance Armstrong. In 2013 the Birthday Bash was replaced with the annual "Reach for the Stars" event held in May to celebrate the achievements of graduating seniors. The event honors notable speakers such as Brené Brown.
