= Akins High School =

Coordinates: 30.1492°N 97.8008°W

W. Charles Akins High School

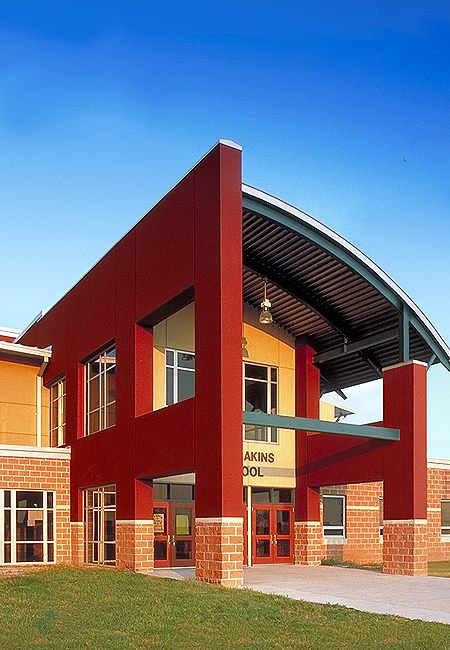

Location
- 10701 S. First Street; Austin, Texas 78748

Information
- Motto: Connecting Today's Challenges to Tomorrow's Successes
- Founded: 2000
- School district: Austin Independent School District
- Principal: Michael Herbin
- Grades: 9-12th
- Enrollment: 2,317 (2025-2026)
- Language: English
- Colors: Navy Blue and Old Gold
- Athletics conference: UIL Class 6A
- Mascot: Eagle
- Website: akinsechs.austinschools.org

W. Charles Akins High School is located in South Austin, Texas, United States. The school is named after William Charles Akins, the first black teacher to work at a high school after desegregation in the Austin Independent School District (AISD). Akins was established in 2000, and is the second newest zoned high school in AISD. With an enrollment over 2700, it is the 2nd largest school in AISD, behind Bowie High School. Akins High School competes in UIL 6A Conference in all athletic and academic competitions.

== History ==
The building had a cost of $34,700,000. The construction and preparation was done 30 days before the scheduled end date.

== Curriculum redesign ==
Beginning in late August 2006, the school opted for students to continue their education following courses modeled through 'Academies'. Under the plan, students choose a path from seven academies, each modeled after varying areas of academics, with the exception of its NTHS program which focuses on project-based learning. In addition to taking the basic required courses for graduation, students choose from electoral and advanced courses within their selected academy. The academies are:

- ABLLE (Academy of Business, Leadership and Legal Enterprises)
- AHA (Arts and Humanities Academy)
- SS (Social Services)
- Green Tech (Agriculture, Environmental Sciences, Veterinary Medicine, and Park Ranger Studies)
- NTHS (New Tech High School)
- STEM (Science, Technology, Engineering and Mathematics)
- ECHS (Early College High School)

== Akins High School Marching Band ==
The Akins High School Marching Band has made multiple trips to the 5A UIL State Marching Competition. In 2006, while being led by band director Gary Faust, the marching band performed their show titled, "The Pines of Rome". This eventually lead the marching band to the finals of the 5A UIL State Marching Contest, an achievement earned only by the 10 best 5A high school marching bands in the state of Texas. As of 2012, Akins High School, Bowie High School, Westlake High School, Cedar Park High School, and Round Rock High School are the only high schools in the Austin–Round Rock–San Marcos Metropolitan Area to have ever had their marching band advance to state finals competition in the 5A category. Akins also advanced to the state level competition in 2008. In 2013, the marching band was featured in a PBS documentary called "Marching To Nowhere".

== Journalism ==
Print Journalism is one of the largest majors in the Arts and Humanities Academy of Akins with over 200 students enrolled in the intro classes of Journalism 1 and Photojournalism (now known as Graphic Design and Illustration and Advance Graphic Design and Illustration), as well as the publications classes that produce the student newspaper and the yearbook. The newspaper, The Eagle's Eye, has been recognized in 2006, 2007 and 2010 as one of the best newspapers in the state by the UIL Interscholastic League press conference with the award of the bronze star. In 2010-2011 the Eagle's Eye staff brought home six national awards from Columbia Scholastic Press Association. Publications students have also received awards from state and national organizations for their 2007 literature magazine, WORD, featuring stories, poems, as well as photography prints and artwork of all mediums. The school yearbook, The Aerie, has also won a few state awards.
