= List of Austin neighborhoods =

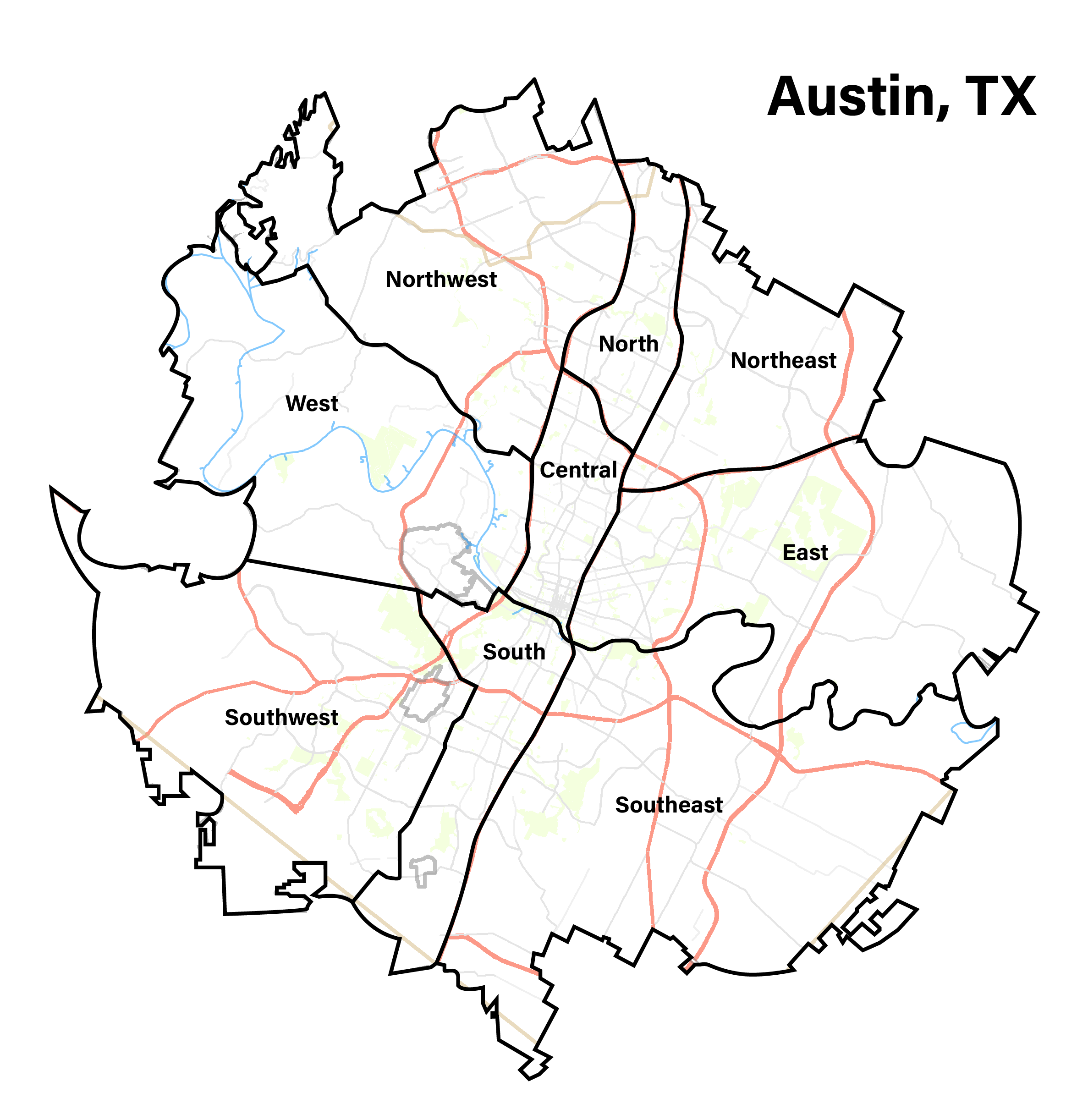
Areas of Austin

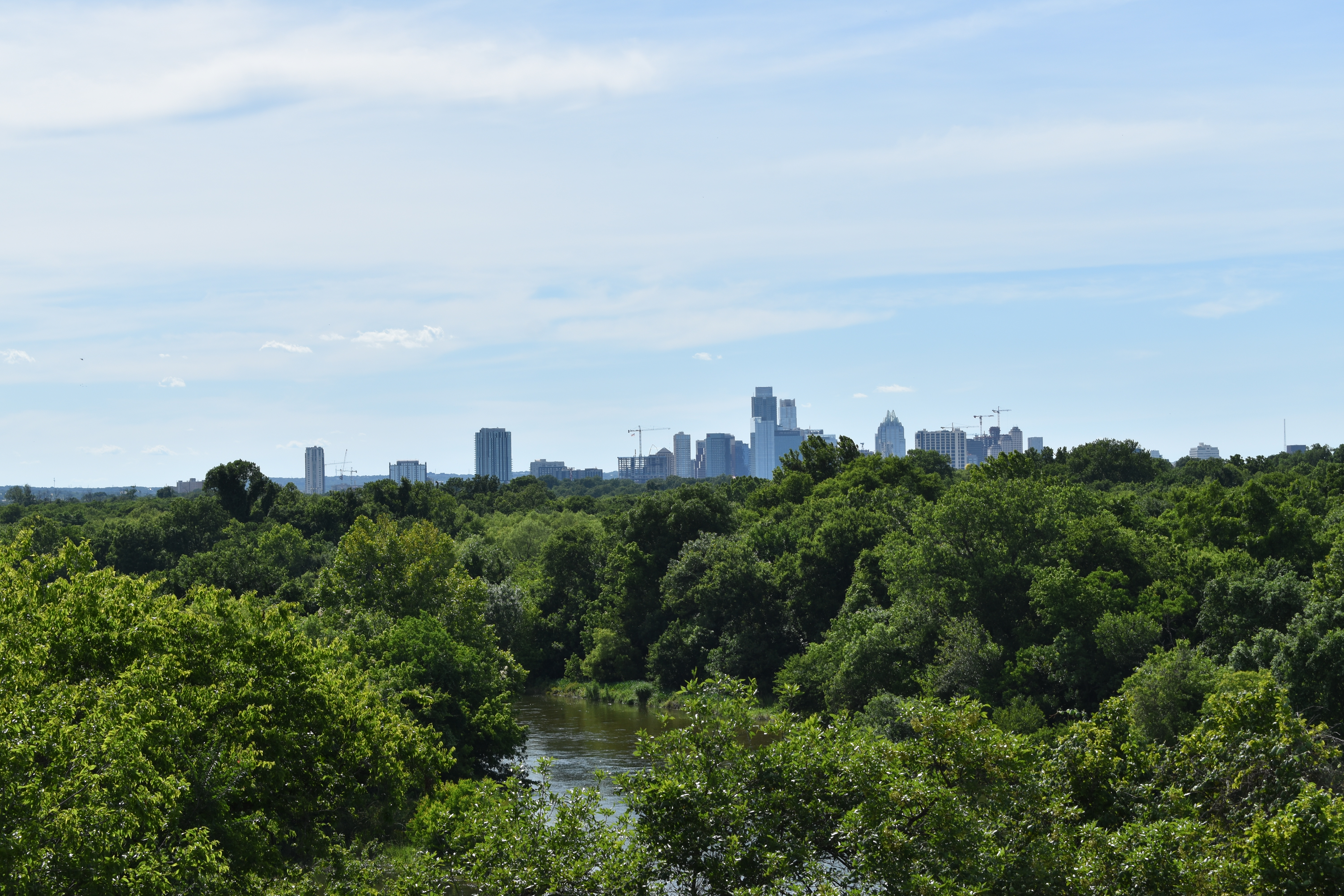
Austin Skyline from Montopolis Bridge looking west

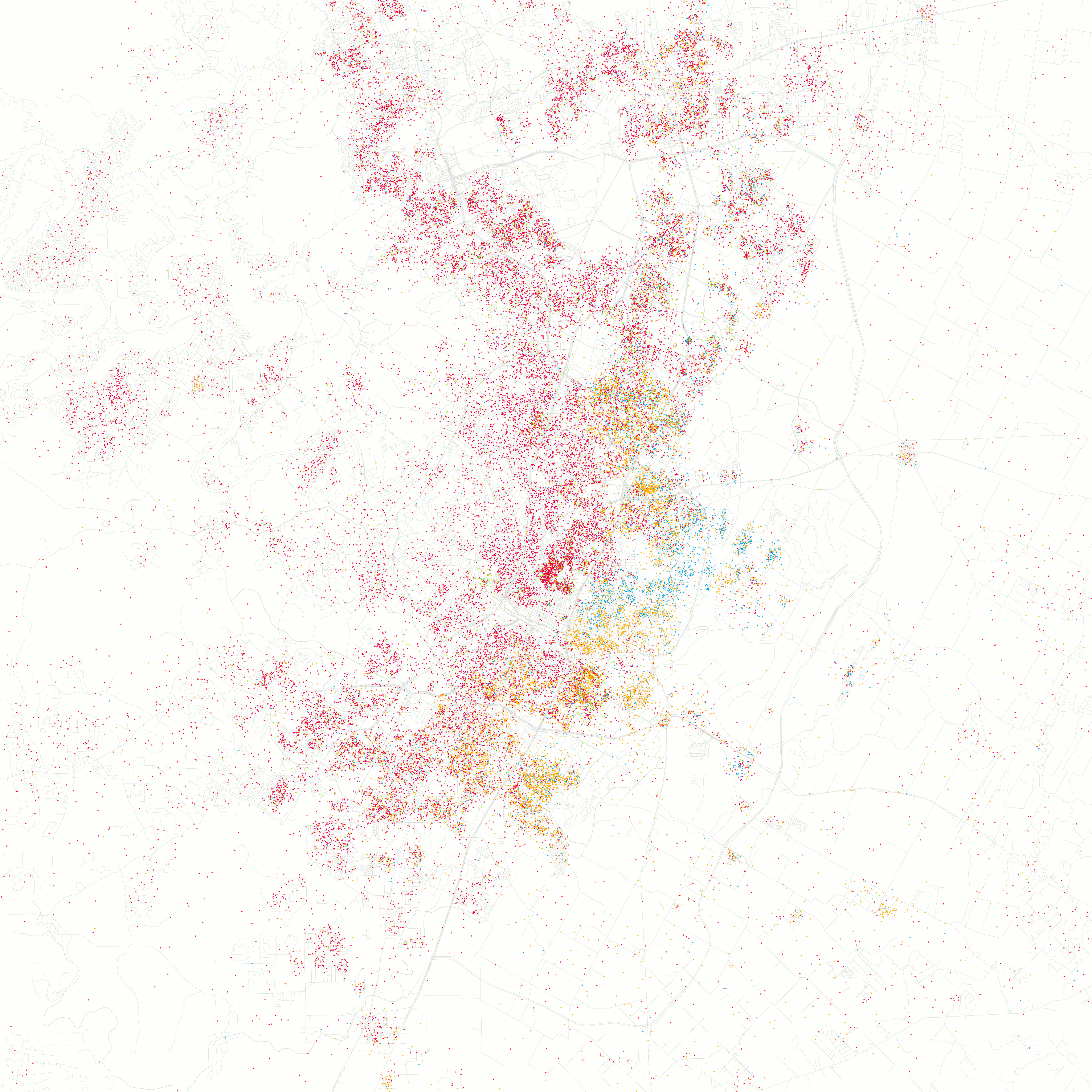
Map of racial and ethnic groups in Austin based on data from the 2000 United States census – each dot denotes 25 persons of primarily White (red), Black (blue), Asian (green), or Hispanic (orange) heritage group

The following is a list of neighborhoods in Austin, Texas. Austin generally runs north–south and is bisected by the Colorado River.

== Central Austin ==
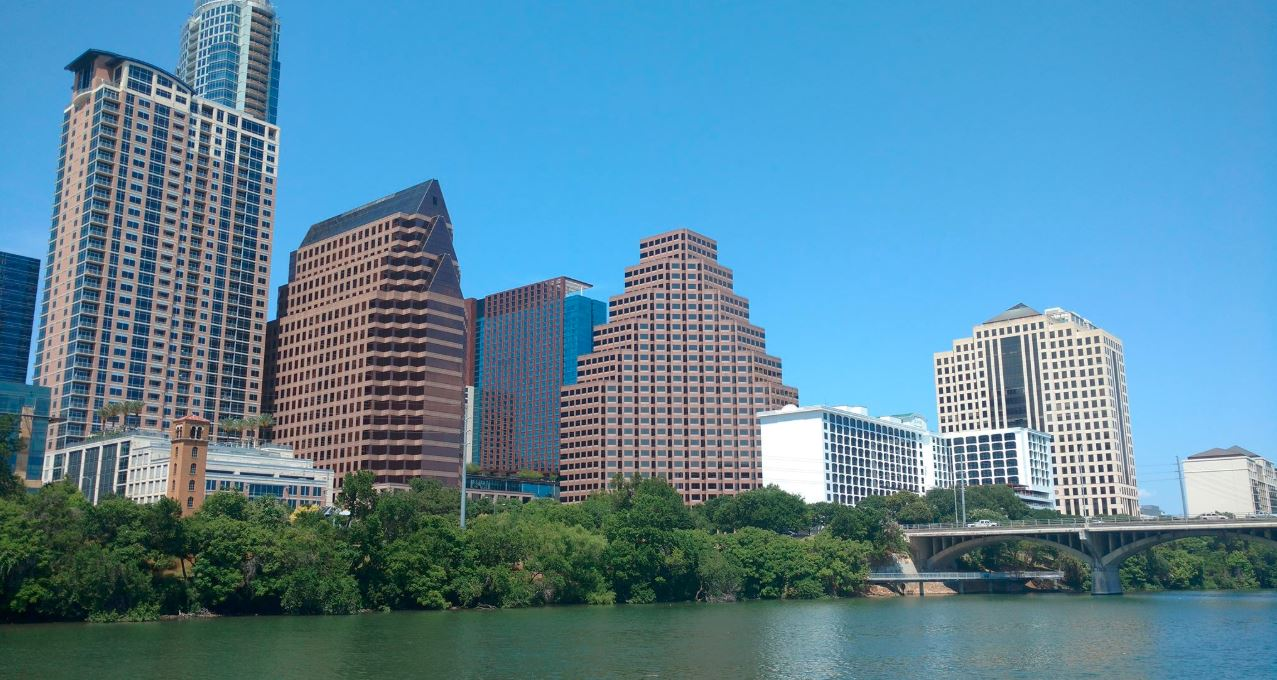
Downtown

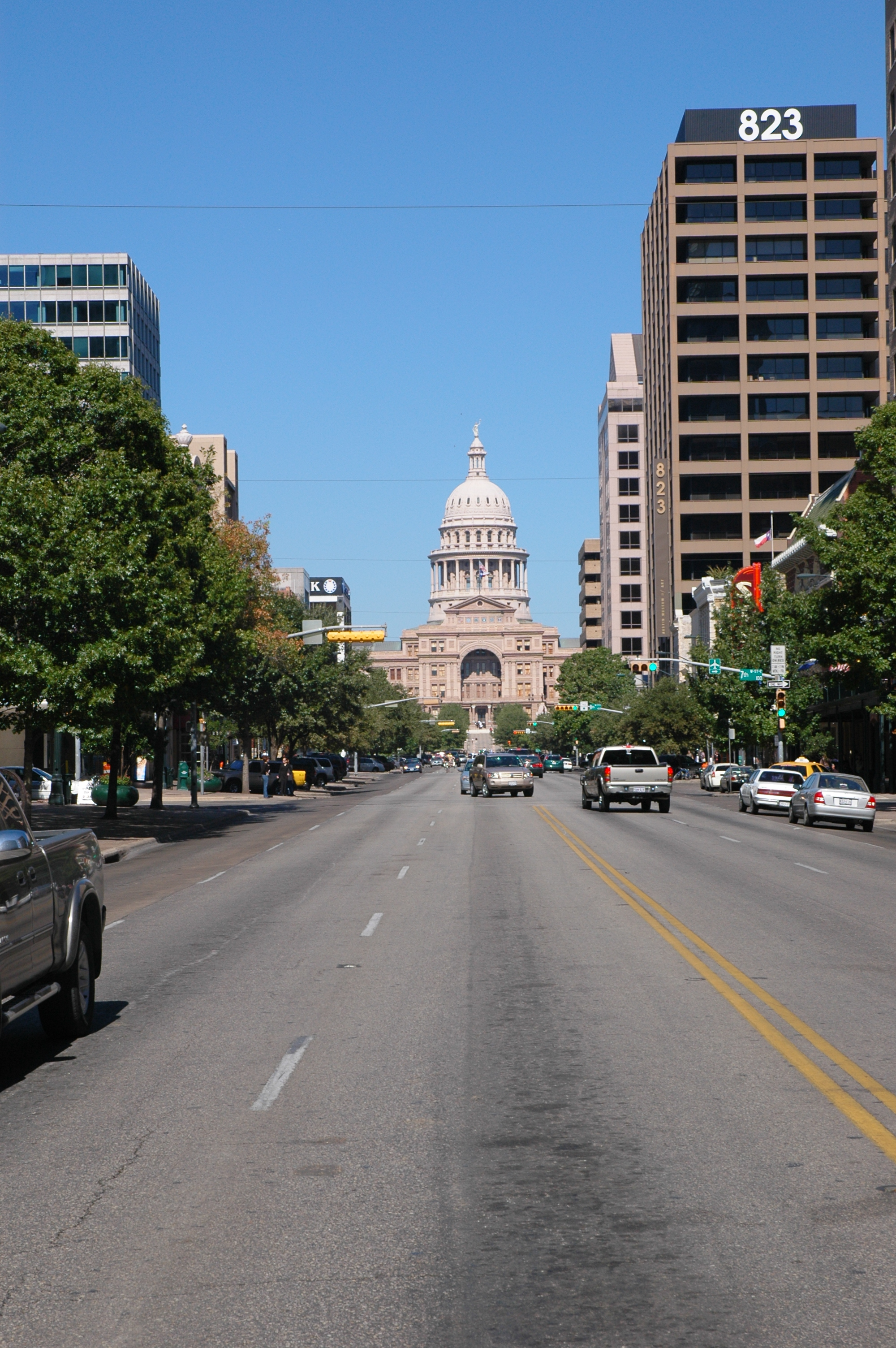
Congress Avenue in Downtown Austin

University of Texas at Austin

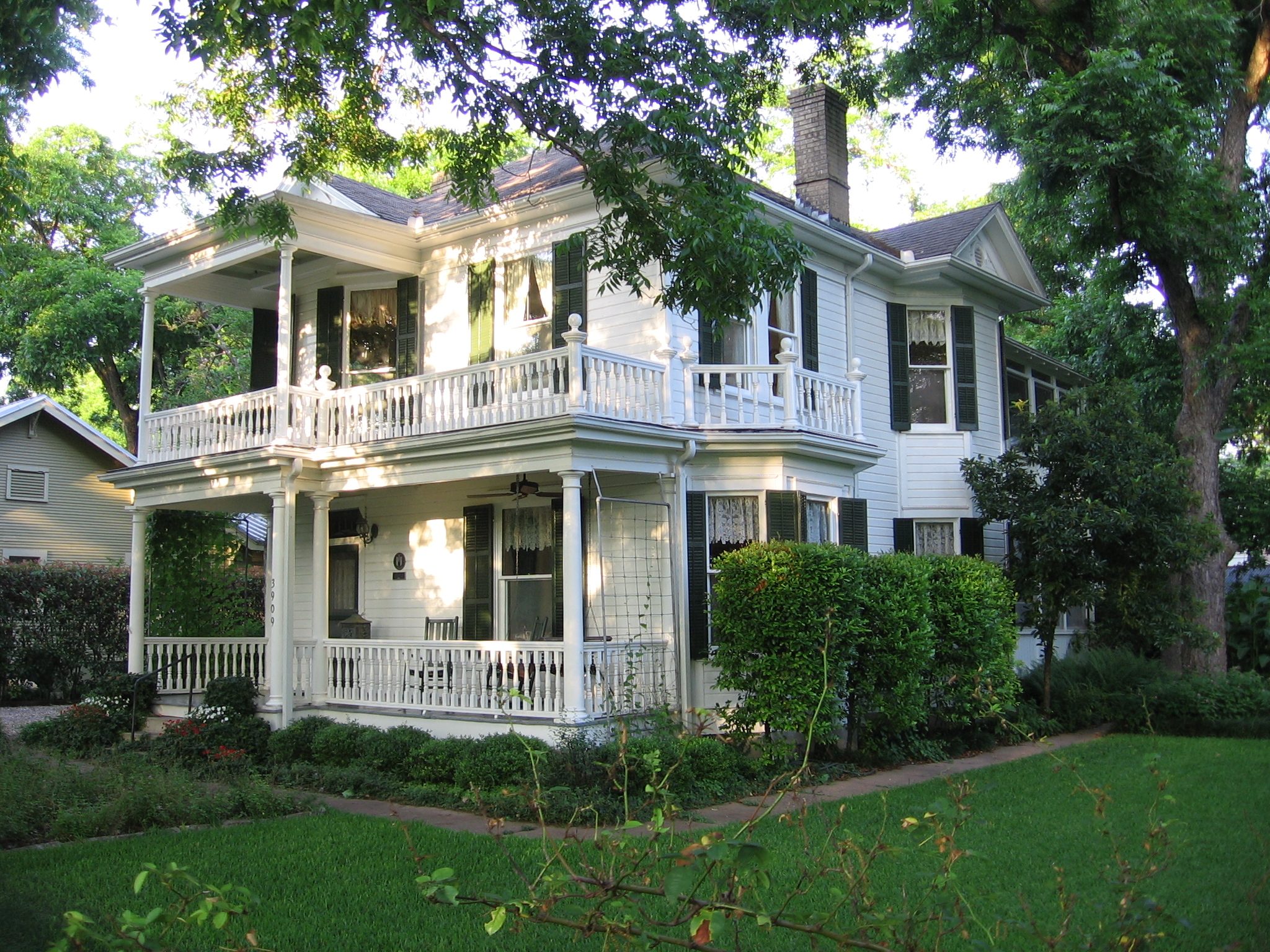
Hyde Park

Central Austin includes the city's Downtown and central neighborhoods. The area is north of the Colorado River and is enclosed by I-35 to the east, approximately 51st Street/North Loop/Hancock Drive to the north, and Mopac Expressway (SL 1) to the west.

Neighborhoods in Central Austin
Name	COA ID# (Note: City of Austin Planning Identification Number)
Bryker Woods	156
Caswell Heights	294
Downtown Austin	402
Eastwoods	25
Hancock	31
Heritage	33
Hyde Park	34
Judges' Hill	58
Lower Waller Creek	960
North University	48
Oakmont Heights	185
Old Enfield	185
Old Pecan Street	23
Old West Austin	18
Original Austin	57
Original West University	1020
Pemberton Heights	644
Ridgelea	63
Ridgetop	957
Rosedale	66
Shoal Crest	259
West Downtown	1253

== North Austin ==
North Austin is defined as a neighborhoods north of Central Austin (51st Street/North Loop/Hancock Drive).

=== North Central ===
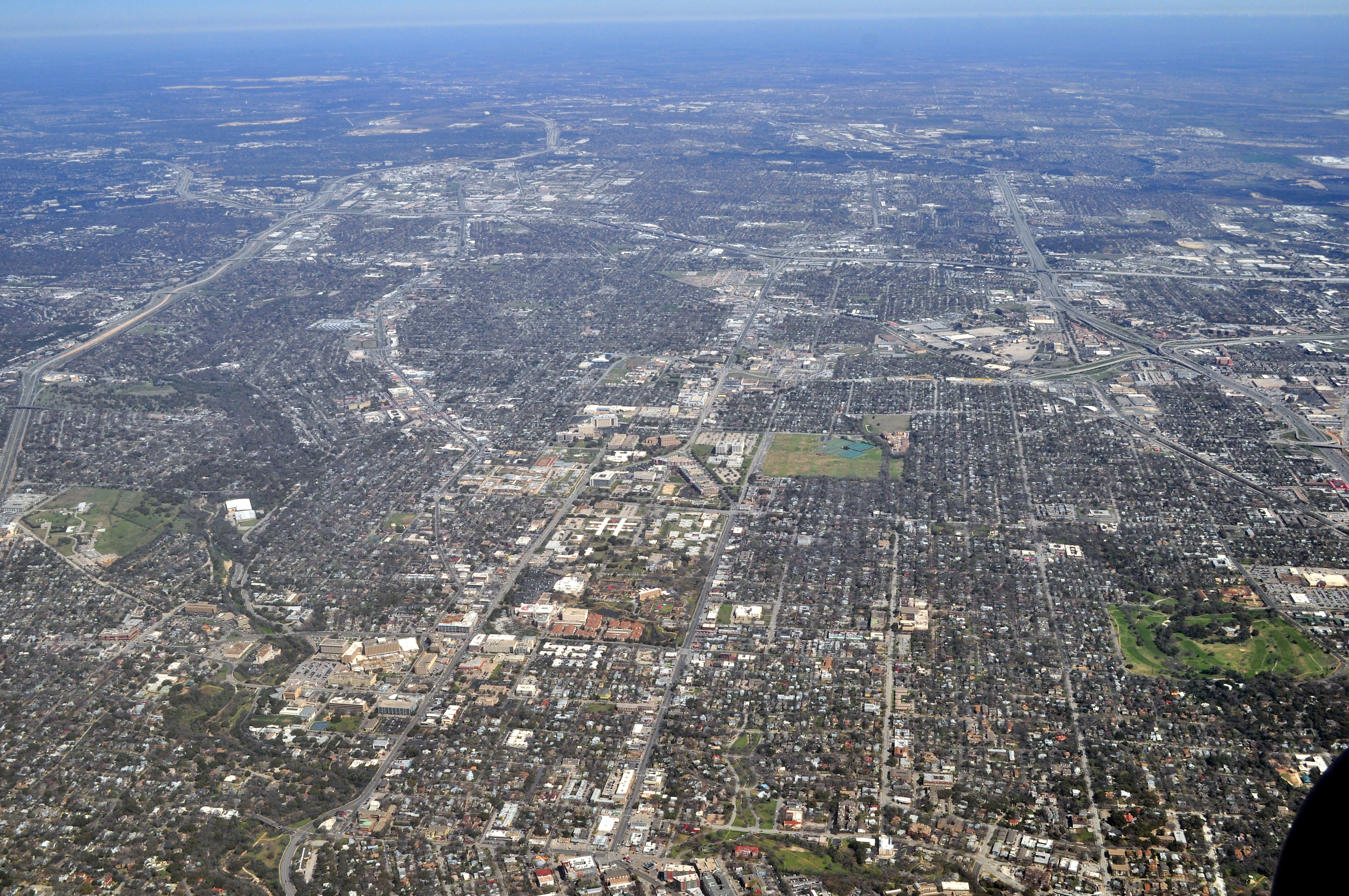
North central Austin

- Allandale
- Balcones Woods
- Barrington Oaks
- Battle Bend Springs
- Brentwood
- Crestview
- Estates of Brentwood
- Hancock
- Highland
- North Burnet
- North Campus
- North Lamar
- North Loop
- North Shoal Creek
- Saint John
- Wooten

=== Northeast ===
North of 51st Street, east of Interstate 35.

- Windsor Hills
- Windsor Park
- Springdale Heights
- Harris Branch
- University Hills

=== Northwest ===
North of Hancock Drive, west of Mopac Expressway.

- Canyon Creek
- Great Hills/Arboretum
- Northwest Hills
- Spicewood at Bull Creek
- Balcones Village
- Anderson Mill

=== Far North ===
North of Parmer Lane, and Williamson County portion

- Copperfield
- Wells Branch
- Scofield Farms
- Avery Ranch
- Robinson Ranch
- Jollyville

== East Austin ==
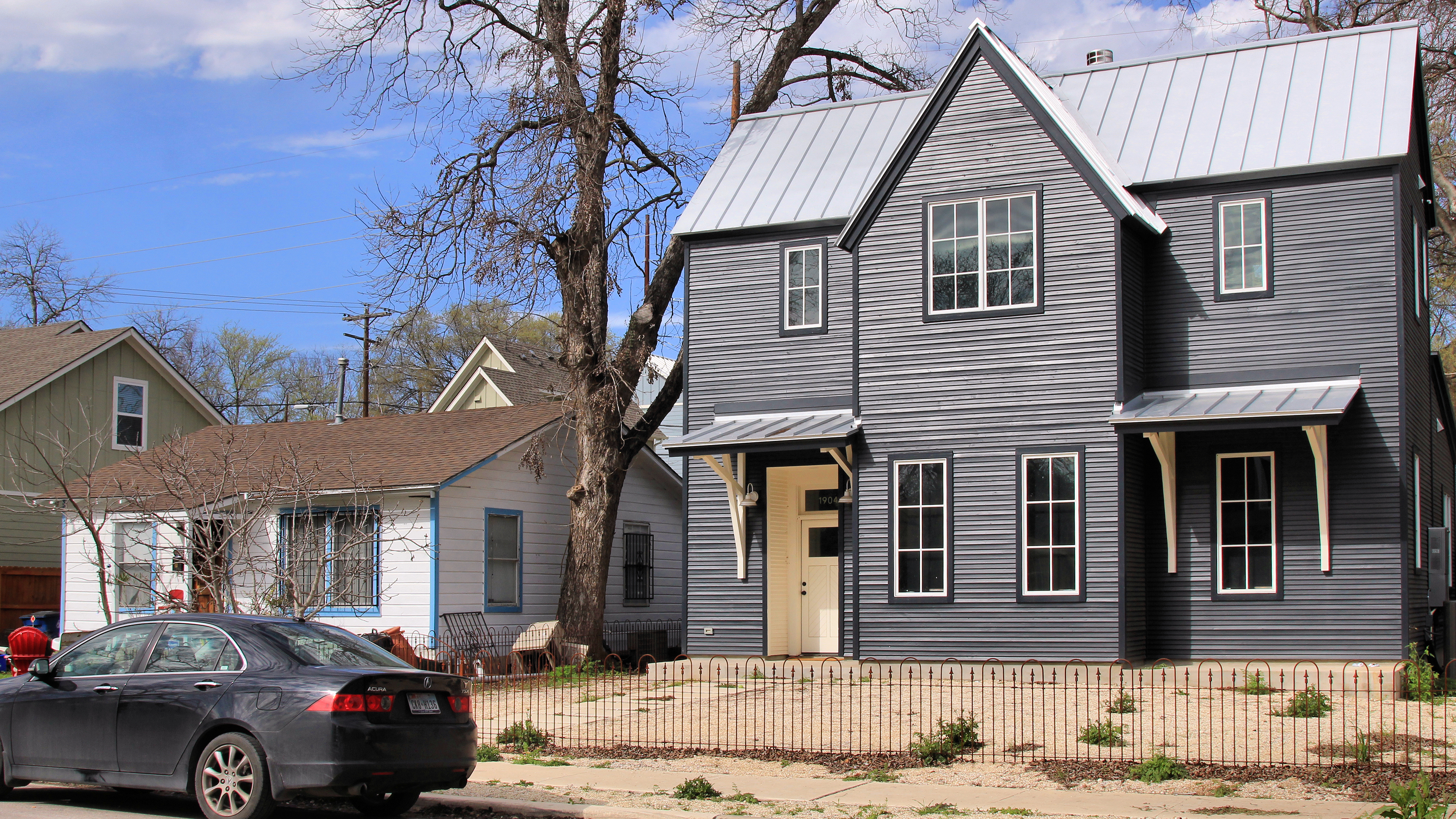
New home in Holly

East Austin is defined as areas east of I-35 north of the river.

- Blackshear-Prospect Hill
- Central East Austin
- Chestnut
- East Cesar Chavez
- East Congress
- East End
- Foster Heights
- French Place
- Govalle
- Guadalupe-Saldaña
- Holly
- Mueller
- Rosewood

== West Austin ==
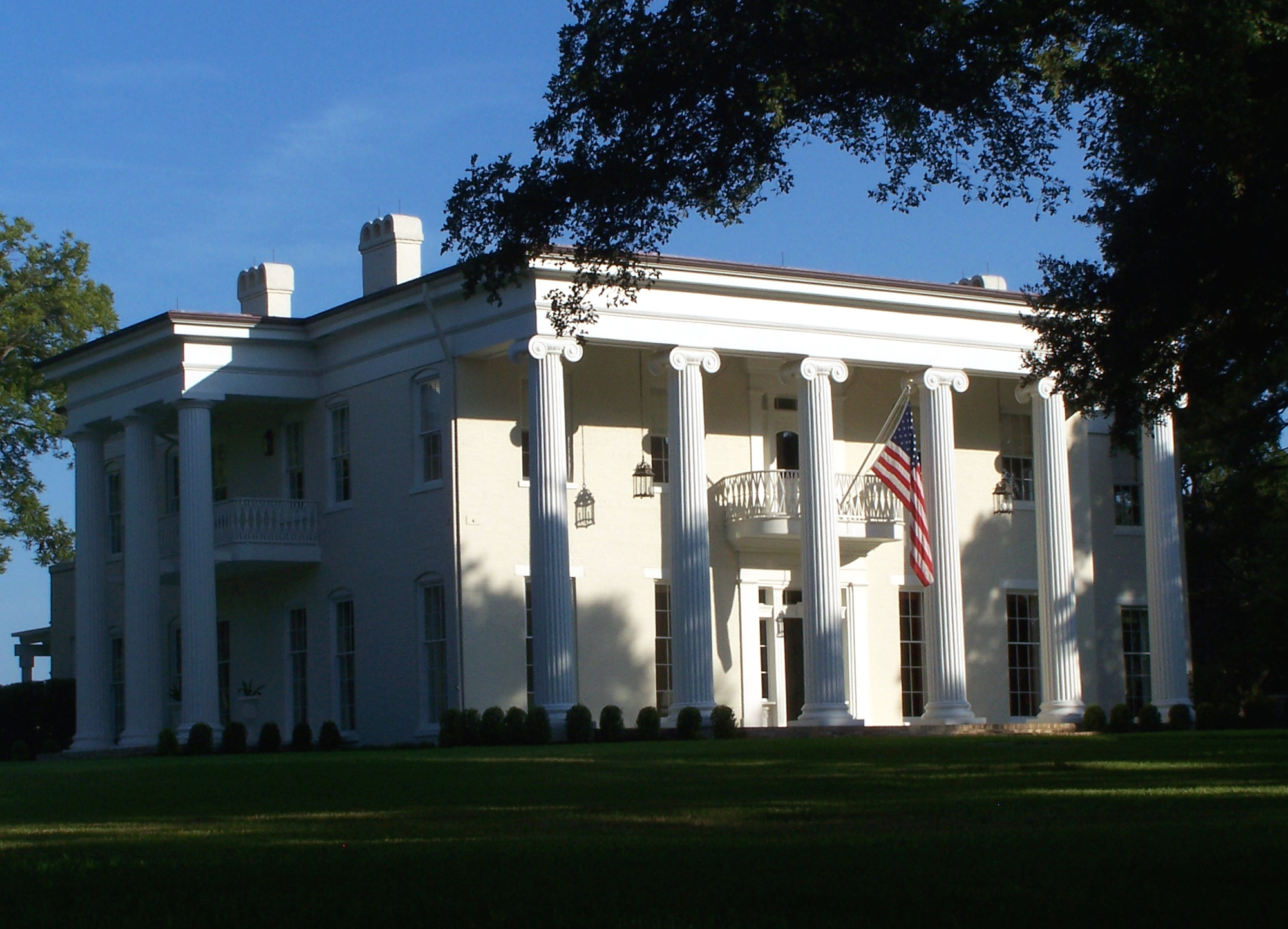
Woodlawn in West Austin

West Austin occupies a much smaller area due to the bend of the Colorado River. The area is bounded by Mopac Expressway (SL 1) to the east, the Colorado River to the south and west, and Northland Drive (RM 2222) to the north.

- Far West
- Tarrytown
- West Congress
- West End
- West Line Historic District

== South Austin ==
South Austin generally includes any area south of the Colorado River.

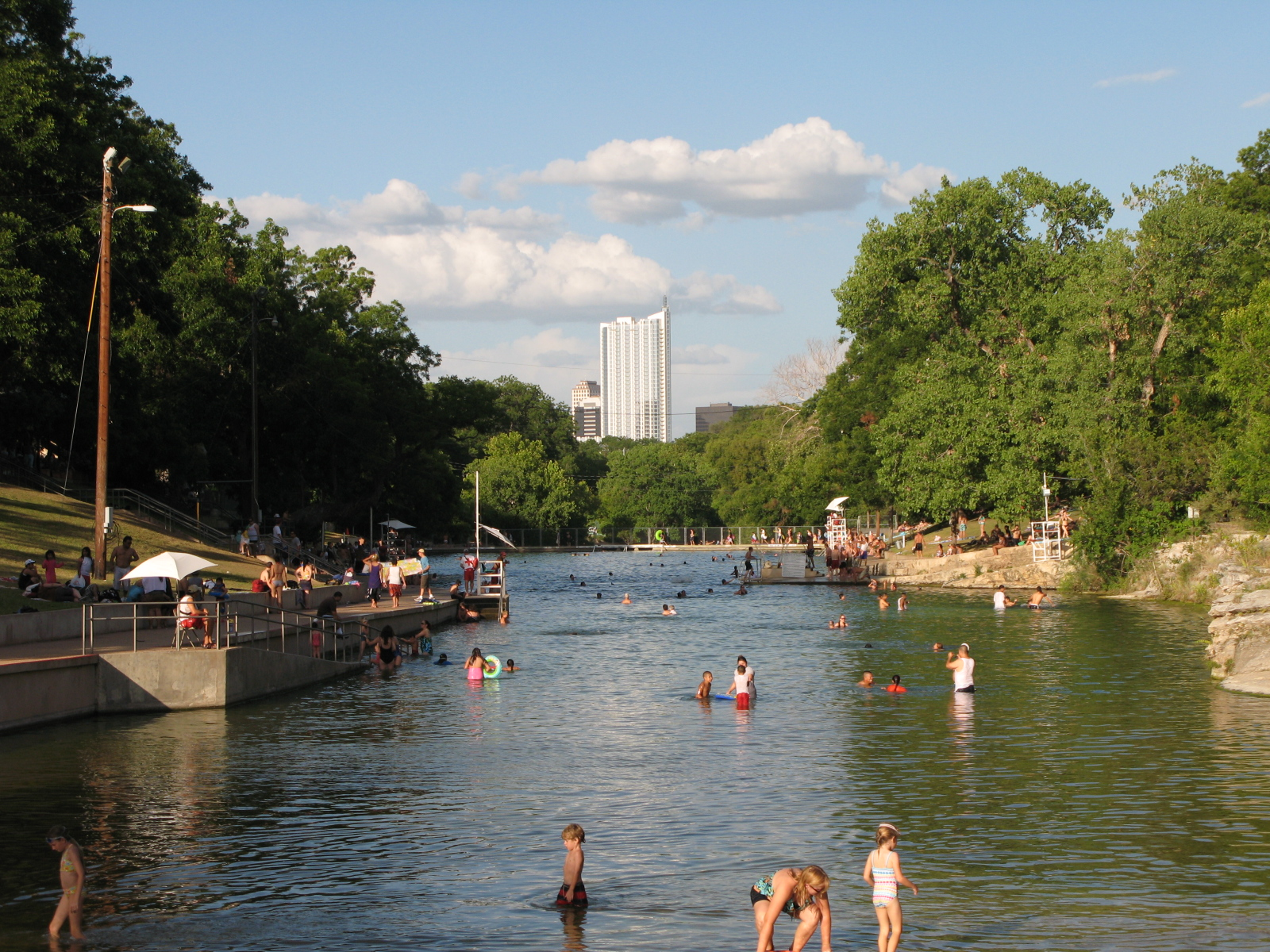
Barton Springs Pool in Zilker

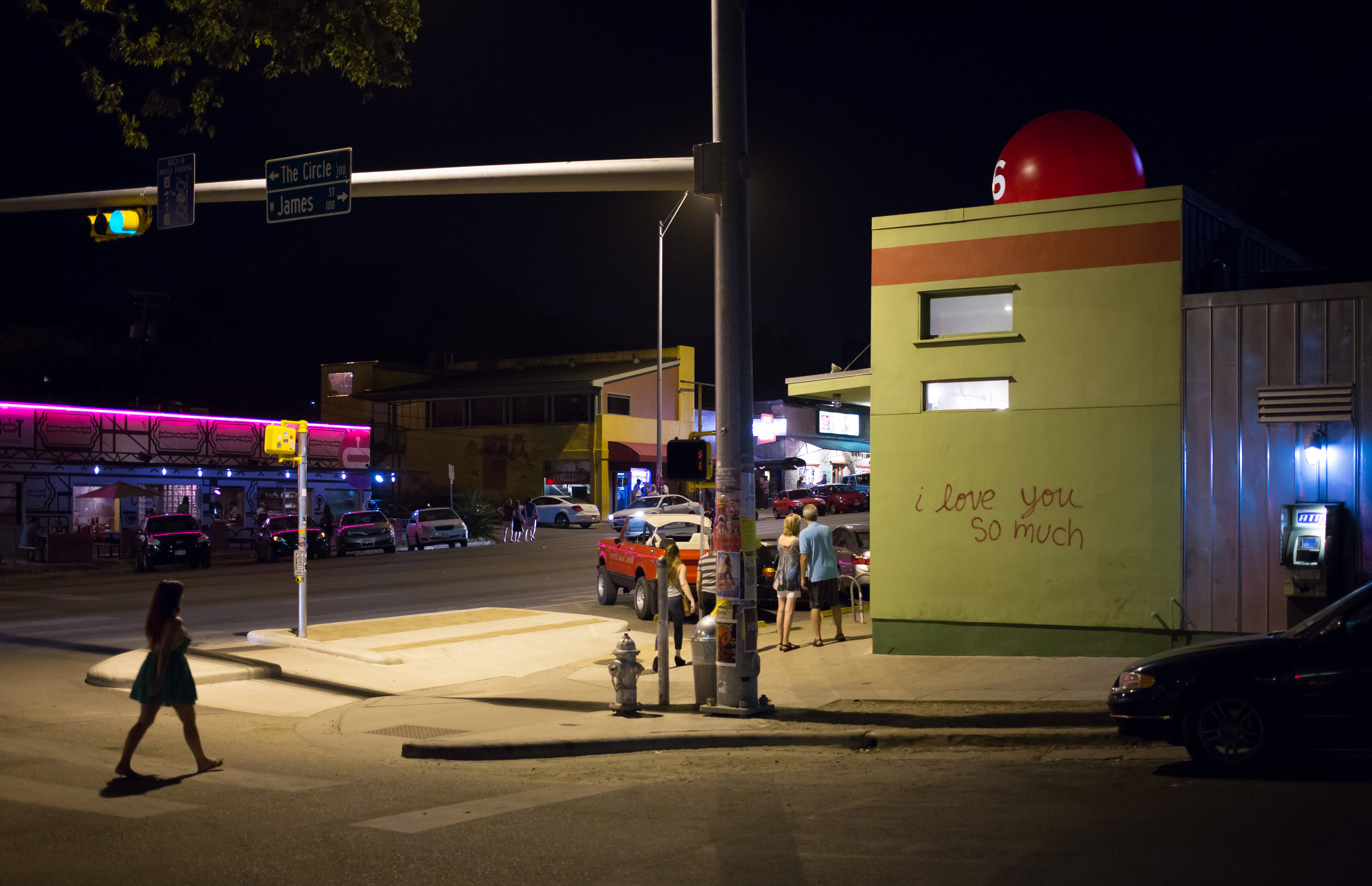
South Congress

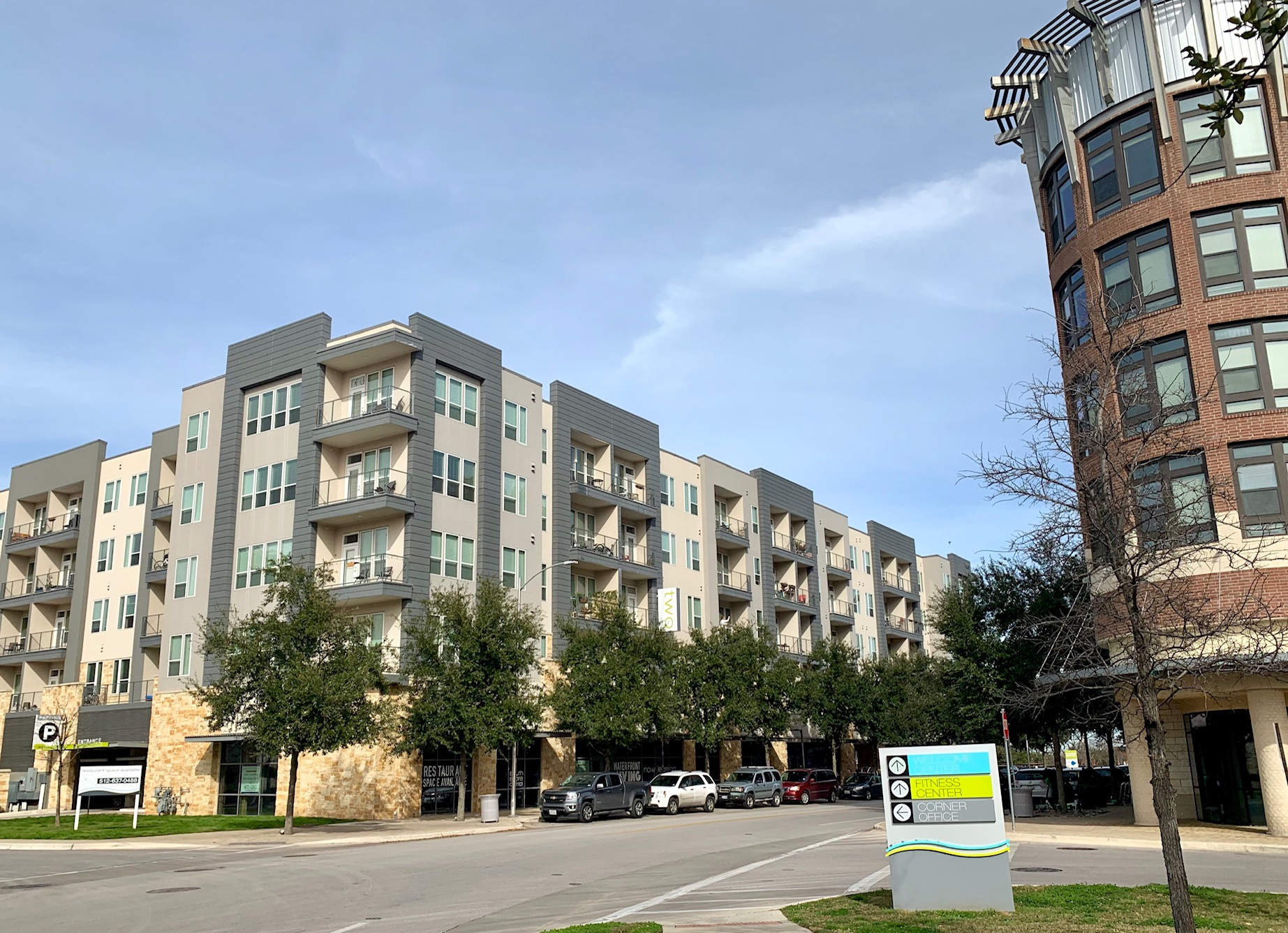
Apartments in East Riverside

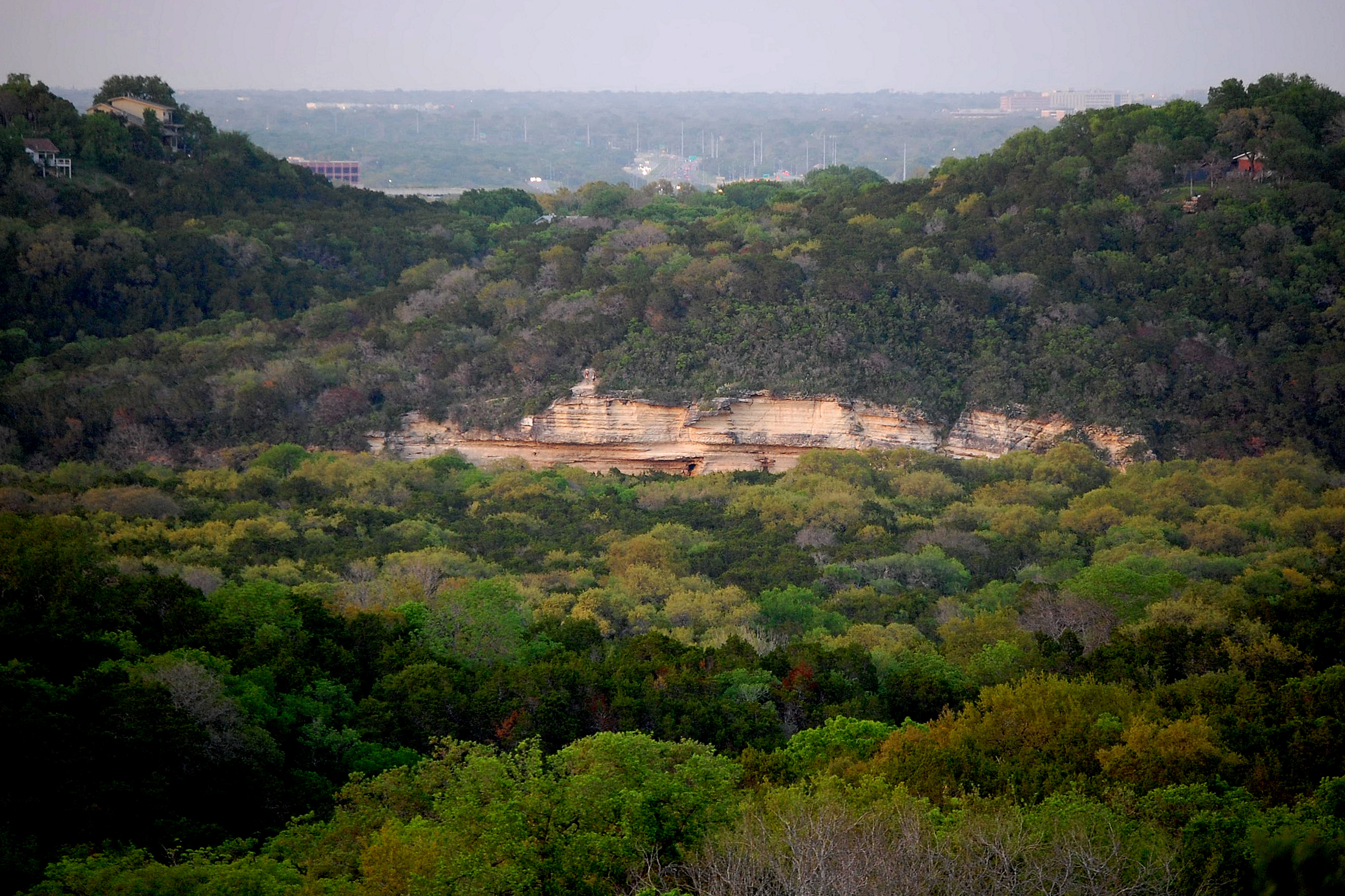
Barton Creek

Lady Bird Johnson Wildflower Center in Circle C

=== South Central ===
South Central Austin is boxed by Mopac Expressway to the west, the Colorado River to the north, Interstate 35 to the east, and Ben White Boulevard to the south.

- Barton Creek
- Barton Hills
- Bouldin Creek
- Dawson
- Galindo
- South Congress
- South Lamar
- South River City
- Spyglass-Barton's Bluffs
- Travis Heights
- Zilker

=== Southeast Central/Riverside ===
Southeastern Austin between the Colorado River and Ben White Boulevard is generally called the Riverside area.

- East Riverside-Oltorf
- Montopolis
- Pleasant Valley

=== Southeast ===
Neighborhoods east of Menchaca Road and south of Ben White Boulevard.

- Dove Springs
- Onion Creek
- South Manchaca
- Southeast Austin
- Southpark Meadows

=== Southwest ===
Neighborhoods west of Menchaca Road and south of Ben White Boulevard and Capital of Texas Highway.

- Cherry Creek
- Circle C Ranch
- Oak Hill
- Slaughter-Manchaca
- Kincheonville
- The Ridge at Lantana
- Maple Run
- Sendera
- Shady Hollow
- Sunset Valley (incorporated city)
- Tanglewood Forest
- Travis Country
- Westgate
- Woodstone Village
- Allandale
- Balcones Woods
- Barrington Oaks
- Battle Bend Springs
- Barton Creek
- Barton Hills
- Blackland
- Bouldin Creek
- Brentwood
- Bryker Woods
- Canyon Creek
- Cat Mountain
- Central East Austin
- Cherrywood
- Clarksville Historic District
- Copperfield
- Coronado Hills
- Crestview
- Dawson
- Dove Springs
- Delwood
- East Cesar Chavez
- East Congress
- East End
- East Riverside-Oltorf
- Estates of Brentwood
- Far South Austin/Slaughter-Manchaca
- Far West
- Franklin Park
- French Place
- Galindo
- Garrison Park
- Georgian Acres
- Govalle
- Gracy Woods
- Great Hills/Arboretum
- Hancock
- Harris Branch
- Heritage Hills
- Highland
- Holly
- Hyde Park Historic District
- Johnston Terrace
- Lamplight Village
- Laurel Oaks
- Montopolis
- The Mountain
- Mueller
- North Burnet
- North Campus
- North Lamar
- North Loop
- North Shoal Creek
- Northwest Hills
- Northwood
- Oak Hill
- Old West Austin Historic District
- Onion Creek
- Oriens Park
- Pecan Springs-Springdale
- Pemberton Heights
- Pleasant Valley
- The Ridge at Lantana
- River Oaks
- Rosedale
- Rosewood
- Saint John
- Scofield
- Scofield Farms and Ridge
- Seabrook
- Shadow Lawn Historic District
- Shady Hollow
- Sixth Street Historic District
- Skyview
- South Congress
- South Lamar
- South Manchaca
- South River City
- Southeast Austin
- Spyglass-Barton's Bluffs
- Steiner Ranch
- Swedish Hill Historic District
- Sweetbriar
- Tarrytown
- Travis Country
- University Hills
- Wells Branch
- West Campus
- West Congress
- West End
- West Line Historic District
- Westgate
- Wilshire Wood
- Windsor Hills
- Windsor Park
- Wooten
- Zilker
