= Copperfield =

Copperfield may refer to:

== Places ==
=== Australia ===
- Copperfield, Queensland, a pair of former copper mining towns, now within the locality of Clermont
  - North Copperfield, Queensland, the northern town of Copperfield
  - South Copperfield, Queensland, the southern town of Copperfield
- Copperfield College, a school in Melbourne, Victoria

=== Canada ===
- Copperfield, Calgary, neighbourhood in Calgary, Alberta, Canada
- Copperfield's Mine, mine on Temagami Island, Ontario, Canada

=== United States ===
- Copperfield, Oregon, community in Oregon, United States
- Copperfield, Texas, neighborhood in Harris County, Texas, United States
- Copperfield, Austin, Texas, a neighbourhood in Austin, Texas
- Copperfield, Illinois, a neighborhood in Dunlap

== People ==
- David Copperfield (disambiguation)
- Copperfield, a fictional character in the video game The Suffering: Ties That Bind

== Entertainment ==
- Copperfield (musical), a musical based on Charles Dickens' book David Copperfield
