= St David's Hospital =

St David's Hospital may refer to:

- St David's Hospital, Cardiff, in Cardiff, Wales, UK
- St David's Hospital, Carmarthen, in Carmarthen, Wales, a former mental health hospital
- Dewi Sant Hospital, a small hospital in Pontypridd, Wales, UK
- St David's Hospital, Hancock, Austin, Texas, USA
