= Galindo, Austin, Texas =

Neighborhood in Texas, United States

Coordinates: 30°14′08″N 97°46′07″W

Neighborhood map

Galindo is a neighborhood in Austin, Texas. The area covers part of ZIP code 78704 in south Austin.

Galindo is bounded to the south by Ben White Boulevard and the South Manchaca neighborhood, to the east by Dawson and South First Street, to the north by Oltorf Road and Bouldin Creek and to the west by the South Lamar neighborhood.

Galindo maintains a primarily residential character, with most homes built in the 1950s and 1960s in either the ranch or bungalow style, though there is some new construction. The neighborhood anchor is the 11-acre South Austin Park and Recreation Center, located in the neighborhood's northwest section. Constructed in 1974, the park includes the South Austin Tennis Center, the only city-owned tennis center south of Colorado River.

== Demographics ==
According to data from the U.S. Census Bureau, the population of the area defined as Galindo was 3,898 as of 2009, distributed over an area of 0.788 square miles. The population density per square mile is 4,949, nearly double the citywide average of 2,610. The racial breakdown of the area is 55% Hispanic/Latino, 35% white only, 7% black only and 3% other. Galindo's median household income in 2009 was $37,801, compared to the citywide average of $50,132.

== Education ==
Galindo is served by the Austin Independent School District:

- Galindo Elementary School or Dawson Elementary School
- Fulmore Middle School
- Travis High School
