= Barton Hills =

Barton Hills could refer to:

- Barton Hills, Bedfordshire, England in the Chilterns near Barton-le-Clay (including a National Nature Reserve)
- Barton Hills, Michigan, United States
- Barton Hills, Austin, Texas, a neighborhood in Austin, Texas

== See also ==
- Barton Hill (disambiguation)
