= Westgate, Austin, Texas =

Neighborhood of Austin, Texas

Coordinates: 30°13′29″N 97°48′01″W

Central Market is a major retailer in the Westgate neighborhood.

Neighborhood boundaries

Westgate is a neighborhood in Austin, Texas, located southwest of the city's urban core. It includes ZIP code 78745.

Westgate's boundaries are Ben White Boulevard and the South Lamar and Barton Hills neighborhood to the north, Manchaca Road and the South Manchaca neighborhood on the east, Stassney Lane and the Garrison Park on the south and West Gate Boulevard and the city of Sunset Valley the west.

From the period from the mid-1950s to the late 1960s, Westgate's development was largely residential and the area contains many single-family homes. However, by the late 1990s the Westgate Shopping Center at the intersection of Ben White Boulevard, Lamar Boulevard, and the Capital of Texas Highway was built.

== Demographics ==
According to data from the U.S. Census Bureau, the population of the area defined as Westgate was 4,590 as of 2009. Covering an area of 1.468 square miles, the population density per square mile is 3,127, slightly above the citywide average of 2,610. The racial breakdown of the area is approximately 55% white alone, 35% Hispanic/Latino, 5% black and 5% other. Median household income in 2009 was $46,312, slightly below the citywide average of $50,132.

== Education ==
Westgate is served by the Austin Independent School District:

- Sunset Valley Elementary School or Joslin Elementary School
- Covington Middle School
- Crockett High School
