= South Lamar, Austin, Texas =

Coordinates: 30°20′24″N 97°43′51″W

South Lamar SoLa
- Neighborhood
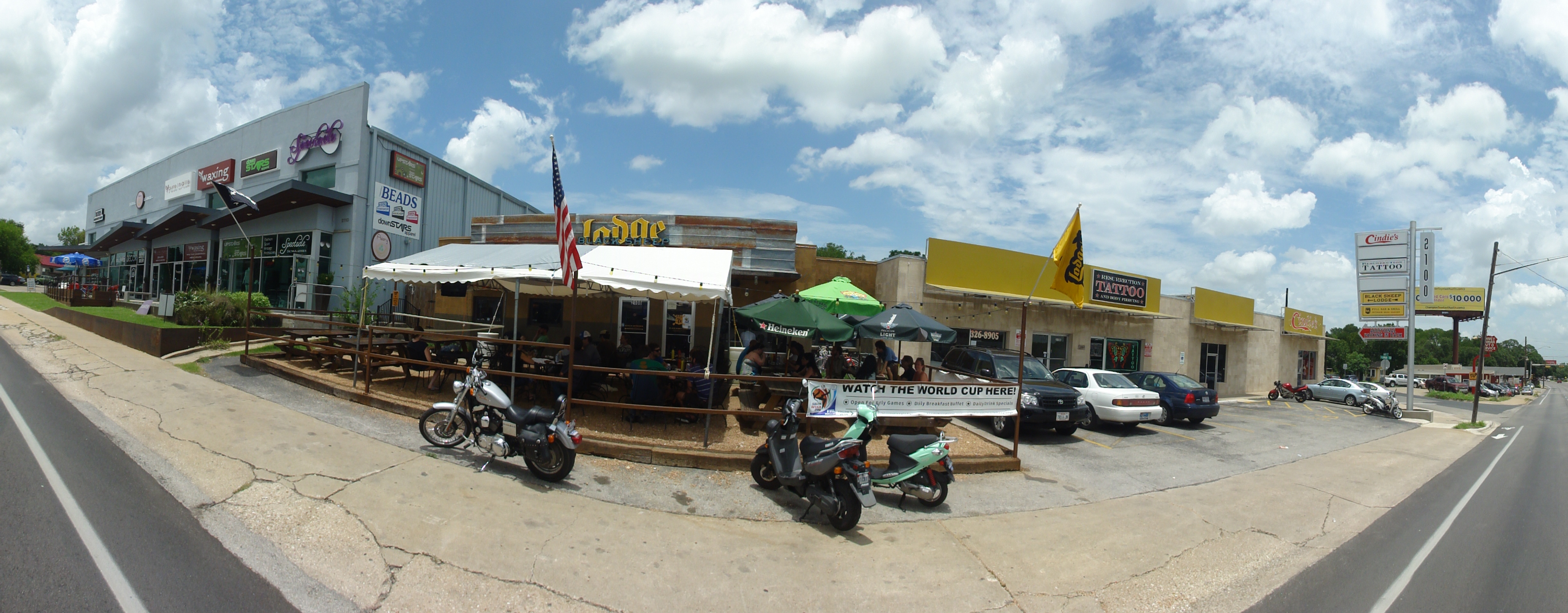
- Businesses along S. Lamar Boulevard
- Neighborhood Boundaries
- Country: United States
- State: Texas
- City: Austin
- Time zone: UTC-6 (CST)
  - Summer (DST): UTC-5 (CDT)
- ZIP Codes: 78704
- Area codes: 512, 737

South Lamar, Austin, Texas is a neighborhood in south Austin, Texas, United States.

South Lamar is bounded by Ben White Boulevard/TX-71 and Westgate to the south, South Lamar Boulevard and Barton Hills and Galindo to the east.

Homes in South Austin have single family homes, apartment complexes, multi-family homes and condo complexes. Most of the multi-family residences are duplexes that were built in the 1980s. Because of this high concentration of duplexes, renters make up over 70% of the community making this a hotbed for investors.

The Broken Spoke, a dance hall, was founded in 1964 by co-owner William Richard "Joe" Baland, still features live music Tuesday to Saturday nights. Co-owner James White had a reputation for booking local acts and "outlaw" bands that had gained notoriety by rebelling against the mainstream Nashville sound. Leading this brigade were Kris Kristofferson and Willie Nelson. Such Texas favorites as The Chicks and George Strait also played the Broken Spoke when they were just starting out.

South Lamar is located within city council District 5.

== Demographics ==
According to data from the U.S. Census Bureau, the population of South Lamar was 8,821 as of 2009. Population density per square mile is 6,253, triple figure for Austin at large. Approximately 55% white, 35% Hispanic, 5% black, 2% Asian. Median household income is $39,319, and average estimated value of detached houses in 2009 was $213,391.

== Education ==
South Lamar is served by the Austin Independent School District:

- Zilker Elementary School
- O. Henry Middle School
- Austin High School

== Public transportation ==
CapMetro CapMetro Rapid Route 803 traverses South Congress Avenue providing express service to the rest of the city. Specifically, the route has stops at Barton Springs, Lamar Square, Oltorf West, Bluebonnet, Broken Spoke, and Brodie Oaks stations. Westgate Transit Center (the terminus of Route 803) at Ben White Boulevard also provides connection to other bus routes in the area.
