= Spyglass-Barton's Bluff, Austin, Texas =

Neighborhood of Austin, Texas

Coordinates: 30°15′29″N 97°47′22″W

Spyglass-Barton's Bluff is a neighborhood in Austin, Texas. It is located southwest of the city's urban core, and encompasses ZIP codes 78746 and 78704.

Neighborhood boundaries

Sometimes known as Barton's Bluff-Spyglass, the neighborhood is a narrow strip of land that runs between Mopac Expressway and Barton Creek in northwest Austin. The neighborhood is bounded to the south by the Capital of Texas Highway, the Barton Hills neighborhood and the Barton Creek Greenbelt to the east and the Zilker neighborhood to the north. Across MoPac lie the Barton Creek Square Mall and the Austin suburb of Rollingwood.

Most structures in the area were built in the 1990s. Although Spyglass-Barton's Bluff is home to offices and single-family homes, it also contains one of the largest concentrations of apartments, town homes and condominiums in the city.

Spyglass-Barton's Bluff is located within city council District 8.

== Demographics ==
According to data from the U.S. Census Bureau, the population of the area defined as Spyglass-Barton's Bluff was 1,967 in 2009, across an area of 0.909 square miles. The population density per square miles is 2,165, below the citywide average of 2,610. The racial breakdown is 75% white, 12% Hispanic/Latino, 10% Asian/Pacific Islander and 3% other. Spyglass-Barton's Bluff is statistically younger than the rest of the city, with the median age for males 20.5 and that of females 18.9; the median age of males and females in the entire city is 29.6 and 30.2, respectively. Median household income in 2009 was $47,625, just below the citywide average of $50,132.

== Education ==
Spyglass-Barton's Bluff is served by the Eanes Independent School District:

- Cedar Creek Elementary School
- Hill Country Middle School
- Westlake High School
