= Barton Hill =

Barton Hill may refer to:

- Barton Hill, Bristol, England
- Barton Hill, North Yorkshire, England
- Barton Hill, Thiruvananthapuram, Kerala, India
  - Government Engineering College, Barton Hill

== See also ==
- Barton Hills (disambiguation)
