= South River City, Austin, Texas =

Neighborhood of Austin, Texas

Coordinates: 30°15′29″N 97°46′52″W

Neighborhood boundaries

South River City is a community located in Austin, Texas. Also frequently called Travis Heights, the neighborhood is located south of the city's urban core, just below Lake Lady Bird in South Austin. The area encompasses a portion of ZIP code 78704.

South River City is bounded to the west by South Congress Avenue and the Bouldin Creek neighborhood, to the south by Oltorf Road and to the east by Interstate 35 and East Riverside-Oltorf Combined Neighborhood Planning Area. To the north, South River City abuts Lake Lady Bird and Riverside Drive. South River City together with the St. Edward's neighborhood located directly to the south, comprise a City of Austin Combined Planning Area called Greater South River City.

The area known as South River City developed in the late 19th and early 20th century as Austin's first planned urban communities south of the Colorado River. Swisher's Addition and Fairview Park, the first two attempts at settlement in present-day South River City were troubled by the lack of transportation with Downtown Austin. However, the concrete Congress Avenue Bridge was completed in 1910, thus laying the groundwork for a neighborhood boom in the 1920s and 1930s. Many of the homes built were single-family, and some of those that remain are Victorian-era structures with gingerbread trim, Craftsman-influenced bungalows, and housed influenced by the Prairie School style. Many houses have gabled or hipped roofs and deep porches.

The portion of South River City north of Oltorf Street is located within city council District 9. The portion south of Oltorf Street is located within District 3.

== History ==
=== The Swisher Addition and birth of South Congress ===
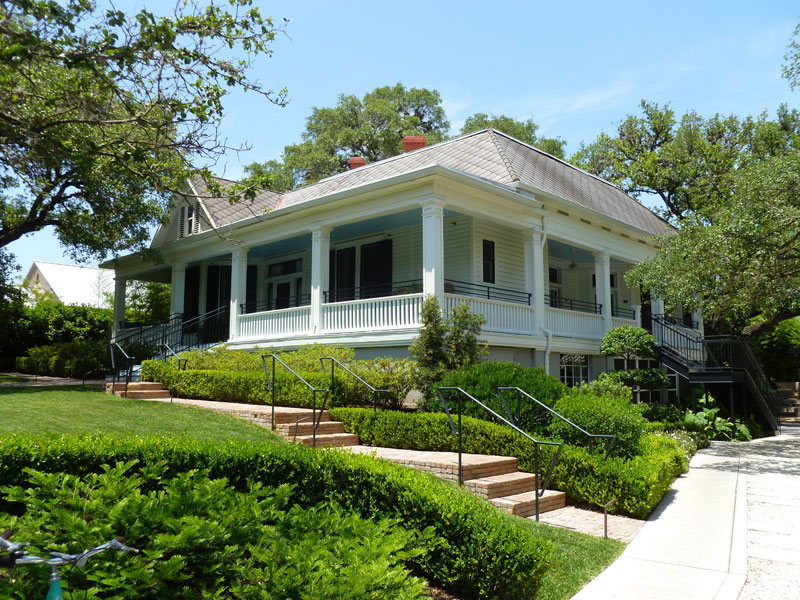
Bungalow in Travis Heights.

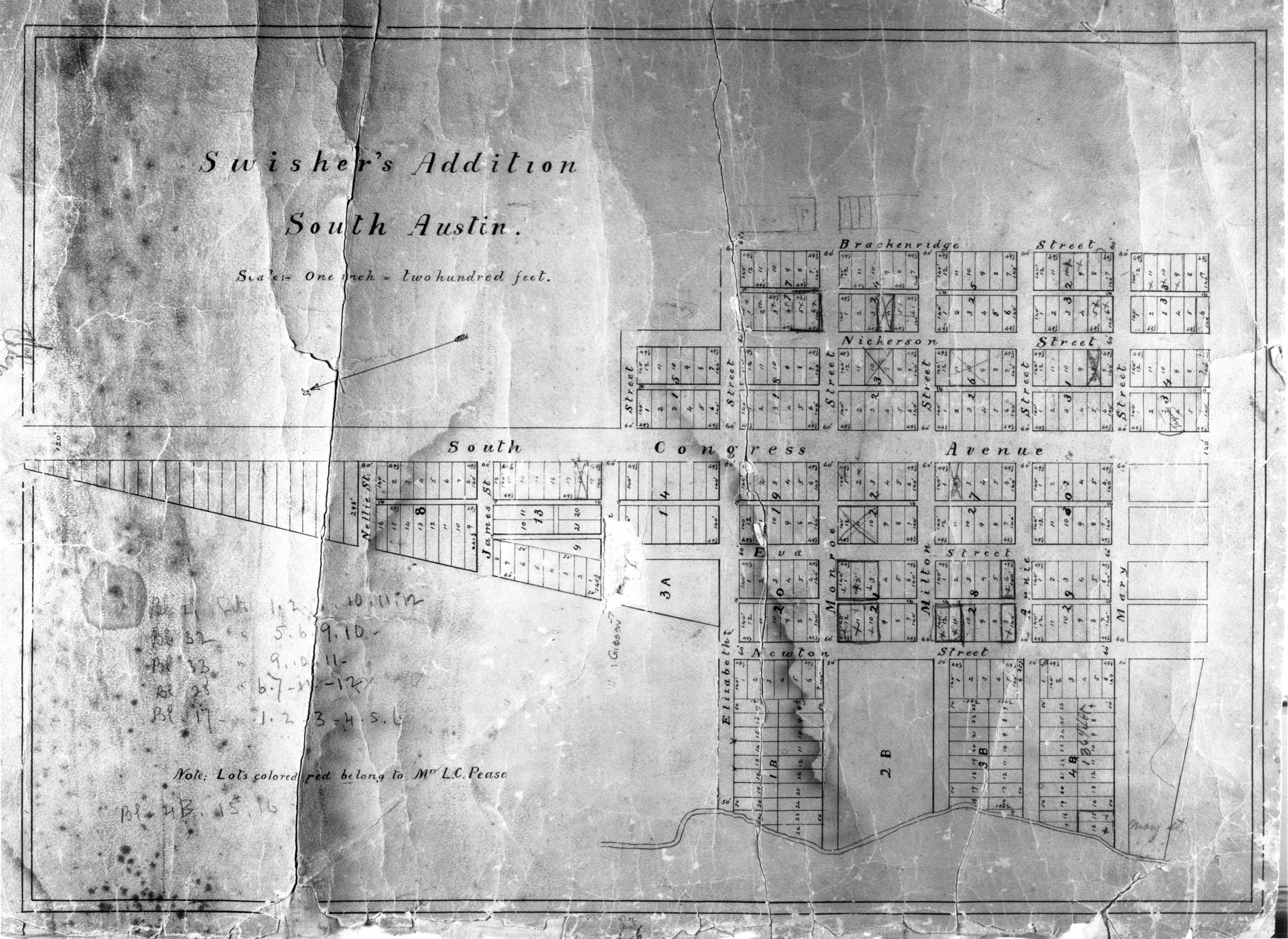
Map of Swisher's Addition

As was the case with other South Austin neighborhoods, the area around present-day South River City was slower to develop. Prior to the late 19th century, transportation to and from Downtown Austin was dependent on ferries and pontoon bridges.

James Swisher settled on a bluff in present-day South Austin with his family in 1846, and initially operated a tavern and a hotel. It was Swisher who granted Travis County the right-of-way to begin construction of a highway to San Antonio in 1852. Sensing the commercial opportunities that the new highway would bring, Swisher also began operating a ferry service across the Colorado River that same year. The establishment of Swisher's ferry and the Post Road in the early 1850s encouraged modest settlement in South Austin, particularly along the road, such as the Texas School for the Deaf in 1856. Further growth was halted by the outbreak of the U.S. Civil War and Reconstruction. Until a wooden bridge was finally built in 1876, South Austinites were dependent on ferry service and pontoon bridges to get to and from Downtown Austin. The bridge made South Austin more accessible than ever before, and in 1877 John Milton Swisher (James' son) subdivided 23 acres of the family farm along the San Antonio Road. It was to become Austin's first urban addition south of the Colorado River.

Platted in 1877, it was noted as an addition to "South Austin" rather than Austin, perhaps acknowledging South Austin's separate identity from the capital city. Swisher allotted a very generous 120 foot right-of-way through the center of his grid-style residential addition. The wide avenue was laid out in a direct line with Congress Avenue on the north side of the river. This visionary and civic act dedicated a grand view from Swisher's farm to the public domain. South Congress Avenue, in spite of being separated from the downtown portion of the street by about a mile over the Colorado River and low-lying areas, preserved the major approach to the Capitol and city center for future residents and visitors. A permanent and fully paved connection from Bouldin Creek to the north side of the river would not be complete for another 50 years. Streets were named Monroe, James, Annie, Nellie, Elizabeth, Mary, Johanna, Eva, Newton and Brackenridge. These names have survived to the present.

Swisher's Addition was not immediately successful. The wooden bridge collapsed in 1883, and while an iron bridge was built later that same decade, the concrete Congress Avenue Bridge and streetcar lines did not extend to South Austin until about 1910. Because this impeded would-be residents from being able to commute to downtown jobs with ease, development was slow and South Congress Avenue remained a country road through a largely rural landscape throughout the remainder of 19th century.

=== Fairview Park ===
Despite Swisher's minimal success, other developers tried their luck in South Austin. In 1886 Charles Newning bought the northern portion of the Swisher farm with plans of developing an "upscale, owner-occupied, garden suburb." In contrast to Swisher's grid-style addition on the high, relatively flat ground of the area, Newning's development was created over a hilly area with two creeks through it and numerous city views from its hillsides and terraces. Newning's vision became Fairview Park – named because this area offered a "fair view" of the city from the bluffs.

Mr. Newning's ideal development was never realized in large part because he did not anticipate the extent to which commercial development would occur on South Congress, the difficulty of crossing the river, and the distance from town. Before the turn of the century a number of Victorian homes were built on the large lots. Development, however, was so sparse that starting in the 1910s lots were subdivided into smaller parcels. In the 1920s and 1930s, small bungalows and cottages were built on these smaller lots. A much altered and scaled-back Fairview Park was not built out until the 1940s.

=== Travis Heights ===
Following the completion of the concrete Congress Avenue Bridge in 1910, pedestrians, automobiles and Austin's streetcar system were able to reach South River City with ease and the area began to grow. In 1913, General William Harwood Stacy, Charles Newning's partner, and Stacy's sons began development of Travis Heights. Travis Heights was the most heavily promoted subdivision of its time. Stacy ran streetcars full of prospective buyers out to Travis Heights from the Capitol to see the area before the homes were even built and gave away Ford Touring cars as part of a promotional campaign. He also incorporated deed restrictions against multi-family and commercial development in his subdivision to reassure buyers that Travis Heights would remain a residential enclave.

Based on his earlier experience with Charles Newning and Fairview Park, General Stacy laid out his South River City subdivision with both curving and grid streets and provided lot sizes and prices to fit a range of customers, from the builders of modest bungalows to grand home sites with commanding vistas. Travis Heights was an immediate success and a great surge of home building took place in the 1920s, so that by the General's death in 1928, 600 lots had been sold and more than 160 homes built.

== Demographics ==
According to data from the U.S. Census Bureau, the population of the area defined as South River City was 6,357 in 2009, across an area of 1.307 square miles. The population density per square miles is 4,862 people per square mile and is, as a result, notably higher than the citywide average for Austin (2,610 people per square miles). The racial breakdown is 73% white, 24% Hispanic/Latino, 2% black and 15 other. The median ages of males and females in the neighborhood are 31.3 and 34.6, slightly above the citywide median ages of 29.6 and 30.2, respectively. Median household income in 2009 in South River City was $41,179, compared with $50,132 for Austin at large. In 2009, the average estimated value of detached houses in the area was $387,271 (39.0% of all units), compared with $$286,025 for the rest of the city.

== Recreation ==
Perhaps the greatest contribution Stacy made to the future livability of not only Travis Heights, but the entire South River City Neighborhood, was the dedication of land adjacent to Blunn Creek and the bluff which drops down to Lake Lady Bird as public parks. Stacy's sons, Harwood and Gillespie, added more and along Blunn Creek. This parkland later became known as Stacy Park. While Stacy Park was intended as a major recreational area, it also served as a natural divider between Travis Heights and the Fairview Park and Swisher subdivisions.

== Education ==
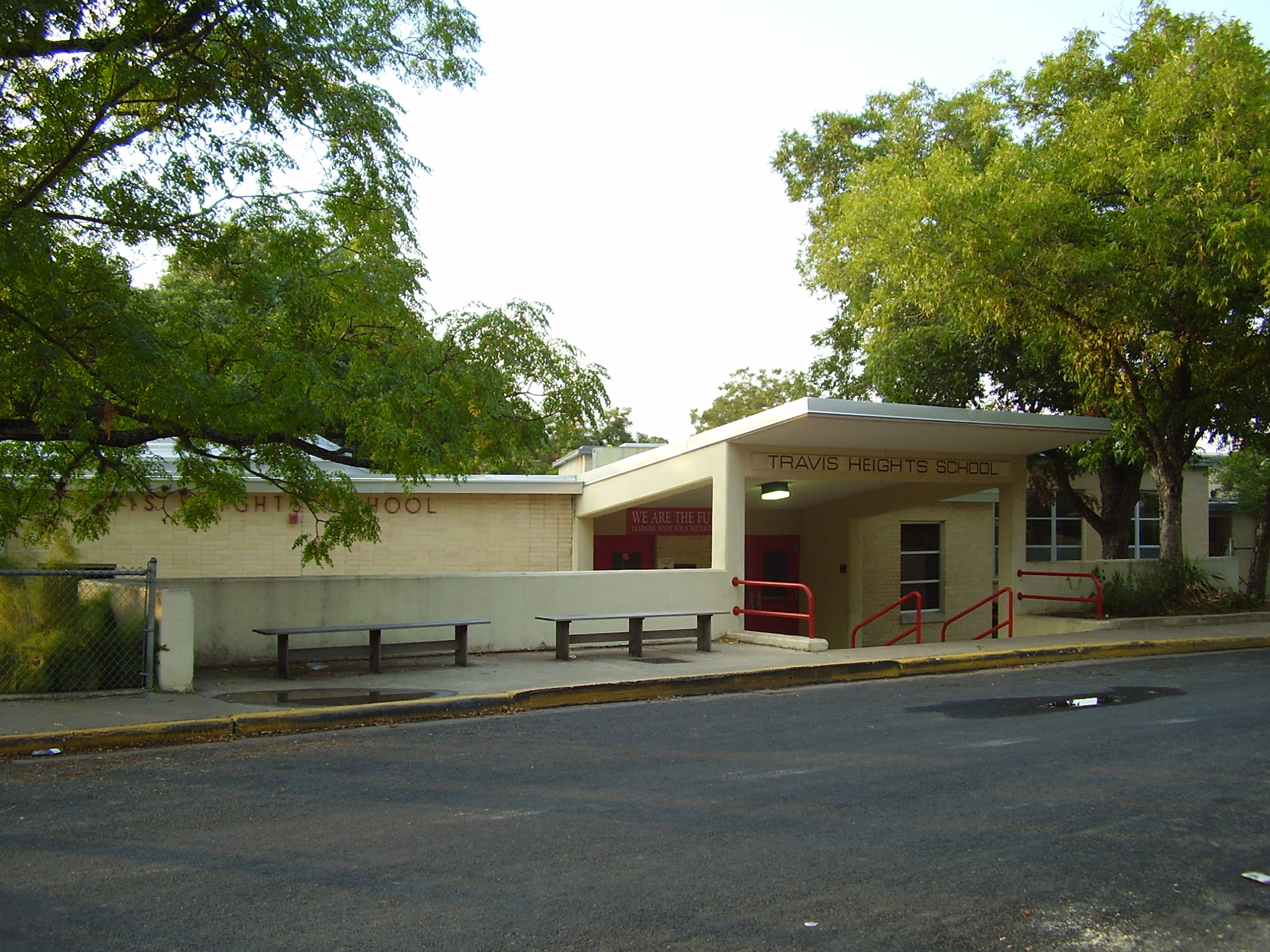
Travis Heights Elementary School

The neighborhood is zoned to the Austin Independent School District.

- Travis Heights Elementary School
- Lively Middle School
- Travis High School
