= North Burnet–Gateway, Austin, Texas =

Neighborhood of Austin, Texas

Coordinates: 30.393°N 97.721°W

North Burnet-Gateway
- Neighborhood
- Neighborhood Boundaries
- Country: United States
- State: Texas
- City: Austin
- Time zone: UTC-6 (CST)
  - Summer (DST): UTC-5 (CDT)
- ZIP Codes: 78758, 78759
- Area codes: 512, 737

North Burnet–Gateway (NBG) is a 2,300 acre neighborhood in northwest Austin, Texas bordered by Walnut Creek to the north, US 183 to the south and southwest, Metric Boulevard to the east, Braker Lane to the northwest, and MoPac (Loop 1) to the west.

North Burnet-Gateway is mostly located within City Council District 7, with a small portion located within District 6.

== History ==
In 2006, the City of Austin established the North Burnet/Gateway 2035 Master Plan. It adopted the North Burnet/Gateway Neighborhood Plan on November 1, 2007, and the North Burnet/Gateway Regulating Plan in 2009.

== Education ==
=== Public primary and secondary education ===
North Burnet-Gateway is served by the Austin Independent School District. Students in the neighborhood are zoned for one of three elementary schools (Pillow Elementary School, Summit Elementary School, or Davis Elementary School), one of two middle schools (Burnet Middle School or Murchison Middle School) and Anderson High School.

=== Higher education ===
The Austin Community College Northridge Campus is located in North Burnet-Gateway, as is the University of Texas at Austin J. J. Pickle Research Campus.

== Economy ==
The Domain, a commercial and residential complex sometimes referred to Austin's "second downtown", is located in North Burnet-Gateway.

== Recreation ==
The North Burnet-Gateway neighborhood is bordered to the north by the Walnut Creek greenbelt.

== Sports ==
North Burnet-Gateway is the site of Q2 Stadium, home to Austin FC soccer club.

== See also ==
- List of Austin neighborhoods
