= Windsor Park, Austin, Texas =

Neighborhood of Austin, Texas

Coordinates: 30.31406°N 97.69009°W

Neighborhood boundaries

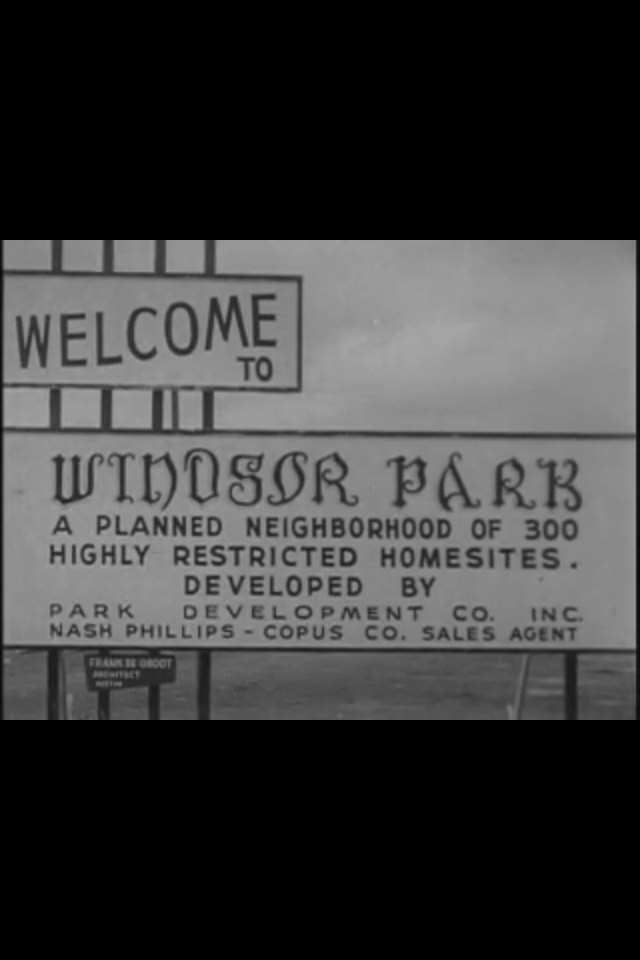
1950s first neighborhood home company sign.

The Windsor Park neighborhood is located in Austin, Texas, and bounded on the south by 51st St. to Tilley St., southwest to Philomena St., southeast along the Central Texas Emergency Command Center and Troublemaker Studios property line to Zach Scott St., east to Manor Rd., northeast to Northeast Dr., northwest/north to US Highway 290, east to IH35, then south to E 51st St.
