= Dawson Elementary School =

Elementary school in Austin, Texas, U.S.

Coordinates: 30.23415°N 97.76353°W

- Austin, Texas; United States

Information
- Established: 1954; 72 years ago
- Language: English; Spanish

Dawson Elementary School is an elementary school in the Austin Independent School District (AISD) currently serving students in pre-kindergarten through fifth grade. The school is located at 3001 South First Street in South Austin, Texas, and is named after Mary Jane "Mollie" Dawson, a teacher and school administrator who worked in Austin in the late nineteenth century.

== History ==
=== Early history ===
In the early 1950s, multiple factors, including the baby boom, propelled demand for public schools. The Austin School Board invested significant public funds (estimated in 1952 at $8,838,400.74) in the construction of several new public schools, including Mollie Dawson Elementary School, Brentwood Elementary School, Maplewood Elementary School, Highland Park West Elementary School, Florence Ralston Brooks Elementary Schools, William B. Travis High School, McCallum High School, Anderson High School, and O. Henry Junior High School.

An architectural sketch of Dawson Elementary by Fehr and Granger appeared in the local newspaper in 1952. The sketch planned for 16 classrooms, a school cafeteria, administration offices, and playrooms. However, demand required putting the school into use before construction could be completed. Dawson Elementary first opened in 1954 with an eight-room unit on a nine-acre site. Construction continued into 1956, with four additional rooms completed that fall. When the school board held its official dedication ceremony in January 1957, the building included classrooms, offices, a library, a "cafetorium," and a "visual education room." A 1957 newspaper article stated that the complete cost of construction was $281,176.92.

Neighboring Dawson and Joslin Elementary Schools shared a similar origin story and held their official dedication ceremonies on the same day. According to The Austin Statesman, Mrs. Paul Wagoner played a significant role in the creation of Dawson Elementary. As a substitute teacher and mother of a student at the St. Elmo School, she became deeply concerned with over-crowding, inadequate facilities, “unhygienic conditions,” and the exporting by bus of the top three grades to the Fulmore School. She invited School Board Member Willie Kocurek to a St. Elmo P-TA meeting to present school development plans, where he “found himself explaining to a stacked-to-the-rafters audience just why it was unfortunately true that no new school could be provided for some time to come.” Consequently, Wagoner and others lobbied Kocurek and Superintendent Irby Carruth to breakdown a plan already in motion for one large school into three smaller neighborhood schools: the Molly Dawson School, the Jerry Joslin school, and “the Margaret Riley School in the Ridgetop area.” Kocurek stated, “By cutting one large school into sections where they were most needed, we were able to give each of the over-crowded areas relief.”

Dawson opened in the same year that the U.S. Supreme Court ruled in Brown v Board of Education that racial segregation in public schools was unconstitutional. The decision amplified "white flight" into the suburbs and left less wealthy neighborhoods to struggle with unequal funds and de facto segregation. Studies showed that the "percentage of minorities rose in South Central Austin during the 1970s" Dawson, situated in the 1970 census tract 13.02 (later in tract 13.06 when split in 1980), was "the only one in South Austin in which Spanish-origin residents outnumber whites or blacks." Thus, many, if not most, of Dawson students were Mexican American. The area also struggled economically. Census tracts 13.05 and 13.06 "historically has been a low- and moderate-income area with a high need for social services, according to city Human Services Department officials." The demographics contributed to some of the school's challenges and creative educational approaches.

== Educational approaches ==
=== Bilingual education ===
In 1972, Dawson Elementary School became the first South Austin school in AISD to start a bilingual education program. Teachers Margarita Ramirez and Nancy Fuller briefly described the challenges of instituting a bilingual program at a school that had many Spanish-speaking parents, who "In their day were punished in school for speaking Spanish." While the school had a large Mexican-American student population, "the parents have avoided speaking their predominant language in their homes in order not to hinder their children's progress at school." According to Ramirez, "The first reaction we got [from the students] was that we would, speak in Spanish and they'd look up and say 'What?'" Initially, parents voiced concern about the program, but "the reversed emphasis, from a remedial program to an enrichment program, has brought delighted responses from parents," even sparking requests for more bilingual education in the higher level grades.

In the 1960s and 1970s, Dawson sought to develop an inclusive curriculum for its large population of Mexican American students. In addition to its leadership in bilingual education, the school developed lessons and extracurricular activities that attempted to incorporate the history and culture of its student population. In 1971, the school held its "International Fiesta Friday," which offered a "complete Mexican dinner" for 75 cents and encouraged Fiesta-goers "to wear costumes of their favorite country."

In the late 1970s, AISD's Department of Bilingual Education developed the "Title VII Bilingual Program" in order to meet the objectives of the Bilingual Education Act. Dawson and Becker were part of an "experimental group" of AISD schools to develop "experience-based curriculum" in tandem with bilingual education.^{[8]} For instance, in 1979, Dawson and Becker students learned about the history of the vaquero in their social studies lessons, and then students participated in a field trip, sponsored by the Title VII Bilingual Program, to the Asociacion de Charros de Austin "charreada" exhibition, or Mexican rodeo.

=== Progressive education ===
Simultaneous with starting a bilingual education program in 1972, Dawson initiated a Montessori-inspired approach to teaching students, or what was described as its "first individually guided education program, in which students are permitted to learn at their own rate." As a visiting reporter observed, "with students darting in and out, the teachers working with one particular group of students, and other groups of children working unassisted at their materials – each helping the other – the room hardly resembles the traditional classroom situation adults can remembers." During the 1970s, Dawson regularly applied progressive models for elementary education.

=== Literature ===
In her memoir, Spoken From the Heart, First Lady Laura Bush recalled the time she worked as the librarian at Dawson Elementary. Then going by her maiden name, Laura Welch, she oversaw Dawson's library from 1974 to 1977. Recalling her time at Dawson, Bush wrote, "Unlike other urban schools during that era, Dawson was lucky to have music, art, and physical education teachers, along with a librarian, and we were the only educators who had a chance to work with every student in the school." She added, "We taught our students about American history not simply with textbooks and time lines but through the music, art, and literature of the Revolutionary period. During gym, the students played Revolutionary-era games and learned colonial dances. We used grant money to take the children on field trips to the historic sites of Laredo and San Antonio. Many of our kids had barely been out of the confines of greater Austin." Bush's recollections offer some insight into the culture of the school and its socio-economics.

Bush's fellow teacher, Judy Harbour, recalled how Laura Bush "jumped right in" to the culture of the school: "Laura fixed up the library as if it were a restaurant, with tablecloths on the tables ... she served cookies and punch and taught the children manners—how to place your napkin in your lap and which utensil to use." Laura Bush participated in the inventiveness of the school at a time of great imagination, but her tenure was brief. Laura Bush, nee Welch, gave her two-week notice to Dawson shortly after George H. W. Bush proposed marriage. Nonetheless, her time as a public-school librarian permanently shaped her views on education and books. Reflecting back, she stated, "I think teaching in minority schools opened my eyes. It made me realize how unfair in a lot of ways life is." She has stated that these experiences shaped her contributions to her husband's "sweeping education reforms," including creating "reading readiness programs for preschoolers" and expanding the federal Head Start program. Her work as a librarian also played a significant role in her creation of the Texas Book Festival.

In the late 1970s, Dawson continued to turn to literature to inspire student learning. In 1977, Dawson participated in a federally-funded four-week summer program to serve educationally disadvantaged students. The summer program, led by summer principal Dr. James Nabhan, centered the program "around children's literature, especially the tale of Alice in Wonderland.... Students wrote and illustrated books, put on plays in theaters they build and saw special presentations of "Alice in Wonderland" as plays and a puppet show." Other programs illustrate how Dawson used children's literature to teach in diverse subjects, including to develop its 1978 choir program. In 1979, the faculty drew on the popularity of Star Wars and Star Trek to initiate a science fiction literature unit, with every grade participating in a wide variety of projects: "Reading, art and even music are being taught through the science fiction model."

=== Music ===
In the 1970s and early 1980s, music teacher Mary Beth Gartner spearheaded the school's lively music program, preceding Austin's reputation as the "live music capital of the world." Most notably, in 1975, Gartner applied for a grant to create "The Magic Time Machine" program to teach U.S. history "backwards from the present time to 1776 in their studies of art, music, library skills and physical education." Teachers introduced students to the past through multiple field trips, historical reenactments, crafts, props, and costumes. The program culminated in a day-long Bicentennial celebration, entitled, "You've Come a Long Way, U.S.A.," and held on May 21, 1976. Highlights of the celebration included, "a 50 pound Liberty Bell made up of more than 1,000 cupcakes," "a flag ceremony conducted by the Bergstrom Air Force Base Color Guard," and a student "pageant depicting the growth of the United States." Guest speakers included "the Mayor Jeffrey Friedman, Council member Margaret Hoffman, and Beverly Sheffield, director of the Austin Bicentennial Affairs Office." Historical tensions in the celebration can be discerned from the event's inclusion of a presentation from the United Daughters of the Confederacy (by Jesse E. Fox) alongside exhibitions of Mexican-American, African American, and Native American History art and history (including artists Paul Valdez, Roberto Munguia, Bertram Allen, later president of the W.H. Passon Historical Society for Black History in Austin, Obby Nwabuko, and Robert Harrington). Dawson organizers of the event included Gartner, librarian Laura Welch, physical education teacher Eddie Bellinger, art teacher Virginia Gram, and instructional aides Carolyn Saunders and Bettey Braske.

While the Bicentennial program stands out as a massive undertaking, Gartner continued to put together creative programs for the school. In 1978, Gartner ambitiously put on four productions of "A Charlie Brown Christmas," featuring a total of 100 third-grade actors "to give everyone a chance at stardom." In 1980, Gartner directed "Christmas in Foreign Lands and Home."

In the spring of 1979, musician and scholar Robert "Dude" Skiles, also known as "Beto" in the jazz group Beto y Los Fairlanes, visited Dawson to introduce students to an array of jazz styles: "The 30-year-old jazz musician laid down the history of jazz in a wacky way that had students and teachers alike clapping their hands and chuckling at the same time." Skiles's trumpet "Informances" at Austin area schools were partly sponsored by "a grant from the National Endowment for the Arts, a local musicians' trust fund, the Austin Parks and Recreation Department and the Austin Independent School District" to educate students prior to the Austin Jazz Festival.

=== Dawson in the 1980s ===
Principal Mary Stinson, who happened to be the great niece of Mollie Dawson, began working at Dawson in the late 1970s. In 1980, school principal Mary Stinson initiated a "Mini-Merits" program to give students "spontaneous awards for appropriate behavior," perhaps applying some of the emerging pedagogical theories of the period. For instance, B.F. Skinner had published expansively on the psychology of positive reinforcement and "operant conditioning," including in his 1968 book, The Technologies of Teaching. Stinson introduced positive rewards, but also introduced, demerits that may have bordered between negative reinforcement and ineffective punishment. Students received demerits for "breaking one of the four school rules: 1) Walk, don't run, 2) use good language, 3) respect adults, other students, and school property, and 4) carry a permit." Stinson encouraged students to "work off demerits within two weeks by a concentrated effort in whatever rule was broken," though if a child accumulated three demerits, they had to "appear before the Student Council, which uses peer pressure to correct the demerits."
