= Copperfield, Texas =

Coordinates: 29.8829°N 95.6430°W

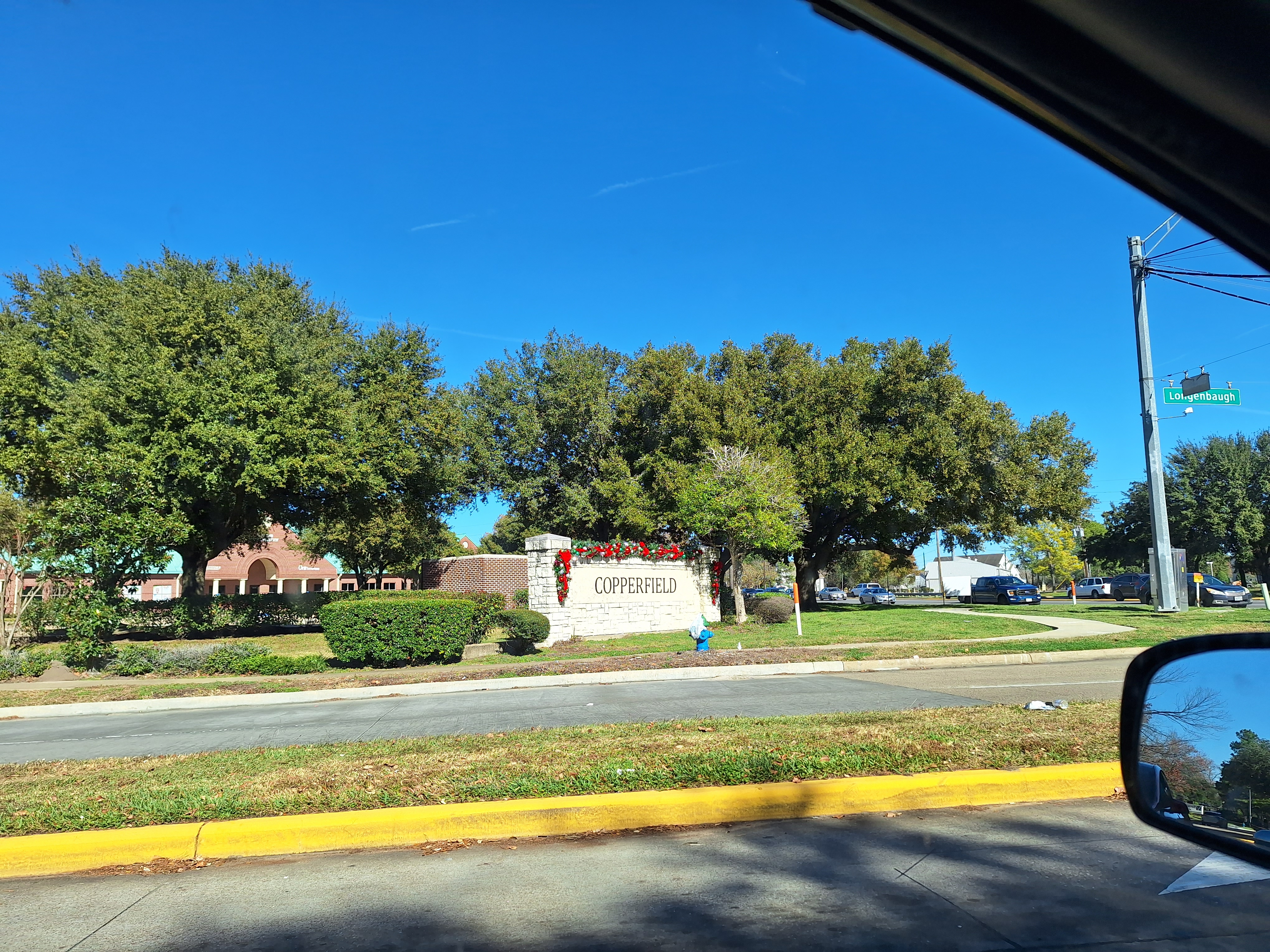
sign

Copperfield is a series of master-planned subdivisions in unincorporated northwestern Harris County, Texas, United States. The community, developed by Friendswood Development Company, has 1,800 acres (7.3 km^{2}) of land.

Horsepen Bayou and its tributaries are within the community.

== History ==
Friendswood Development Company bought 1,800 acres (7.3 km^{2}) at the corner of Texas State Highway 6 and Farm to Market Road 529 from the Gus Wortham estate in 1977. Two years later the first houses in Copperfield had been built and sold. In 1989 Friendswood Development bought an additional 260 acres (110 ha) and continued building houses into the 1990s. In 1991 Standard Pacific of Houston had acquired 70 acres (28 ha) in Copperfield from Friendswood Development and planned to build 265 houses in Copperfield Place Village, a community within Copperfield.

== Notable people ==
- Riff Raff, rapper
- John Culberson, nine-term member of the House
