= Dawson, Austin, Texas =

Dawson
- Neighborhood
- Coordinates: 30°13′59″N 97°45′41″W
- Country: United States
- State: Texas
- City: Austin

Population (2020)
  - Total: 2,927
- Time zone: UTC-6 (CST)
  - Summer (DST): UTC-5 (CDT)
- ZIP Codes: 78704
- Area codes: 512, 737

Dawson is a neighborhood in South Austin, Texas bordered by Oltorf Road on the north, Ben White/290 on the south, South 1st Street on the west, and Congress Avenue on the east.

== Demographics ==
According to data from the United States Census Bureau, the total population of Dawson was 2,927 as of 2020. Of this population, 70.7% of census respondents identified as white, 3.9% identified as Asian, 2.3% identified as Black or African American, 1.1% identified as American Indian and Alaska Native, and 6.7% identified as some other race, and 15.5% identified as two or more races. The median annual household income in Dawson during the five-year period from 2017 to 2021 was an estimated $84,963, compared to a median income of $79,542 in the city of Austin.

== Education ==
=== Public primary and secondary education ===
Dawson is served by Austin Independent School District. The neighborhood is zoned for two elementary schools (Dawson Elementary School and Galindo Elementary School), Fulmore Middle School, and William B. Travis High School.

=== Higher education ===
The Dawson neighborhood lies adjacent to the St. Edward's University campus.

== Recreation ==
Dawson is home to Gillis Neighborhood Park and Cumberland Community Garden.
