= Onion Creek, Austin, Texas =

Onion Creek, Texas
- Census-designated place
- Neighborhood Boundaries
- Location within the state of Texas
- Coordinates: 30°07′47″N 97°47′18″W
- Country: United States
- State: Texas
- County: Travis

Area
  - Total: 3.2 sq mi (8.4 km^{2})
  - Land: 3.2 sq mi (8.4 km^{2})
  - Water: 0 sq mi (0.0 km^{2})
- Elevation: 594 ft (181 m)

Population (2000)
  - Total: 2,116
  - Density: 656/sq mi (253.3/km^{2})
- Time zone: UTC-6 (Central (CST))
  - Summer (DST): UTC-5 (CDT)
- FIPS code: 48-54063
- GNIS feature ID: 2408990

Onion Creek is a neighborhood in Austin, Texas, United States.

Onion Creek is also the name of a creek that starts in Hays County and empties into the Colorado River.

== Geography ==
Onion Creek is located 10 miles (16 km) south of downtown Austin.

According to the United States Census Bureau, the CDP has a total area of 3.2 square miles (8.3 km^{2}), all of it land.

== Demographics ==
Historical population
Census	Pop.	Note	%±
1990	1,544		—
2000	2,116		37.0%
U.S. Decennial Census; 1850–1900 1910; 1920 1930 1940; 1950 1960 1970; 1980 1990 2000; 2010

Onion Creek first appeared as a census-designated place in the 1990 U.S. census. It was deleted prior to the 2010 U.S. census after being absorbed by the city of Austin, Texas.

=== 2000 census ===
Onion Creek CDP, Texas – Racial and ethnic composition Note: the US Census treats Hispanic/Latino as an ethnic category. This table excludes Latinos from the racial categories and assigns them to a separate category. Hispanics/Latinos may be of any race.
Race / Ethnicity (NH = Non-Hispanic)	Pop. 2000	% 2000
White alone (NH)	1,848	87.33%
Black or African American alone (NH)	23	1.03%
Native American or Alaska Native alone (NH)	5	0.24%
Asian alone (NH)	23	1.09%
Pacific Islander alone (NH)	0	0.00%
Other race alone (NH)	2	0.09%
Mixed race or Multiracial (NH)	22	1.04%
Hispanic or Latino (any race)	193	9.12%
Total	2,116	100.00%

As of the census of 2000, there were 2,116 people, 1,002 households, and 742 families living in the CDP. The population density was 656.1 inhabitants per square mile (253.3/km^{2}). There were 1,038 housing units at an average density of 321.9 per square mile (124.3/km^{2}). The racial makeup of the CDP was 93.10% White, 1.18% African American, 0.28% Native American, 1.13% Asian, 0.05% Pacific Islander, 2.65% from other races, and 1.61% from two or more races. Hispanic or Latino of any race were 9.12% of the population.

There were 1,002 households, out of which 12.6% had children under the age of 18 living with them, 69.5% were married couples living together, 3.6% had a female householder with no husband present, and 25.9% were non-families. 21.9% of all households were made up of individuals, and 11.7% had someone living alone who was 65 years of age or older. The average household size was 2.11 and the average family size was 2.41.

In the CDP, the population was spread out, with 10.0% under the age of 18, 3.4% from 18 to 24, 18.0% from 25 to 44, 40.3% from 45 to 64, and 28.3% who were 65 years of age or older. The median age was 55 years. For every 100 females, there were 89.3 males. For every 100 females age 18 and over, there were 88.1 males.

The median income for a household in the CDP was $87,924, and the median income for a family was $97,151. Males had a median income of $70,260 versus $45,781 for females. The per capita income for the CDP was $54,758. About 1.0% of families and 1.2% of the population were below the poverty line, including none of those under age 18 and 2.1% of those age 65 or over.
