= Saint John, Austin, Texas =

Saint John
- Neighborhood
- Neighborhood Boundaries
- Coordinates: 30°19′48″N 97°41′53″W
- Country: United States
- State: Texas
- City: Austin
- Time zone: UTC-6 (CST)
  - Summer (DST): UTC-5 (CDT)
- ZIP Codes: 78752
- Area codes: 512, 737

Saint John (alternately Saint John's) is a neighborhood of Austin, Texas within the 78752 zip code. Geographically, the neighborhood straddles Interstate 35. It is bounded on the west by Middle Fiskville Road and Twincrest, on the south by U.S. 290, on the north by Anderson Lane, and on the east by Cameron Road.

Saint John is located entirely within City Council District 4.

== History ==
The neighborhood is named for the St. John's Industrial Institute and Home for Negro Orphans, which was built in 1906 and burned down in the 1940s. The institute and orphanage was operated by the St. John Regular Missionary Baptist District Association, which was formed by a group of African-American ministers in Wheatville. The association also hosted an annual encampment on the site of the institute. The land was eventually sold and developed into the Highland Mall. As part of the redevelopment of Highland Mall into a mixed-use Austin Community College campus, part of the land was redeveloped into an urban park called "St. John's Encampment Commons".

Researchers from the University of Texas at Austin have identified the Saint John and adjacent Coronado Hills neighborhood as vulnerable to gentrification as of the late 2010s.

== Education ==
=== Public primary and secondary education ===
Saint John is served by the Austin Independent School District. Students in the neighborhood are zoned for one of three elementary schools (Brown Elementary School, Pickle Elementary School, or Reilly Elementary School), Webb Middle School, and one of three high schools (Juan Navarro Early College High School, McCallum High School, or Northeast Early College High School).

== Recreation ==
St. John Park is located within the Saint John neighborhood, as is the Virginia L. Brown Recreation Center and the St. John Branch of Austin Public Library.
