= Dove Springs, Austin, Texas =

Neighborhood in Austin, Texas, US

Coordinates: 57°18′22″N 4°27′32″W

Neighborhood map

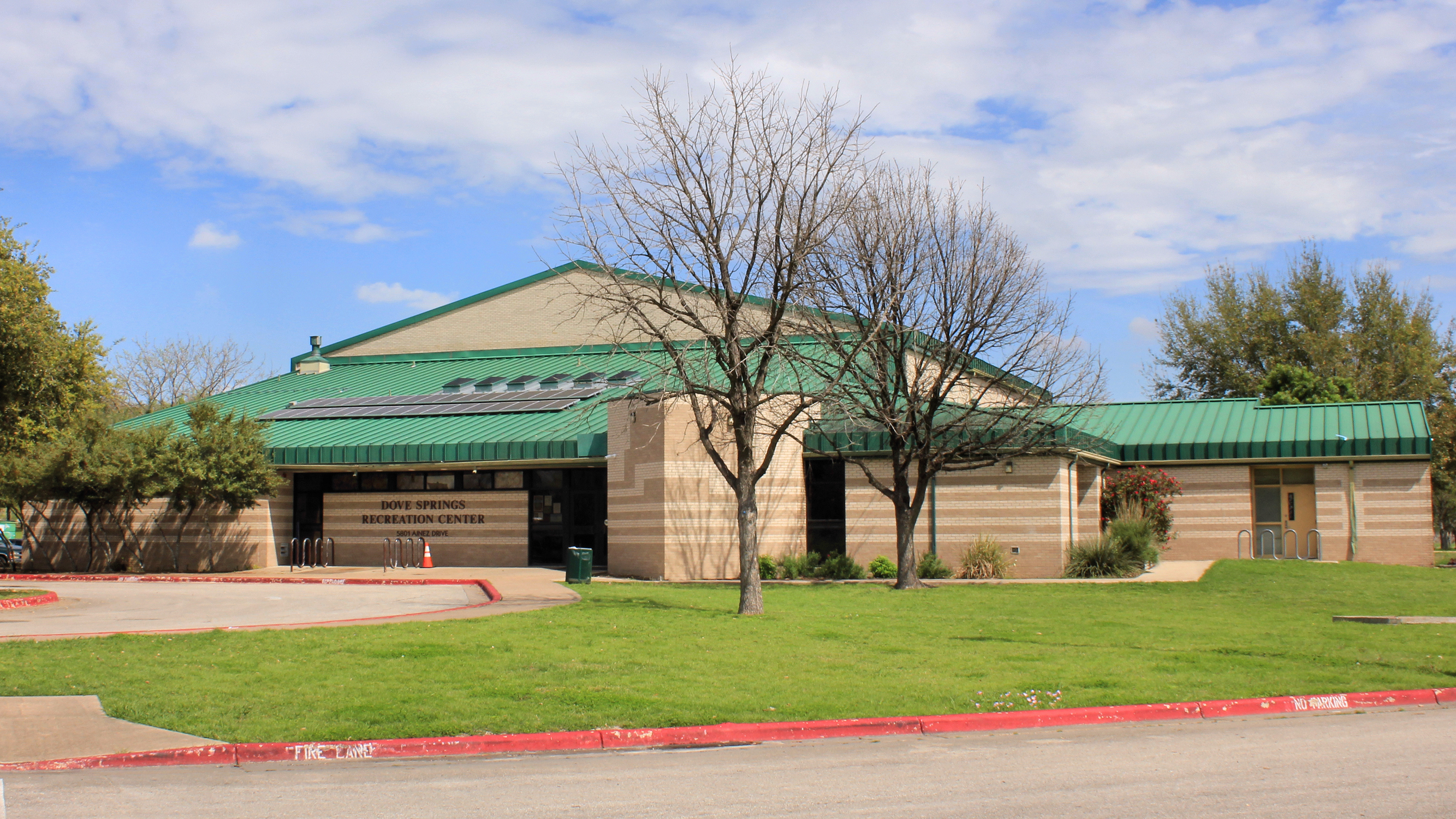
Dove Springs Recreation Center

Dove Springs, nicknamed the "44" after the area ZIP Codes, is a neighborhood in Austin, Texas.

Sam Ramos of the Austin Chronicle stated that the unofficial boundaries of Dove Springs are William Cannon, Ben White, an area east of Dove Springs District Park, and Interstate 35. It is 6 miles (9.7 km) from Downtown Austin.

In 2014 Joy Diaz of KUT stated that the community "had a less than desirable reputation" for a period of several decades and that it "is also one of the poorest parts of Austin."

== Demographics ==
Diaz stated in 2014 that the population historically consisted of renters making low incomes. Of them, a large number had recently immigrated to the United States and lacked English fluency. The Texas Department of Criminal Justice (TDCJ) operates the sole Austin-area parole office at the intersection of Texas State Highway 71 and Woodward in Dove Springs, and because of that many parolees settle in the community.

== Government and infrastructure ==
The community is within the City of Austin Franklin Park planning area with other portions in the McKinney planning area.

== Education ==
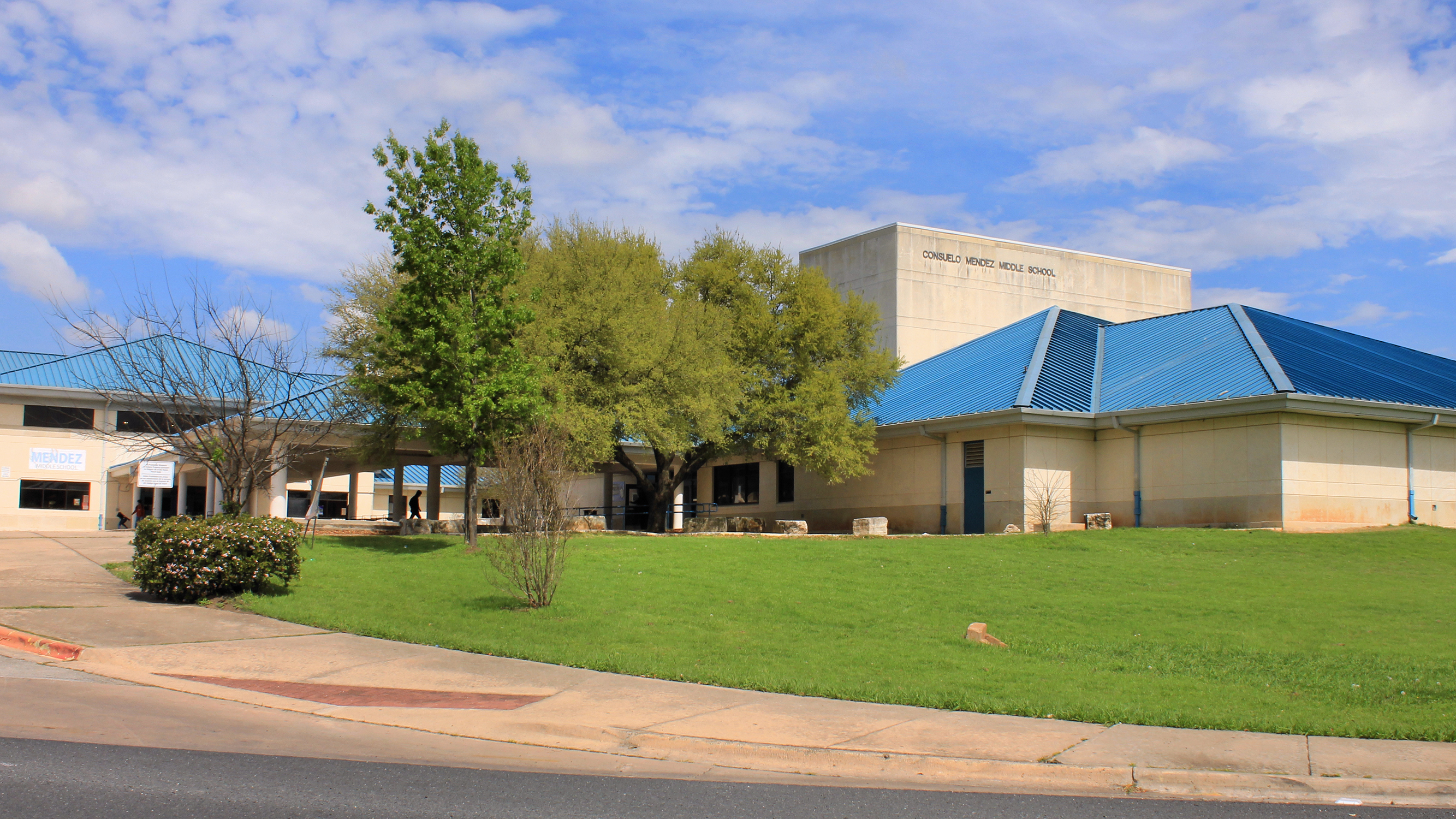
Consuelo Mendez Middle School

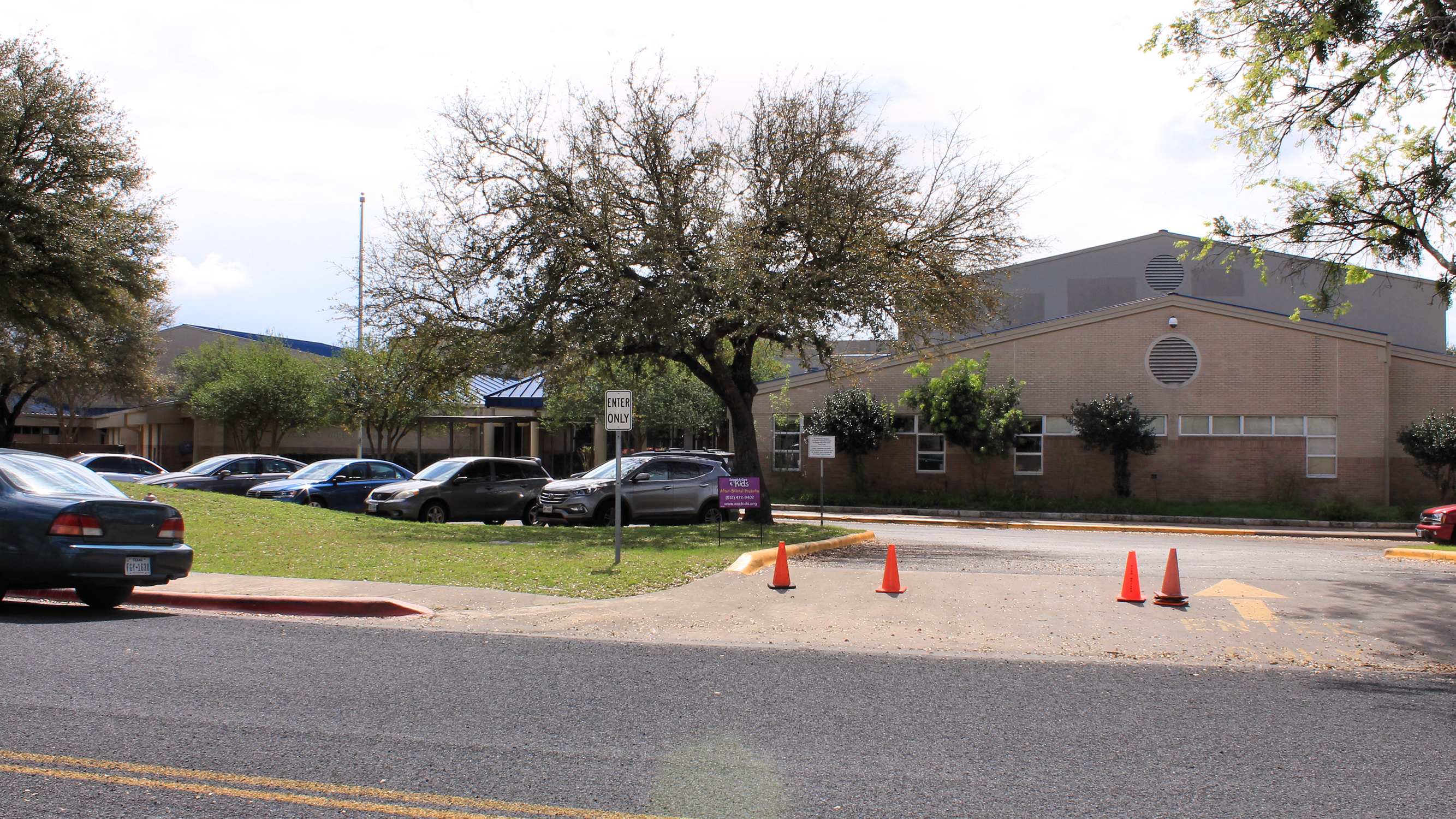
Widen Elementary School

The Austin Independent School District operates the public schools.

Elementary schools:

- Blazier Elementary School
- Houston Elementary School
- Langford Elementary School
- Palm Elementary School
- Perez Elementary School
- Rodriguez Elementary School
- Widen Elementary School

Consuelo Mendez Middle School is within Dove Springs. Two high schools serve sections of Dove Springs: Akins High School and Travis High School.

There is an area charter school called the Harmony School of Excellence, which moved into the area around 2009. As of 2014 many students are from Dove Springs and Del Valle.

== Recreation ==
The City of Austin operates the 18,000-square-foot (1,700 m^{2}) Dove Springs Recreation Center. The outside of the center has a nature walking trail, one swimming pool, one outdoor tennis court, one sand volleyball pit, one outdoor basketball court, three soccer fields, three baseball fields, and two outdoor tennis courts, one pavilion, and one playscape. There is a building with an arts and crafts room, a full court gymnasium, a television room and lobby, and a weight room.
