= French Place, Austin, Texas =

Neighborhood of Austin, Texas

Coordinates: 30.291°N 97.718°W

Neighborhood map

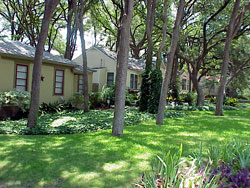
Shaded streets can be found all over French Place. The neighborhood consists of single family homes, bungalows, and small multifamily, though there are also apartments located along the Manor Road area.

French Place is a historic, residential neighborhood and sub-district of the Upper Boggy Creek area in East central Austin, Texas. Believed to have been originally established on the former site of the 19th-century French family dairy farm, the neighborhood is defined by its dense canopy of heritage pecan trees and a highly diverse architectural landscape that spans from 1920s Craftsman bungalows to mid-century modern estates.

Its close proximity to downtown and bordering the University of Texas at Austin to the west and the Mueller Redevelopment to the east, French Place has evolved from a rural agricultural outpost into one of Austin's most prominent "Old Austin" enclaves.

It is widely recognized for its bohemian character, its proximity to the Manor Road cultural corridor, and a long-standing tradition of civic activism that has preserved its scale amidst the city's rapid 21st-century urbanization.

== Geography and Boundaries ==
The neighborhood is a subdivision of the vibrant Cherrywood district, serving as a quieter residential neighbor to UT Austin. Its location is roughly bounded by the following points of interest:

- North: East 38 1/2 Street
- South: Manor Road
- East: Airport Boulevard
- West: Interstate 35 ("I-35")

== History and Development ==
=== Early settlement and the French farm (1880-1930) ===
Before it was a residential enclave, the land north of Manor Road was primarily agricultural and believed to have been primarily owned by two families: the Giles (as in Giles Road) and the Pattersons (as in Patterson Park).

According to property records from the Cherrywood Neighborhood Association (CNA), James H. French and his descendants, Walter Schieffer, and others were among some of the named "early owners" of the land that would eventually become the French Place and Cherrywood subdivisions. While later developers like Bascom and Rogan Giles platted the specific residential subdivisions (Giles One and Two) in the 1940s, the Frenches are credited alongside other historic figures like Schieffer and Nye Patterson as the individuals whose property ownership and legacy are "reflected in the names of streets and parks" within the area.

However, the collection of possible namesakes muddies the origin waters, making it difficult to precisely identify how the collection of subdivisions in the region came to be known as "French Place." This challenge was further acknowledged by the CNA in its 2013 newsletter, The Flea:

"So what is French Place and what are its boundaries? Possibly everything south of Edgewood to Manor Rd. and east from I-35 to Cherrywood could be called French Place, though there’s no legal precedent for the name in city records. It’s not a legal subdivision, it’s just the way neighborhood terminology evolved. Since the Nowlin and Dancy families had so many ties to France and New Orleans, maybe they called it French Place from the outset. Maybe neighbors just liked the name of the street. Maybe J.H. French had a hand in it. We may never know for certain." —The Flea, Cherrywood Neighborhood Association, 2013

=== The Giles subdivisions and residential boom (1930-1955) ===
The modern residential character of French Place was forged by the Giles family, prominent Austin landowners who also developed the Pemberton Heights neighborhood. In the 1940s, the family platted the Giles One and Two subdivisions, marketing the lots to middle-class professionals and university faculty.

Development during this era was specifically designed to preserve the existing pecan and fruit orchards that occupied the former farmsteads, resulting in the neighborhood's heavily wooded aesthetic. Unlike more uniform post-war suburbs, the Giles developments allowed for a mix of architectural styles, including English Cottages and Craftsman bungalows, often commissioned by individual homeowners.

=== Post-war expansion and the "Pecan Orchard" era (1940-1959) ===
The most significant land development surge occurred immediately following World War II. As returning veterans utilized the GI Bill to seek housing near UT Austin and downtown, the French family land was formally platted and subdivided.

Unlike the rigid "cookie-cutter" developments found in South Austin, the subdivision of French Place was developed in smaller, idiosyncratic clusters. Builders during this period took advantage of the fertile soil–remnants of the old farm–to plant or preserve hundreds of Pecan trees, which remain a significant feature of the neighborhood's canopy today.

==== Timeline of development ====
- 1942: The first major wave of modern subdivision begins.
- 1948: Significant infrastructure comes into existence, including paved roads and integrated sewage, expanding to the heart of the district.
- 1955: Construction of the nearby Interstate 35 (formerly East Avenue) begins, physically and psychologically separating French Place from the Western neighborhoods, solidifying its identity as an "East Side" sanctuary.

=== Integration and civic activism (1960-1990) ===
During the mid-20th century, French Place became a pocket of relative stability amongst the rapid changes of the Civil Rights era in Austin. As it sat on the border of historically segregated lines, the neighborhood became a "transitional zone." It attracted a diverse mix of "Bohemian" academics, artists, and state workers who valued the area's lack of pretension.

By the 1970s, the neighborhood faced significant pressure from the expansion of I-35 and the commercialization of Airport Boulevard. Consequently, French Place became a central pillar of the Austin Neighborhoods Council (ANC) movement. The residents of French Place, including the likes of Joan Bartz, were instrumental in establishing a culture of "neighborhood independence," successfully fighting off high-density rezoning and commercial encroachment from the Airport Boulevard Corridor. But for the successful lobbying efforts for the protection of the neighborhood's "Old Austin" character, the commercialization of Airport Boulevard would have otherwise demolished the original 1940s housing stock.

In the 1980s, the formation of the Upper Boggy Creek Neighborhood Association (UBCNA) marked a shift toward organized civic activism. This activism cemented the neighborhood's reputation as a "Bohemian" enclave for university faculty and artists, a reputation that persists even as property values have surged due to its proximity to the Mueller Redevelopment.

=== Modern era and preservation (2000-present) ===
By the turn of the 21st century, French Place experienced a surge in property values due to its proximity to the St. David's Medical Center and the Mueller Redevelopment. The neighborhood has continued to face contemporary challenges common to Central Austin, such as:

1. Gentrification: The transition of older, modest cottages into high-value modern estates.
2. In-fill Development: The construction of "Accessory Dwelling Units" (ADUs) to address the city's housing shortage while attempting to maintain the neighborhood's original scale.
3. Conservation: Ongoing efforts to designate certain blocks as historic districts to prevent the demolition of 1940s-era bungalows.
