= Wells Branch, Texas =

- Census-designated place
- Location of Wells Branch, Texas
- Coordinates: 30°26′38″N 97°40′42″W
- Country: United States
- State: Texas
- County: Travis

Area
  - Total: 2.5 sq mi (6.6 km^{2})
  - Land: 2.5 sq mi (6.6 km^{2})
  - Water: 0 sq mi (0.0 km^{2})
- Elevation: 820 ft (250 m)

Population (2020)
  - Total: 14,000
  - Density: 5,500/sq mi (2,100/km^{2})
- Time zone: UTC-6 (Central (CST))
  - Summer (DST): UTC-5 (CDT)
- Zip Code: 78728
- FIPS code: 48-77196
- GNIS feature ID: 2409542

Wells Branch is a census-designated place (CDP) in Travis County, Texas, United States. The population was 14,000 at the 2020 census.

== History ==
In 1835, Wayman Frederick Wells (1815–1878) "joined the Texas army, becoming a scout and spy" during battles in Goliad and San Antonio, when the Republic of Texas declared its independence from Mexico. He married Mary Emeline Bacon in 1849; they had nine children. The Wayman family settled on Walnut Creek in the Wells Branch area in 1855.

== Geography ==
Wells Branch is located 13 miles (21 km) north of downtown Austin.

According to the United States Census Bureau, the CDP has a total area of 2.5 square miles (6.6 km^{2}), of which 2.5 square miles (6.6 km^{2}) is land and 0.39% is water.

== Demographics ==
Historical population
Census	Pop.	Note	%±
1990	7,094		—
2000	11,271		58.9%
2010	12,120		7.5%
2020	14,000		15.5%
U.S. Decennial Census; 1850–1900 1910; 1920 1930 1940; 1950 1960 1970; 1980 1990 2000; 2010

Wells Branch first appeared as a census-designated place in the 1990 U.S. census.

=== Racial and ethnic composition ===
Wells Branch CDP, Texas – Racial and ethnic composition Note: the US Census treats Hispanic/Latino as an ethnic category. This table excludes Latinos from the racial categories and assigns them to a separate category. Hispanics/Latinos may be of any race.
Race / Ethnicity (NH = Non-Hispanic)	Pop 2000	Pop 2010	Pop 2020	% 2000	% 2010	% 2020
White alone (NH)	6,966	5,540	5,497	61.80%	45.71%	39.26%
Black or African American alone (NH)	1,062	1,776	2,426	9.42%	14.65%	17.33%
Native American or Alaska Native alone (NH)	27	30	30	0.24%	0.25%	0.21%
Asian alone (NH)	1,071	915	1,039	9.50%	7.55%	7.42%
Native Hawaiian or Pacific Islander alone (NH)	18	21	13	0.16%	0.17%	0.09%
Other race alone (NH)	24	33	69	0.21%	0.27%	0.49%
Mixed race or Multiracial (NH)	223	330	561	1.98%	2.72%	4.01%
Hispanic or Latino (any race)	1,880	3,475	4,365	16.68%	28.67%	31.18%
Total	11,271	12,120	14,000	100.00%	100.00%	100.00%

=== 2020 census ===
As of the 2020 census, Wells Branch had a population of 14,000. The median age was 32.6 years. 19.9% of residents were under the age of 18 and 9.1% of residents were 65 years of age or older. For every 100 females there were 101.0 males, and for every 100 females age 18 and over there were 98.9 males age 18 and over.

100.0% of residents lived in urban areas, while 0.0% lived in rural areas.

There were 6,665 households in Wells Branch, of which 24.9% had children under the age of 18 living in them. Of all households, 29.5% were married-couple households, 28.4% were households with a male householder and no spouse or partner present, and 33.0% were households with a female householder and no spouse or partner present. About 40.0% of all households were made up of individuals and 7.4% had someone living alone who was 65 years of age or older. There were 2,852 families residing in the CDP.

There were 7,130 housing units, of which 6.5% were vacant. The homeowner vacancy rate was 0.8% and the rental vacancy rate was 7.5%.

=== 2010 census ===
As of the census of 2010, there were officially 12,120 people, 5,490 households, and 2,580 families residing in the CDP. This number is considered low as the governing body, the Wells Branch Municipal Utility District, estimates the population in 2010 to be approximately 18,000 residents including the numerous multi-family residents on the southern side of the district. The population density was 4,456.3 inhabitants per square mile (1,720.6/km^{2}). There were 5,625 housing units at an average density of 2,224.0 per square mile (858.7/km^{2}). The racial makeup of the CDP was 71.30% White, 9.65% African American, 0.40% Native American, 9.59% Asian, 0.17% Pacific Islander, 5.93% from other races, and 2.96% from two or more races. Hispanic or Latino of any race were 16.68% of the population.

There were 5,490 households, out of which 24.8% had children under the age of 18 living with them, 35.8% were married couples living together, 8.4% had a female householder with no husband present, and 53.0% were non-families. 40.9% of all households were made up of individuals, and 1.0% had someone living alone who was 65 years of age or older. The average household size was 2.05 and the average family size was 2.87.

In the CDP, the population was spread out, with 20.0% under the age of 18, 14.4% from 18 to 24, 49.3% from 25 to 44, 14.2% from 45 to 64, and 2.2% who were 65 years of age or older. The median age was 30 years. For every 100 females, there were 101.1 males. For every 100 females age 18 and over, there were 100.8 males.

The median income for a household in the CDP was $46,934, and the median income for a family was $60,530. Males had a median income of $43,645 versus $32,063 for females. The per capita income for the CDP was $27,664. About 4.1% of families and 4.5% of the population were below the poverty line, including 5.2% of those under age 18 and none of those age 65 or over.

== Governance ==
Wells Branch is a Municipal Utility District that supplies water/wastewater service to residents as well as manages parks and other recreational facilities and programs. The District is recognized for its substantial commitment to water conservation including a significant rain water harvesting program designed into District Facilities and an irrigation well completed in September 2014.

Originally governed by a Board appointed by the original developer, in 1987 residents won a majority of the five seats on the Board. Residents have governed the District since that time.

Over the years, the Board expanded the park system with a Park Master Plan, added a second competition pool, a Community Center, a Recreation Center, and redeveloped a former stock pond into a small lake in the middle of the park system.

The Board has also undertaken multiple projects in recent years, including adding a skate park, remodeling the recreation center, and remodeling the Willow Bend Pool.

The Wells Branch Municipal Utility District provides all services to residents except Police and courts, which are provided through the Travis County Sheriff's Department and Travis County, and Fire and Fire Based EMS services, which are provided by Travis County Emergency Services District #2 (FIRE) and Travis County Emergency Services District # 17 (EMS).

== Education ==
The CDP is divided between the Pflugerville Independent School District and Round Rock Independent School District

Three schools, including North West Elementary of Pflugerville ISD and Wells Branch Arts Integration Academy and Joe Lee Johnson Elementary of (Round Rock ISD), serve the community of Wells Branch.

== Library ==
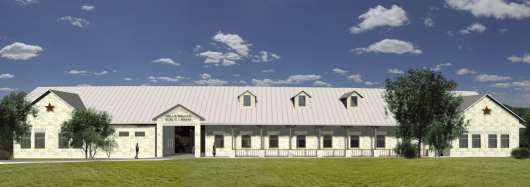
Wells Branch Library

The Wells Branch Library district was formed in 1998 after a state law was passed to allow the establishment of library districts in areas not currently served by library systems. As a result, the library is funded by a sales tax revenue of 1/2% from Wells Branch businesses. An elected board of five manages the funds and operations of the Wells Branch Community library. The library has over 42,000 items available for checkout, rooms for community use, and over 20 computers for patron use.

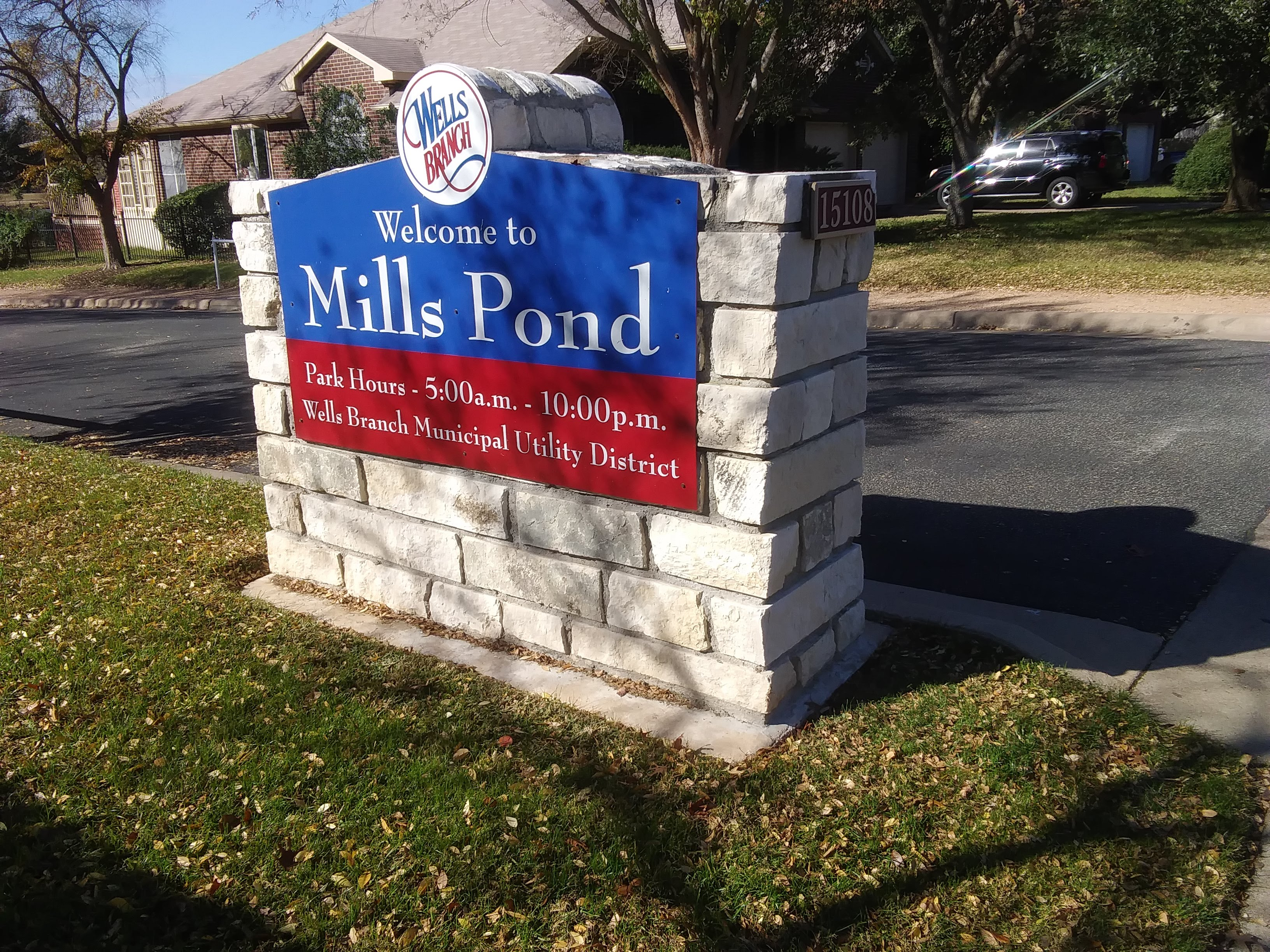
Mills pond entrance sign

== Mills Pond ==
Mills Pond is a reservoir for Wells Branch creek. Wells Branch creek begins in Wells Branch and is a Tributary of Walnut Creek which travels south through the city of Austin, Texas and eventually empties into the Colorado River.
