= Barton Hills, Austin, Texas =

Neighborhood is the south of Austin, Texas

Coordinates: 30°15′29″N 97°46′52″W

Neighborhood map

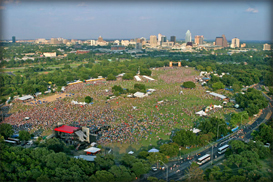
One of the biggest events in the area is the annual Austin City Limits Music Festival

Barton Hills is a neighborhood in Austin, Texas. It is located in south Austin, and encompasses part of ZIP code 78704.

Barton Hills is bounded by South Lamar and Zilker neighborhoods to the east, Barton Springs Road and Zilker Park to the north, Barton Creek and the Spyglass-Barton's Bluff neighborhood to the west and the Capital of Texas Highway to the south.

Barton Hills is primarily residential, with the oldest homes dating back to the 1940s. Additionally, the area is home to several attractions including the Barton Creek Greenbelt nature preserve and the Umlauf Sculpture Garden and Museum. Just north of the neighborhood are Barton Springs Pool, a natural spring fed by Barton Creek, and the 351-acre Zilker Park.

Barton Hills is located within city council District 5.

== History ==
In 1837, William "Uncle Billy" Barton set up his pioneer homestead near a natural spring on the southern bank of the Colorado River, naming the springs after his daughters Parthenia, Eliza and Zenobia. Their names did not stick, but William's did and 160 years later the springs, the pool, and several popular Austin neighborhoods bear the name "Barton".

Established in the 1940s and 1950s with construction continuing through the 1970s to the late 1990s, Barton Hills contains many different styles of single-family homes. In the 1940s, noted Austin-based architect A.D. Stenger designed and built a group of contemporary mid-century modern homes in a section of land bound by Arthur Street and Ariole Way. Barton Hills was featured in Austin's 1956 Parade of Homes as "the world's largest air-conditioned subdivision." Beginning in that year, it was platted as a subdivision in six sections by S.R. Sheppard, Builders Development Corporation and others. Barton Hills eventually had 1,585 lots planned on its 535 acres (0.84 square mile).

During the 1972 presidential election, Barton Hills was labeled a political bellwether, described as being a microcosm of the national population. In the 1970s, much of the lots and streets west of Barton Skyway were re-platted into a subdivision named "Horseshoe Bend". In 1978, City Manager Dan Davidson asked the Austin City Council to authorize preliminary engineering to build a previously proposed bridge over Barton Creek to connect Barton Skyway from Spyglass Drive to Barton Hills Drive. The city also planned to extend Barton Skyway west to Bee Caves Road, along with connecting various gaps east between Lightsey Road to Woodward Street. Residents of Barton Hills and Horseshoe Bend protested the bridge, concerned about increased traffic and damage to Barton Creek. The bridge was eventually shelved and the former right-of-way was absorbed into the Barton Creek Greenbelt.

== Demographics ==
According to data from the U.S. Census Bureau, the population of the area defined as Barton Hills was 7,993 in 2009, across an area of 3.199 square miles. The population density per square miles is 2,499, just below the citywide average of 2,610 people per square mile. The racial breakdown is 80% white, 12% Hispanic/Latino, 4% Asian/Pacific Island, 2% black and 2% other. Median household income in 2009 was $51,930, slightly above the median household income for the city at large. The average estimated value of detached houses in 2009 was $395,682, notably higher than the citywide average of $286,025.

== Education ==
Barton Hills is served by the Austin Independent School District:

- Barton Hills Elementary School and Zilker Elementary School
- O. Henry Middle School
- Austin High School
