= Hancock, Austin, Texas =

Neighborhood of Austin, Texas

Coordinates: 30.298°N 97.724°W

Neighborhood map

Hancock is a neighborhood in north-central Austin, Texas. Hancock encompasses ZIP codes 78751 and 78705.

Hancock is located north of Downtown Austin and the University of Texas. It is bounded to the south by 32nd Street, to the west by Duval Street and Hyde Park and North University neighborhoods, to the north by 45th Street and the North Loop neighborhood and to the east by Interstate 35 and the Cherrywood and Wilshire Wood neighborhoods.

Hancock is located in city council District 9.

== History ==
One of the earliest settlers of the Hancock area was Susanna Dickinson, who was a survivor of the Battle of the Alamo and originally lived at the intersection of 32nd Street and Duval Street. Another early resident was Lewis Hancock, for whom the neighborhood was named. Hancock was mayor of Austin from 1895 to 1897 and also founded the Austin Country Club and Golf Course in the area in 1899. After the turn of the century, formal neighborhoods were planned in the North University area, which it was called at the time.

Directly south of the country club, which was considered suburban at the time, Dr. J.R. Bailey platted the Beau Site in 1910, and in 1912, the Austin Country Club expanded to 18 holes after the land east of Red River on which it was expanded was purchased by the club and its owners. In 1928, the neighborhood was subdivided into its current configuration, and Austin's population at the time was only around 35,000 residents, so the area was still considered to be on the outskirts of town.

St. David's Hospital was built around 32nd Street in 1924, when it opened its doors, and Concordia Lutheran College was also built on twenty acres of land from the Hancock Estate in 1926. Various commercial establishments sprang up shortly thereafter, and many prominent Austinites relocated to the Hancock neighborhood around the same time, including J. Frank Dobie, a well-known writer, and Edgar Perry Jr., a cotton broker, as well as Tom Miller, one of the early mayors of Austin who served two terms as mayor.

In 1946, the Austin Country Club relocated outside the city limits to present-day East Riverside Drive, and the city sold the back nine holes of the Hancock Golf Course, as it was called after the country club relocated, to the Sears Corporation to finance other recreational projects. The Sears store later became one of the flagship stores in the Hancock Center Shopping Plaza, which was built in 1963 on the back nine of the golf course and is considered Austin's first shopping mall. The other flagship store in Hancock Center is a huge H-E-B grocery store, among various other smaller stores, shops, and restaurants. During the 1960s it was home to the first Dillard's store in Texas and a Sears more than double the size of its original downtown store. Other early Hancock Center tenants included Merritt, Schaeffer, Brown, Snyder Chenards, Leon's, and Merle Norman Cosmetics.

The decline of Hancock Center could be traced to the opening of the fully enclosed Highland Mall in 1970. However, the Center was sold again in the 1990s and plans were announced to invest $11 million in remodeling. Pacific Retail Trust acquired the mall in 1996 and unveiled H-E-B's plans to construct a new grocery store with 94,000 square feet, almost three times the size of the original store opened in 1964. Today, Hancock Center is home to Jason's Deli, PetCo, Freebirds and many other businesses. The site of the former Sears has been refitted to be the headquarters of non-profit health care provider CommunityCare.

== Demographics ==
According to data from the U.S. Census Bureau, the population of the area defined as Hancock was 5,028 in 2009, over an area of 0.974 square miles. The population density per square mile is 5,164, nearly twice the city-wide average. The racial breakdown is 72% white, 14% Asian/Pacific Islander, 10% Hispanic/Latino, 1% Black, and 3% other. Median household income in 2009 was $29,758, well below that of Austin at large: $50,132. Conversely, the average estimated value of detached houses in 2009 (33.4% of all units) was $363,741, compared to the city-wide average of $286,025.

== Education ==
Hancock is served by the Austin Independent School District:

- Lee Elementary School
- Kealing Middle School
- McCallum High School
