= Copperfield, Austin, Texas =

Neighborhood near Pflugerville

Coordinates: 30.3883°N 97.6589°W

Neighborhood map

The neighborhood of Copperfield is located in the American city of north Austin, Texas (78753). The neighborhood was established as a planned community in 1982.

== Boundaries ==
Dessau Rd. and Parmer Ln. intersection, Dessau Rd. and Shropshire/Braker Ln. Cut-off intersection, and off east Yager Ln. and Parmer Ln. intersection (by the Sonic Drive-In), and Copperfield Dr. and Yager Ln. crossroad.

== Education ==
The neighborhood is in the Pflugerville Independent School District.

== Public schools ==
=== High schools ===
- John B. Connally

=== Middle schools ===
- Dessau

=== Elementary ===
- Copperfield
