= Zilker, Austin, Texas =

Neighborhood in Austin, Texas, U.S.

Coordinates: 30°15′N 97°46′W

Neighborhood boundaries

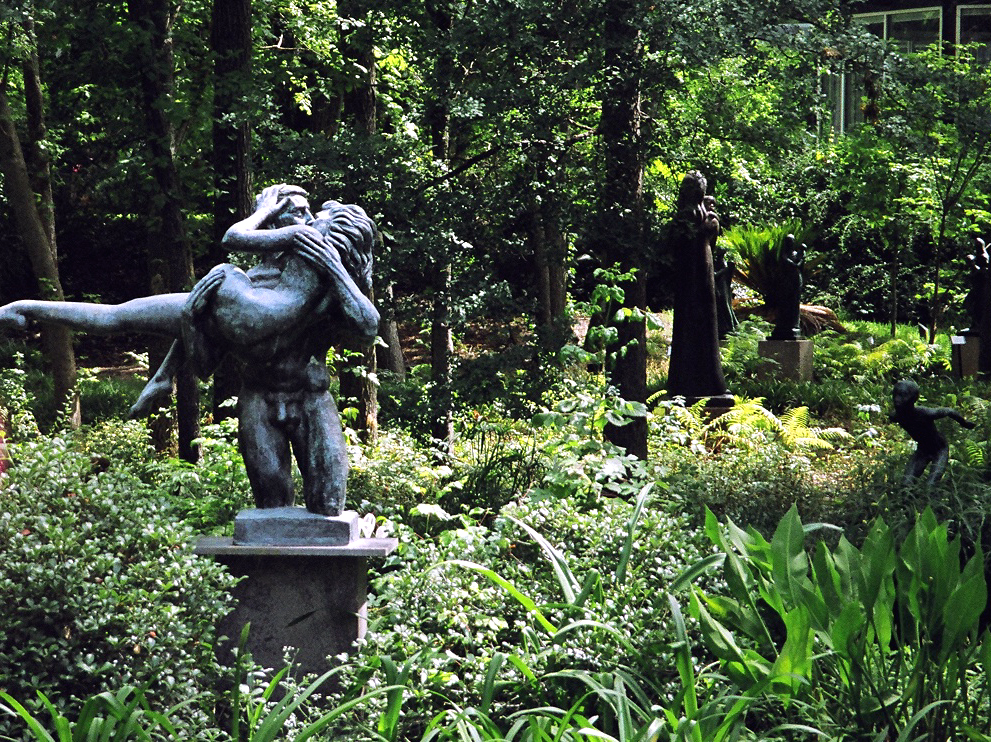
The Umlauf Sculpture Garden is located in the Zilker neighborhood.

Zilker is a neighborhood in south central Austin, Texas. It extends south of Lady Bird Lake, approximately bounded by the Union Pacific Railway to the southeast/south (Lamar Boulevard south of Oltorf), Barton Skyway to the south, Rabb Road and Azie Morton Road to the west and Lady Bird Lake to the north.

Directly northwest of Zilker is Barton Hills neighborhood, which connects back to Zilker Park via the Barton Creek Greenbelt.

== History ==
In 1918, Andrew Jackson Zilker deeded 35 acres (14 ha) surrounding Barton Springs to the City of Austin. The first homes in the Zilker area were constructed in the late 1920s.

Much of the west end of Zilker was owned by Vincent Canizzo until the late 1940s when the City of Austin, using eminent domain, forced him to sell the land on which Zilker Elementary currently sits. Shortly thereafter, the remaining land — from Ann Arbor Road to Rabb Road — was split into the Canizzo Subdivision.

In 2018, Robert E. Lee Road was changed to Azie Morton Road.

== Notable places ==
The Zilker Neighborhood is also home to many familiar Austin landmarks including the Umlauf Sculpture Garden, the historic Tex-Mex restaurant Matt's El Rancho as well as Barton Springs Pool, located in Zilker Park which hosts the Zilker Holiday Tree and Trail of Lights as well as the Austin City Limits Music Festival.
