= Bouldin Creek, Austin, Texas =

Neighborhood in Austin, Texas, United States of America

Coordinates: 30.249344°N 97.755253°W

Neighborhood map

Bouldin Creek is a neighborhood in Austin, Texas, originally created at the turn of the 20th century and saw the bulk of its growth in the 1920s and 1930s.

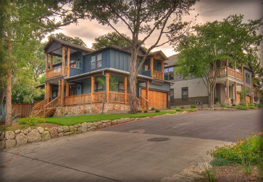
One of Bouldin Creek's homes

Bouldin Creek is bordered by South Congress to the east, the Union Pacific railroad track to the west, Barton Springs to the north, and West Oltorf to the south. It includes two major commercial areas, South First and South Congress.

The neighborhood has the Victorian mansion Green Pastures, which once belonged to Austinite John Henry Faulk, and the St. Anne African Methodist Episcopal Church (originally constructed in 1916) on Newton Street. The neighbourhood also contains the Texas School for the Deaf.

The Bouldin Creek Neighborhood Association arbitrates development and city initiatives with the neighborhood's residents.

The portion of Bouldin Creek north of Mary Street is located in city council District 9. The portion of Bouldin Creek south of Mary Street is located in city council District 3.
