= Violet Crown Trail =

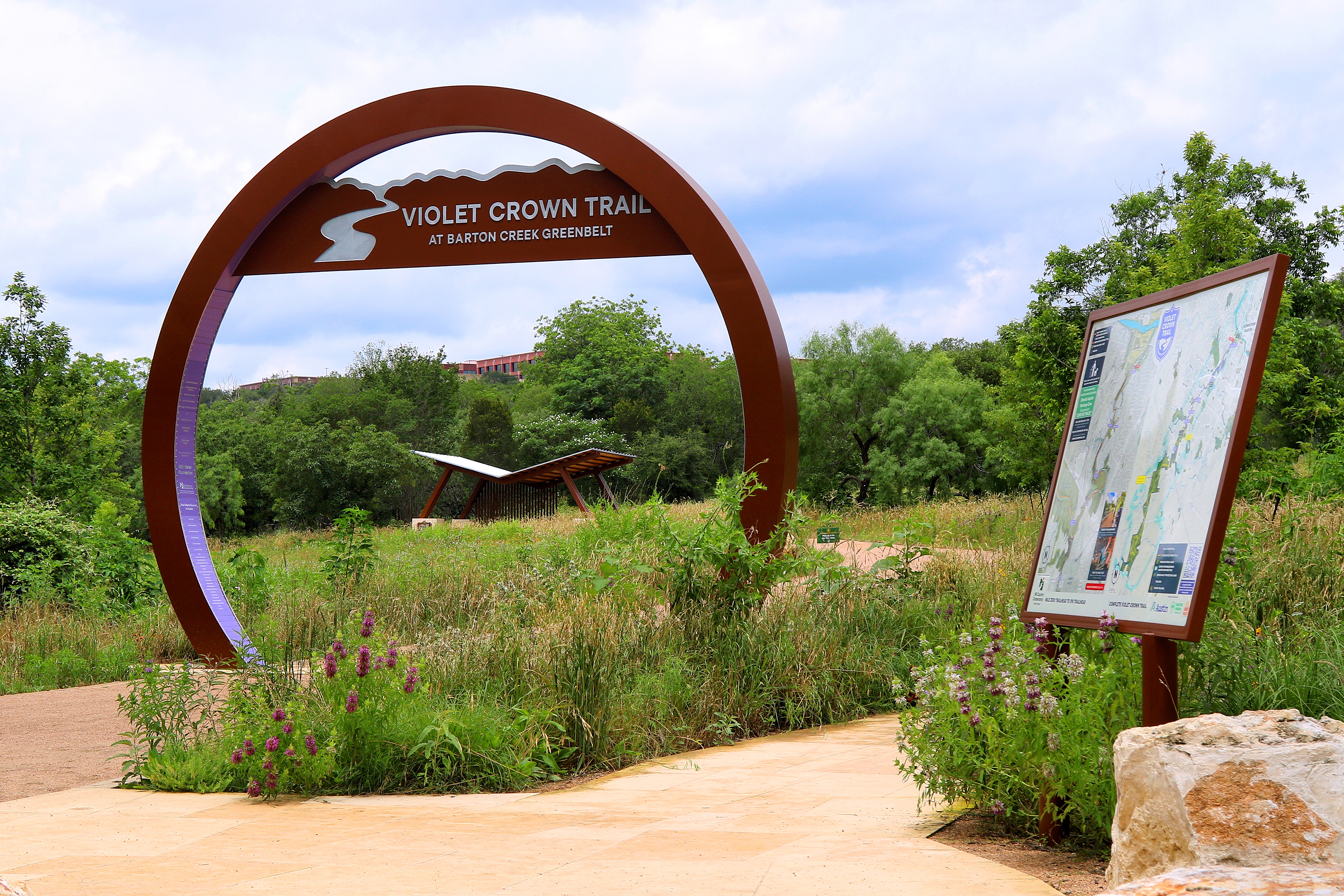
- The Violet Crown Trail Zilker Park Trailhead.
- Length: 30 mi (48 km)
- Established: 2006
- Trailheads: Zilker Park; 30°15′51″N 97°46′24″W; Lady Bird Johnson Wildflower Center; 30°11′09″N 97°52′14″W
- Hazards: Rattlesnakes

Trail map
- Map shows existing trails (blue), proposed trails (light purple) and trails that are in their design phase / under construction (red) as of November 2025

The Violet Crown Trail is a 30-mile (48 km) pedestrian and cycling trail in Austin, Texas. Established in 2006 by the Hill Country Conservancy, the trail follows Barton Creek from Zilker Park and Mopac Expressway southwestward before finally terminating at the Lady Bird Johnson Wildflower Center. The trail is mostly made of decomposed granite but has various links that are only suitable for hiking.

== Trailheads ==
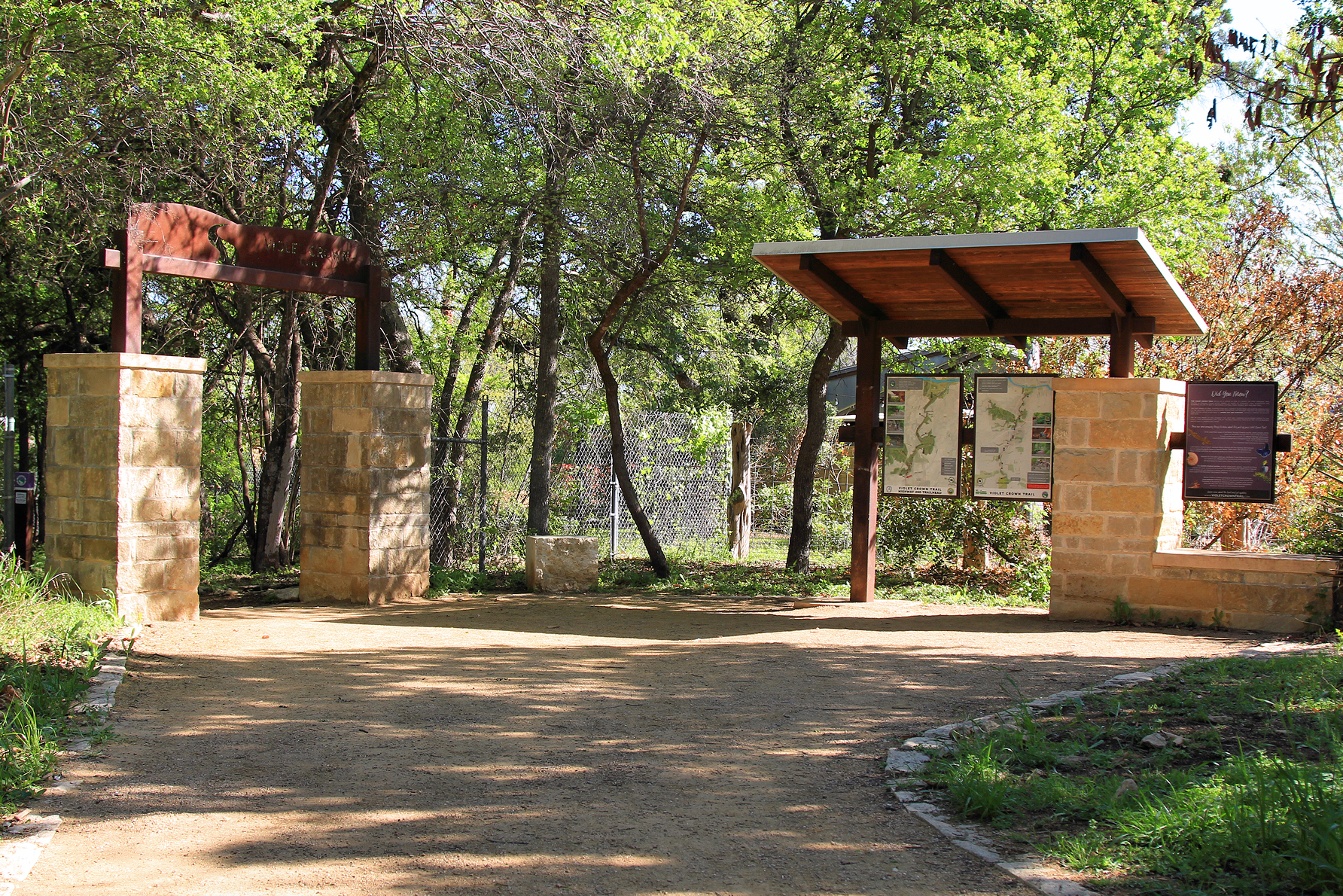
The Violet Crown Trail Highway 290 Trailhead in Sunset Valley.

- Barton Springs in Zilker Park, with connection to the Roy and Ann Butler Hike and Bike Trail encircling Lady Bird Lake
- Barton Creek Greenbelt, various trailheads along Spyglass Drive, Barton Skyway, SL 360, and Mopac Expressway
- Sunset Valley, various trailheads and on-street routes of the network
- Latta Drive/Whirlpool Cave, trailhead with a parking area at Latta Drive and Convict Hill Road
- Dick Nichols Park, access to the trail through the park loop trail
- Lady Bird Johnson Wildflower Center/The Veloway, primitive hiking trail runs traverses Slaughter Creek and ends at La Crosse Avenue

== Future expansion ==
Plans call for the Violet Crown Trail to extend from the Wildflower Center to the Onion Creek management area in Hays County. Construction of SH 45 in 2020 has already provided a connection for the trail to the SH 45 Trail running along the highway. Long-term plans call for an eventual extension to the city of San Marcos.
