= Andrew Jackson Zilker =

American politician and philanthropist (1858–1934)

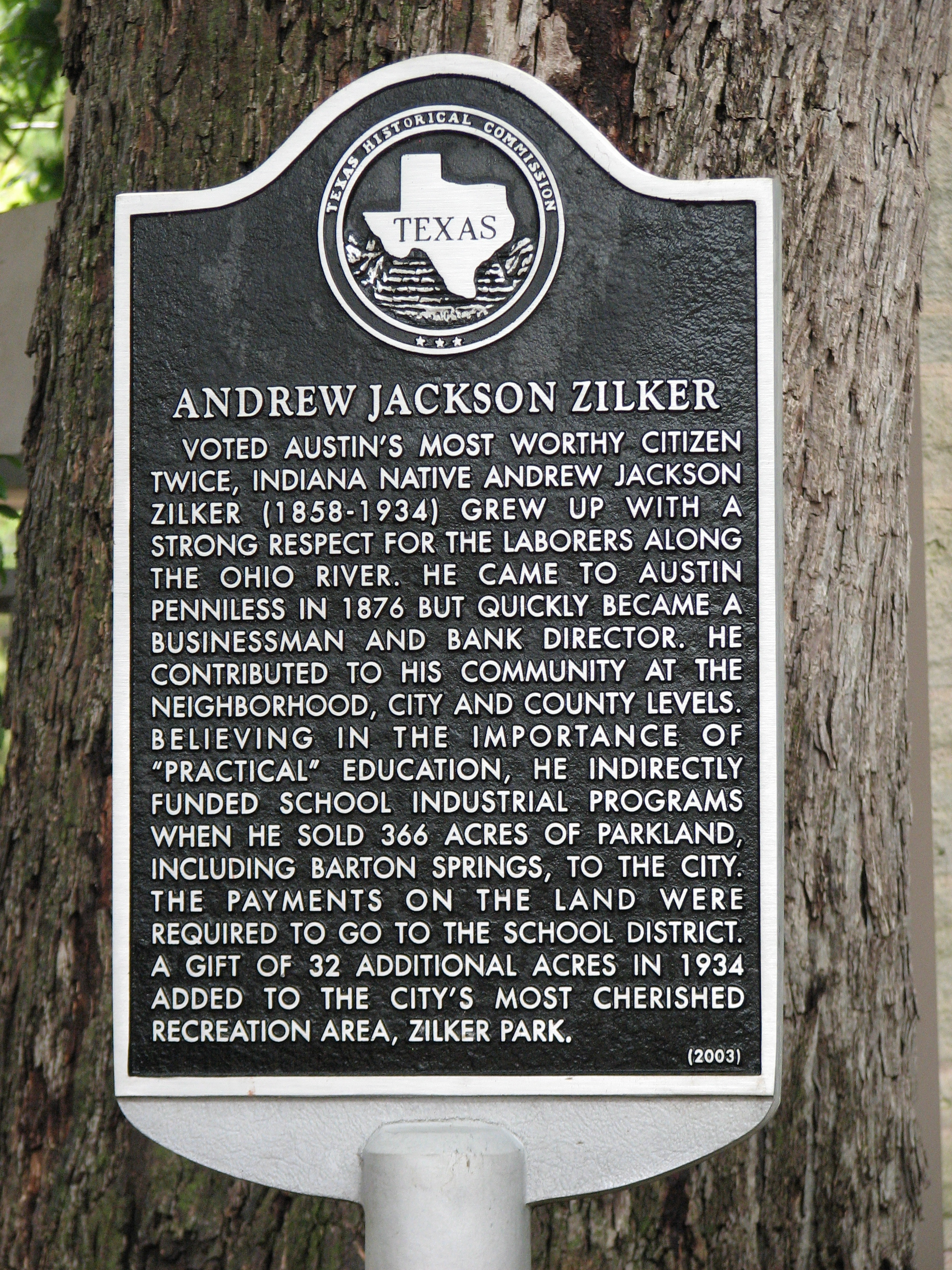
- This marker stands next to the Barton Springs marker on Barton Springs Drive in Zilker Park in front of the Pool House.

Personal details
- Born: 1858 New Albany, Indiana, United States
- Died: 1934 (aged 75–76)
- Occupation: Businessman, ice manufacturer

Andrew Jackson Zilker (1858–1934) was an American businessman, political figure and philanthropist. An Indiana native, Zilker settled and established his ice manufacturing business in Austin, Texas. He was a major benefactor of land in and around Austin; most notably he donated the land that eventually became Zilker Park to the city, which was later named in his honor. He was also the last private owner of Barton Springs, which today serves as a public recreational area.

== Biography ==
Andrew Zilker was born in New Albany, Indiana. In his youth he'd read Henderson King Yoakum's two-volume History of Texas, and was inspired to head for its capital to make his fortune. In 1876, at the age of 18, he arrived in Austin, where he acquired work as a dishwasher. His next job would be on the construction of the Congress Avenue Bridge. But the real money to be made in the Texas heat, he discovered, was in the manufacture of ice, and he quickly climbed the ladder from new hire to foreman for one icemaker in a matter of months. He was quick to learn the value of business connections, joining Austin Lodge #201 of the Benevolent and Protective Order of Elks shortly after its founding in 1891.

Soon he owned an ice plant of his own outright, and in 1901 began buying land between the Colorado River and Barton Creek. He had soon acquired 350 acres (1.4 km^{2}) surrounding Barton Springs, including the Springs themselves from John Rabb, and used the land to pasture the horses and mules that pulled his ice wagons, and the clear, clean Barton Springs water to make the ice itself. There he also built a small concrete pool and amphitheater for members of his Elks Club organization at the site of one of the three springs.

Zilker also found the time to be a volunteer fireman, Director of the First National Bank, Water and Light Commissioner, and served both as alderman from the old Tenth Ward and president of the Travis County School Board. He would own a variety of businesses, including a brickyard (perhaps to spite his rival neighbor, and brickmaker, Michael Butler), a wood and coal concern, and the water supply systems in Llano and Taylor. He also became the first Coca-Cola bottler in Austin.

The year was 1917 when, in his role as head of the school board, he cut a curious deal giving Barton Springs, and, over the next seventeen years, the surrounding acres, to the Public Free Schools of Austin (i.e. the school district) to sell to the city, which in turn paid for a $100,000 school endowment with the proceeds. This trust fund still pays for what is known today as the school-to-work program. In 1950, nearly two decades after Zilker's death, the district opened Zilker Elementary in his honor. The area itself became Zilker Metropolitan Park.

He is also remembered for his disdain for Austin mayor A. P. Wooldridge, and for encouraging Tom Miller to enter municipal politics and run for mayor in 1933.
