= Austin Trail of Lights =

Holiday Festival

The Austin Trail of Lights is an annual festival of lights and activities that takes place over two weeks each December in the downtown Zilker Park. Established in 1965, the Austin Trail of Lights is a longstanding holiday tradition in Central Texas with an estimated 400,000 attendees per year. The festival features more than 2 million holiday lights, illuminated displays, live entertainment, seasonal food and beverage vendors, visits with Santa, and the lighting of the Zilker Holiday Tree which was first lit in 1967. Admission includes both free community nights and paid ticketed evenings.

The Austin Trail of Lights is produced by the Trail of Lights Foundation, a nonprofit organization dedicated to preserving and operating the event for the Austin community. The event began in 1965 as a community holiday celebration known as the Yule Fest, organized by the Austin Parks and Recreation Department. Following financial challenges and the cancellation of the 2010 event, the newly formed Trail of Lights Foundation partnered with the City of Austin to revive and sustain the festival. The event returned in 2012 under nonprofit management with expanded fundraising, corporate sponsorships, and operational improvements (City Resolution No. 20230309-043).

Since its revival, attendance has grown significantly while maintaining a focus on affordability through multiple free admission nights each season. During the Covid-19 pandemic, the festival converted to a drive-thru in 2020 and 2021. Enjoying the lights is back to a walk-through and information is listed in many local media outlets.

Historic Trail of Lights Entrance
