= Moonlight towers (Austin, Texas) =

- Moonlight Towers
- U.S. National Register of Historic Places
- Recorded Texas Historic Landmark
- Texas State Antiquities Landmark
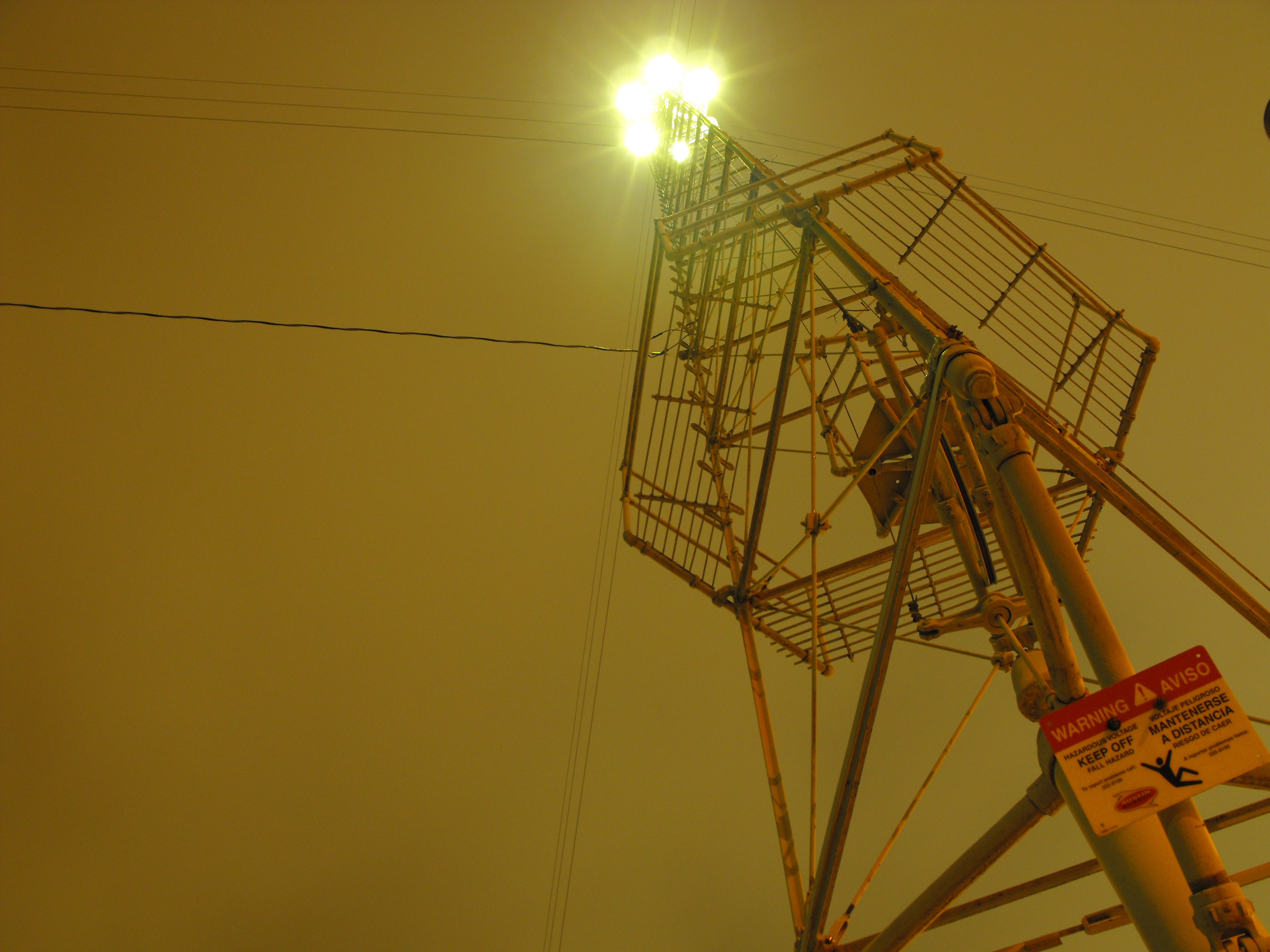
- A moonlight tower at night
- Location: Austin and vicinity
- Nearest city: Austin, Texas
- Built: 1894
- Architect: Fort Wayne Electric Co.
- Architectural style: Lighting Towers
- NRHP reference No.: 76002071
- RTHL No.: 6424
- TSAL No.: 627

Significant dates
- Added to NRHP: July 12, 1976
- Designated RTHL: 1970
- Designated TSAL: 5/28/1981

The moonlight towers in Austin, Texas, are the only known surviving moonlight towers in the world. They are 165 feet (50 m) tall and have a 15-foot (4.6 m) foundation. A single tower casts light from six carbon arc lamps, illuminating a 1,500-foot-radius (460 m) circle brightly enough to read a watch.

In 1970, the towers were recognized as Texas State Landmarks, followed by the 15 remaining towers being listed in the National Register of Historic Places on July 12, 1976. Only 6 are in their original locations as established by the Board of Public Works and City Council in 1895.

== History ==
In 1894, the City of Austin purchased 31 surplus towers from the City of Detroit, which was transitioning to street lighting. The towers were manufactured in Indiana by Fort Wayne Electric Company and assembled onsite. Some sources have claimed that Austin put up moonlight towers partially in response to the actions of the Servant Girl Annihilator, but the towers were not erected until 1894–1895, ten years after the murders.

When first erected, the towers were connected to electric generators at the Austin Dam, completed in 1893 on the site of present-day Tom Miller Dam. In the 1920s their original carbon-arc lamps, which were exceedingly bright but time-consuming to maintain, were replaced by incandescent lamps, which gave way in turn to mercury vapor lamps in the 1930s. The mercury vapor lamps were controlled by a switch at each tower's base. During World War II, a central switch was installed, allowing citywide blackouts in case of air raids.

In 1993, the city of Austin dismantled the towers and restored every bolt, turnbuckle and guy-wire as part of a $1.3 million project, the completion of which was celebrated in 1995 with a citywide festival. The City of Austin has ordinances in place to protect the towers from demolition. However, since 2004 the towers at 4th and Nueces, at 1st and Trinity, and at West 22nd St. and Nueces have all been removed to clear the way for new construction. It is unclear whether they will be dismantled or erected elsewhere.

== Tower locations ==
=== Surviving towers ===
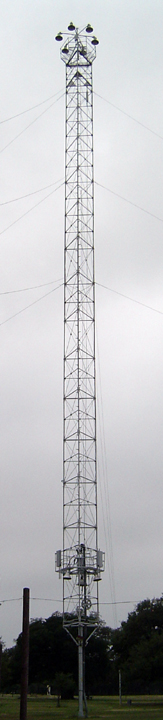
The moonlight tower in Zilker Park

There are 15 surviving towers kept in original condition except for a historic plaque on each tower.

- West 9th and Guadalupe St (SE corner)
- W. 12th St. and Blanco St (SE corner)
- W. 12th St. and Rio Grande St (NW corner)
- W. 15th St. and San Antonio St (SW corner)
- W. 41st St. and Speedway St (SW corner)
- Zilker Park (used for Zilker Holiday Tree) (moved from Emma Long Metropolitan Park)
- Martin Luther King Jr. Blvd. and Chicon St (SE corner)
- E. 13th St. and Coleto St (NE corner)
- Pennsylvania Ave. and Leona St (NE corner)
- E. 11th St. and Trinity St (SE corner)
- E. 11th St. and Lydia St (SE corner)
- Canterbury St. and Lynn St. (NE corner)
- Leland St. and Eastside Dr (SE corner)
- Monroe St. and S. 1st S (SW corner)

=== Dismantled towers ===
- East 1st St. and Waller St.
- East 6th St. and Medina St.
- E. 14th St. and Sabine St
- E. 14th St. and Sabine St (SW corner)
- Hawthorne (which later became either E. 20th or E. 21st) and Longfellow.
- Martin Luther King Jr. Blvd. (was 19th St.) and Lavaca St.
- E. 16th St. and Brazos St.
- E. 2nd St. and Neches St. (Convention Center)
- W. 6th St. and Westlynn St
- Dean Keeton St. (was 26th St.) and Whitis Ave.
- E. 5th St. and Brazos St. (moved to Leland St. and East Side Dr.)
- 29th St. and Lamar Blvd.
- W. 6th St. and Lamar Blvd.
- City Park renamed to Emma Long Metropolitan Park (moved to Zilker Park)
- North end of Granite Dam (near power station and Ben Hur dock)
- East Cesar Chavez Street and Trinity St. (SW corner)
- West 4th and Nueces (SW corner)

== In popular culture ==
The Zilker Park tower was prominently featured in the film Dazed and Confused (1993) as the site of a high-school keg party, in which the character David Wooderson played by Matthew McConaughey exclaims, "Party at the moon tower."

This place used to be off limits, man, 'cause some drunk freshman fell off. He went right down the middle, smacking his head on every beam, man. I hear it doesn't hurt after the first couple though. Autopsy said he had one beer, how many did you have?

— Ron Slater, Dazed and Confused

The scenes were actually filmed at a mock-up of a tower, which was erected at Walter E. Long Park east of Austin. Both the base and top of the tower shown in the movie differed greatly from those of the real towers.

There is a band called Moonlight Towers from Austin.

The Moontower Comedy Festival at the Paramount Theater in Austin is named after the Moontowers.

Mention of the towers were also in adult cartoon Rick and Morty (S3E6 Rest and Ricklaxation), where Toxic Rick uses a moontower as a conductor for an experiment.
