= Barton Springs Pool =

Outdoor swimming pool in the United States

Coordinates: 30.26390°N 97.77000°W

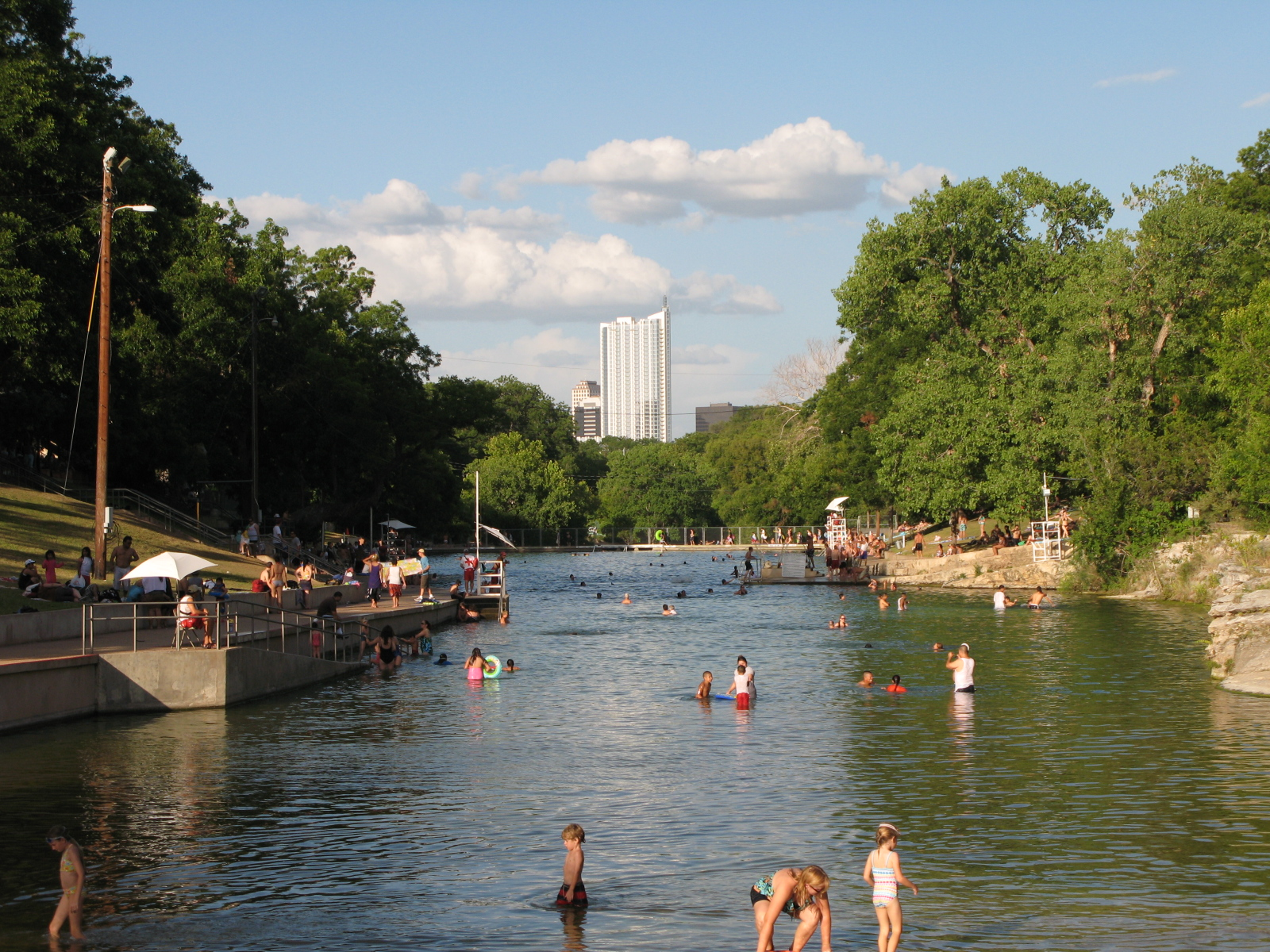
Barton Springs Pool in Austin, Texas.

Barton Springs Pool is a recreational outdoor swimming pool in Austin, Texas, that is filled entirely by natural springs connected to the Edwards Aquifer. Located in Zilker Park, the pool exists within the channel of Barton Creek and uses water from Main Barton Spring, the fourth-largest spring in Texas. The pool is a popular venue for year-round swimming, as its temperature hovers between about 68 °F (20 °C) and 74 °F (23 °C) year-round. The pool's grassy hills are lined with mature shade trees.

== History ==
Native American Coahuiltecan descendants include Barton Springs among the four springs part of their creation story dating to prehistoric times; these springs are Comal Springs, Barton Springs, San Marcos Springs and San Antonio Springs.

Spanish explorers discovered the springs in the 17th century, and around 1730 erected temporary missions at the site (later moving to San Antonio).

In 1837, before the incorporation of the city of Austin, the area was settled by William ("Uncle Billy") Barton, who named three springs after his daughters: Parthenia, Eliza, and Zenobia. He and subsequent owners of the property recognized its value as a tourist attraction, and promoted it vigorously, thus leading to the swimming hole's lasting popularity.

The last private owner of the property, Andrew Jackson Zilker, deeded it to Austin in 1918. During the 1920s, the city undertook a construction project to create a larger swimming area by damming the springs and building sidewalks. The bathhouse was designed in 1947 by Dan Driscoll (who also designed the bathhouse at Deep Eddy Pool) and Delmar Groos in the Streamline Moderne style.

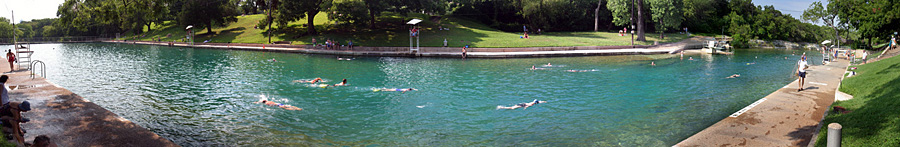

== Operation of the pool ==
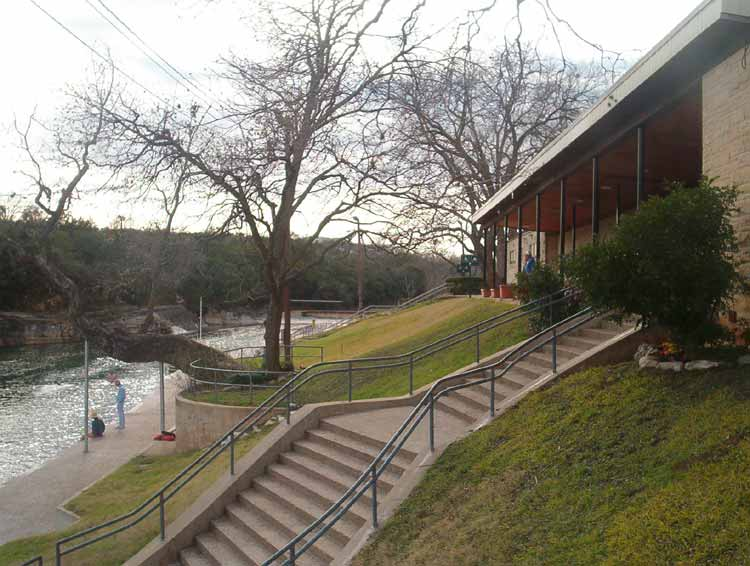
Stairs leading to Barton Springs Pool

The pool is open to the public every day except Thursday from 5 a.m. to 10 p.m. The pool is closed on Thursday from 9 a.m. to 7 p.m. for cleaning. Guarded swim hours run from 8 a.m. to 10 p.m. on regular operating days and from 7 p.m. to 10 p.m. on Thursdays. Admission is charged by age group and residency, with free admission for infants under one year old and honorably discharged veterans. There is a free section outside of the complex that locals frequent that is separated by a fence, nicknamed "Barking Springs."

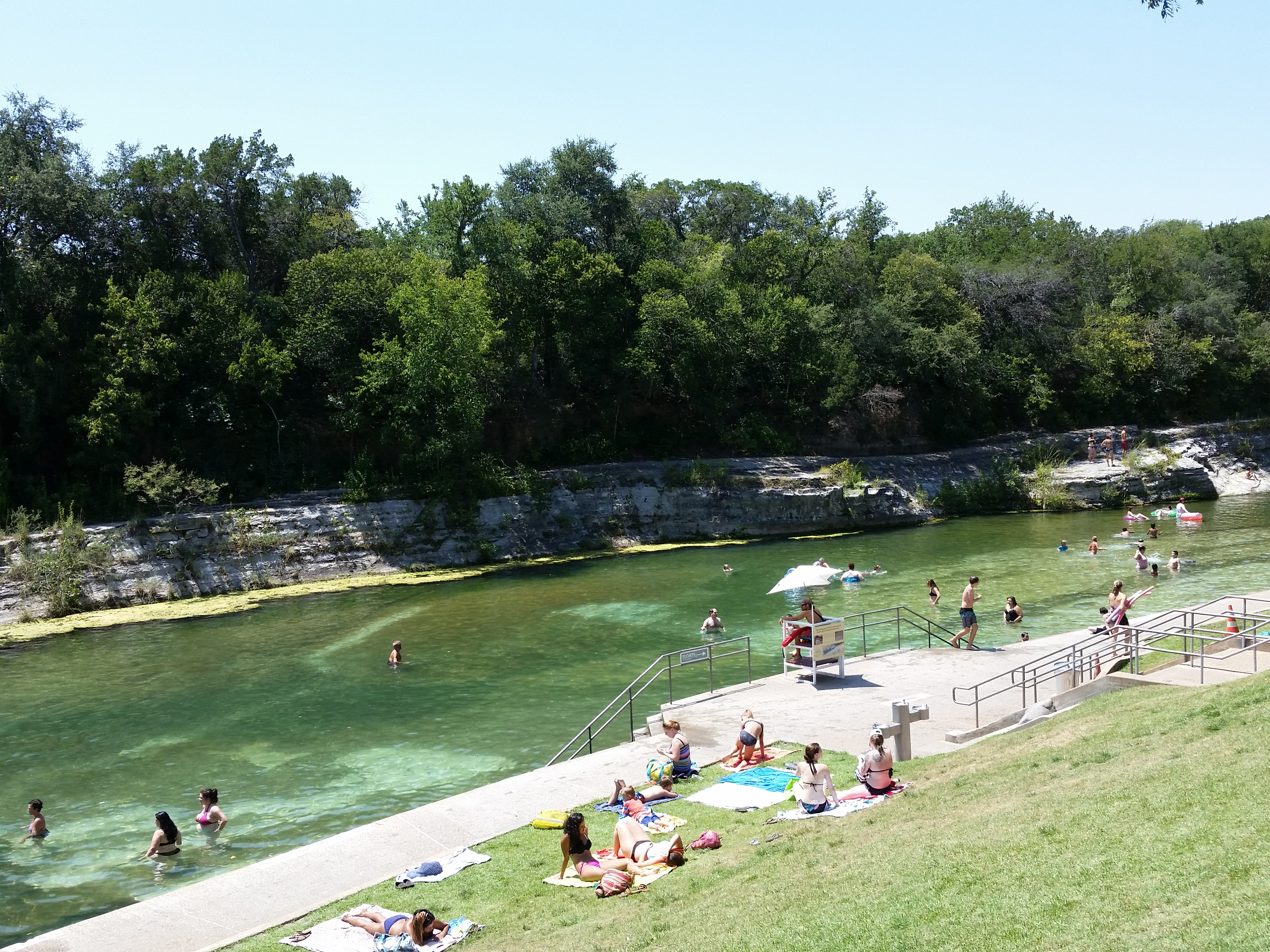
Barton Springs Pool

Prohibited items include

- Alcohol
- Food
- Pets
- Coolers, ice chests, or thermal bags
- Glass
- Frisbees, footballs, soccer balls or other hard balls
- Portable speakers
- Tobacco – smoking of any kind is not allowed

Anyone seen smoking or with an open container of alcohol will be asked to leave or denied entry.

Flotation devices are permitted at either end of the pool, but not in the middle section.

When open for swimming, the floodgates on the pool's dam are closed, and Main Barton Spring fills the pool to a maximum depth of about 18 feet. At the upper end of the pool, another dam prevents surface water from Barton Creek from entering the pool by diverting it through a tunnel under the sidewalks.

On Thursdays, the pool is closed for cleaning from 9 a.m. until 7 p.m. The floodgates are sometimes partially opened, lowering the water level in the pool by several feet. Employees then buff or blast pressured water against the limestone bottom of the pool's shallow end, as well as the steps and ramps leading into the water, in order to wash away the hazardous and slippery algae buildup. In the deep end, a fire hose is used to push debris toward the downstream dam. Overgrown vegetation is also trimmed on cleaning days. The pool is closed for several weeks once a year for more extensive cleaning.

The pool is closed during flash flood warnings as Barton Creek may flood and overflow the diversion dam. Swimming in Barton Springs Pool is then unsafe, as it transforms into a raging creek. The pool is then closed for several days after a flood, so mud and debris that washed into the pool can be removed. Other unplanned reasons for pool closure include lightning or thunder in the area, "search and rescue" situations, serious medical emergencies, high fecal coliform count, and chemical spills (either inside the pool itself or over the Barton Springs segment of the Edwards Aquifer).

== Environmental issues ==
The pool has been closed to the public a number of times since the 1980s due to unsafe levels of fecal coliform (E. coli) bacteria in its waters. The source of contamination is still undetermined: many point to upstream urban development as the cause, although others note that high bacteria levels were seen in the 1950s, when development was less pervasive. Contamination is usually worse after heavy rains due to the flushing of the effluent of upstream subdivisions into the Edwards Aquifer recharge zone which feeds the springs.

The environmental conditions of the springs gave birth to a local political movement called the Save Our Springs Alliance (SOS). SOS became a force in Austin municipal politics, leading to many "green" initiatives involving environmental issues in addition to those of the springs.

Robert Redford, who first learned to swim at Barton Springs Pool, has also been an outspoken ally. In 2007 he and Terrence Malick co-produced The Unforeseen, a documentary highlighting environmental impact to the Edwards aquifer from the surrounding real estate subdivision.

Another environmental issue involving the springs and the pool emerged with the discovery of the Barton Springs salamander, a federally listed endangered or threatened species which only exists in the pool and a few surrounding environs. After some debate, and studies by the city of Austin, Texas state agencies, and the U.S. Fish and Wildlife Service, it was determined that swimmers and salamanders could co-exist (as they had probably been doing for some time).

The pool was also closed in 2003 after a cover story in a local paper claimed that the waters were toxic. After closing the pool for 90 days, officials from the CDC, USEPA, State of Texas and the City of Austin deemed it safe for swimmers. The source of the chemicals entering the pool were from a pavement sealer used on a nearby local parking lot. This discovery led to the nation's first ban of coal tar pavement sealers in 2005.
