= Barton Creek Greenbelt =

Public park in Austin, Texas

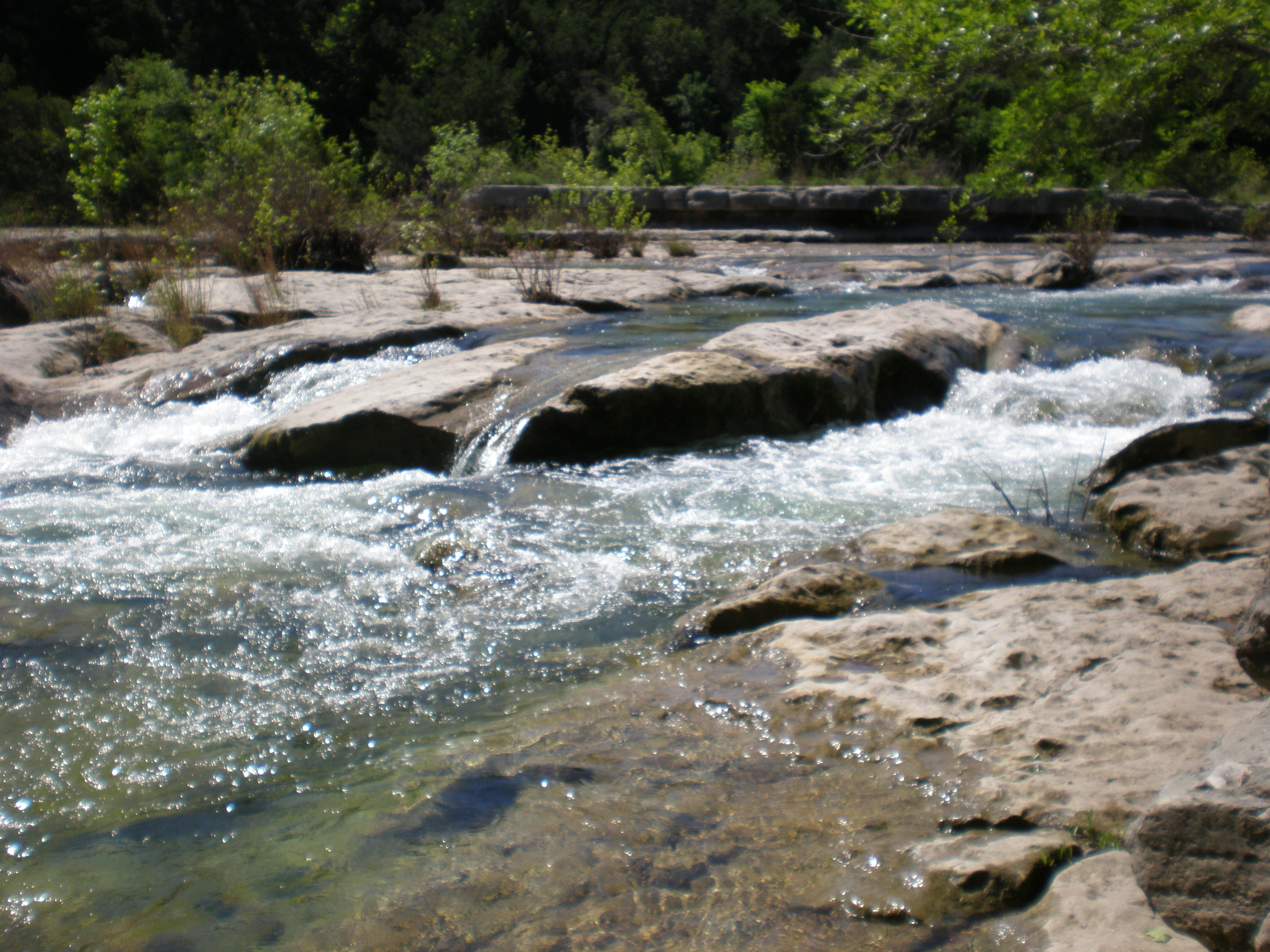
- The Greenbelt in April
- Location: Travis County, Texas, U.S.
- Nearest city: Austin, Texas
- Coordinates: 30°14′38″N 97°48′35″W
- Established: 1974
- Governing body: City of Austin Parks and Recreation

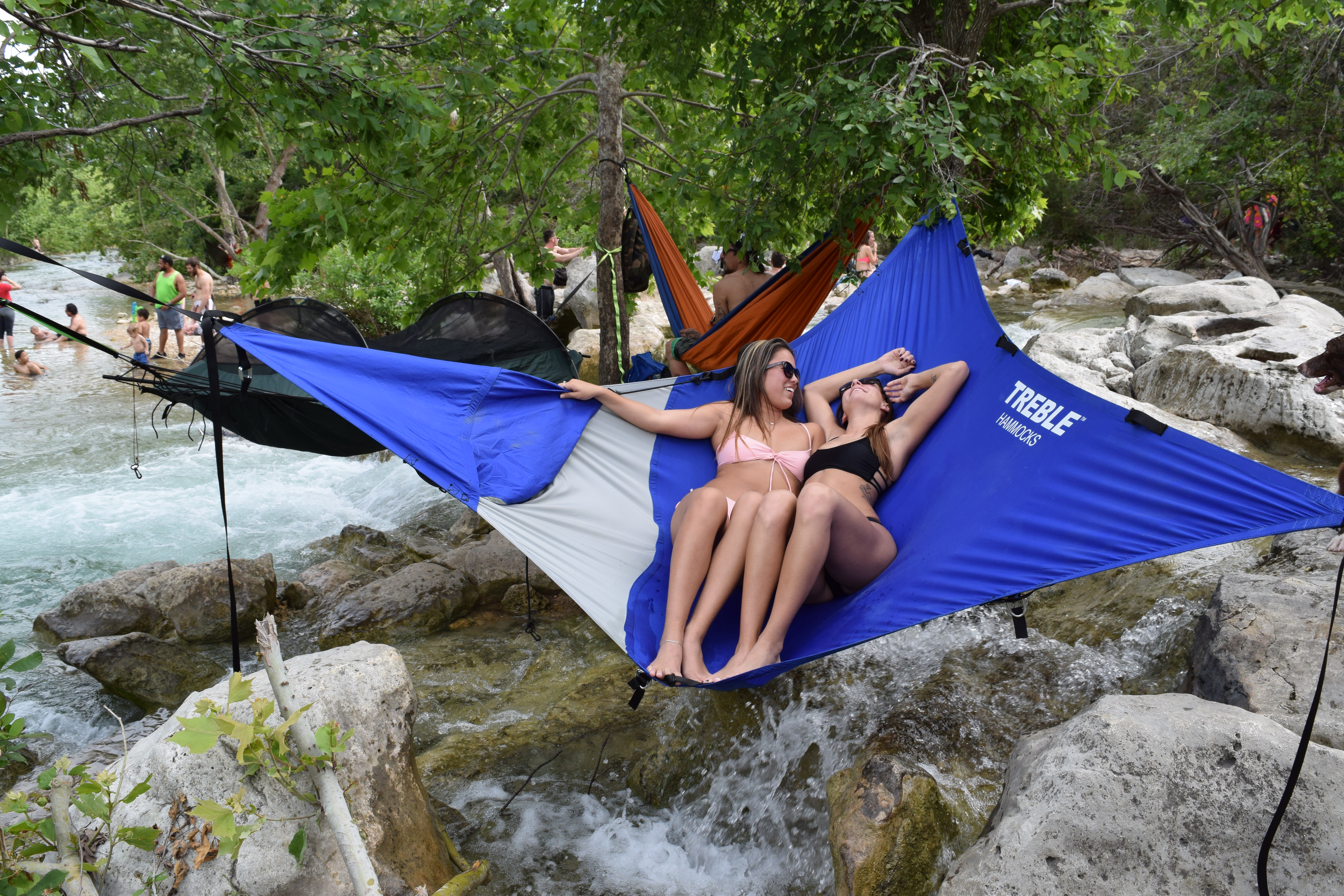
Twin Fall Hammocks on the Greenbelt

The Barton Creek Greenbelt in Austin, Texas is managed by the City of Austin's Park and Recreation Department. The Greenbelt is a 7.25-mile (11.67 km) stretch of public land spanning from Zilker Park west to the Lost Creek neighborhood. The Barton Creek Greenbelt runs parallel to the first 6.5 miles of Barton Creek before ending on a steep .75 mile hill commonly referred to as the hill of life. The Barton Creek Greenbelt consists of three areas: the Barton Creek Wilderness Park, the Upper Greenbelt, and the Lower Greenbelt. It is characterized by large limestone cliffs, dense foliage, and shallow bodies of water.

== Climate ==
Located in Austin, Texas, the Barton Creek Greenbelt has a humid subtropical climate characterized by hot summers and mild winters. The Greenbelt receives 30 to 35 inches (760 to 890 mm) of rain annually, with the majority of the precipitation coming in the spring and the second highest in the fall. Small bodies of water can be found at all times of the year throughout the Greenbelt; however, the creek bed that runs along the spine of the Greenbelt actively flows only 1 to 2 months out of the year depending on precipitation levels. The Barton Creek tributary feeding the Colorado River contributes to the area's highly concentrated vegetation.

== Sports and recreation ==
With its diverse terrain, the Greenbelt is a popular location for adventure-loving locals. The large limestone cliffs that line portions of the Greenbelt make for excellent rock climbing. Hikers and bikers can be found year-round, although during the wet season mountain biking is more challenging as the biking trails crisscross the creek bed, making it difficult to cross when it is full. However, the addition of a pedestrian bridge east of MoPac Expressway facilitated moving between the sides. During years of heavy rainfall the water level of the creek rises high enough to allow swimming, cliff diving, kayaking, and tubing. During the annual "Tubin' the Belt" parade in the Spring hundreds of individuals tube the Greenbelt.

Adjacent to Barton Creek Greenbelt is a popular site for cavers: Airmen's Cave, which, at two miles (3 km), is the longest cave in Travis County. After many novice spelunkers became lost exploring the cave and required rescue, the entrance to the cave was sealed by a locked steel grate. Airmen's Cave has scheduled openings for guided exploration arranged with Austin area spelunking organizations.

== History ==
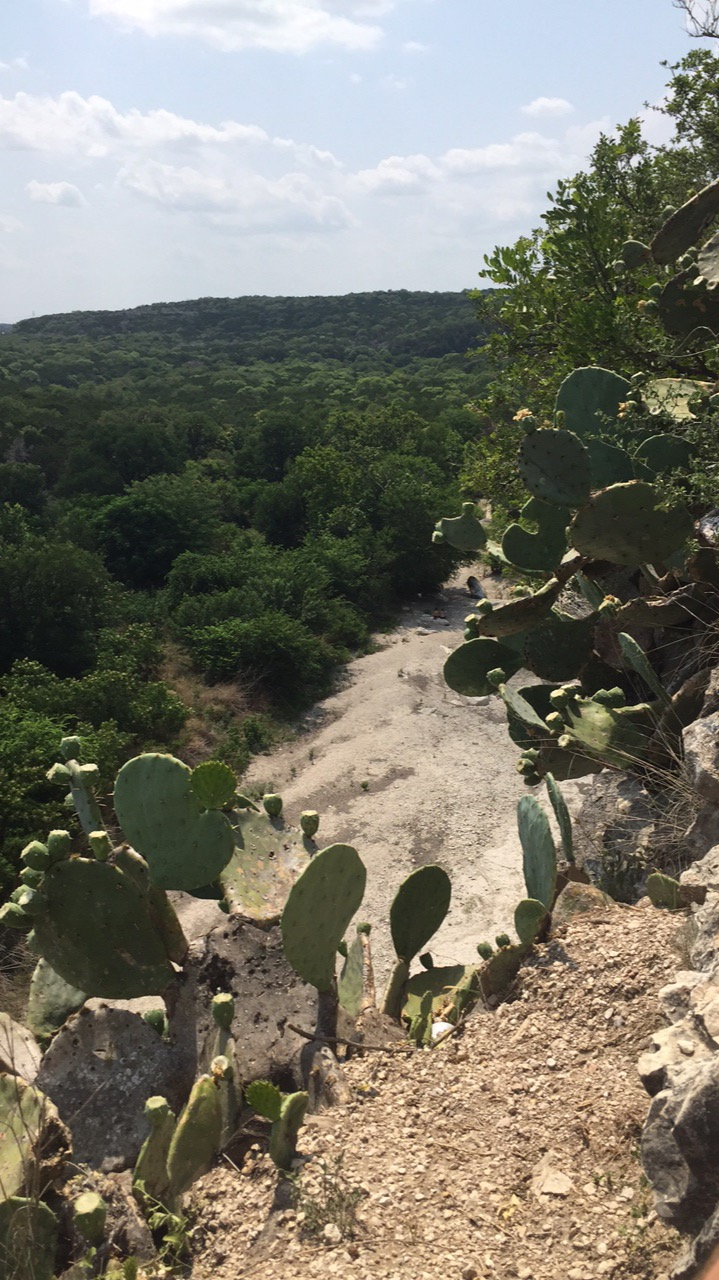
The Greenbelt near Gus Fruh Pool during a drought.

William Barton gave his name to the creek that created the Greenbelt when he settled on its banks in 1837.

On September 7, 1974, the Bradfield-Cummins real estate firm sold 132.34 acres to the City of Austin for parkland. Another 0.88-acre parcel was purchased July 24, 1982.

The trail running along the Greenbelt has an interesting history. For example, the westernmost section, called "The Hill of Life," formerly was closed. The residents in the subdivision at the top of the hill had arranged with the Parks & Recreation Department to keep it closed. However, John Hartman orchestrated a meeting with the Parks and Recreation board to get that portion opened, prevailing after lining up at least 10 major neighborhood groups to argue against the special deal.

During the 1970s and 1980s, hikers had to find ways over, under, and around the fences placed to keep them from accessing the creek's cool clear water and free swimming holes. The initial Greenbelt "River Rats" made it clear to all users:

"you carried the trash in...you carry the trash out! Don't let your trash mess up our clear creeks and rivers!"

In March 2009, The Trust for Public Land donated 14 acres (5.7 ha) of land to the Greenbelt, in addition to the 44 acres (18 ha) they donated in early 2007. Previously, between 1992 and 1999, TPL purchased nearly 1,000 acres of land in the Barton Creek watershed and donated it to the city, transforming a thin stretch of public land into a major metropolitan park. The organization hoped to continue expansion of the trail network in the area in coming years.

== Maintenance ==
In 2011, the City of Austin's maintenance team, assisted by five AmeriCorps members from American YouthWorks Texas Conservation Corps, completed over 100 projects throughout the Greenbelt in erosion control, habitat restoration, and GIS mapping. The crew was funded through donations by Impact Austin, Austin Parks Foundation, and Hill Country Conservancy. Other nonprofits, including Greenbelt Guardians, Central Texas Mountaineers, and the Austin Ridgeriders also play a big role in volunteer maintenance. Many of these agencies come together to organize a major volunteer day, National Trails Day, every year on the first Saturday in June.

== Locations ==
Popular Barton Creek Greenbelt locations include: Twin Falls, Campbell's Hole, The Flats, Gus Fruh, and Sculpture Falls.
