= Zilker Park =

Historic urban park in Austin, Texas

- Zilker Metropolitan Park
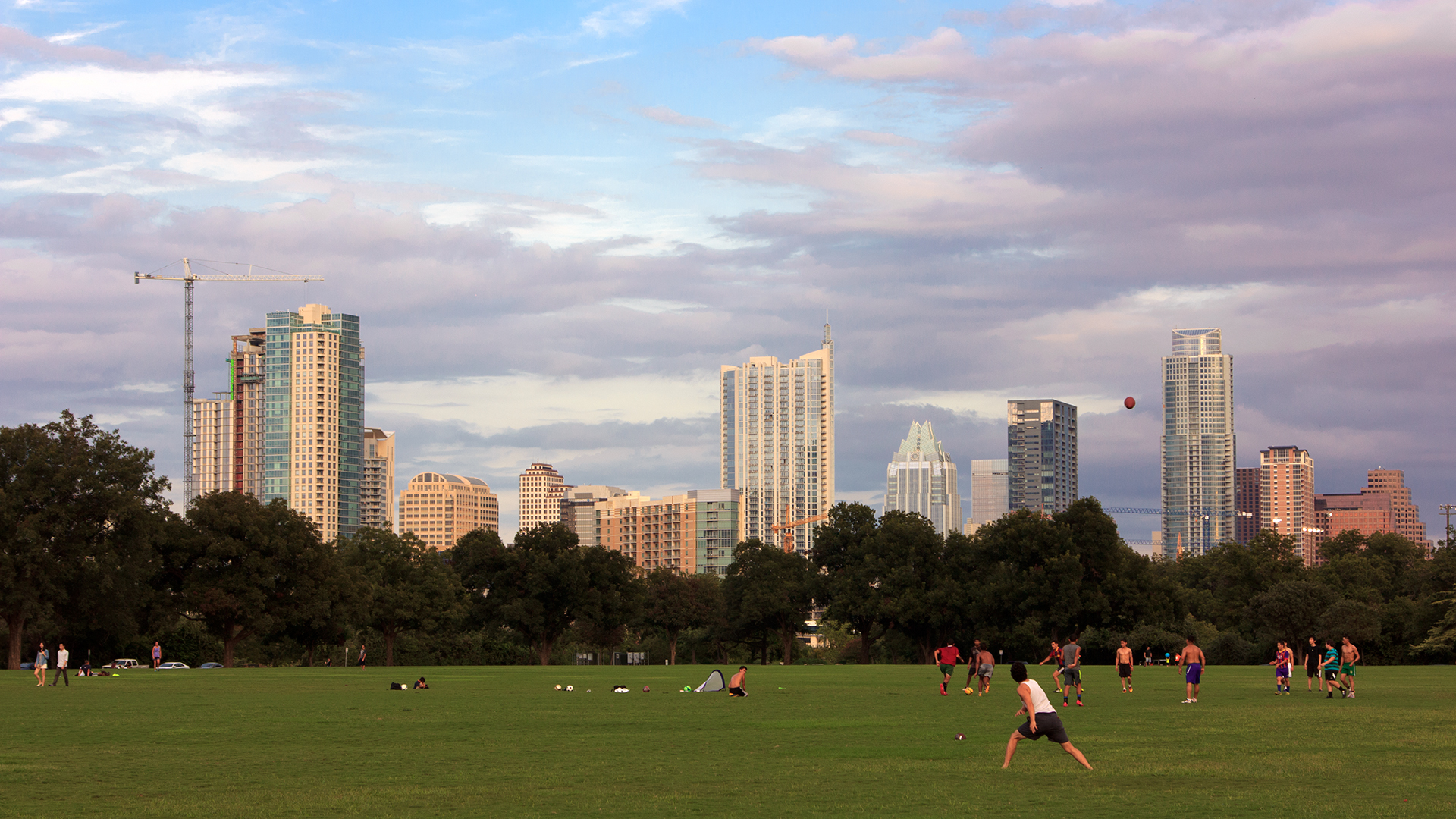
- Austin skyline from Zilker Park
- Interactive map of Zilker Park
- Area: 350 acres (140 ha)
- Operator: Austin Parks and Recreation Department
- Zilker Park Historic District
- U.S. National Register of Historic Places
- U.S. Historic district
- Location within Texas Location within the United States
- Location: Austin, Texas
- Coordinates: 30°15′49″N 97°46′36″W
- Built: 1917
- Architect: Charles H. Page, Fred A. Dale
- Architectural style: Moderne
- NRHP reference No.: 97000479
- Added to NRHP: May 23, 1997

Zilker Metropolitan Park is a recreational area in south Austin, Texas, at the juncture of Barton Creek and the Colorado River that comprises over 350 acres (142 ha) of publicly owned land. It is named after its benefactor, Andrew Jackson Zilker, who donated the land to the city in 1917. The land was developed into a park during the Great Depression in the 1930s. Today the park serves as a hub for many recreational activities and the hike and bike trail around Lady Bird Lake, both of which run next to the park. The large size of the park makes it a capable venue for large-scale events such as the Austin City Limits Music Festival and the Zilker Park Kite Festival. The park was listed in the National Register of Historic Places in 1997.

== History ==
The land surrounding Barton Springs was claimed by its namesake, William Barton, in the 1830s for his cattle ranch. In the 1860s it was acquired by the Rabb family, who operated mills on Barton Creek. In the early twentieth century Andrew Jackson Zilker bought a 350-acre (140 ha) plot of land between the Colorado River and Barton Creek, including the Springs, and used the spring water in his ice-making business. Zilker sold his land to the City of Austin in a series of sales in 1917, 1923 and 1931; he donated the proceeds of the sale to a trust dedicated to funding Austin's public schools.

In the 1930s the city transformed the ranch into a space for public recreation, building park amenities and buildings with help from the Civil Works Administration. Barton Springs Pool was given a concrete dam and an enlarged swimming area. In 1934 the park was named Zilker Metropolitan Park, after its donor and patron.

== Attractions ==
In addition to general-purpose lawns, sports fields, cross country courses, historical markers, concession stands and picnic areas, the park includes numerous public attractions. The Zilker Botanical Garden features several independently maintained gardens located near the center of the park and hosts the Zilker Gardens Festival every spring. The Austin Nature & Science Center offers ecological exhibits, nature hike trails, and children's educational programming. The Umlauf Sculpture Garden adjoins the southeast end of the park, displaying sculptural works by artist Charles Umlauf and others. The Zilker Hillside Theater hosts regular performances by local theatre companies, including free "Shakespeare in the Park" every May and an annual summer musical. Barton Springs Pool adjoins the park on the east, offering public swimming; other water activities are available in Barton Creek. The Beverly S. Sheffield Education Center by Barton Springs Pool offers exhibits about the natural history of the Edwards Aquifer that feeds Barton Springs. Every winter the 155-foot (47 m) Zilker Holiday Tree is illuminated, along with a Trail of Lights display. The Zilker Zephyr 12 in (305 mm) gauge miniature railway carries passengers on a tour around the park. It opened in 1961 and ran until 2019. In 2019, it closed down due to erosion. It has been reopened as of August 2023 as Zilker Eagle.

The park's amenities and wide, open spaces allow it to host a variety of large events each year—notably, the Austin City Limits Music Festival, which fills the park for two weekends each fall with numerous live musical performances by prominent country, folk and rock artists, among others.

== Trails ==
- Roy and Ann Butler Trail encircling Lady Bird Lake
- Violet Crown Trail runs south from Barton Springs Pool to Lady Bird Johnson Wildflower Center

== Gallery ==
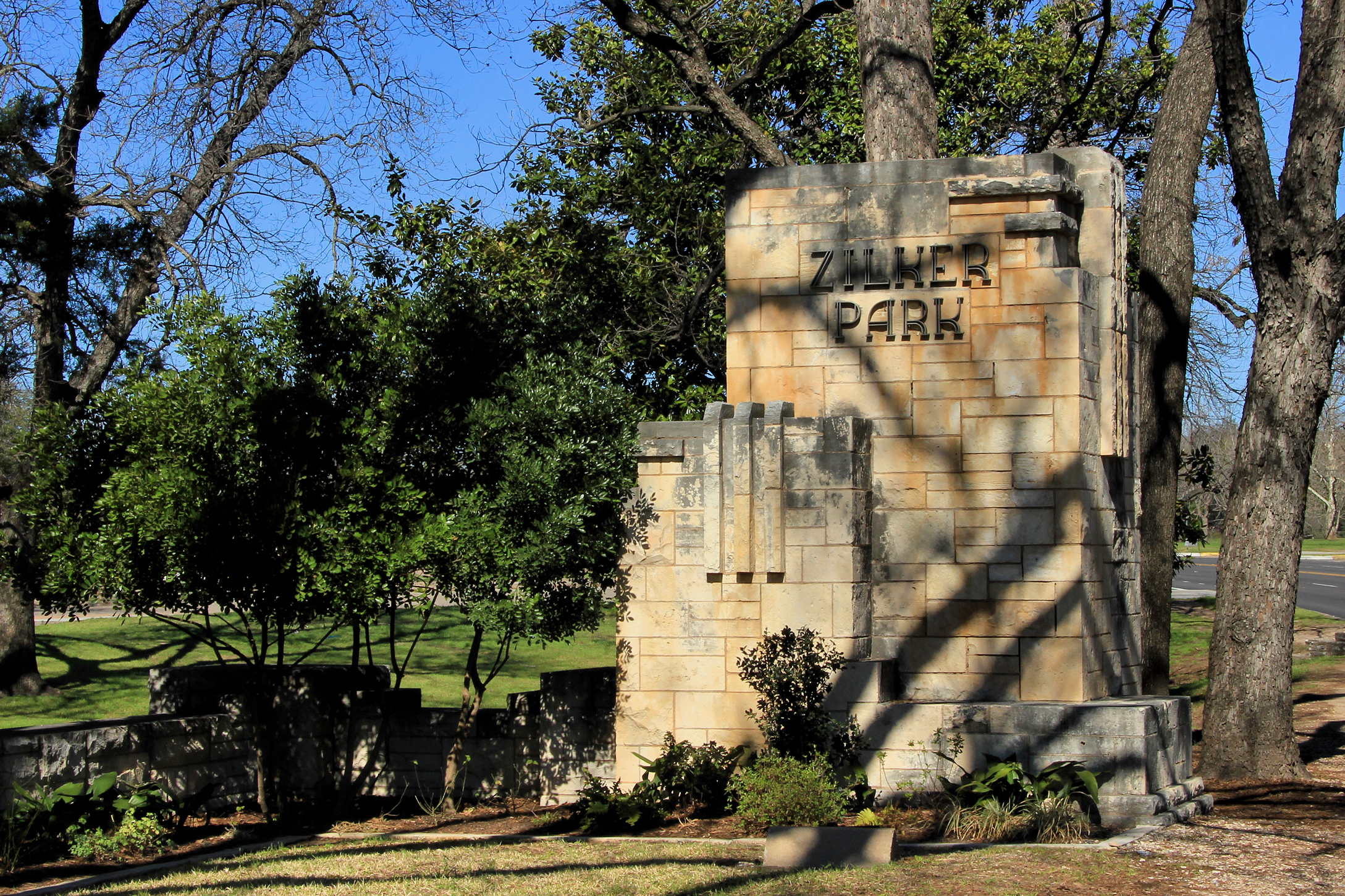
East entrance

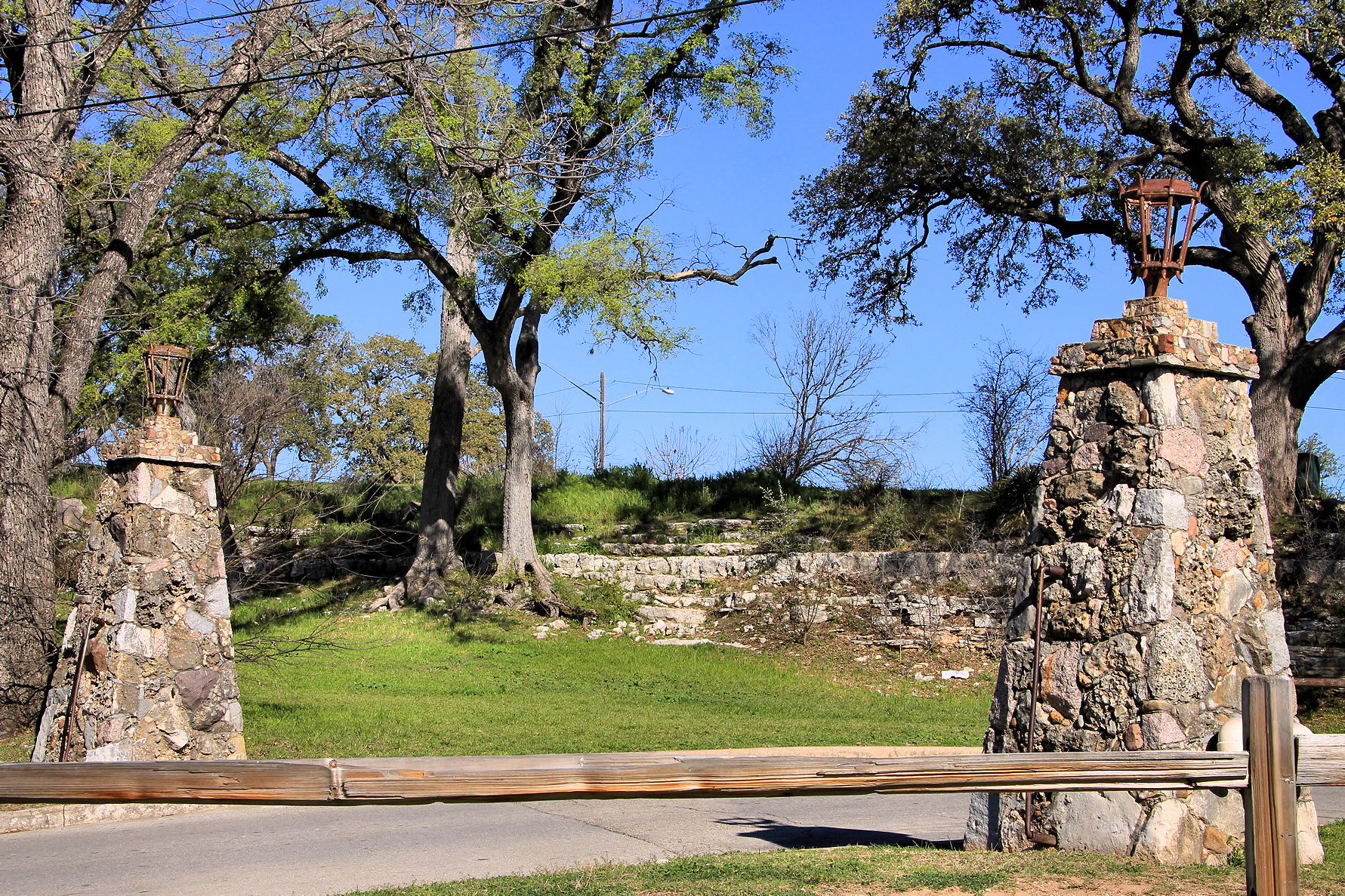
Pool entrance

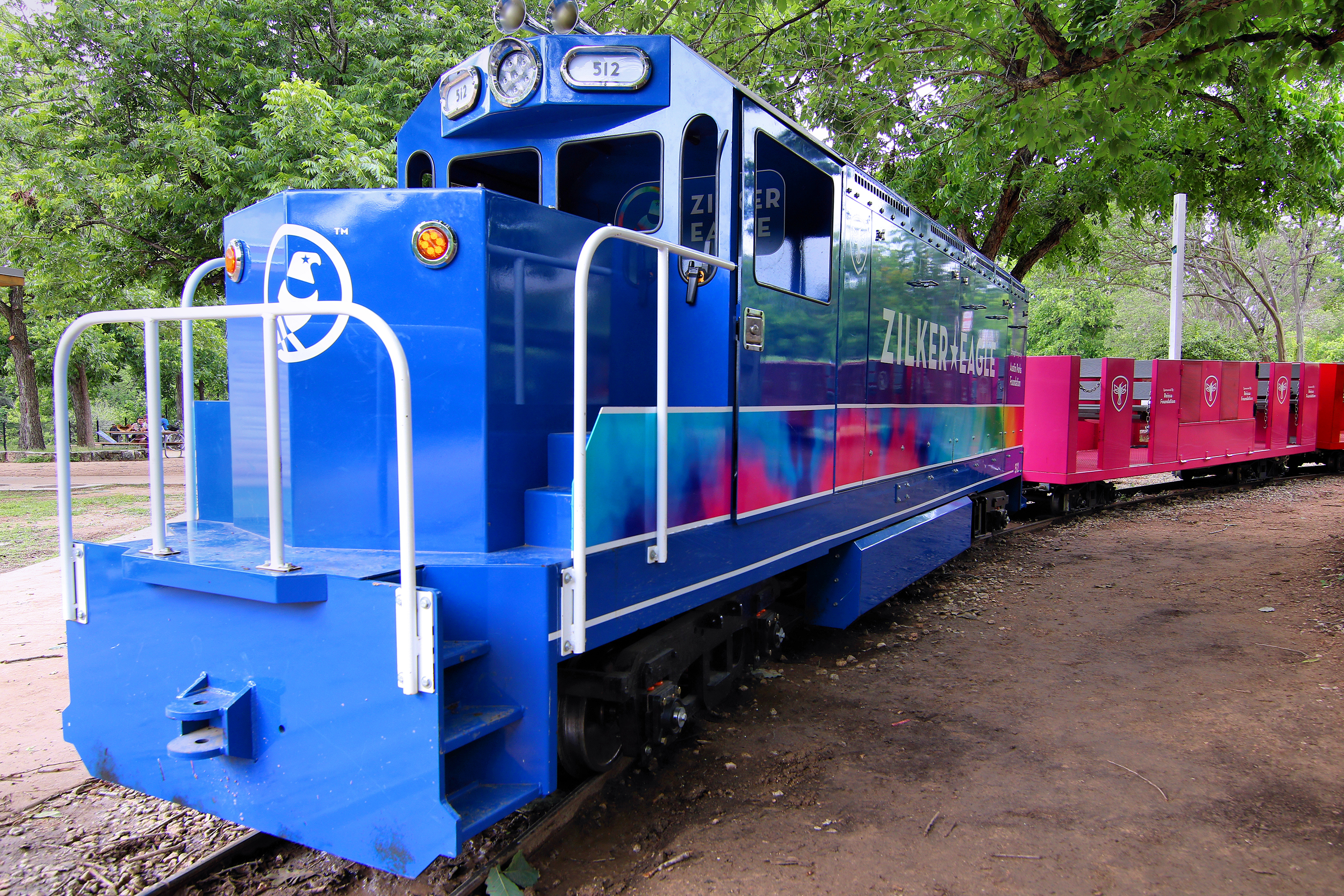
Zilker Eagle

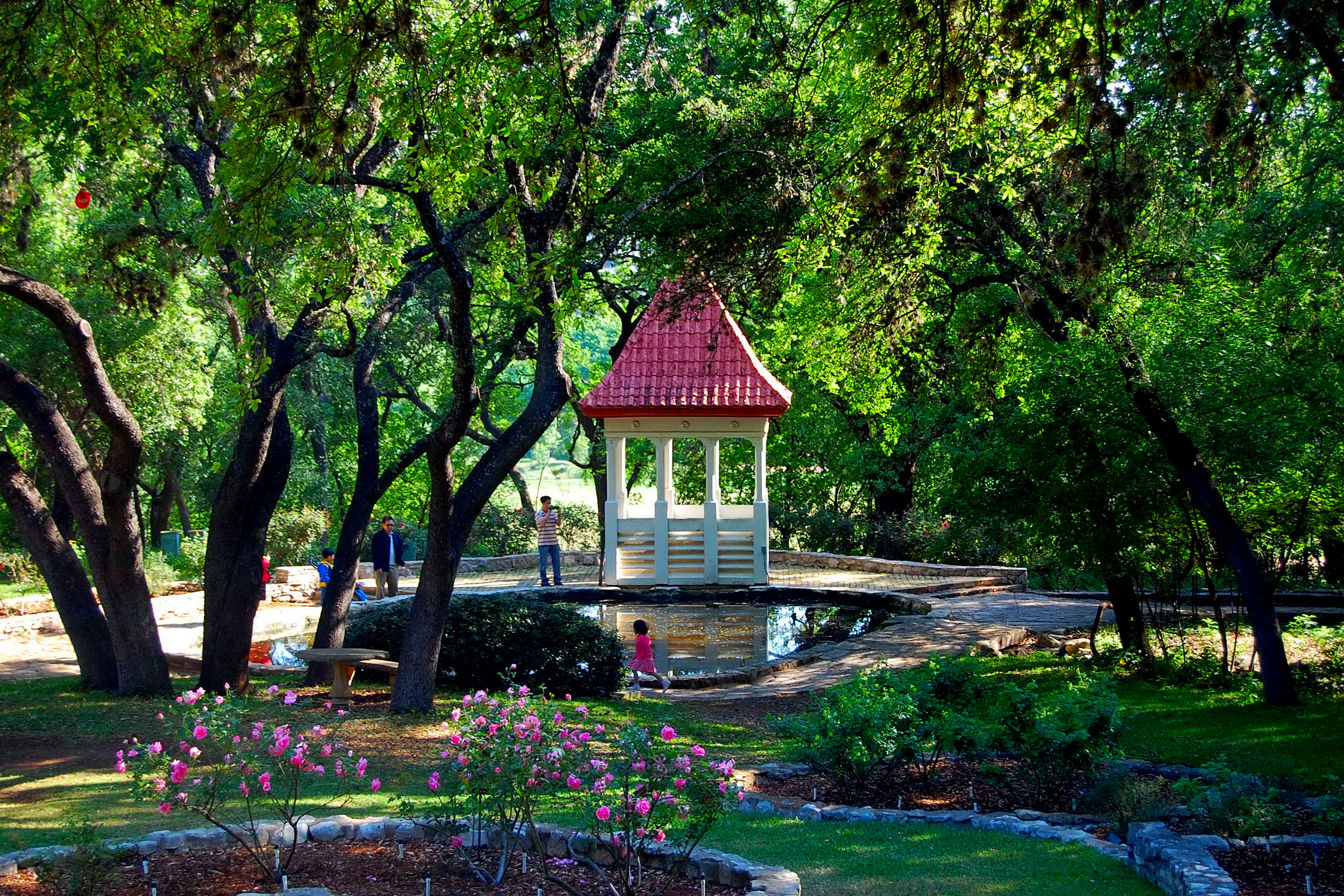
Zilker Botanical Garden

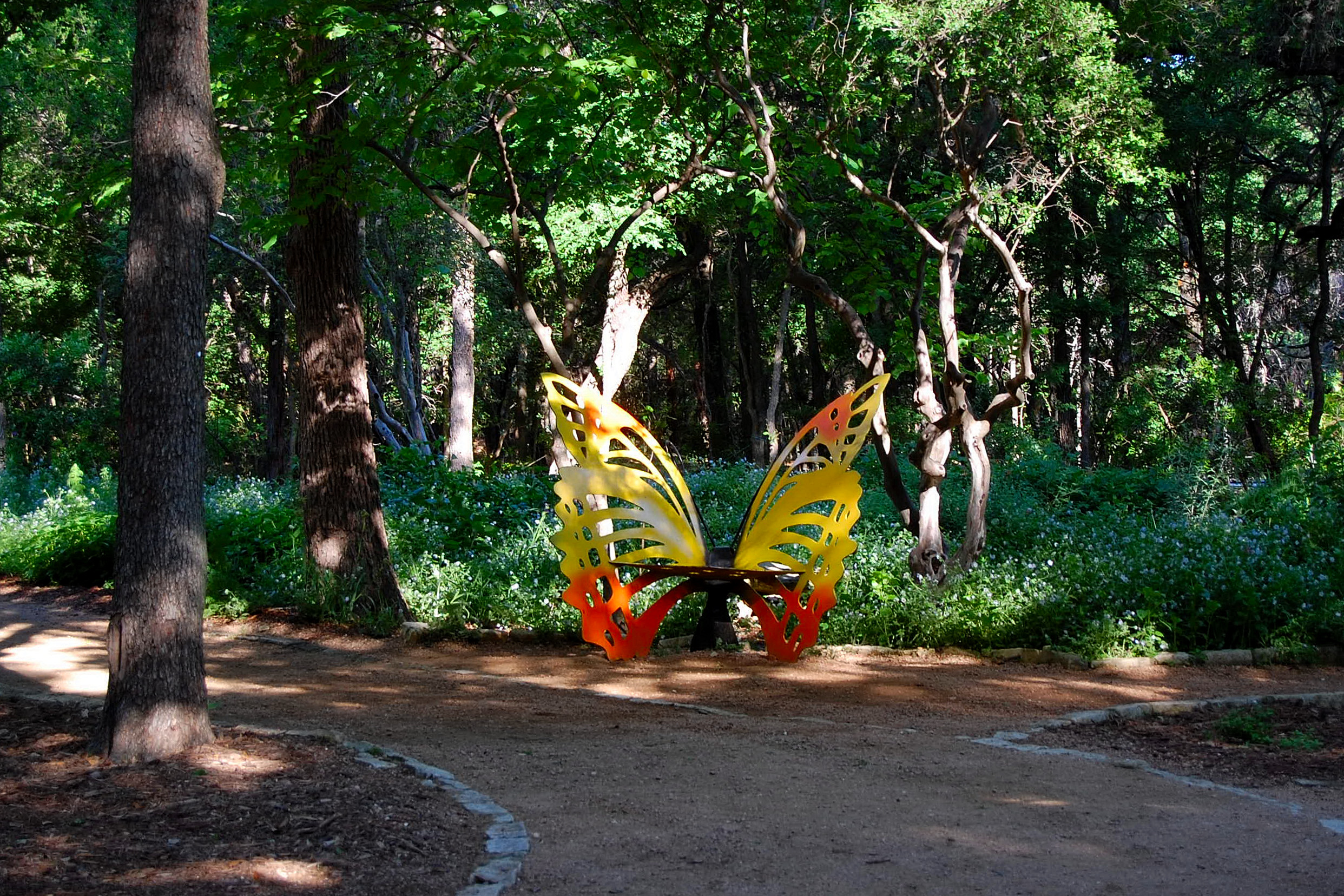
Doug Blachly Butterfly Trail and Garden

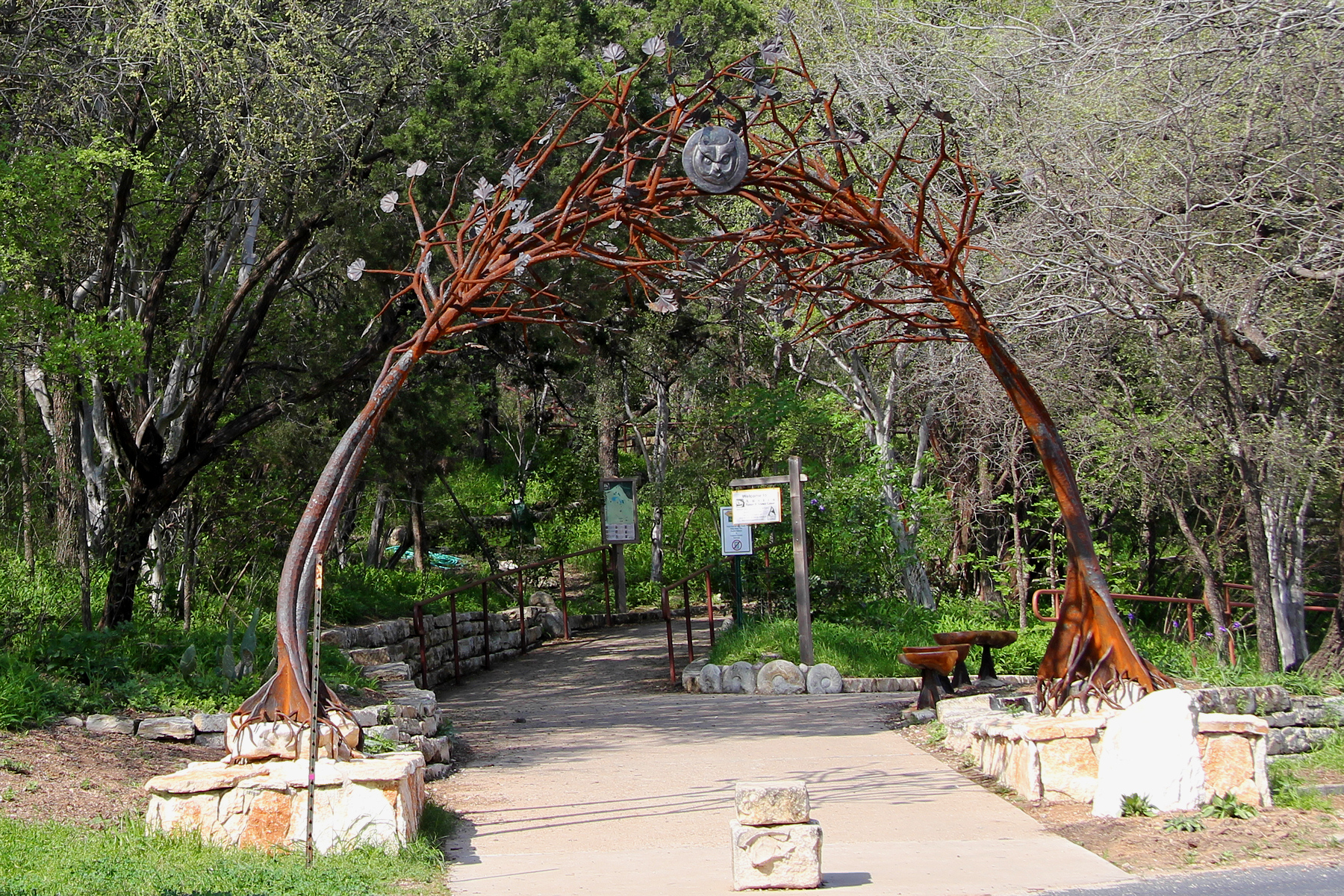
Austin Nature Center

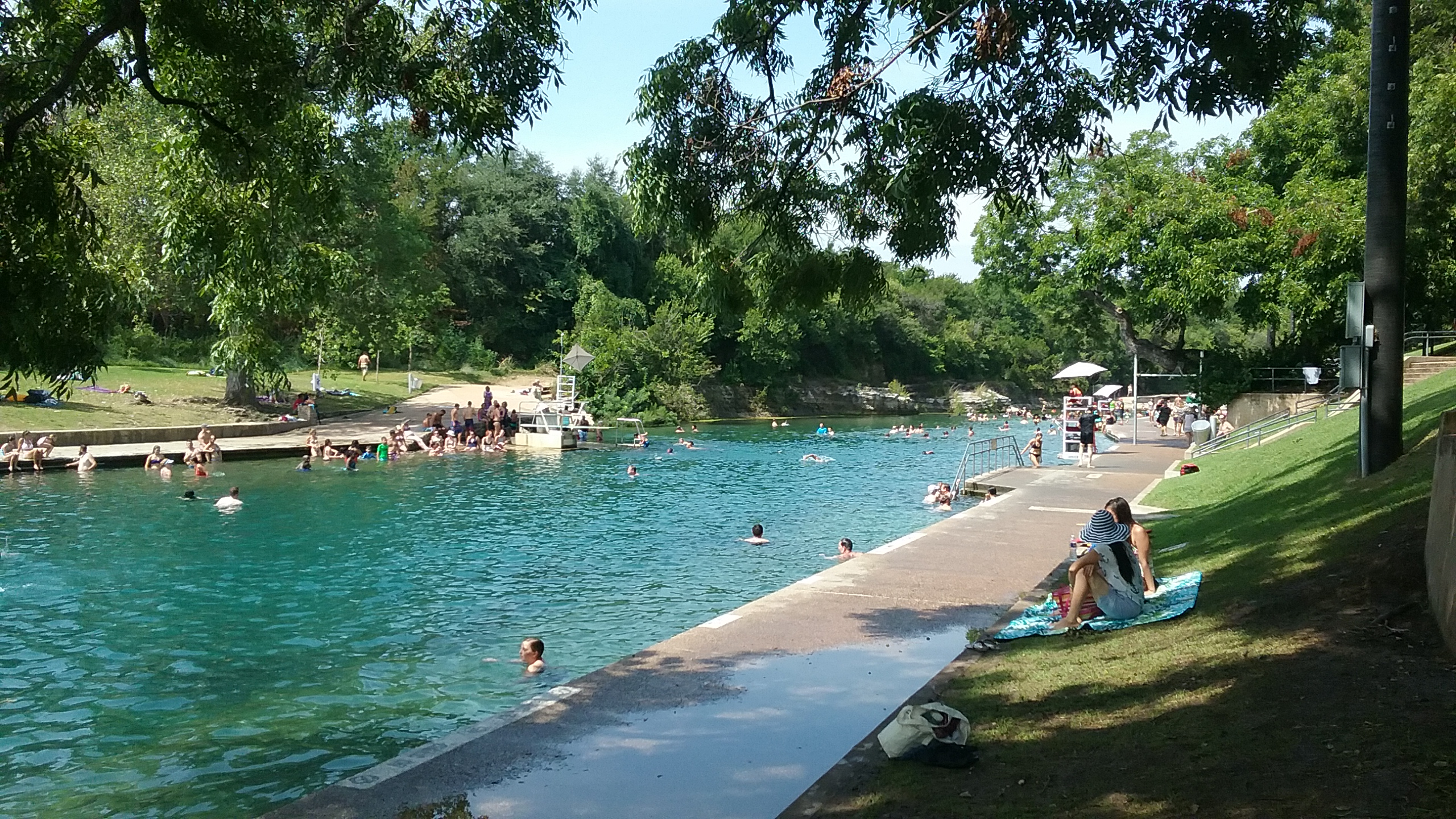
Barton Springs Pool

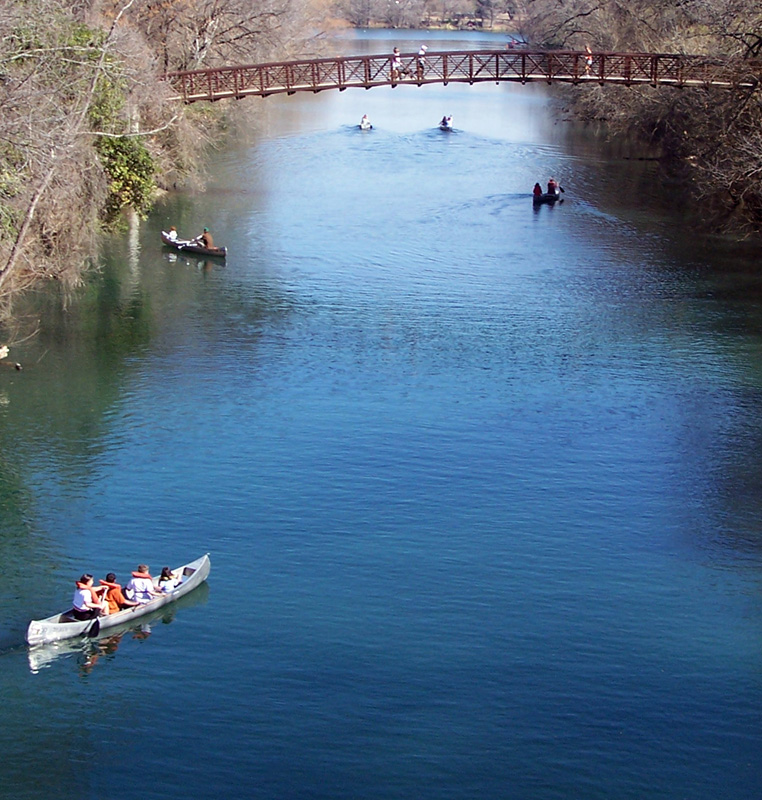
Winter canoeing on Barton Creek

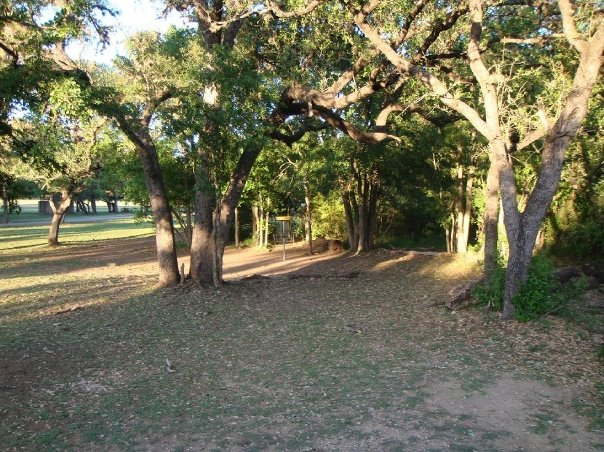
Disc golf course

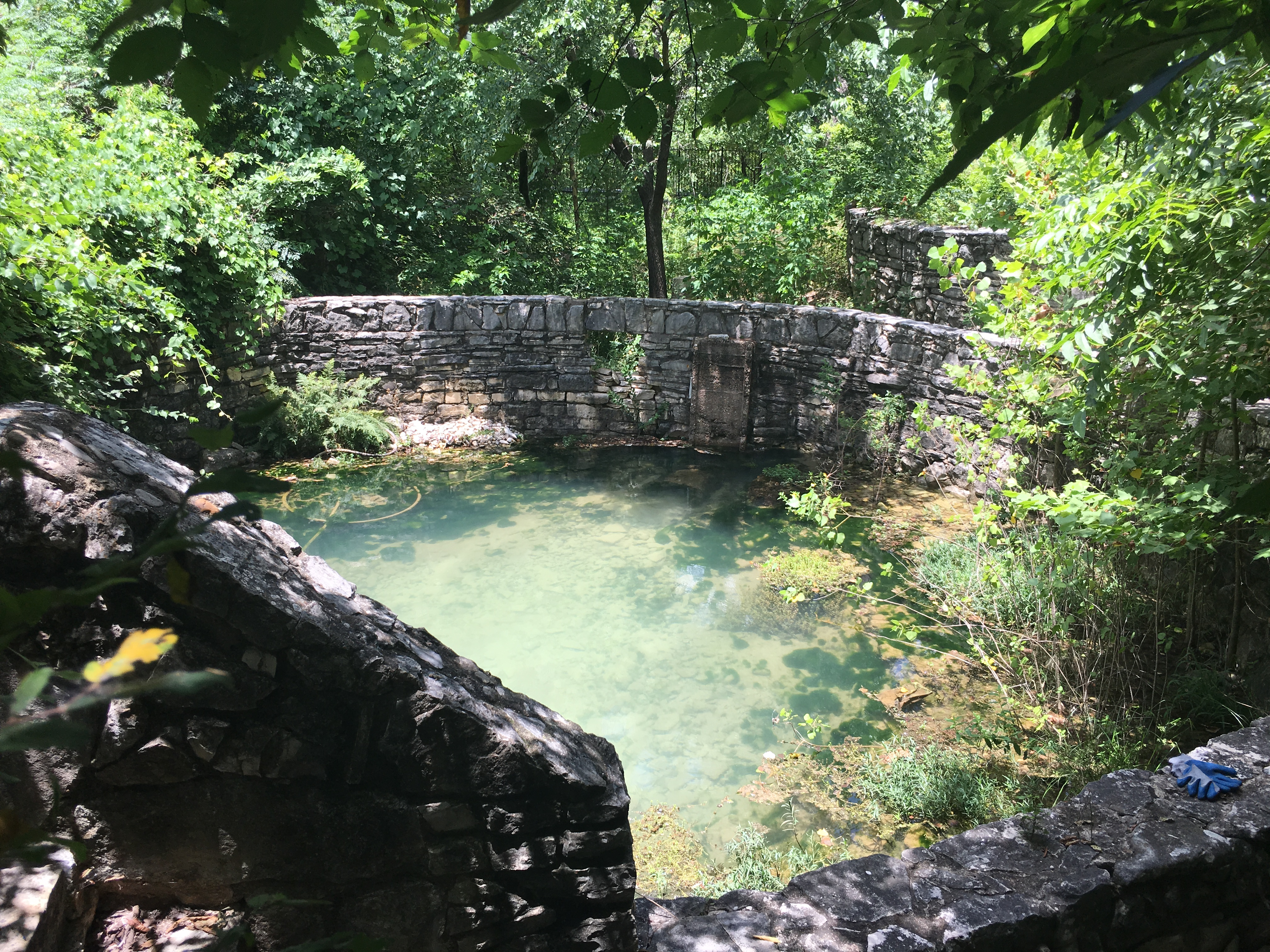
Old Mill Spring

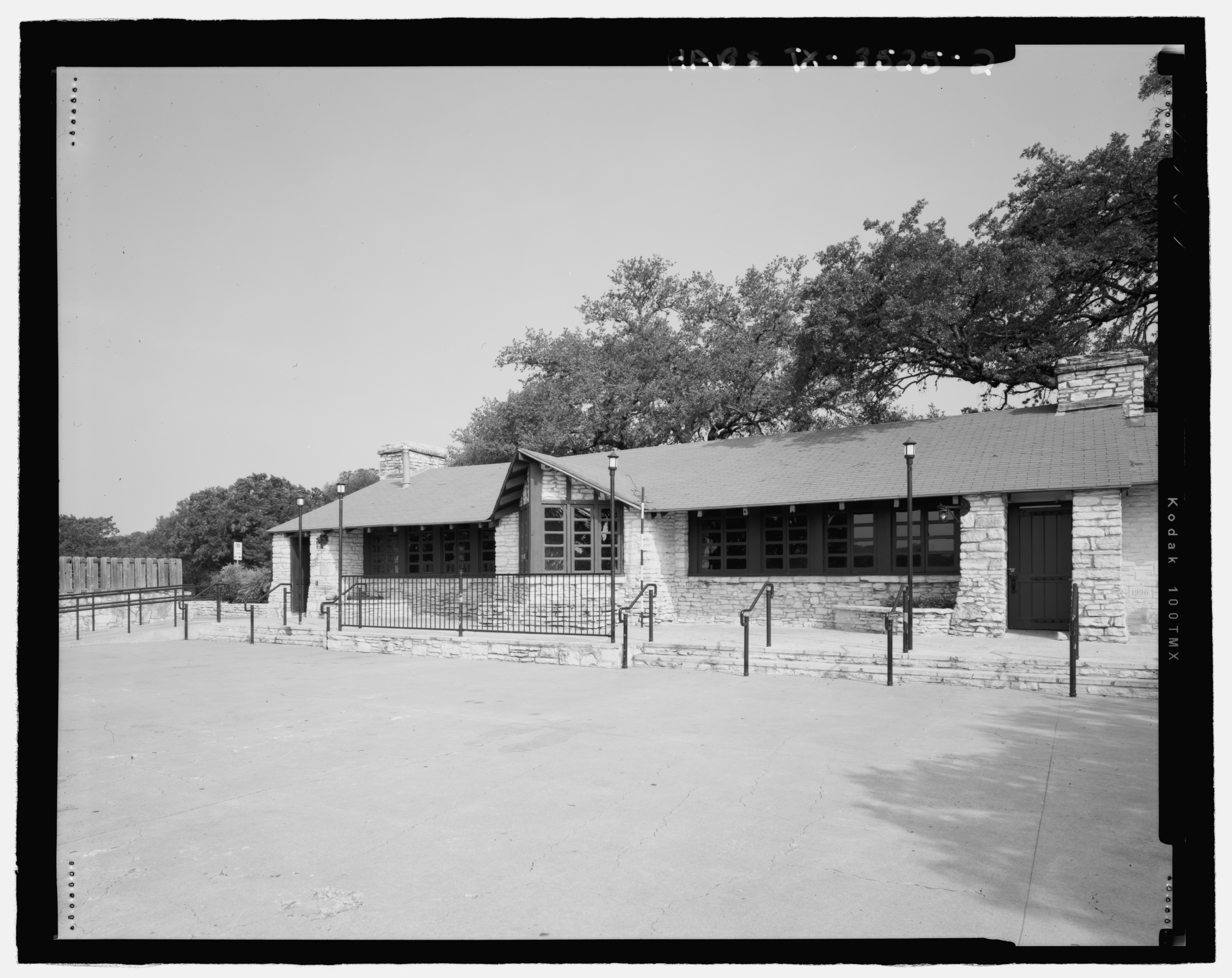
Clubhouse

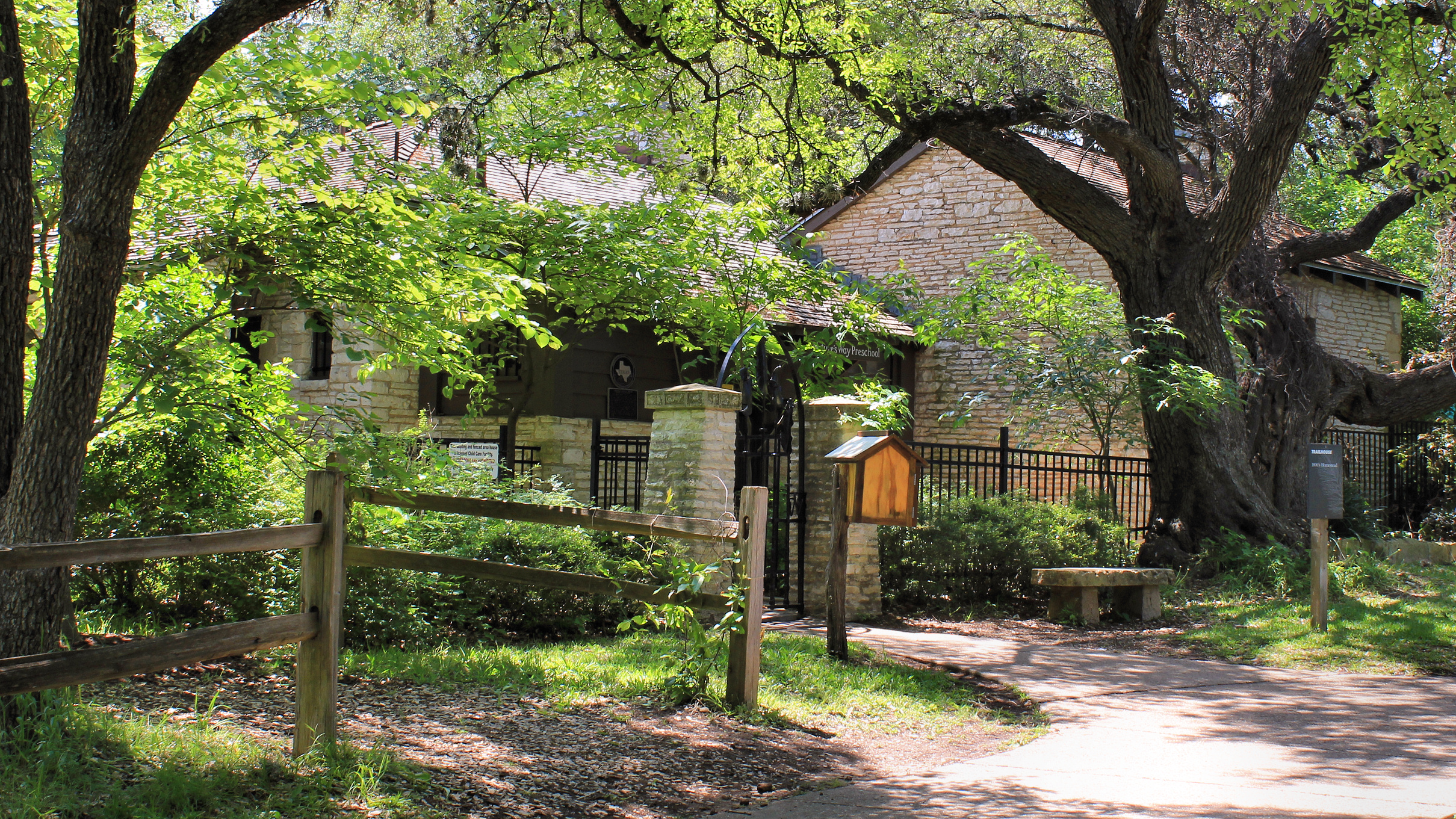
Ashford McGill House

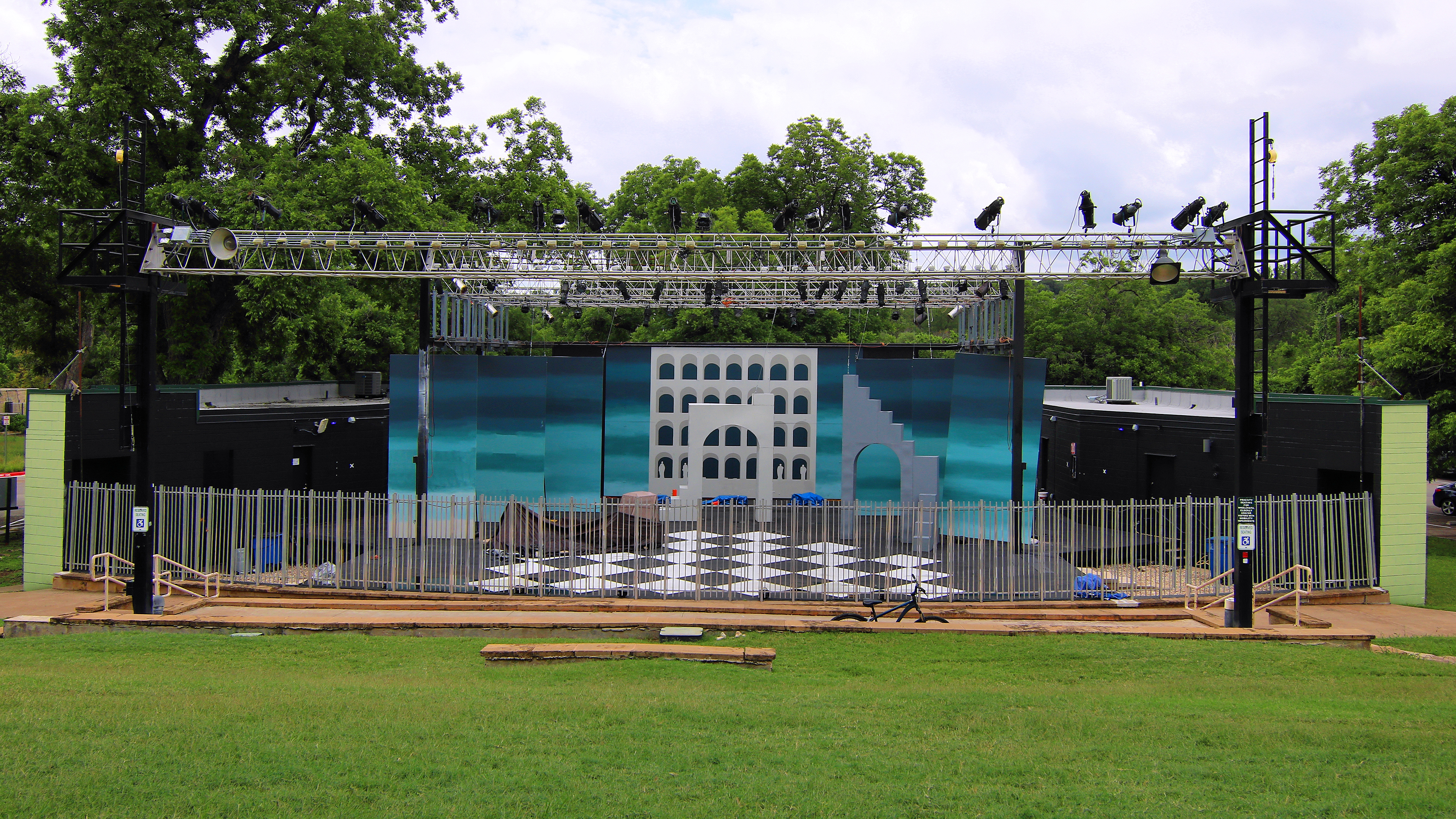
Zilker Hillside Theater

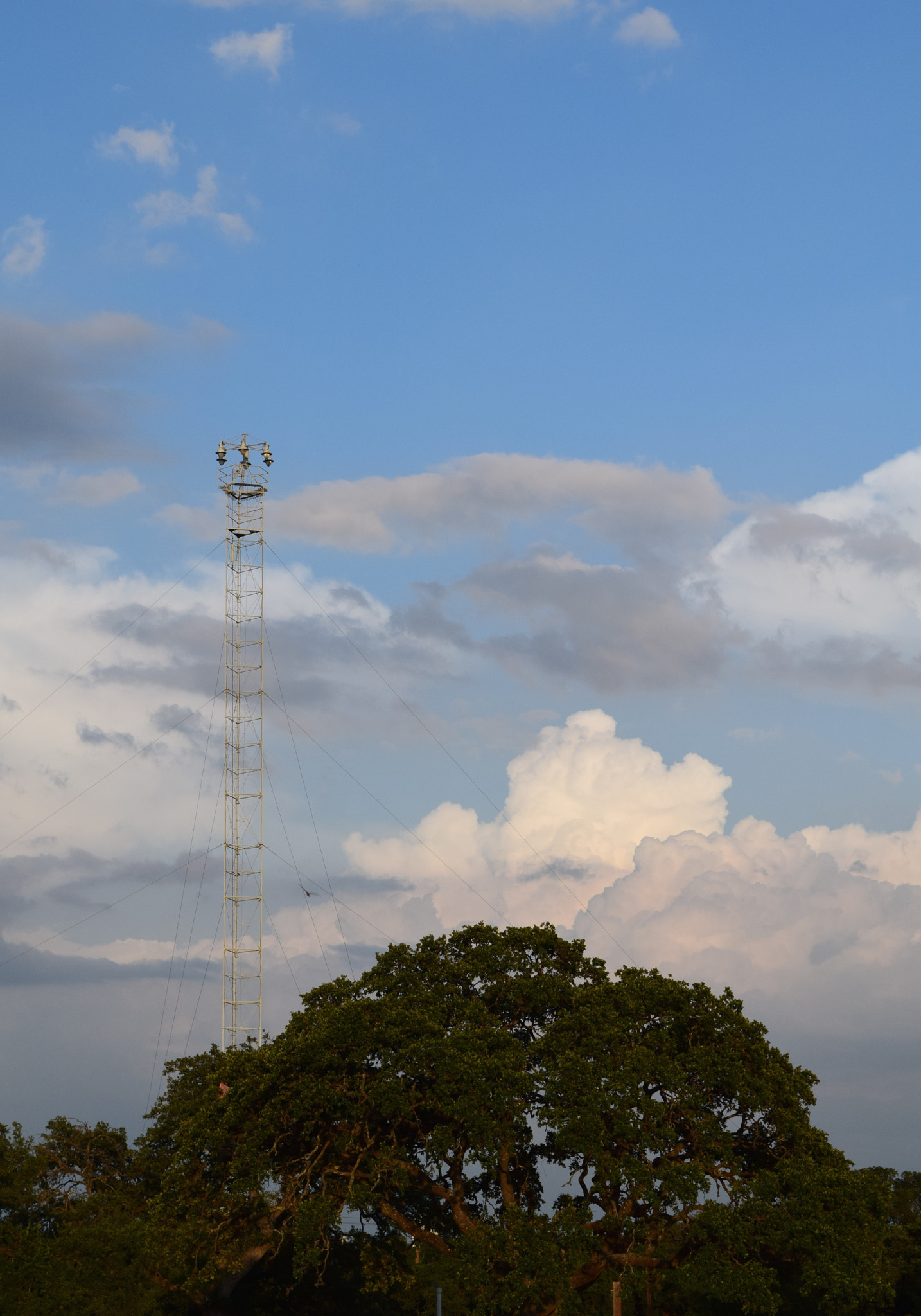
Moontower

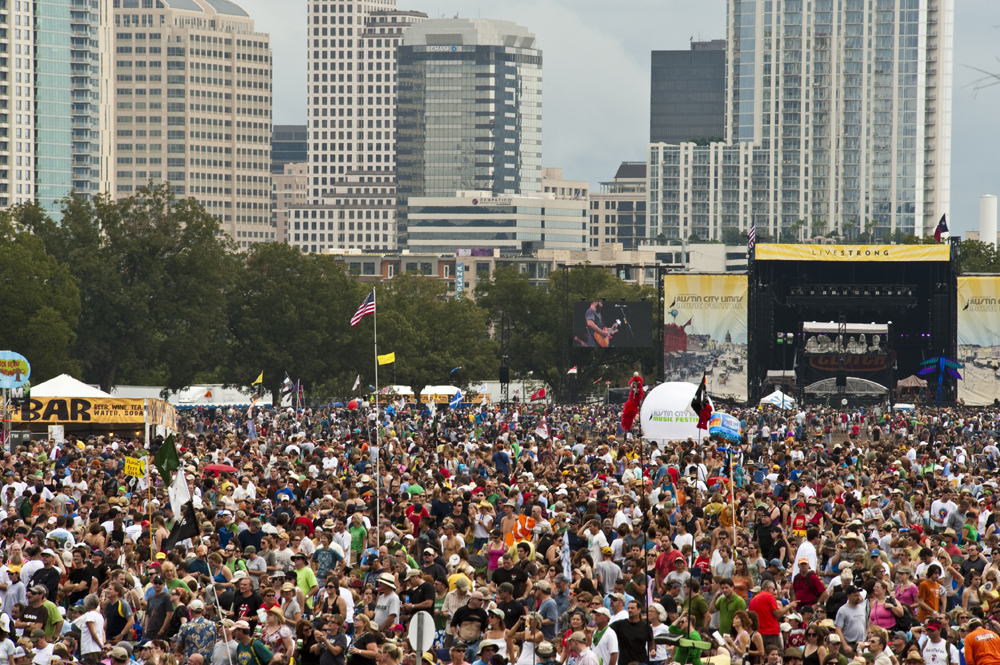
Austin City Limits festival

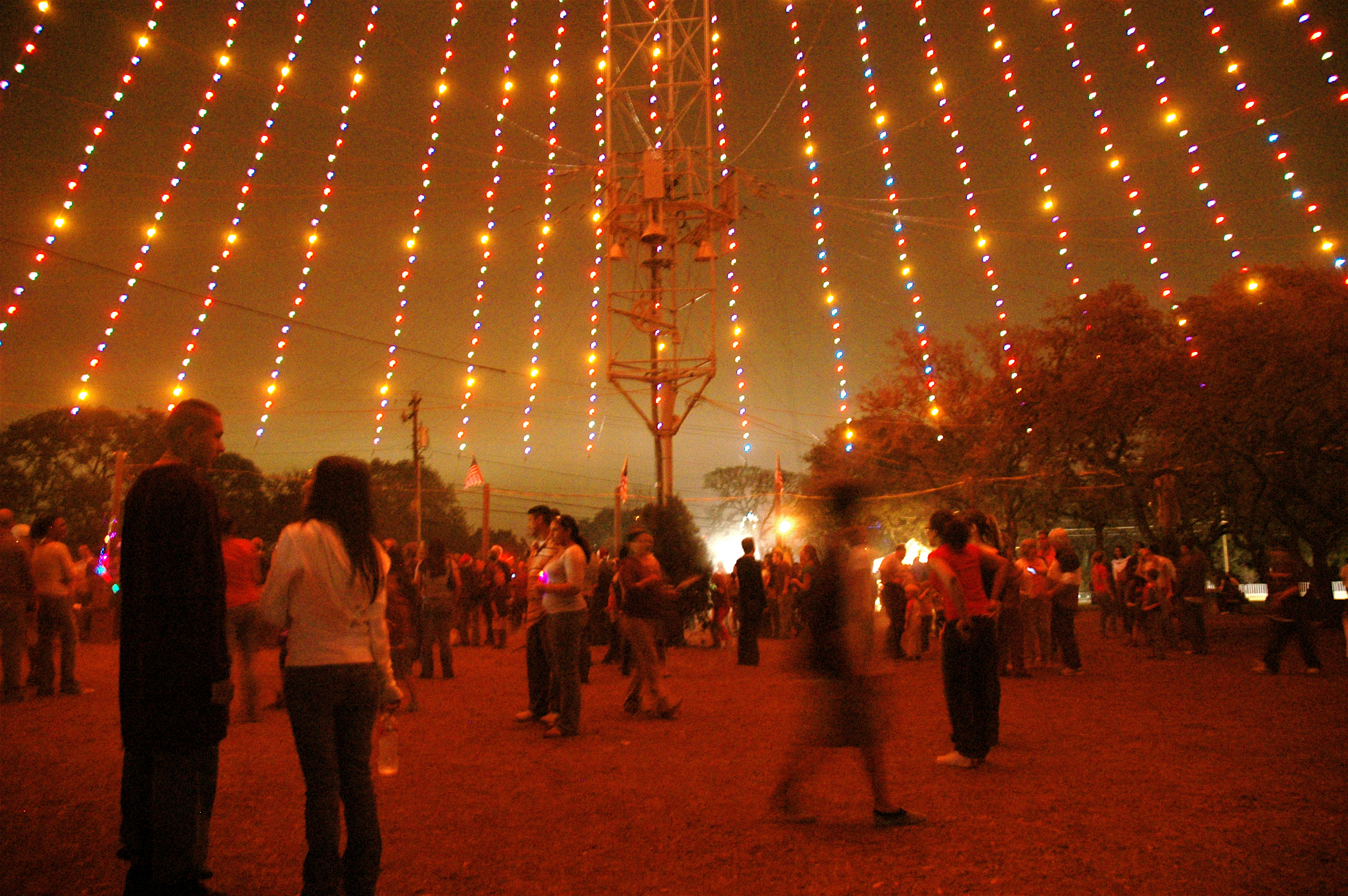
Trail of Lights
