= Zilker Holiday Tree =

Christmas decoration in Austin, Texas

Coordinates: 30°15′59″N 97°46′16.3″W

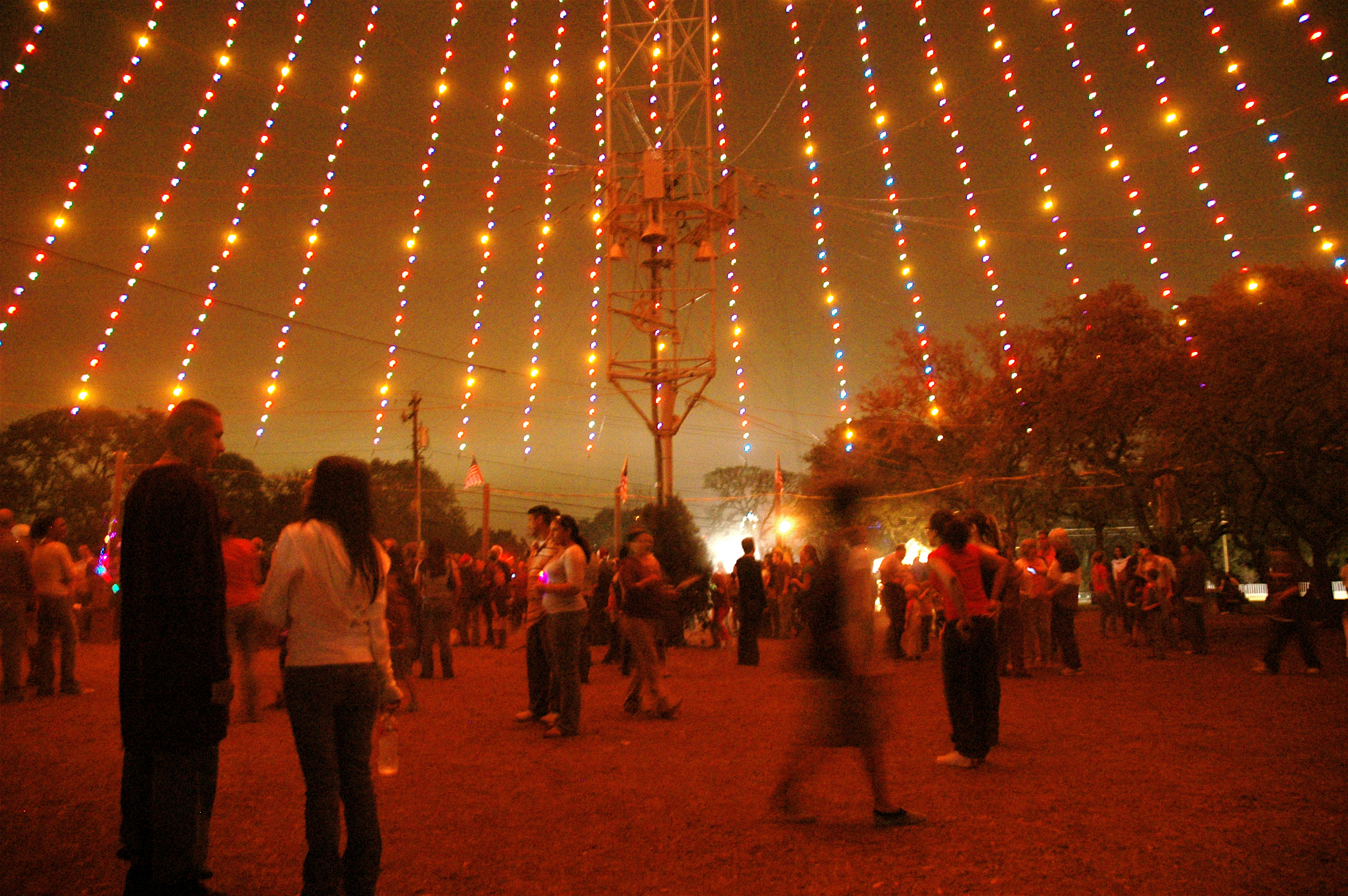
People walking underneath the Zilker Tree.

The Zilker Holiday Tree is a 155 foot Christmas tree made from lights draped from a moonlight tower located in Zilker Park (Austin, Texas). During the Christmas season the tree is lit by over 3000 colored lights. The lighting of the tree has been an annual tradition in Austin since 1967. On December 26, 2010, a five-kilometer run named after the tree took place.

The Zilker Holiday Tree stands 155 feet tall and is composed of 39 streamers, each holding 81 multicolored, 25-watt bulbs - totaling 3,309 lights. At the top of the tree, a double star measures 10 feet from point to point. The double star displays 150 frosted bulbs. This unique spiral pattern of lights was created by City of Austin electricians. At its circumference, the tree measures 380 feet. The diameter is 120 feet. The base of the tree is made up of 19 utility poles, each 14 feet tall, arranged in a circle around the Moonlight Tower. On December 10, 1967, the first tree was lighted by Mayor Pro Tem Mrs. Emma Long. In subsequent years this honor has been awarded to the young winner of a city-wide tree art contest.

== Facts about the holiday tree ==
- The Zilker Moontower is 1 of 17 original Austin towers. Currently 15 remain.
- 155 feet tall
- 380 fee circumference, 120 feet diameter
- 19 utility poles at the base of the historic moontower
- 39 streamers
- Each streamer holds 81 multi-color bulbs (converted to LED in 2019)
- 3309 total lights
- A double star tops the display measuring 10 feet from point to point
- On December 10, 1967, the first tree was lighted by Mayor Pro Tem Mrs. Emma Long

== The Moontowers ==
Originally purchased from the City of Detroit in 1894, these 165-foot-tall towers were installed to help keep Austin streets illuminated and keep residents safe. Austin is the only city in the country that still operates moonlight towers (or moon towers, as they're better known in Austin). In the 1890's the towers were powered with bright carbon-arc bulbs.

In 1970, they were proclaimed Texas State Landmarks and were recognized in the U.S. National Register of Historic Places six years later.

== 2016 Zilker Moontower Restoration Project ==
In 2016 Austin Energy restored the historic moontower. The project deep-cleaned each of the tower's individual parts and repaired aging items. The restoration included new LED light bulbs that are brighter and more energy efficient, "saving approximately 131,400 kilowatt-hours annually, which is the equivalent of powering 11 average-sized homes year-round," according to Austin Energy.
