= Barton Springs =

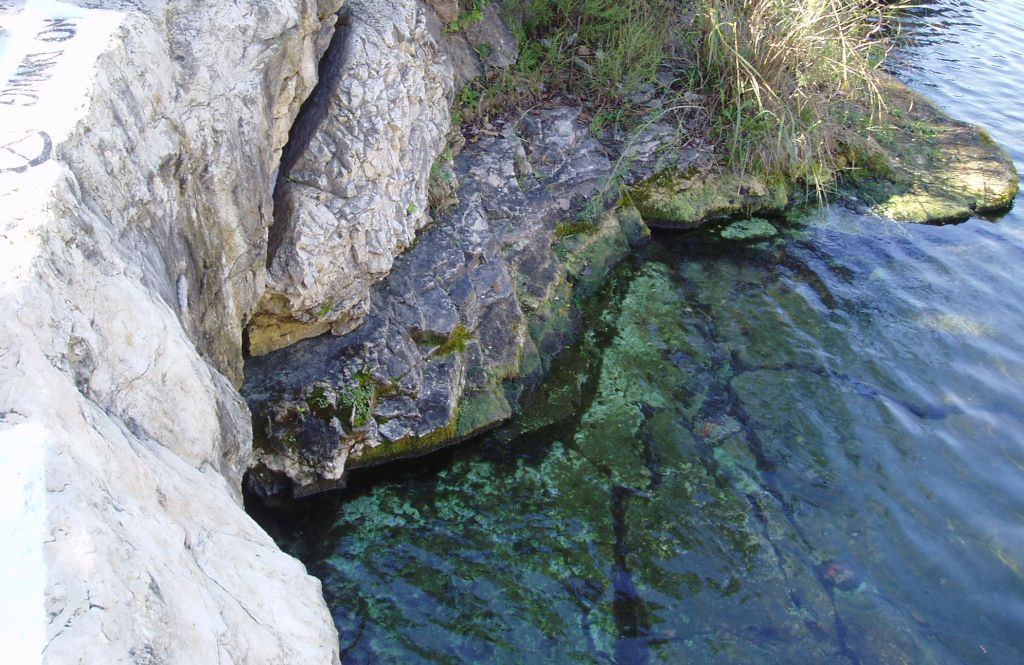
- Main Barton Spring, inside Barton Springs Pool
- Interactive map of Barton Springs
- Spring source: Edwards Aquifer
- Elevation: 435 ft (133 m)
- Type: Karst States
- Provides water for: Barton Creek and Colorado River
- Magnitude: 2
- Discharge: 66 ft³/s (1869 L/s)

- Barton Springs Archeological and Historical District
- U.S. National Register of Historic Places
- U.S. Historic district
- Location within Texas Location within the United States
- Location: Zilker Park, Austin, Texas
- Coordinates: 30.26390°N 97.77000°W
- Area: 138.5 acres (56.0 ha)
- Built: 1891
- Architectural style: Tudor Revival, Bungalow/Craftsman, Queen Anne
- MPS: HBarton Springs MPS
- NRHP reference No.: 85003213
- Added to NRHP: November 27, 1985

Barton Springs is a set of four natural water springs located at Barton Creek on the grounds of Zilker Park in Austin, Texas, resulting from water flowing through the Edwards Aquifer. The largest spring, Main Barton Spring (also known as Parthenia, "the mother spring"), supplies water to Barton Springs Pool, a popular recreational destination in Austin. The smaller springs are located nearby, two with man-made structures built to contain and direct their flow. The springs are the only known habitat of the Barton Springs Salamander, an endangered species.

The Barton Creek National Archeological and Historic District was formed in 1985.

== Geology ==
Barton Springs is the main discharge point for the Barton Springs segment of the Edwards Aquifer of Texas, a well known karst aquifer. Geologically, the aquifer is composed of limestone from the Cretaceous period, about 100 million years old. Fractures, fissures, conduits, and caves have developed in this limestone. Both physical forces, such as faulting, and chemical forces, such as dissolution of limestone by infiltrating water, have enlarged these voids. This results in a karst aquifer made up of limestone with large void spaces. Water then enters the aquifer and fills the voids.

All water discharging from Barton Springs originates as rainfall. Some of this rain falls directly onto the area of land where the aquifer limestone rock is exposed, which is known as the recharge zone. Other rainfall enters into creeks that cross the recharge zone, and infiltrates the limestone bedrock. After water enters the aquifer, it flows along the gradients created by differences in hydraulic pressure into the area of lowest hydraulic pressure. This lowest point of hydraulic pressure is Barton Springs.

=== Main spring ===
Main Barton Spring (Parthenia) is the most famous, yet least visible, of the four springs because it is completely submerged by pool water. Located near the diving board in Barton Springs Pool, the spring's flow is not always visible at the surface.

The main spring discharges an average flow of about 31 million US gallons (120,000 m^{3}) per day. The lowest discharge ever recorded was 9 million US gallons (34,000 m^{3}) per day during the drought of the 1950s, and the highest discharge ever recorded was 85 million US gallons (320,000 m^{3}) per day during December 1991 and September 2016 flooding. By comparison, a typical domestic in-ground swimming pool holds about 20,000 US gallons (76 m^{3}), and the City of Austin, a city of about 1 million residents, uses about 120 million US gallons (450,000 m^{3}) per day for its public water supply system.

== Other springs ==
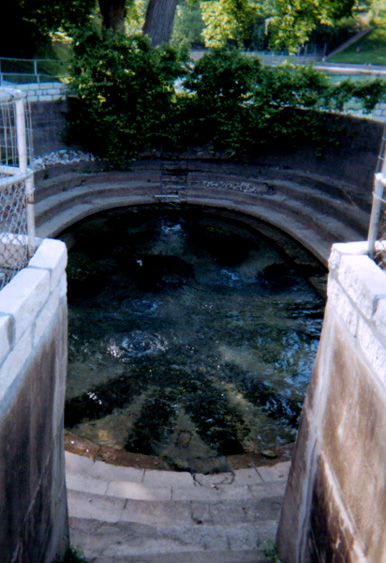
Eliza Spring in 2005.

The three other springs associated with Barton Springs are Eliza, Old Mill, and Upper Barton Spring. Each is significantly smaller than Main Barton Spring, discharging an average of 3 million US gallons (11,000 m^{3}) per day. Sometimes, these springs dry up completely.

Eliza Spring, also known as Concession Spring, is located near the north entrance to Barton Springs Pool, 300 feet (100 m) east towards the children's playscape. During the early 20th century, an amphitheater-style swimming enclosure was built around the spring. This structure is no longer open to the public due to safety concerns, and the fact that Eliza Spring has become a sensitive habitat area for the endangered Barton Springs Salamander.

Old Mill Spring, also known as Sunken Gardens Spring or Zenobia Spring, is located on the south side of Barton Springs Pool. Like Eliza Spring, the early 20th-century structure built around the spring is now closed to public access due to safety and endangered species habitat issues. Scientific analysis shows that the water at Old Mill Spring has a slightly different chemistry than that of Main Barton Spring and Eliza Spring, even though it is less than half a mile (800 m) away from these springs.

Upper Barton Spring is located in the creek bed of Barton Creek, about a half mile (800 m) upstream or west of Barton Springs Pool. Frequently dry, Upper Barton Spring is fully submerged by Barton Creek during floods. The water at Upper Barton Spring also has a significantly different chemistry than the other springs.

The entire area around Barton Springs is riddled with faults from the Balcones Fault Zone and features other, smaller springs. For example, about one mile (2 km) upstream of Upper Barton Spring, an intermittent spring fills a popular natural swimming hole. Several other small springs empty directly into the Barton Creek bypass tunnel that passes to the side of Barton Springs Pool.

== Fauna ==
Two salamander species are found only at Barton Springs: the Barton Springs salamander and the Austin blind salamander.
