= Barton Creek =

River in the United States of America

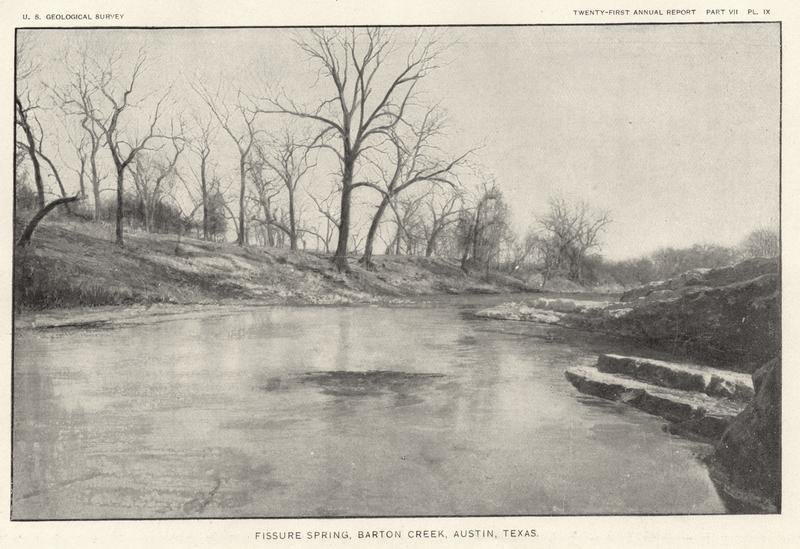
- Barton Creek in 1900
- Barton creek watershed in Travis County

Location
- Country: United States
- State: Texas
- Region: Texas Hill Country
- Municipality: Austin

Physical characteristics
- Source: Hays County, Texas
  - coordinates: 30°14′22.87″N 98°9′10.4″W
  - elevation: 380 m (1,250 ft)
- Mouth: Colorado River (Texas)
  - location: Lady Bird Lake
  - coordinates: 30°16′1.46″N 97°45′40.63″W
  - elevation: 130 m (430 ft)
- Length: 64 km (40 mi)
- Discharge
  - average: 1.84 m^{3}/s (65 cu ft/s)

Barton Creek is a tributary that feeds the Colorado River as it flows through the Texas Hill Country. The creek passes through some of the more scenic areas in Greater Austin, surrounded in many parts by a greenbelt of protected lands that serves as a habitat for many indigenous species of flora and fauna. The creek passes through Barton Creek Greenbelt and is fed by Barton Springs.

== Course ==
The creek begins in northern Hays County and flows 40 miles (64 km) east through Austin, draining into the Edwards Aquifer recharge zone in southwest Austin. The stream then reemerges at Barton Springs and proceeds toward Lady Bird Lake (formerly Town Lake), where it joins with the Colorado River. The main entrance to Airmen's Cave is in the banks of Barton Creek.

== History ==
During the 17th and 18th centuries, Barton Creek is believed to have hosted Tonkawa and Comanche Indian camps. The creek is named after William Barton, who built a house near Barton Springs in 1837. As Austin grew the springs became a popular resort, and the natural swimming hole was replaced with a pool some time during the 1930s.

=== Water quality conservation ===
Development in Austin in the 1970s and 1980s began to threaten both the creek's water quality and wildlife. Heavy rainfall often led to contamination of the stream due to runoff and sewer line seepage from the upstream subdivisions entering the Edwards Aquifer recharge zone.

Following public outcry, the Austin City Council passed the Barton Creek watershed ordinance in 1980 and the Comprehensive Watersheds Ordinance in 1986. Proposals in 1990 to develop land in the watershed resulted in more public outcry, which spurred passage of the Save Our Springs Citizens' Initiative of 1992, which severely limited construction, curtailed tax exemptions, established pollution control standards and implemented methods for reducing accidental contamination.

=== Ecological conservation ===
The middle part of the creek runs through Barton Creek Greenbelt, a public recreation space of protected land surrounding the creek. In 1994 The Nature Conservancy purchased land surrounding the upper creek to establish the Barton Creek Habitat Preserve, a 4,084-acre (1,653 ha) habitat maintained in cooperation with local residents. The reserve is home to old-growth stands of juniper, oak, cedar and elm trees, rare woodland flowers and plants such as Heller's marbleseed and gravelbar brickellbush, endangered golden-cheeked warblers and the threatened Guadalupe bass.

== Recreation ==
During rainy seasons, upper Barton Creek hosts water recreation including kayaking, tubing, and swimming. The Lower Barton Creek Greenbelt features these water sports year-round with swimming in Barton Springs Pool, and kayaking and canoeing in the creek fed with the discharge from the springs.

== Gallery ==
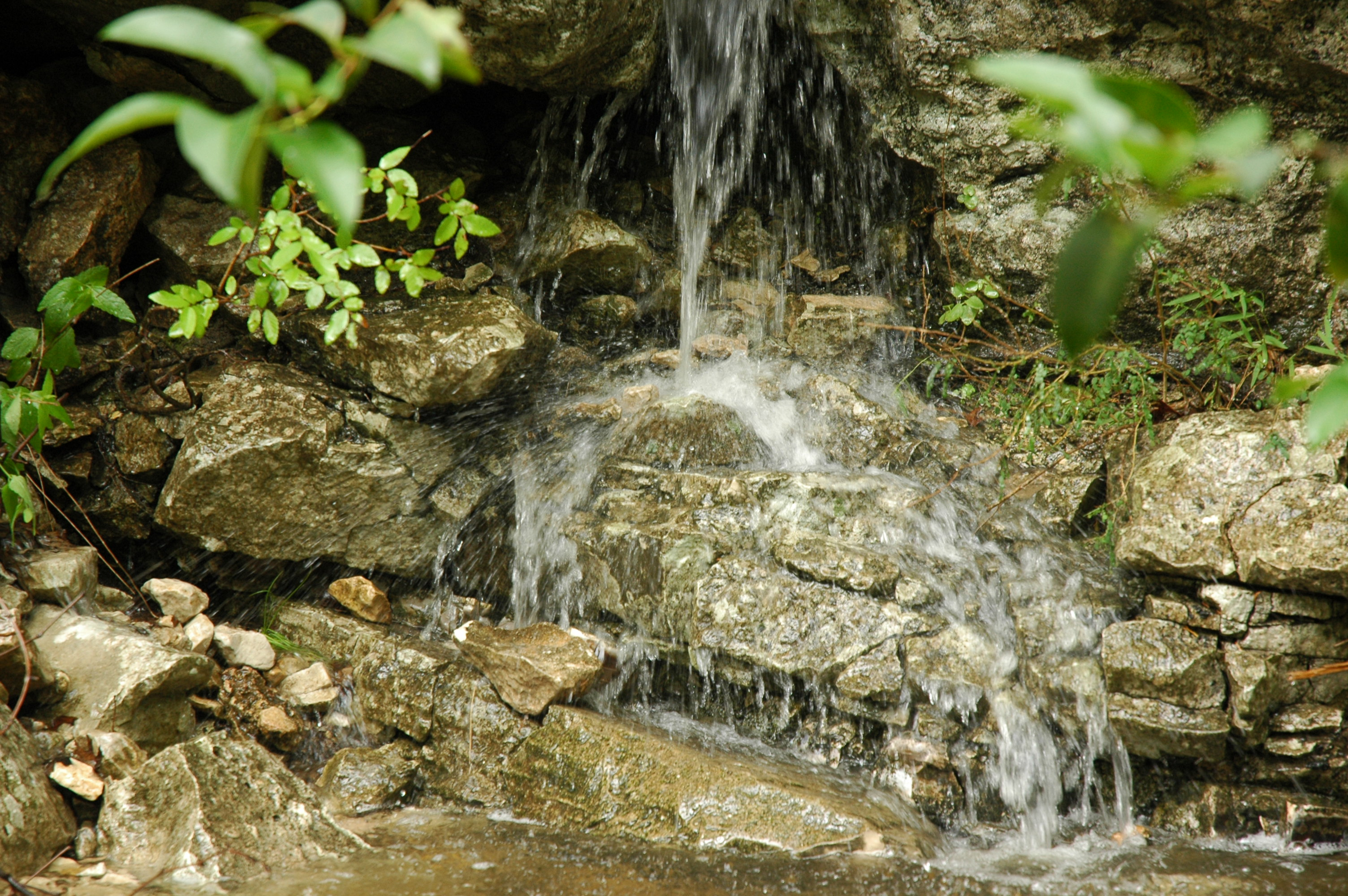
Waterfall on Barton Creek

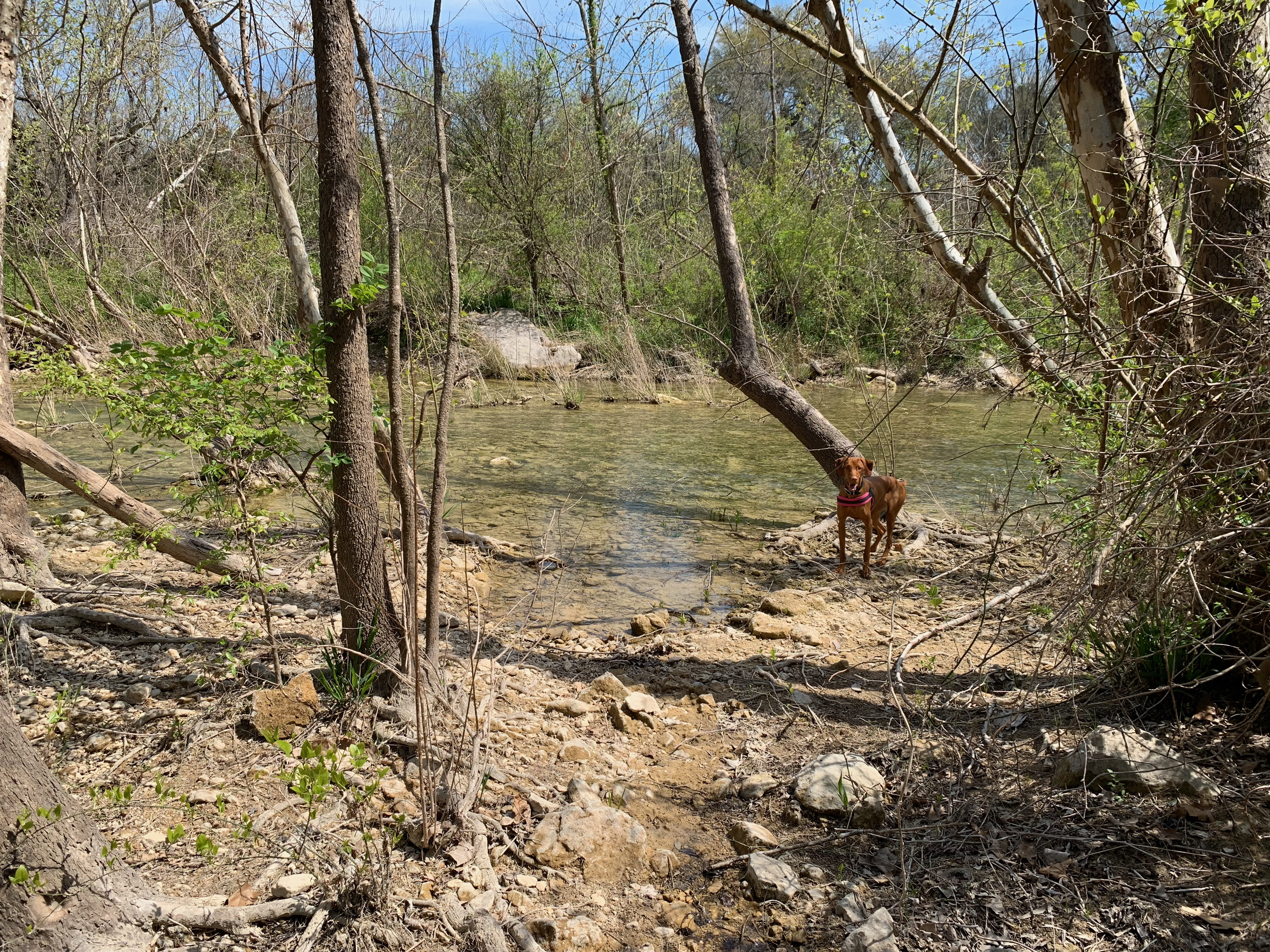
A Vizsla standing near the Little Barton Creek confluence

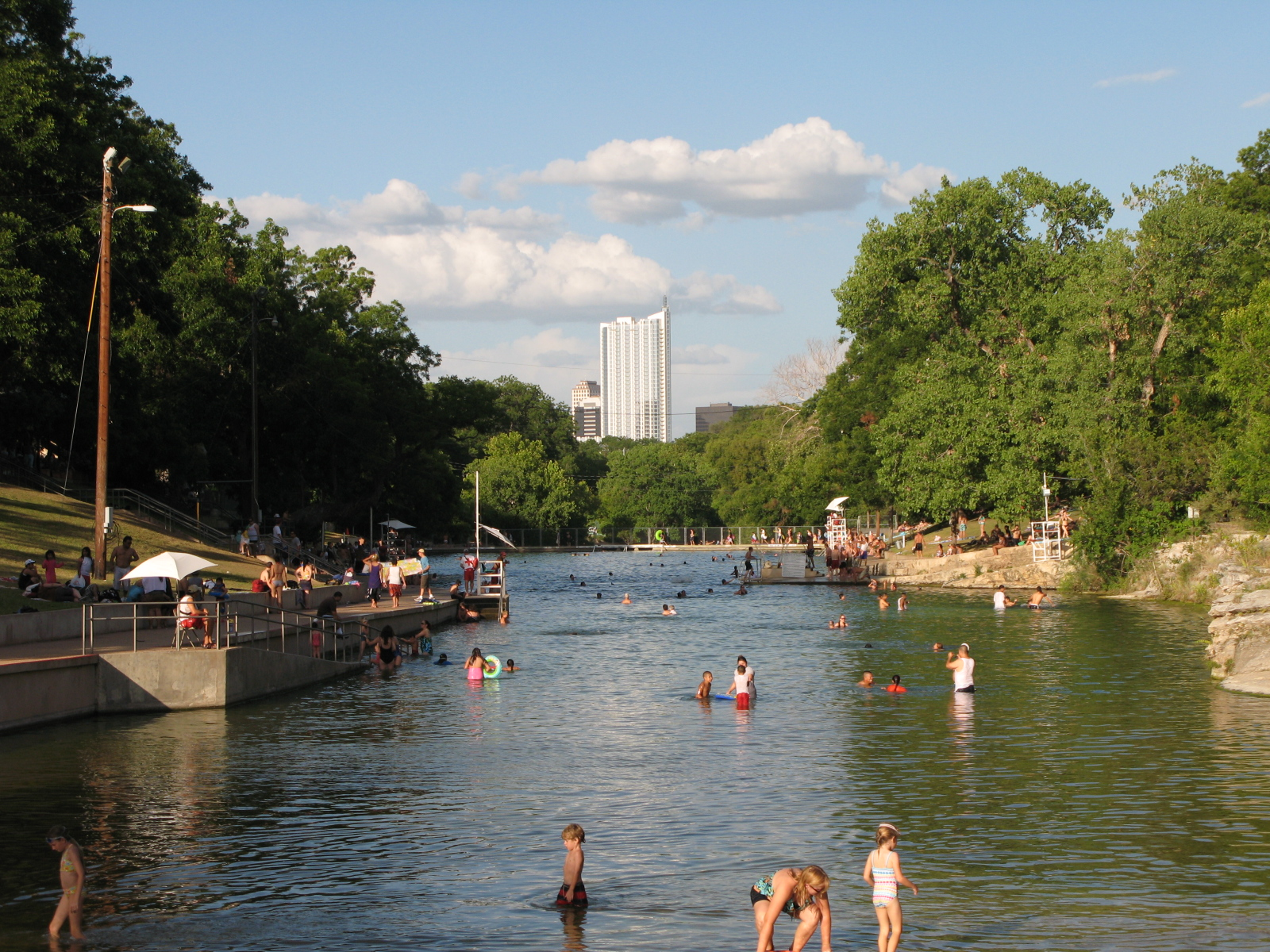
Barton Springs

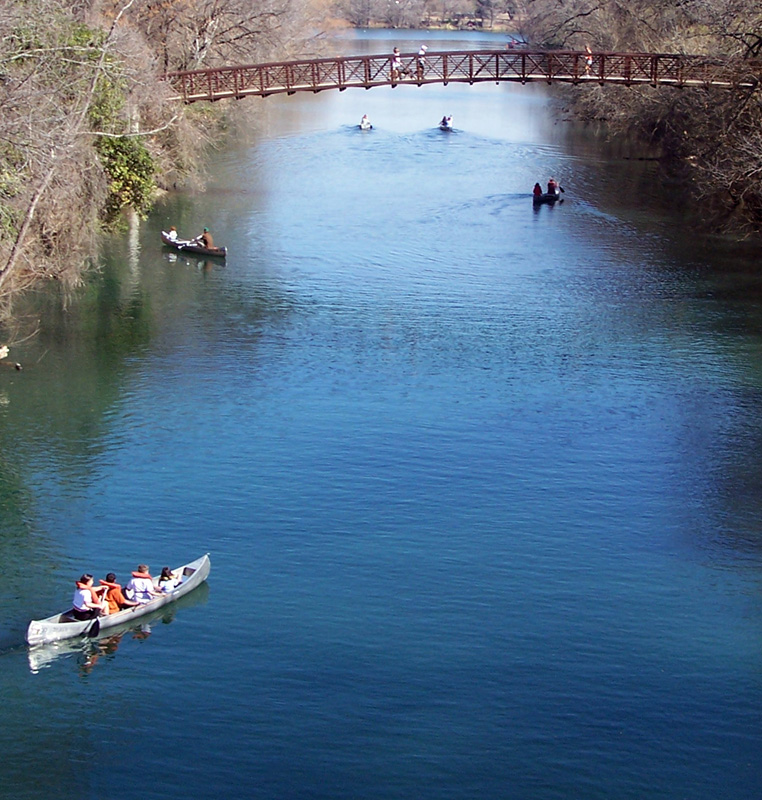
Barton Creek near the Colorado River confluence

== See also ==
- Balcones Canyonlands National Wildlife Refuge
- Barton Creek, Texas
- List of rivers of Texas
