= Sustainable Neighborhoods =

Civic organization based in Austin, Texas

Sustainable Neighborhoods of North Central Austin is a civic organization based in the north central part of Austin, Texas. SN's mission is to ensure that redevelopment occurring on commercial arterials in North Central Austin is neighborhood-friendly.

== History ==
According to the group's website, Sustainable Neighborhoods was founded in November 2007 by members of the VMU and land use teams of four North Central Austin neighborhood associations: Allandale, Crestview, North Shoal Creek, and Wooten. In 2009, members of the Highland Neighborhood Association also joined the organization.

SN has hosted meetings with City of Austin policymakers to discuss planning of Burnet Rd, Lamar Blvd, Anderson Ln and Airport Blvd. Guests have included Council Member Chris Riley, Planning Commissioner Kathie Tovo, UT faculty, planners from the City of Austin and CapMetro, architects and developers.

In April 2009, SN with six area neighborhood associations organized an Austin City Council candidate forum that focused on transit corridor planning issues, including minimum requirements for outdoor features.

== Neighborhood Centers ==
SN has identified eight "neighborhood centers" in North Central Austin, based on their mixed use zoning and proximity to planned or potential transit stations. These are: Burnet-Anderson, Burnet Farmer's Market, Burnet-2222, Burnet-North Loop, Lamar-Anderson, Crestview Station, Lamar-2222, Highland Mall. Six of these districts have Vertical Mixed Use (VMU) zoning. SN is seeking minimum standards for public open space in VMU districts similar to that called for with transit-oriented development (TOD) zoning.

SN in 2009 identified the Crestview-Highland segment of CapMetro's Rails with Trails project as its "Project of the Year".

== Activities ==
SN in October 2010 organized a tree-planting at Lamar Middle School, implementing a part of the school's Safe Routes to School plan.

In 2012, SN has cooperated with CapMetro in planting tree seedlings in plastic buckets near bus stops.
