= Allandale, Austin, Texas =

Neighborhood in Austin, Texas, United States of America

Neighborhood map

Allandale, Austin, Texas is a neighborhood in North Central Austin, in the U.S. State of Texas known for its large lots, mature trees, and central location.

The Allandale neighborhood boundaries are Burnet Road and the Brentwood and Crestview neighborhoods to the east, Mopac Expressway and the Northwest Hills neighborhood to the west, 45th Street and the Rosedale neighborhood to the south, and West Anderson Lane and the North Shoal Creek neighborhood to the north. The neighborhood is bisected by Shoal Creek Blvd, and its namesake, the perennial Shoal Creek.

Allandale is located within City Council District 7.

== Allandale history ==
The area now considered the Allandale neighborhood was originally part of an 1841 land grant to George W. Davis by the President of the Republic of Texas, Mirabeau B Lamar, for his service in the Battle of San Jacinto. Over the years, Davis (and his descendants) sold most of the 3,154 acres he was granted; however, the Davis family cemetery, a Texas Historical Cemetery, is in Allandale.

=== 1981 Flood ===
On Memorial Day 1981, eleven inches of rain fell in three hours in some places in Austin. At the height of the storm around midnight, Shoal Creek, which normally flows at 90 gallons a minute was raging at 6.55 million gallons per minute. By morning, 13 people were dead, hundreds of homes were destroyed, and Shoal Creek was clogged with dozens of new cars that had washed into the creek from a nearby dealership.

=== Plesiosaur Fossil Find ===
In 1991, local dentist and amateur paleontologist Robert McDonald found plesiosaur fossils in Shoal Creek near Greenlawn Parkway and Shoal Creek Blvd. A concrete stamp depicting the fossil is located at the Great Northern detention pond spillway.

== Northcross Mall ==
Northcross Mall was a 360,000 square foot indoor mall that opened in 1975 and was replaced by a Walmart in 2010. The Walmart had originally been planned as a 180,000 square foot two-story Walmart in 2006, however, amid protests, those plans were scaled back to the 99,000 square foot single-story Walmart that exists today.

When Northcross Mall opened in 1975 it did so with an ice skating rink, the only one within 200 miles of Austin, at the time. When the ice skating rink closed from 2001 to 2004 the mall saw a 40-50% decline in traffic. The ice skating rink became Chaparral Ice in the same location, in a strip mall detached from Walmart.

== Cemeteries ==
=== Historic Davis Cemetery ===
Davis Cemetery, located on Vine St. between Twin Oaks and Cavileer Ave., is the family cemetery of George W. Davis, who was granted the surrounding land in 1841 for his service in The Battle of San Jacinto. It was dedicated as a historic cemetery on March 10, 2000. It contains about 100 graves ranging from the mid 1800s to 1918.

=== Austin Memorial Park Cemetery ===
Opened in 1927, the cemetery spans an area greater than 100 acres with over 100,000 single graves.

== Infrastructure ==
=== Bus Transportation ===
Allandale has several Capital Metropolitan Transportation Authority bus lines that service the neighborhood. A few examples are 3, 5, 30, 320, 491, and Austin's second Capital MetroRapid the 803.

=== Highway ===
Burnet Rd is connected to US Highway 183 on the North, RM 2222 connects to Interstate Highway 35 on the East and Allandale Rd/Northland Dr connect to Mopac Expressway on the West.

=== Railroad ===
Union Pacific Railroad has freight tracks that run on the West Side of the neighborhood, between the neighborhood and Mopac Expressway. These tracks consist single track and a siding rail.

== Demographics ==
According to the 2013 American Community Survey, the median age for Allandale was 37.8 years, and the median household income was $57,429. 45% of the residents were married, and 54% were single. 49% were male and 51% were female. Approximately 77% of the neighborhood's households had no one under the age of 18 living there. 12% of the population was over the age of 65. Among people over age 25, approximately 52% had a bachelor's degree or higher. Just over 20% of the neighborhood's total population were Hispanic American or Latino, while 72% of Allandale's population were White, 2.4% were Asian, and 2.1% were Black or African American.

== Recreation ==
Beverly S. Sheffield Northwest District Park is in the heart of Allandale. One of the first recorded used of the park was as an old limestone quarry that supplied limestone for the 1853 Texas Capital Building.

Northwest Park swimming pool consists of a kiddie pool, 50 meter lap lanes, a high dive diving board and 12 foot deep diving well.

- Gullett Elementary Park and Playground

Gullett Elementary on Treadwell Boulevard opened in 1956, Gullett Playground followed in 1962. It has seven ball fields, a sixth of a mile running track and three playgrounds.

- Lucy Read Elementary School Park

Lucy Read has three playgrounds, a covered basketball court and two soccer fields.

- Northwest Recreation Center

Northwest Recreation Center opened in 1979 and was named for the area of town for which it is located. The center contains: full court gymnasium, fitness studio, arts and crafts room, meeting room, multi-purpose room, teen room and a lobby with free wifi, ping pong, chess and foosball. Located on the grounds are: playscape, large grassy field, sand volleyball court, disc golf basket, horseshoe pit, and picnic tables.

- Great Northern Dog Park

Great Northern Dog Park is a mixed-use recreational area composed of a dam and retention ponds. It contains a large off-leash area for dogs, a small parking area, and multiple mixed-use paths. One of those paths connects to the Far West Blvd. / MoPac interchange via a pedestrian bridge over Great Northern Blvd.

== Education ==
Allandale is entirely located in the Austin Independent School District. A majority of the neighborhood is served by Gullett Elementary School, but the southernmost portion is zoned to Highland Park Elementary School. All of Allandale attends Lamar Middle School and McCallum High School. Lamar opened on Burnet Road in 1955; its design by Kuehne, Brooks, and Barr was exhibited nationally and internationally. McCallum, the second oldest high school in the Austin Independent School District, opened in 1953 to relieve growth in north and northwest Austin. The school was named after AISD's first high school superintendent, A.N. McCallum. Despite serving the entirety of Allandale, it is not in the neighborhood itself, being located in neighboring Brentwood.

Allandale Zoned Public Schools
School	Established	Principal	Enrollment	Coordinates	Notes
Gullett Elementary	1956	Tammy Thompson	534	30°20′37.35″N 97°44′55.31″W	
Highland Park Elementary	1952	Katie Pena	651	30°19′50.01″N 97°45′35.88″W	
Lamar Middle	1955	Travis Brunner	1,100	30°20′16.2″N 97°44′26.23″W	
McCallum High	1953	Andy Baxa	1,861	30°19′33.47″N 97°43′48.74″W	
