= Brentwood, Austin, Texas =

Coordinates: 30°20′24″N 97°43′51″W

Brentwood
- Neighborhood
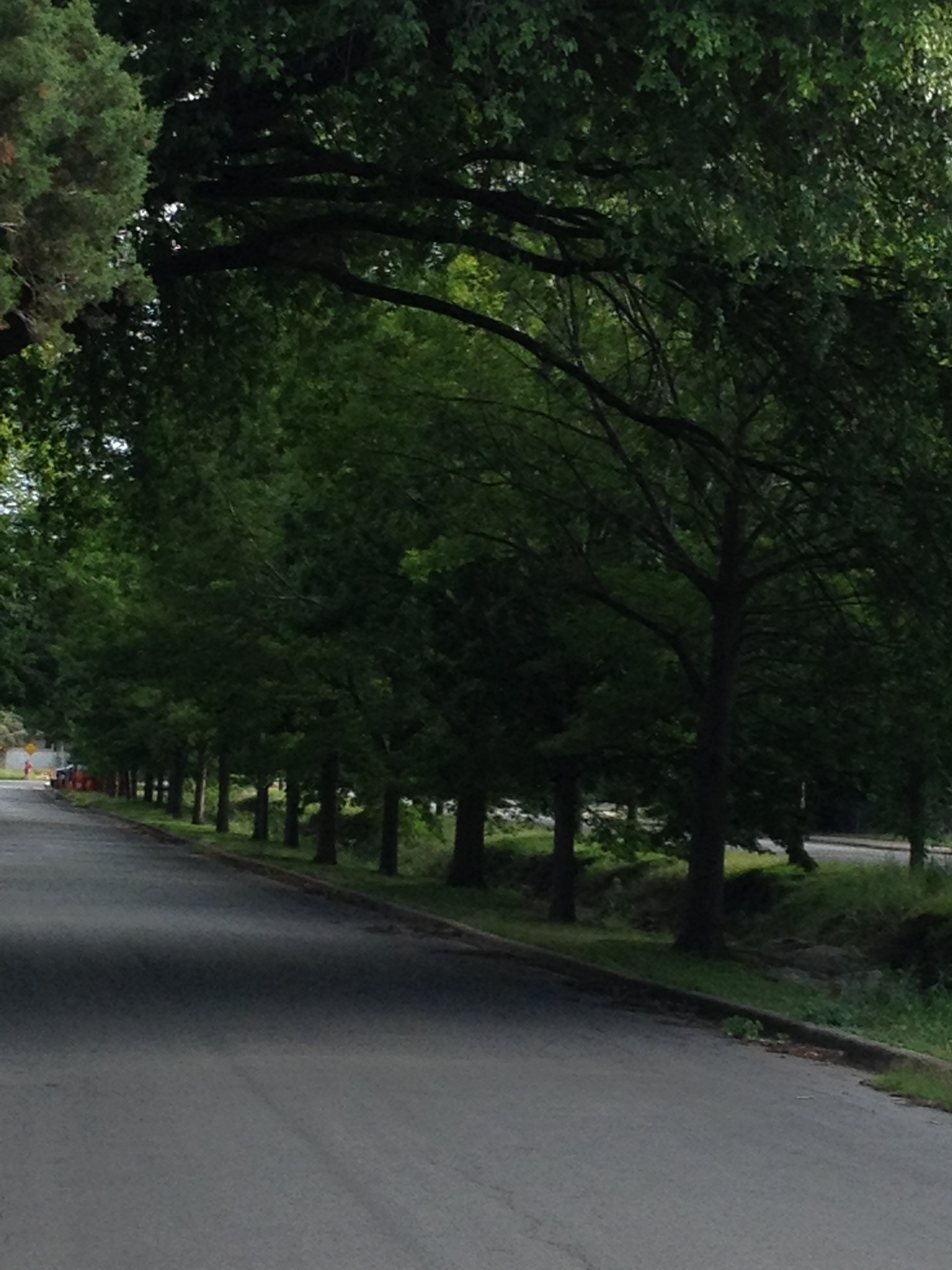
- Arroyo Seco
- Interactive map of Brentwood
- Country: United States
- State: Texas
- City: Austin
- Time zone: UTC-6 (CST)
  - Summer (DST): UTC-5 (CDT)
- ZIP Codes: 78756, 78757
- Area codes: 512, 737

Brentwood is a neighborhood in central Austin, Texas.

Brentwood comprises United States Census tracts 15.05 and 2.05, and ZIP Codes 78756 and 78757. The area is bordered by Burnet Road and Allandale to the west, North Lamar Boulevard and North Loop on the east, 45th Street and Rosedale to the south, and Justin Lane and Crestview to the north. Running through the middle of the area is a tree-lined street named Arroyo Seco, which follows a creek of the same name.

The neighborhood of Brentwood in north central Austin was originally a cotton farm until the late 1940s when the City of Austin annexed the land and land was purchased to build a school, Brentwood Elementary, which opened in the early 1950s. Brentwood Park opened that same year. Many of the homes in Brentwood are bungalow style. Bungalows are normally one and a half stories and have a low pitched roof and horizontal shape. Many of the bungalows were two and three bedrooms and were purchased by GIs who desired to start families after World War II.

Brentwood is located entirely within City Council District 7.

== Demographics ==
According to the 2000 census, 86% of the Brentwood population is over the age of 18, and the average household size is 1.9 persons. Only 17% of the population is over the age of 65. Forty-five percent of the neighborhood's residents are from 25 to 44 years of age, and 50% of the homes occupied in Brentwood are one-person households. Just over 20% of the neighborhood's total population are Hispanic American or Latino, while 74% of Brentwood's population are White, 1.8% are Asian, and 2.3% are Black or African American.

Among people over age 25, approximately 57% have a bachelor's degree or higher, while 28% percent are currently enrolled in graduate school. The median family income, according to the 2000 census was $42,616. Only 5% of Brentwood residents work outside Travis County. The average drive time to work for residents who work outside the home is 17.5 minutes. Ten percent of residents carpool, and five percent use public transportation. The 2000 Census also reported just over 4,275 housing units in Brentwood, mostly single-family homes. Large, modern apartment complexes and condominiums are located on most of the district's primary and secondary thoroughfares, many of which are home to young professionals and students attending the University of Texas.

== Recreation ==
Brentwood is divided by a wide median creek on which stand many large trees on Arroyo Seco. These 150 trees were planted in February 1993. Nearby popular attractions include the 120-foot (37 m) mosaic Wall of Welcome, which was completed and dedicated in March 2008.

Public open space includes Brentwood Park, spanning just over 9 acres (3.6 ha), with tennis courts, soccer fields, baseball diamonds and a playscape. Only 1% of the Brentwood neighborhood is public open space, but plans for the neighborhood include a neighborhood dog park at a location yet to be decided. Brentwood is known for its native old-fashioned bars and hamburger joints, some of which date to the 1930s. Threadgill's was frequented by Janis Joplin when she attended the University of Texas in the 1960s. Local traditions include annual events sponsored by the neighborhood nonprofit Violet Crown Community Works, which helped raise funds to make the Wall of Welcome possible, and the annual holiday decoration of the canal along Arroyo Seco with luminarias.

== Education ==
=== Public schools ===
Brentwood is located in the Austin Independent School District.

- Brentwood Elementary School
- Lamar Middle School
- McCallum High School

=== Private schools ===
- Austin Classical School (Woodrow & Alegria)
- Redeemer Lutheran School (located within the same zip code 78757)
- Brentwood Christian School (now located at 11908 N. Lamar Boulevard, between Braker Ln. & Yager Ln.)
- Petite Ecole Internationale
- The Oakmont School
- CS Lewis Hall
- Northwest Montessori House of Children
- Paragon Preparatory
- Shoreline Christian School
