= North Shoal Creek, Austin, Texas =

Neighborhood of Austin, Texas

Coordinates: 30.3653°N 97.7335°W

Neighborhood map

North Shoal Creek is a neighborhood in north-central Austin, Texas, established in the 1960s.

North Shoal Creek comprises United States Census tract 18.17 and ZIP code 78757 in Travis County and is named after Shoal Creek, which flows through the neighborhood.

The area is bordered by Mopac to the west, Research Blvd on the North, Burnet Road to the East and Anderson Lane on the South, located in the north part of the City of Austin's Urban Core and increasingly popular North Burnet Road Area. The North Shoal Creek neighborhood borders the following neighborhoods: Allandale (to the south), Wooten (to the east), North Burnet (to the north) and Northwest Hills (to the west).

Centrally located in between Mopac Expressway/Loop 1 (to the west) and 183/Research Blvd. (to the north), the North Shoal Creek neighborhood has an area of 1.179 square miles (3.1 km^{2}) and a population of 4,302 or 0.6% of Austin's population.

The neighborhood area is pedestrian friendly and integrates bus routes, biking trails and sidewalks. It is located next to retail and recreational facilities, many of which are local businesses. According to the website Walk Score, North Shoal Creek is the 14th most walkable neighborhood in Austin; the neighborhood scores Very Walkable with an average Walk Score of 74, scoring 21 points higher than Austin's overall Walk Score of 49.

North Shoal Creek is located within City Council District 7.

== Notable Events ==
In 1976 Jimmy Buffett wrote Margaritaville about a drink he discovered at Lung's Cocina del Sur restaurant (where High 5 is located today) at 2700 W. Anderson Lane in Austin, Texas.

== Demographics ==
According to the 2010 census-year, 87% of the North Shoal Creek's population is over the age of 18, and the average household size is 1.8 persons. A total of 15% of the population is over the age of 65. Forty percent of the neighborhood's residents are from 25 to 44 years of age, and 50% of the homes occupied in North Shoal Creek are one-person households. 18% of the neighborhood's total population are Hispanic American or Latino, 82% of North Shoal Creek's population are White Non-Hispanic, 3.4% are Asian, and 4.7% are Black or African American.

Forty-seven percent of the population work in a management, professional or related occupation. Twenty-eight percent of the population work in educational, health and social services and another 13% working in professional, scientific, management, administrative, and waste management services. Among people over age 25, approximately 44% have a bachelor's degree or higher; 48% percent of the population is currently enrolled in college or graduate school. The median family income, according to the 2010 census was $72,292.

Five percent of North Shoal Creek residents work outside Travis County. The average drive time to work for residents who work outside the home is 20 minutes. Eight percent of residents carpool, four percent walk to work and seven percent use public transportation.

According to Zillow.com, people that live in the neighborhood can be described as:

Stable Nuclears — Higher-income urban families who are middle-age, pulling in combined household incomes nearing six figures. Most own their own homes. Some have a college education and work in a variety of occupations, including management-level positions.

Makin' It Singles — Upper-scale urban singles who are pre-middle-age to middle-age with upper-scale incomes. May or may not own their own home. Most have college educations and are employed in mid-management professions.

Carefree Urban Couples — Younger married couples without children living in the city. Most own their own homes. Education varies from high school to college with some holding mid-management positions.

The neighborhood also has a non-profit, all-volunteer neighborhood association called the North Shoal Creek Neighborhood Association (NSCNA) whose purpose is to promote and protect the quality of life, safety, residential characteristics and property values of the North Shoal Creek neighborhood and surrounding areas.

== Housing ==
As of 2010, there were just over 2,247 housing units in North Shoal Creek, 796 are detached single-family homes. The neighborhood is mainly made up of ranch homes built in the early 1960s to the early to mid-1970s. Newly renovated apartment complexes and condominiums are located in the areas primary and secondary thoroughfares, many of which are home to young professionals and retirees.

== Education ==
Public schools

North Shoal Creek is located in the Austin Independent School District.

Pillow Elementary School
Pillow Elementary School was built in 1969, Pillow Elementary School serves a diverse student body of Pre-K through fifth graders and feeds into Burnet Middle School and Anderson High School. It also won the 2004 National Blue Ribbon School award.
