= Lake Flato Architects =

American architectural firm

Practice information
- Founders: Ted Flato, David Lake
- Founded: 1984
- Location: San Antonio

Significant works and honors
- Awards: 2004 AIA Firm of the Year Award

Website
- https://lakeflato.com

Lake Flato Architects, also stylized as Lake|Flato, is an American architectural firm based in San Antonio, founded by Ted Flato and David Lake in 1984. The firm's portfolio includes residences, schools, hotels, interior design, and cultural centers. One of the most distinguished architectural firms in the United States, the firm was awarded the Architecture Firm of the Year Award from the American Institute of Architects in 2004.

The firm's work has been featured in the New York Times, Architectural Digest, Time Magazine, among other publications.

== History ==
Lake Flato was founded in 1984 by architects Ted Flato and David Lake. Since its founding, the firm has grown to a staff of over 150, including 50 registered architects and 42 LEED-accredited professionals.

In 2016, the firm opened its Austin office, its first expansion outside of San Antonio in over 30 years, which focuses exclusively on urban redevelopment projects in Austin.

== Notable works ==
- The Holdsworth Center, Austin
- Montgomery Park, Portland
- AT&T Center, San Antonio
- Livestrong Foundation Headquarters, Austin
- Georgia Tech Krone Engineered Biosystems Building, Atlanta
- Congregation Agudas Achim, Austin
- World Birding Center Headquarters, Mission
- Government Canyon Visitor Center, Helotes
- Redevelopment of Pearl Brewing Company
- The Holdsworth Center

== Awards ==
Lake Flato has received over 300 design awards. Most notably, the firm was awarded the Architecture Firm of the Year Award from the American Institute of Architects in 2004. In 2013, the firm received the Global Award for Sustainable Architecture, and in 2014, Lake Flato was inducted into the Interior Design Magazine Hall of Fame. The firm placed first in Architect Magazine’s 2019 Top 50 — an annual ranking of the best U.S. firms — and was named one of the Ten Most Innovative Architecture Firms in the World by Fast Company.

In 2024, Lake Flato's founders won the American Institute of Architects's 2024 Gold Medal award, an award reserved for individuals who make a lasting impression on the design industry.
