= Crestview, Austin, Texas =

Coordinates: 30°20′24″N 97°43′51″W

Crestview
- Neighborhood
- Interactive map of Crestview
- Country: United States
- State: Texas
- City: Austin
- Time zone: UTC-6 (CST)
  - Summer (DST): UTC-5 (CDT)
- ZIP Codes: 78757
- Area codes: 512, 737

Crestview, Austin, Texas is a neighborhood in north central Austin, in the U.S. state of Texas.

Crestview is located in ZIP code 78757. The Crestview neighborhood was built by developer A.B. Beddow on the site of an old dairy farm in the 1950s and early 1960s. Crestview is bordered by Wooten and West Anderson Lane to the north, Allandale and Burnet Road to the west, Brentwood and Justin Lane to the south, and the Highland neighborhood and North Lamar Boulevard to the east. It is located north of the city's urban core.

Some local icons have deep roots, including the former Minimax grocery store (est. 1953, now an Arlan's) while other landmarks such as the 120-foot (37 m) mosaic Wall of Welcome (March 2008) are more recent arrivals. The neighborhood largely residential. It is filled with single-family bungalows, mid-century ranch homes and apartments. The Crestview Station, located at North Lamar and Airport Boulevard, is a commuter rail station for Austin's Capital MetroRail that opened in 2010. The station prompted the construction of a new mixed-use development known as Midtown Commons.

Crestwood is located entirely within City Council District 7.

== Demographics ==
According to data from the U.S. Census Bureau, the median age in Crestview is 35.7 years and the median family income is more than $54,000 a year. Forty-six percent of Crestview residents are married, about 30 percent are single, about 15 percent are divorced, and about 9 percent are widowed. More than 80 percent of the neighborhood's households are childless.

== Real estate trends ==
As of June 21, 2013 the Crestview neighborhood has seen a 19% increase in year over year sales volume. Inventory rates remain very low with a total of 3 months' worth of homes currently listed for sale and an average Days on Market of less than 20 days. Foreclosures and/or distressed sales are uncommon in this market given the high demand. Conventional financing makes up roughly 75% of all residential real estate transactions. Typical single-family homes range from $240,000 to $290,000 with a high of over $600,000.

== Education ==
=== Public schools ===
Crestview is located in the Austin Independent School District.

- Brentwood Elementary School
- Lamar Middle School
- McCallum High School
