= Congregation Agudas Achim (Austin, Texas) =

Conservative Jewish synagogue in Texas, US

Agudas Achim
- Location in Texas

Religion
- Affiliation: Conservative Judaism
- Ecclesiastical or organisational status: Synagogue
- Leadership: Rabbi Neil Blumofe; Rabbi Gail Swedroe
- Status: Active

Location
- Location: 7300 Hart Lane, Northwest Hills, Austin, Texas
- Country: United States
- Administration: United Synagogue of Conservative Judaism
- Coordinates: 30°21′27″N 97°45′26″W

Architecture
- Architect: David Lake (2001)
- Type: Synagogue
- Established: 1914 (as a congregation)
- Completed: 1920s (San Jacinto); 1963 (Bull Creek Road); 2001 (Hart Lane)
- Materials: Wood and limestone

Website
- theaustinsynagogue.org

Congregation Agudas Achim is a Conservative synagogue located in the Northwest Hills neighborhood of Austin, Texas, in the United States.

== History ==
Agudas Achim (Community of Brothers) was founded in 1914 by a group of Orthodox Jews who met for prayer in private homes. It was chartered in 1924 and occupied leased space before erecting a brick synagogue at 909 San Jacinto. The Agudas Achim Cemetery in Austin Memorial Park on Hancock Road was purchased in 1933. The congregation joined the United Synagogue of Conservative Judaism in 1948.

The congregation moved to a new building on Bull Creek Road, dedicated on December 30, 1963. U.S. Vice President Lyndon Baines Johnson was scheduled to the dedication, which was postponed while the congregation joined the nation in mourning the death of U.S. President John F. Kennedy. At the dedication, Jim Novy spoke about President Johnson's role in Operation Texas, a clandestine operation to use the power of the US government without formal sanction to help Eastern European Jews escape the Nazis.

This is thought to have made the congregation the second American synagogue dedicated by a president. The first was the Washington Hebrew Congregation which has had cornerstones laid or buildings dedicated by Presidents McKinley, Truman and Eisenhower. The undistinguished mid-century modern brick and glass building was renovated and upgraded in 1989.

In 2001, the congregation dedicated a modern building designed by David Lake. The wood and stone sanctuary is bathed in natural light that enters via a skylight. The rusticated limestone walls resemble Jerusalem stone (both visually and geologically) but the stone, like the members of the congregation, is "proudly Texan". The building is one of several religious institutions and community centers occupying the 40-acre Dell Jewish Community Campus in the Northwest Hills neighborhood of Austin.

In 2018 Jen Taylor Friedman completed the first full Torah written in Texas by a woman; the congregation had requested her to do it for them.
