= North Central Austin =

Area in downtown Austin, Texas

North Central Austin is a colloquial term referring to an area north of downtown Austin, Texas.

== Definitions ==
The City of Austin has no official definition of "North Central Austin". The Planning and Development Review Department divides Austin's core into neighborhood planning areas, which mostly correspond to the boundaries of just one or two well-established neighborhood associations. The Austin Police Department has defined six area commands, among them "Central West", "Central East", "Northwest" and "Northeast", none of which are recognizable as "North Central". Austin's Parks and Recreation Department in its October 6, 2010, draft of its Long Range Plan appears to have revised its planning area definition, with Planning Area 9 corresponding to an area defined by Mopac on the west, 183 to the north, I-35 to the east and 2222 to the south, plus part of the North Lamar/Georgian Acres Combined NPA north of 183, and part of the North Loop NPA south of 2222.

The Austin Board of Realtors in 2007 defined 25 "ACTRIS" regions to assist realtors and the public with identifying real estate. The North Central region runs from 2222 north all the way to 620 in Round Rock.

The civic organization Sustainable Neighborhoods of North Central Austin, which uses the term in its name, defines its territorial scope based on the boundaries of six neighborhood associations: Allandale, Brentwood, Crestview, Highland, North Shoal Creek, and Wooten. This definition mostly corresponds to a diamond of land bounded by the roads Mopac-183-I35-45th St. This part of Austin is undivided by highways, and shares a common architecture due to the prevalence of post-World War II single-family housing.
