= Jim Novy =

American businessman

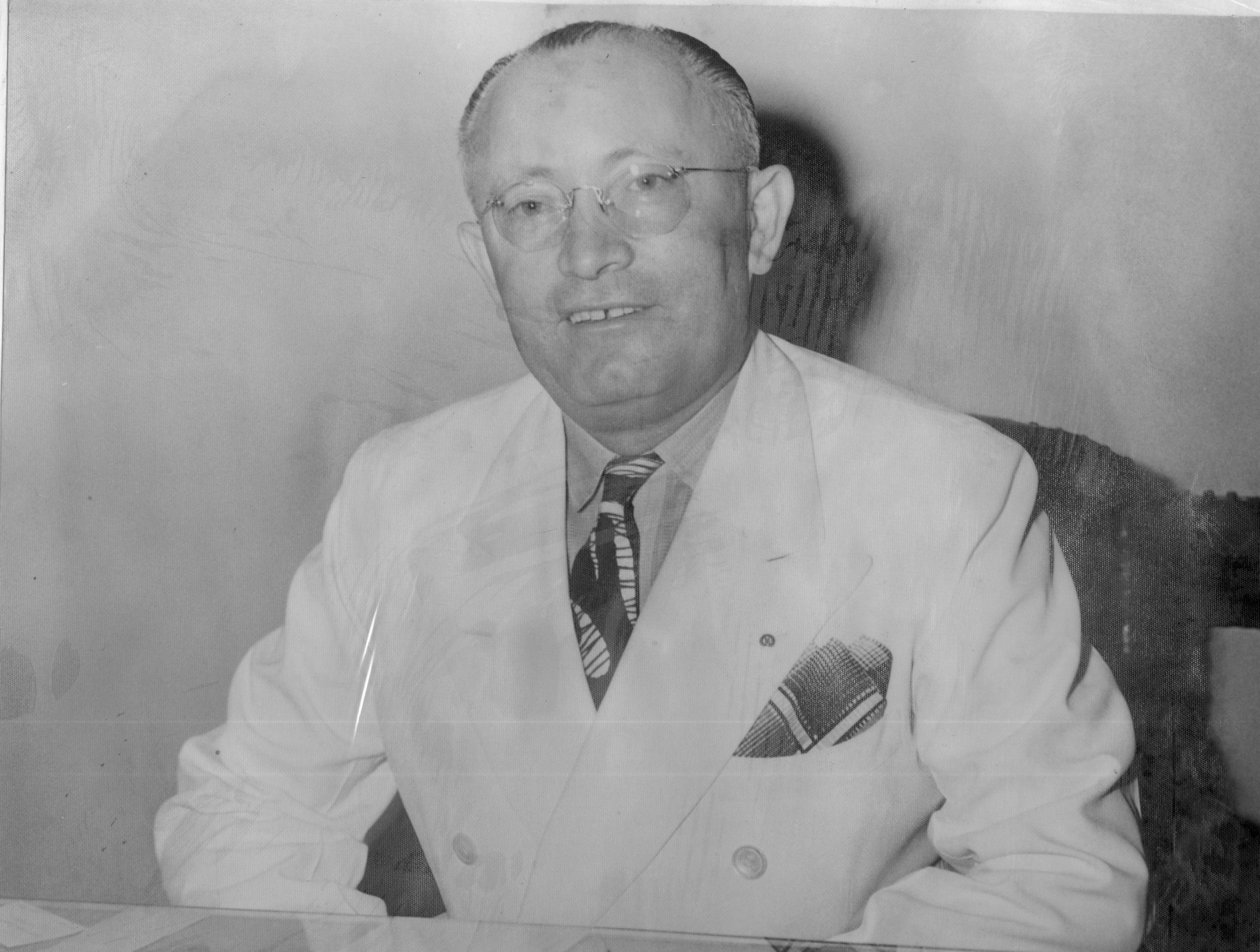
- Jim Novy c. 1940
- Born: Shimeon Novodvorsky; March 15, 1896; Knyszyn, Poland
- Died: May 31, 1971 (aged 75); Austin, Texas, United States
- Occupations: Businessman, entrepreneur, philanthropist
- Employer(s): Austin Metal and Iron, Co.
- Known for: A political lobbyist for Jewish causes abroad and in Texas, together with Lyndon B. Johnson they covertly aided Jewish immigration out of Europe before and during WWII.
- Spouse: Edna Goldstein (m. 1922, divorced) Estelle Fishbein (m. 1948)
- Children: 2

Jim Novy (March 15, 1896 – May 31, 1971) was an American businessman, entrepreneur, and philanthropist who was based in Austin, Texas. He immigrated to Texas from Poland alone as a teenager under the Galveston Plan with just a few dollars in his pocket. He became wealthy in the scrap metal business in Austin. He later became a philanthropist, partial to Jewish causes and became a patron to numerous political figures, most notably he supported the career of Lyndon B. Johnson.

He became notable figure in Austin politics with his power felt as far away as the White House and Israel. He was a Mason, Odd Fellow, Shriner, Knight of Pythias, a member of the board for the Boy Scouts of America, Director of the Austin Chamber of Commerce, and Director of the Salvation Army.

== Early life ==
Jim Novy, whose birth name was Shimeon Novodvorsky, grew up in Knyszyn, Poland. He was the son of Reb Eli Novodvorsky, a Jewish scholar, and Chaya Tserel Novodvorsky, a small goods store owner. He was one of 17 children in this poor Jewish family. He grew up attending Jewish school (Talmud Torah). In 1913, at the age of 17, he escaped Knyszyn alone and fled to America.

== Journey and arrival in America ==
He had a harrowing journey across Poland and sneaked across the Russian/Polish-German frontier at Grajewo. From there he took the train across Germany to Bremen. In Bremen he stayed in the Hotel Warsaw while he waited for a ship. On Sept. 17, 1913, he boarded the ship SS Chemnitz for his journey to America. He arrived in the port of Galveston on October 10, 1913, just in time for the Jewish holiday of Yom Kippur. With the assistance of Rabbi Henry Cohen he made transit from Galveston to Dallas to meet his older brothers Louis and Sam who had arrived a year earlier.

== Early years in America ==
Upon arrival, the three brothers established a business in Ennis, Texas, peddling junk. Jim bought a blind white mule and peddled from the mule cart in towns between Ennis and Dallas. By 1914 the brothers relocated their junk business to Austin. When World War I broke out in Europe that year, scrap metal prices skyrocketed. The brothers hit it big and became wealthy. So while still a teenager with very little English skills, Novy struck it rich in America. When World War I ended in 1918, Scrap metal prices tanked. Novy got into other ventures, one of which was movie theaters. His brother Sam died that year from the Influenza epidemic of 1918. His other brother Louis remained struggling in the scrap metal business. By the mid-1920s scrap metal prices recovered, but Louis's credit was no good. So the two swapped businesses - Louis took over the theater business and Jim became a scrap metal dealer again, where he remained for the rest of his life.

== Jewish community leadership ==
Novy was one of the early arrivals in Austin of Orthodox Jews from Eastern Europe. At the time he arrived the new orthodox community could barely support a minyan. Secularized Jews, mostly from Germany, made up most of Austin's Jewish population at the time, belonging to Reform Congregation Beth Israel. In 1924, Novy was one of four people who signed the charter of newly formed Congregation Agudas Achim - the second Jewish congregation in Austin and the orthodox alternative to Beth Israel. In 1931, Jim was the building chairman for Agudas Achim's new synagogue building constructed on 10th and San Jacinto in Austin. He was president of Congregation Agudas Achim three different times - 1937–1938, 1946–1948, and 1954–1955.

An ardent Zionist, Novy held several executive positions in the Zionist Organization of Texas. He had intended to visit the British Mandate of Palestine in 1938 but events in Europe interrupted his trip. In 1943, while he and LBJ were raising $65,000 in war bonds from local Jewish businessmen, it is rumored that funds were also raised to aid underground Jewish fighters in Palestine with covert shipments of arms in crates labeled "Texas Grapefruit".

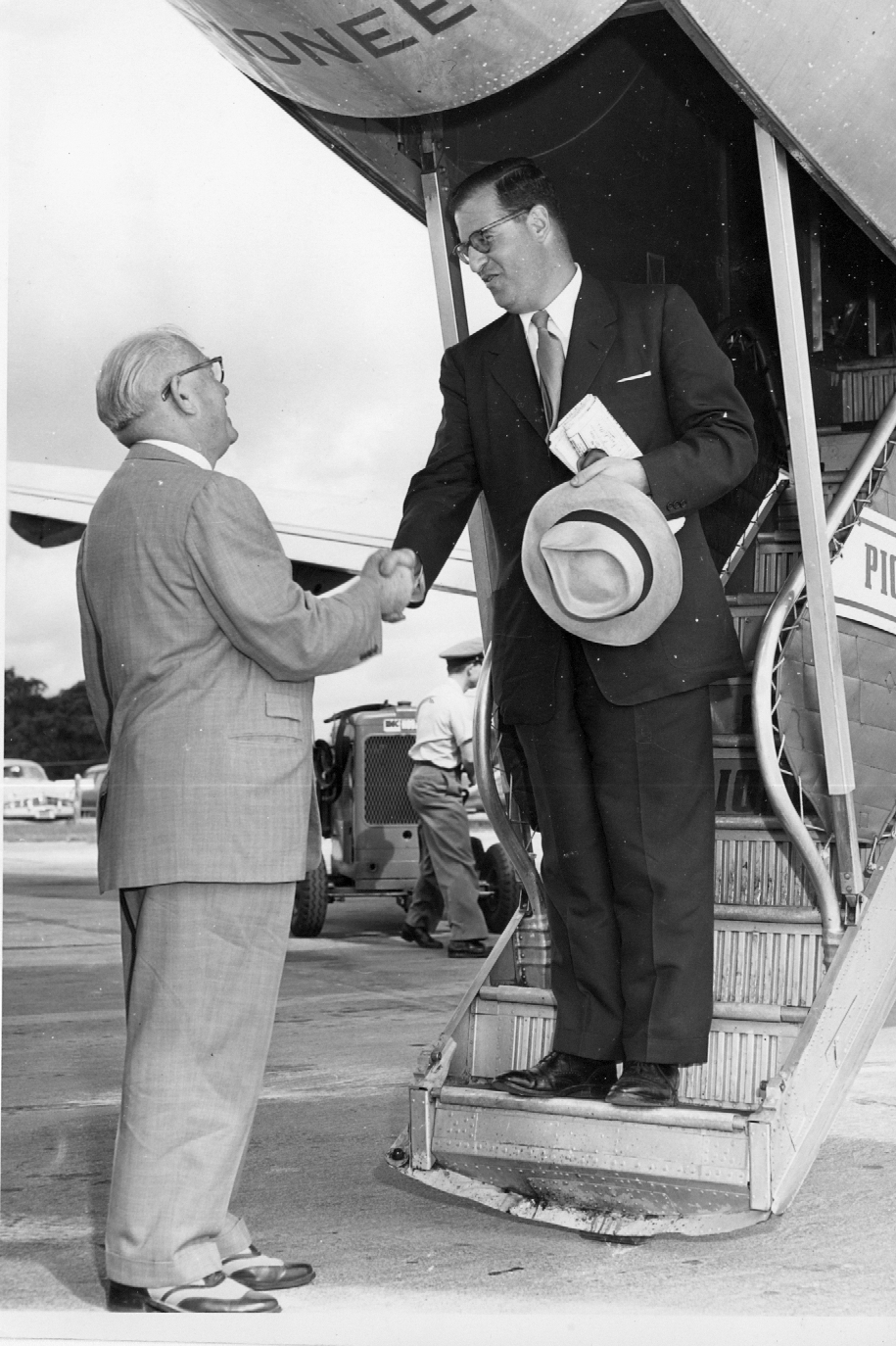
Jim Novy welcoming Israeli Ambassador Abba Eban outside his plane at Austin Mueller Airport

Novy met with key Jewish leaders of his day, including hosting Israeli Ambassador Abba Eban in Austin to meet with the Governor and local leaders in 1953.

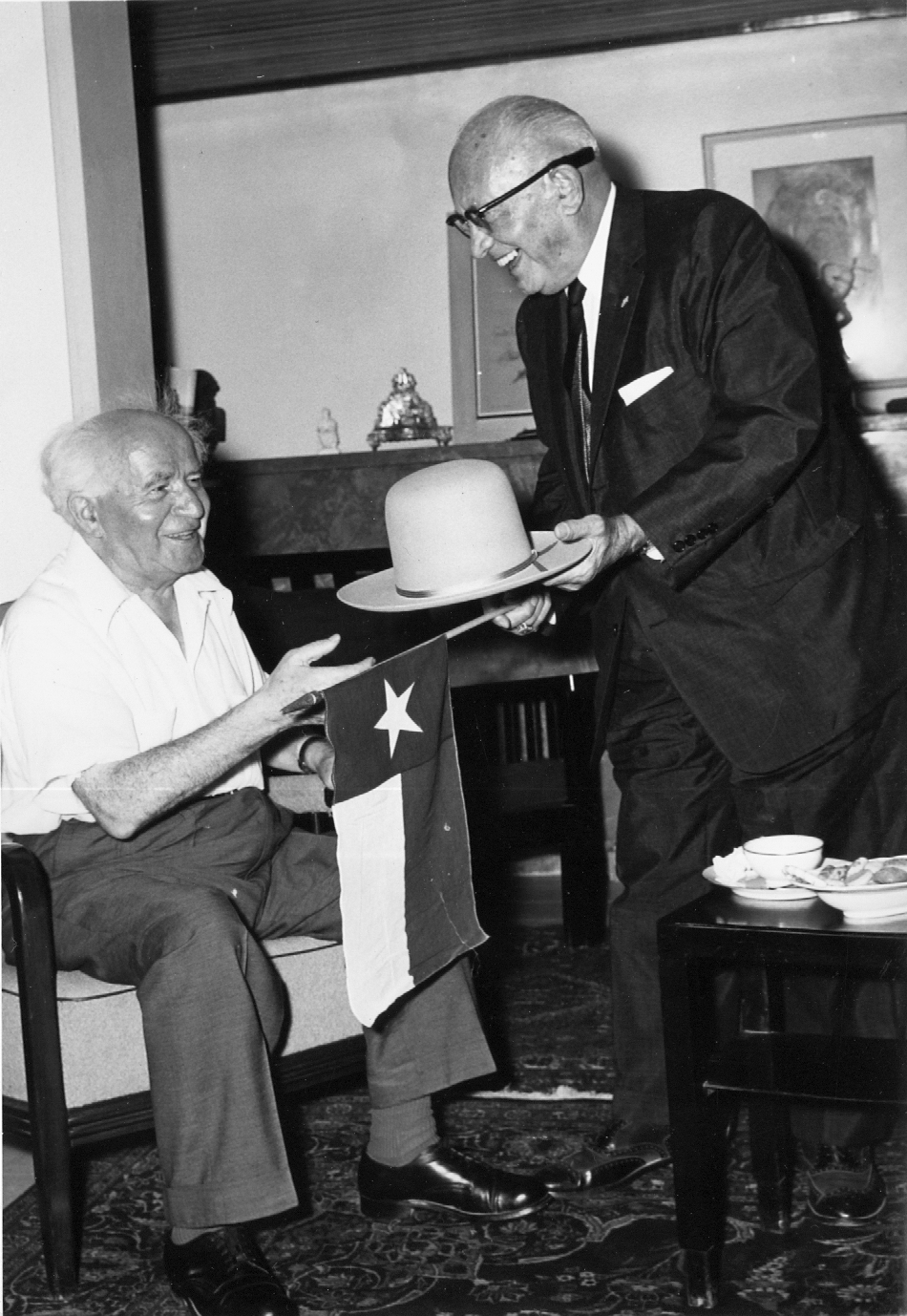
Jim Novy presenting Israeli Prime Minister David Ben Gurion with a Texas cowboy hat and flag

In 1958, as a personal representative of Texas Governor Price Daniel he met with Prime Minister David Ben Gurion in 1958 at the 10th anniversary of the establishment of the modern state of Israel.

Novy was a national leader with t he Zionist Organization of America, and was a key contributor to the Jewish National Fund.

== Holocaust rescues ==
Jim Novy was involved in rescuing perhaps hundreds of people from Europe under Nazi suppression. He got most of his family out of Europe, often through Latin America. In 1938, he made a harrowing journey across Nazi Germany to visit his hometown of Knyszyn. Armed with lots of cash and 42 blank visas, he helped restore the synagogue, established free loans to the needy, and he successfully got 42 people to America. He and his friend Lyndon B. Johnson saved numerous people under Operation Texas, which Jim Novy helped fund.

== Relationship with Lyndon Johnson ==
Jim Novy was one of Lyndon B. Johnson's (LBJ) great benefactors. Novy first met LBJ when LBJ was serving as assistant to Congressman Richard Kleberg. They became close when LBJ served as head of the National Youth Administration at the time Novy needed help placing European refugees; this collaboration between LBJ and Novy is referred to as Operation Texas. Novy and LBJ worked closely on many Jewish issues, particularly when LBJ was a senator in the early days of the state of Israel.

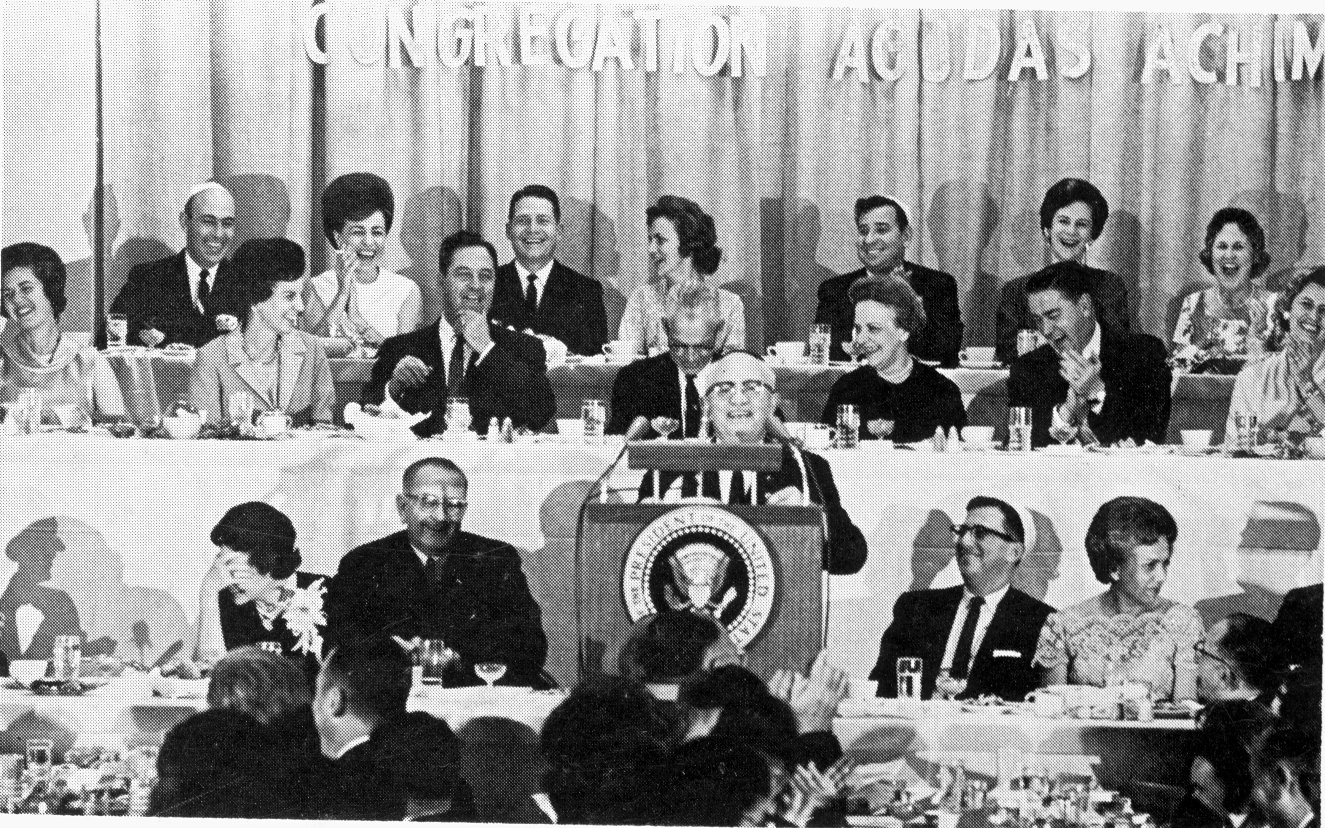
Jim Novy introducing his friend, President Johnson, at the Congregation Agudas Achim building dedication in 1963

In 1962, when LBJ was vice-president under John F. Kennedy, the federal government condemned the land that Congregation Agudas Achim synagogue was on in order to build a new government office building. Novy worked with LBJ to get a good price for the land. Once again, Jim Novy was in charge of another Agudas Achim Building committee. In September 1963 the building, located on Bull Creek Road, was almost completed. Using open topped automobiles, four Torahs were transported from the old synagogue to the new state-of-the-art building, including one which was driven using LBJ's personal limousine. Vice-president Johnson was scheduled to dedicate the new synagogue building on November 22, 1963. But when Kennedy was assassinated that very same afternoon while riding through Dallas in an open car, LBJ immediately becoming president couldn't attend the dedication. Remembering his promise to his friend Jim Novy, LBJ came to Austin on December 30, 1963, to dedicate the building. It was the first time that a sitting president dedicated a synagogue building. It was also LBJ's first public function after the assassination.

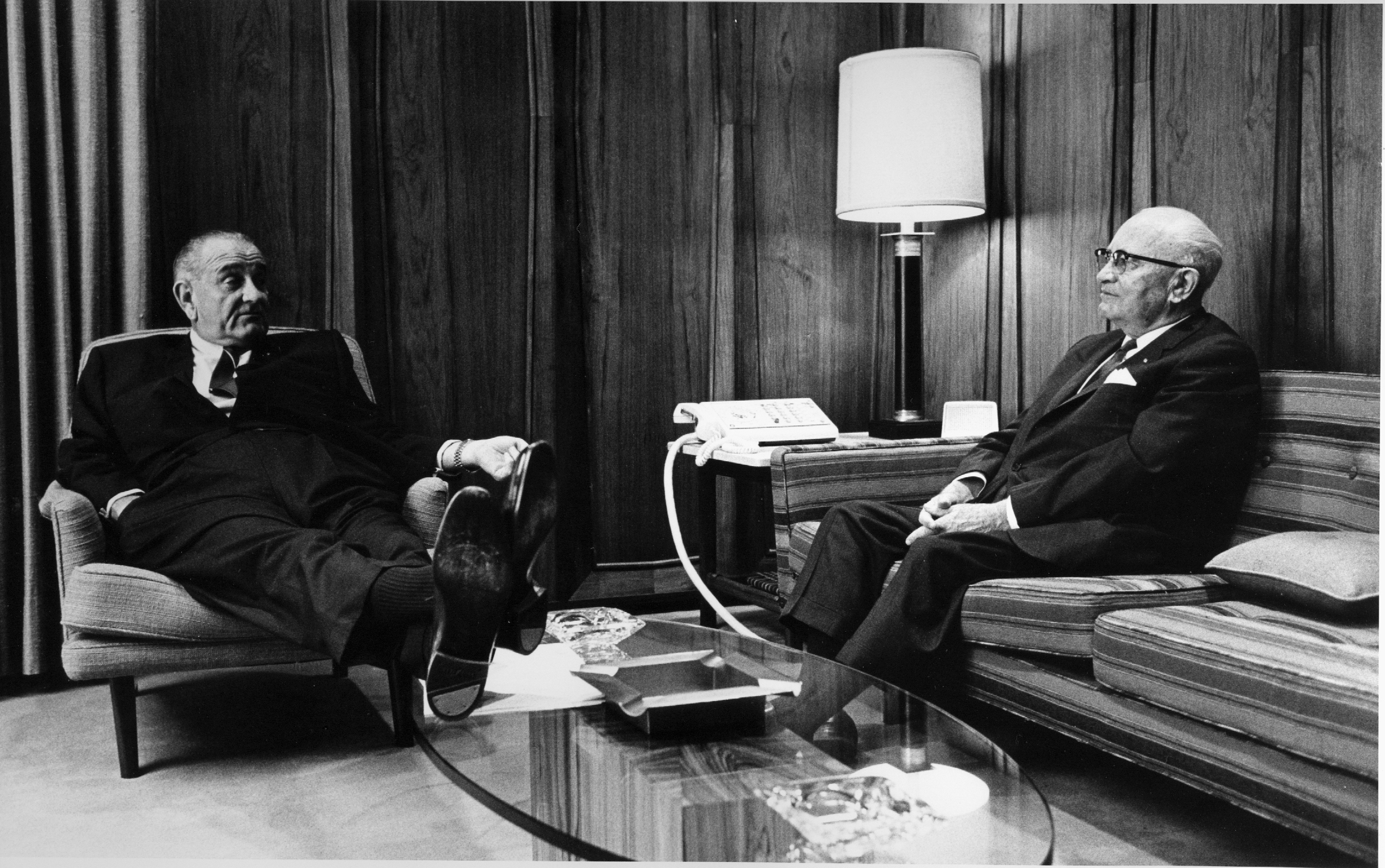
Jim Novy shares a personal moment with President Johnson in Novy's Austin office

After the dedication, Novy was invited to the White House numerous times as a personal guest of LBJ. He was even present at one point to help LBJ work on his state of the union address.

Late in LBJ's presidency, Novy managed to get White House support in providing financial aid for the publishing of the Encyclopaedia Judaica, occurring in 1972, the year after Novy's death in 1971. Lyndon and Lady Bird Johnson were in attendance for Novy's funeral dedication at Congregation Agudas Achim, the same Austin synagogue the two men had helped previously dedicate.

== Personal life ==
Jim Novy married Edna Goldstein of Fort Worth, Texas in 1922. He had two children, Dave Howard Novy in 1923 and Elaine Novy Shapiro in 1930. He divorced Edna and in 1948 he married Estelle Fishbein.
