= Wall of Welcome =

Public mosaic by Jean Graham in Austin, Texas, U.S.

- Artist: Jean Graham
- Year: 2008
- Type: Public Art, Mosaic
- Subject: History of Austin, Texas
- Dimensions: 1.8 m × 37 m (6 feet × 120 feet)
- Location: Austin, Texas, U.S.; 30.342688°N 97.7274788°W

The Wall of Welcome is a 120-foot-long community public art mosaic located at 7100 Woodrow Avenue in the Crestview neighborhood of Austin, Texas, United States. First envisioned by artist and Brentwood resident Jean Graham in 2002, the Wall reflects the community and documents some of the history of the Brentwood and Crestview neighborhoods. Fundraising for the wall began in 2003 with the first Violet Crown Festival. Jean and hundreds of neighbors worked together for five years to make the wall a reality; it was completed and dedicated in March 2008.

The 2008 short film A Community Mosaic, produced by Rob and Susan Burneson, tells the story of the creation of the Wall, along with the history and people of Brentwood and Crestview.

Barbara Lugge's book Wall of Welcome: A Neighborhood Project illustrates the wall and its individual tiles.

In 2025, Jean Graham published an excerpt from her (unpublished) memoir as a booklet, Grassroots & Violet Crowns: A Neighborhood Story relating the creation story of the Wall. In Jean's words:

A true story in the voice of an Austin artist who inspired her adjacent 1950s-era Texas neighborhoods to come together in the creation of their own public art. Aging long-time residents, new transplants to the area, and children engaged in the creative process – bringing to life the shared history of the Brentwood and Crestview neighborhoods. Their enthusiastic response and collaborative efforts over a five-year period (2003-2008) fueled the funding and completion of enduring artwork. The added bonus was a stronger sense of community, a new cultural identity, and the spontaneous appearance of neighborhood icons like Domino, the renegade, then mythical pig.
