= Knyszyn =

Town in Podlaskie Voivodeship, Poland

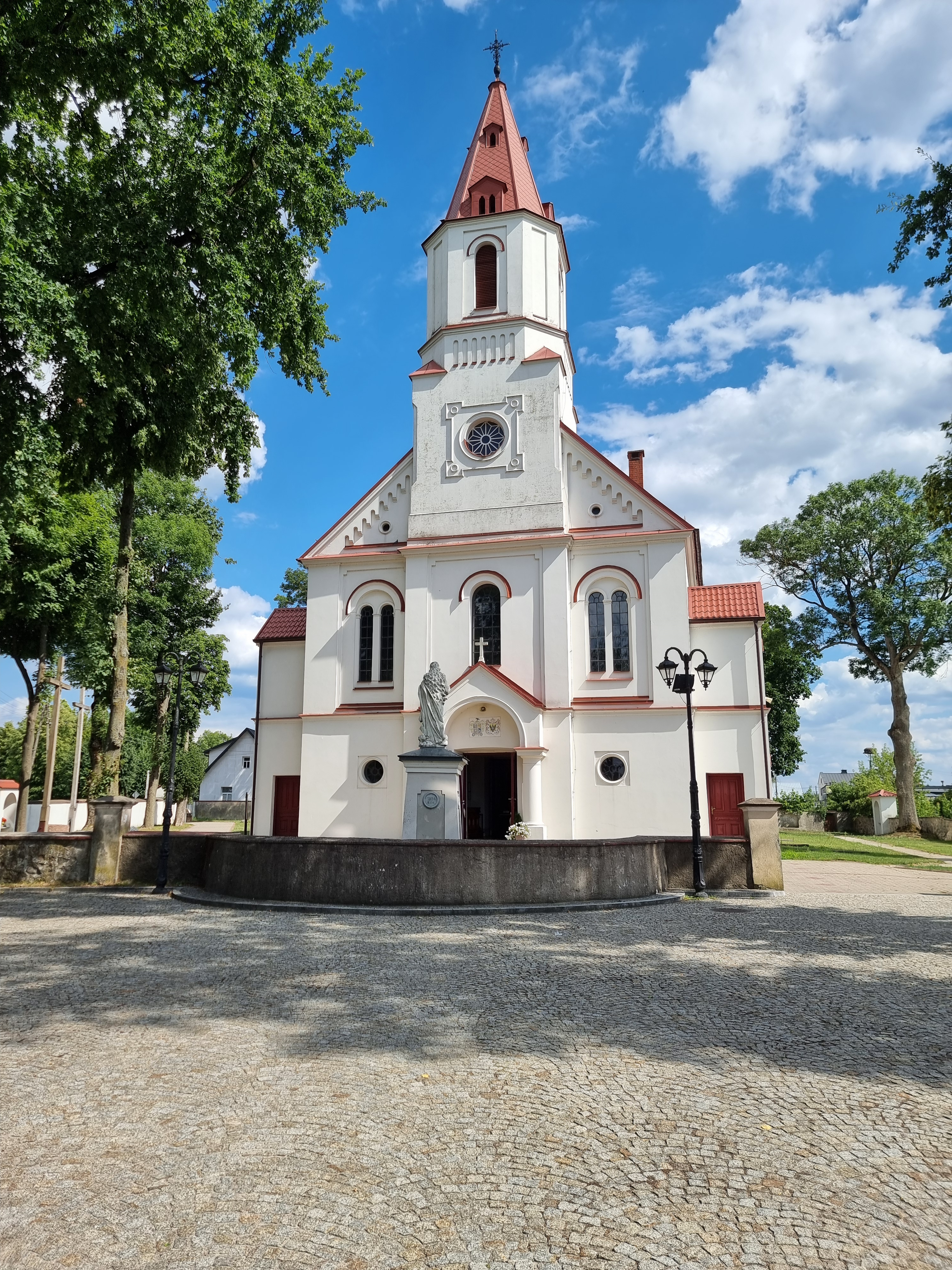
- Saint John church in Knyszyn

- Coat of arms

- Location within Poland
- Coordinates: 53°18′47″N 22°55′3″E
- Country: Poland
- Voivodeship: Podlaskie
- County: Mońki
- Gmina: Knyszyn
- Town rights: 1568

Area
  - Total: 3.68 km^{2} (1.42 sq mi)

Population (2006)
  - Total: 2,835
  - Density: 770/km^{2} (2,000/sq mi)
- Time zone: UTC+1 (CET)
  - Summer (DST): UTC+2 (CEST)
- Postal code: 19-120
- Area code: +48 85
- Car plates: BMN

Knyszyn [ˈknɨʂɨn] (Note: Yiddish: קנישין, romanized: Knishin, Lithuanian: Knišinas) is a town in the Podlaskie Voivodeship, in north-eastern Poland, 26 kilometres (16 miles) northwest of Białystok. It is situated on the Jaskranka River, within the historic region of Podlachia. A former royal town of Poland, it once housed a royal residence of King Sigismund II Augustus.

== History ==
In 1358 the territory became part of the Grand Duchy of Lithuania, soon afterwards in personal union with Poland. It was the property of Court Marshal of Lithuania Michael Glinski until confiscated and passed to the Grand Chancellor of Lithuania Mikołaj Radziwiłł in 1507. In 1569 it was re-incorporated into the Kingdom of Poland by the Privilege of restoration of Podlasie land to the Polish Crown.

=== Royal residence of King Sigismund II Augustus ===
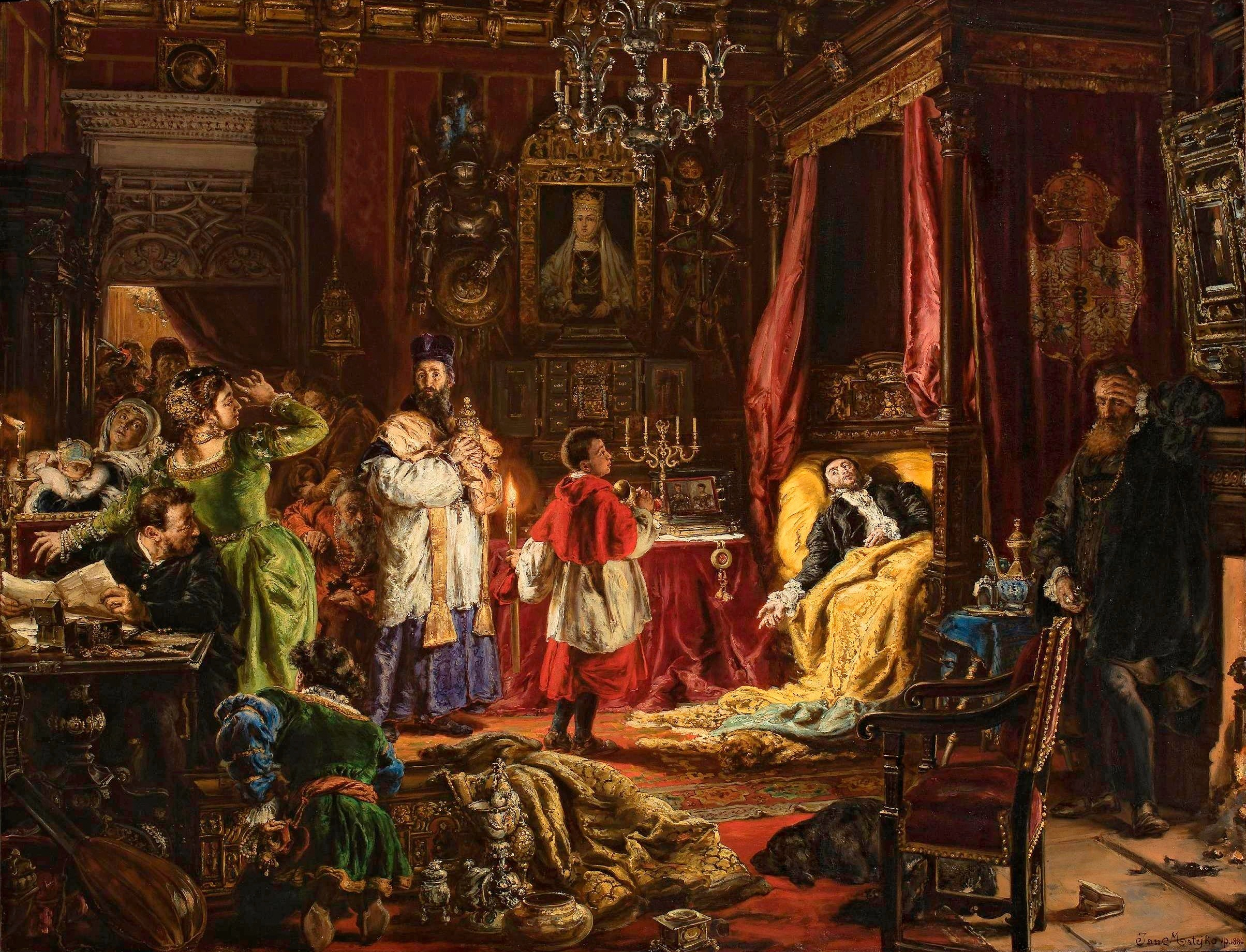
Death of King Sigismund Augustus, 19th-century painting by Jan Matejko

In 1568 Polish King Sigismund II Augustus granted Knyszyn town rights, and subsequently a town hall, public baths and a weigh house were built. Knyszyn was the favorite residence of the King, and was the Polish court's main base for hunting expeditions into the nearby virgin forests. In the 1560s the king maintained a royal stud of over 3000 horses in Knyszyn, including large numbers of Arabian horses, among the first to be bred in northern Europe. Sigismund II died in the town in 1572, after which the royal property rapidly fell into neglect. Few signs of the former royal residence and extensive studs remain aside from foundations, which are poorly marked.

According to a legend, the heart of King Sigismund II is buried in the underground crypts of the church of St. John, which was built in the years 1579-1601 by the Great Crown Hetman Jan Zamoyski, who became starost of Knyszyn in 1574. A monument of the king is located at the Market Square and the town's coat of arms contains the king's royal monogram.

=== History since the 17th century ===
Manor ruins in Knyszyn in the 19th century, painting by Napoleon Orda

Knyszyn was a royal town of Poland, administratively located in the Bielsk County in the Podlaskie Voivodeship in the Lesser Poland Province. In 1630, Polish prince and soon-to-be King Władysław IV Vasa stayed in Knyszyn. The town was devastated during the Polish–Swedish wars. As a result of the Third Partition of Poland in 1795 it was annexed by Prussia; in 1807 it was annexed by Russia. At that time, many Jews settled in Knyszyn, as a result of the discriminatory Russian regulations (Pale of Settlement), while the Polish population was subject to repressions and Russification policies. Local Poles took part in various Polish uprisings during the partition period. Knyszyn became part of Poland again after the country has regained independence in 1918.

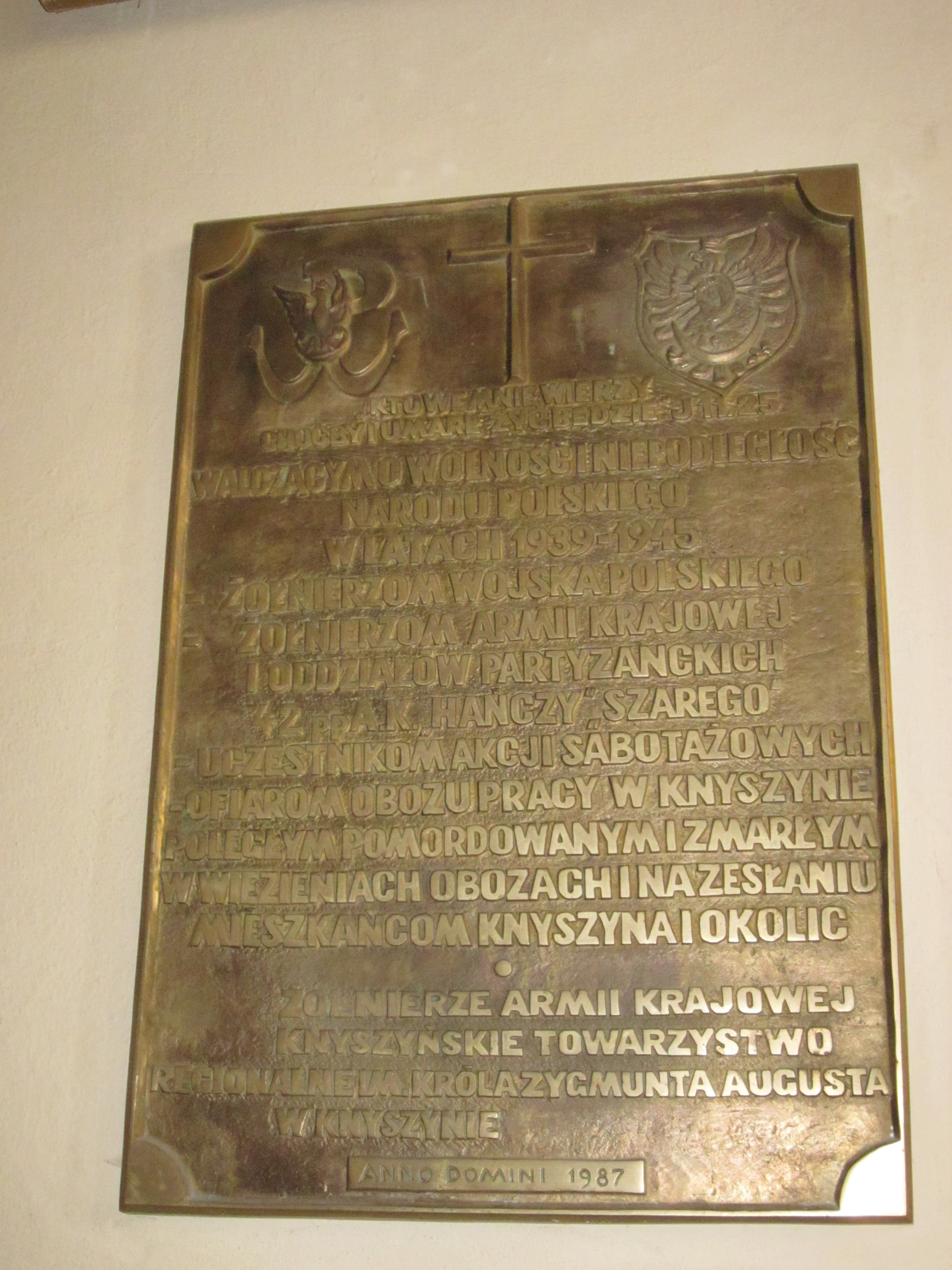
Memorials to victims of World War II, including victims of the local forced labour camp, local deportees, and victims of a German-perpetrated massacre from 1942

During World War II it was occupied by the Soviet Union (1939–1941) and Nazi Germany (1941–1944). The population was subjected to various repressions and crimes. The Soviets devastated farm buildings and the royal garden, and closed down both Polish and Jewish schools, and opened a Russian school instead. The Germans established and operated a forced labour camp in the town. Its prisoners were initially Soviet prisoners of war, and afterwards Poles from the town and region, often captured in roundups, some of whom were soon deported to forced labour to Germany. Knyszyn had a Jewish population of nearly 2,000 until Nazi Germany invaded the area, after which most of Knyszyn's Jews were killed. On 1 May 1944, the Polish underground Home Army liberated a group of prisoners from German captivity in Knyszyn.

Afterwards, the town was restored to Poland, although with a Soviet-installed communist regime, which stayed in power until the Fall of Communism in the 1980s. The Polish anti-communist resistance was active in Knyszyn. In 1945–1947, the resistance carried out three raids on the local communist police station. The Szeregi Młodzieżowe (Youth Ranks) resistance organization was founded in Knyszyn.

Until 1998, it was administratively located in the Białystok Voivodeship (1975-1998).

=== Jewish history ===
The history of Jews in the town may date back as far as October 1605 when a Jew from Moscow sued the town over a beating he had endured. However, during the mid 1600s the town passed a law forbidding Jews to live in the town. Despite this decree a small Jewish community had settled in Knyszyn by 1679 and in 1705 a synagogue was built. In 1719 an agreement was reached between the Jewish community and the Church, requiring the former to pay a tax annually, with additional levees on several holidays. In exchange for this the exclusionary law was formally repealed.

By the early 1800s (1807) the Jewish population had reached 308. In 1810 an attempt was made to expel them but was quickly cancelled when the town economy collapsed. The Jews continued to benefit the Knyszyn economy by developing a textile industry during the 1830s. This helped support the burgeoning Jewish population which consisted of 1878 (out of a total town population of 3864) in the 1879 census.

Immigration lowered the population so that in the 1921 Polish census it was recorded as 1235. During the 1920s and 30s the community supported four restaurants, two groceries, and seven bakeries. They owned three mills, a leather factory, and a service station. There were also branches of the Betar organization and the Hadema sports club, and many charities. The 1939 population of 1450 had increased to 2000 by 1941. Most of this growth came from refugees who reached Knyszyn- then under Soviet occupation- from German-occupied regions.

The town was first occupied by the Germans for several weeks of September 1939 and then by the Russians until June 1941. Shortly after the Nazi occupation a pogrom occurred as well as the burning alive of 200 Jews in a synagogue. In November 1942 a massacre of the remaining Jewish population was carried out by the Gestapo. Fifty Jews survived by hiding in the nearby woods. Most immigrated to Israel after the war. The above is from https://kehilalinks.jewishgen.org/Knyszyn/occupation.html

The Knyszyn Jewish cemetery was established in 1786. It is situated by the Jaskranka River on the former grounds of the royal ponds. While many of the gravestones were destroyed or looted during WWII, about 680 remain.

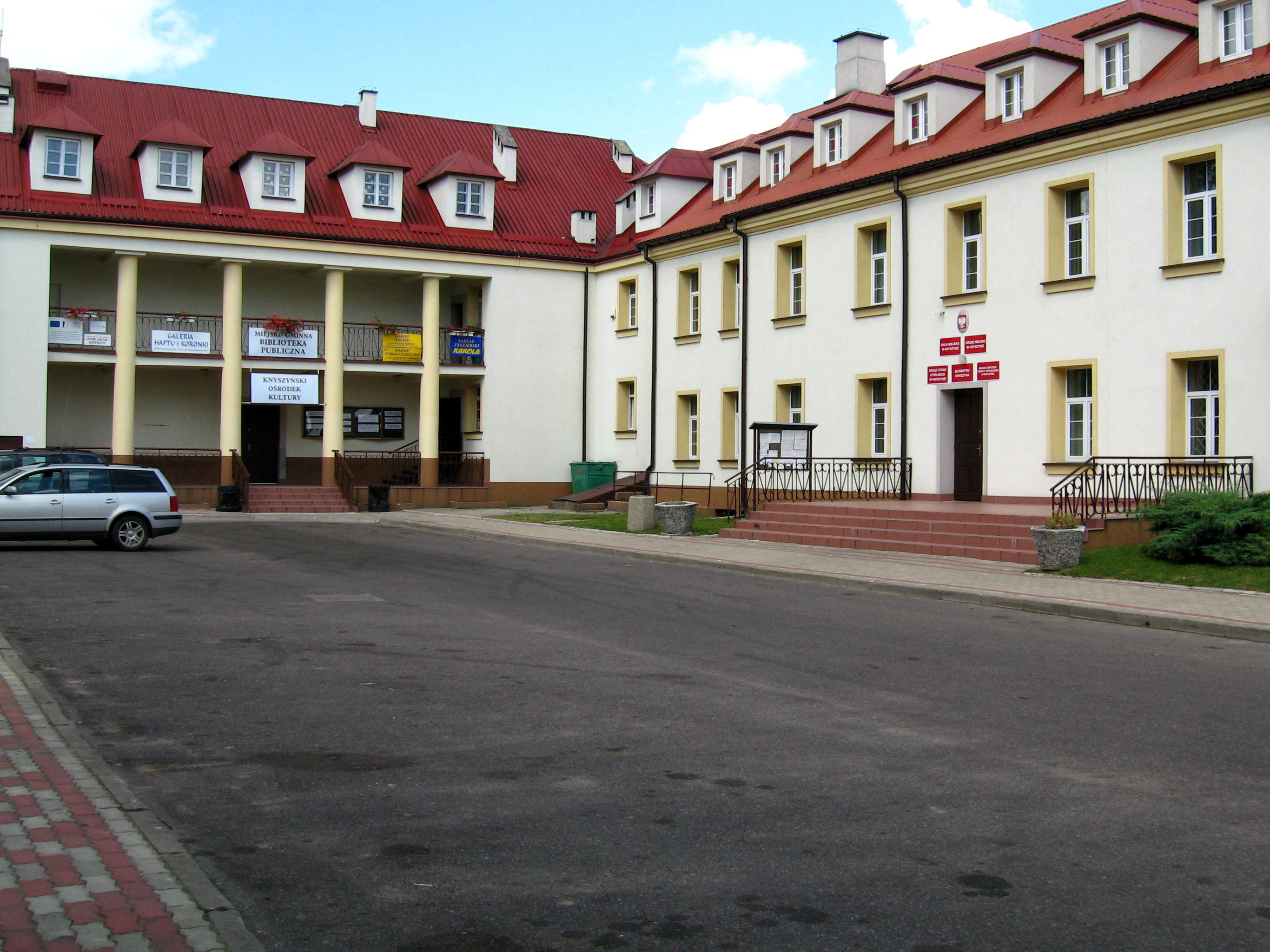
Municipal office

== Demographics ==
Historical population

Year	Pop.	±%
1880	2,790	—
1890	3,100	+11.1%
1897	3,376	+8.9%
1910	4,045	+19.8%
1921	3,579	−11.5%

Year	Pop.	±%
1931	4,123	+15.2%
1939	4,400	+6.7%
1950	2,879	−34.6%
1960	2,371	−17.6%

== Notable residents ==
- The town was the birthplace of Rabbi Shmuel Berenbaum (1920-2008), Rosh Yeshiva of the Mir Yeshiva in Brooklyn, New York.
- Jim Novy (1896 in Knyszyn–1971), Austin, Texas businessman, entrepreneur, and philanthropist.
- Category:People from Knyszyn
- pl:Kategoria:Ludzie związani z Knyszynem
