= David Lake (architect) =

American architect

David Lake is an American architect and principal in the Texas firm of Lake|Flato with Ted Flato.

Lake grew up in Texas and received his B.S. in Architecture from the University of Texas at Austin in 1976 where he was a student of Pliny Fisk III. His early work was in sustainable design, building modern versions of sod houses in the Texas panhandle. He began his career at Ford Powell & Carson in San Antonio, Texas. His work continues to be noted for attention to sustainability.

== Notable buildings ==
- Congregation Agudas Achim — Austin, Texas (2001)
- World Birding Center Headquarters — Mission, Texas (2004)
- Government Canyon Visitor Center — Helotes, Texas (2005)
- Lake Tahoe Residence — Glenbrook, Nevada (2003)

== Awards ==
- Recipient, AIA Architecture Firm Award, 2004
- Global Award for Sustainable Architecture 2013, along with his partner Ted Flato.
