= Operation Texas =

Alleged undercover operation

Operation Texas was an alleged undercover operation to relocate European Jews to Texas, USA, away from Nazi persecution, first reported in a 1989 Ph.D. dissertation by Louis Stanislaus Gomolak at the University of Texas at Austin titled Prologue: LBJ's foreign-affairs background, 1908-1948. The following are some of the key arguments of the dissertation:

- In 1938, Lyndon B. Johnson, then a Congressman and later the 36th President of the United States of America, worked covertly to establish a refuge in Texas for European Jews fleeing Nazi Germany. Johnson helped hundreds of European Jews enter Texas through Cuba, Mexico and South America.
- In part, Johnson was influenced in his attitude towards the Jews by the religious beliefs that his family, especially his grandfather (Samuel Ealy Johnson Sr.), who was a member of the Christadelphian church, shared with him. Christadelphians believe that the Jews are God's chosen people, and LBJ's grandfather once said to him, "Take care of the Jews, God’s chosen people. Consider them your friends and help them any way you can."

Various details of Gomolak's dissertation have been cited by other historians. In 2008, Larry Ben David began an online campaign to collect documentation to submit to Yad Vashem, the Holocaust Memorial Museum in Jerusalem to have LBJ awarded the title of Righteous Among the Nations, often referred to as a Righteous Gentile. The award was not awarded; Johnson does not appear on the list names in the Yad Vashem database. The number of Jews rescued is not taken into account and a criterion for recognition is that the rescuer took great risks. It is said that this criterion may be waived for diplomats.

Additional primary research on Operation Texas was done for a 1998 Houston Chronicle article and a 2016 article on the aish.com website.

More recently, many of the arguments of Gomolak's thesis have been disputed following extensive research by Claudia Wilson Anderson, an archivist at the Lyndon Baines Johnson Library and Museum. Although his research materials (e.g., written interview notes, interview recordings and primary documents not located in archives) could support his arguments, Gomolak has not made them available for external review.

== See also ==
- Slattery Report—proposal to resettle Jewish refugees in Alaska
