= Rosedale, Austin, Texas =

Neighborhood of Austin, Texas

Coordinates: 30.3127°N 97.7438°W

Neighborhood map

The Rosedale neighborhood is located in north-central Austin, Texas. The neighborhood is bordered on 38th Street to the south, Shoal Creek to the west, North Loop / Hancock Drive to the north, and Lamar Boulevard to the east.

Ramsey Park is located in the middle of the neighborhood, and has a swimming pool, tennis courts, a baseball diamond, a basketball court, playgrounds, and picnic areas. There are over 1,200 homes in the area, a variety of businesses within walking distance, and a network of medical services close by (including Seton Hospital and ATX Orthopedics).

Rosedale was first developed as farm and dairy land in the 1860s. In the 1900s, four florists and nurseries were based in the area; much of the nursery stock planted during that time remains.

Many of the homes in the Rosedale area were built during the 1930s and 1940s; since then, many have been added onto and many new homes have been built.

Chili's at 45th and Lamar, which has been the subject of internet memes since at least 2011, is at the easternmost point of Rosedale.

Rosedale is located within City Council Districts 7 and 10.
