= Northwest Hills, Austin, Texas =

Northwest Hills
- Neighborhood
- Country: United States
- State: Texas
- County: Travis
- City: Austin
- Founded: 1952
- Founder: Barrow family
- ZIP Codes: 78731 or 78759
- Area codes: 512 and 737

Northwest Hills, sometimes referred to as Far West after its main street, is a suburban neighborhood in the northwestern part of Austin, Texas, United States.

== History ==
David Barrow Sr. and Edward Barrow, along with their associate Chuck Stahl and David Barrow Jr., were responsible for much of Austin's expansion in the flatlands and in the mountain regions during most of the 1950s and 1960s. David Sr. was also primarily responsible for the eventual construction of Texas State Highway Loop 1 ("Mopac"), the highway that stretches on the east side of the neighborhood. He helped construct Mopac to help the flow of traffic for residents who lived in the northwestern quadrant of the city. Before Mopac was formed in 1966, most Northwest Hills residents had to commute to Lamar Boulevard, or sometimes as far as Interstate 35, to reach downtown, where most of them worked. He ran studies that showed that Austin needed better streets for northwestern residents.

The first properties the Barrows bought in Northwest Hills were on Balcones Drive. They then moved to the lands at Mount Bonnell, the ones that overlook the Colorado River, and began to develop properties there. Gradually, they developed lands further into the hills, expanding present-day Northwest Hills. Initially, the Barrows had no intention of expanding into Northwest Hills. They believed, however, that the affluent growth of the city was apt for northwestern Austin, and that if Austin were to ever build an area for that segment of the population, the design would take place in hilly terrains like Northwest Hills. The Barrows thus gradually began buying properties in the area by picking few parcels of land in sparse locations, developing them, and then moving to more rugged lands. Most of the lands in Northwest Hills were owned by M.E. Hart, a Canadian businessman, and a man known as Capitan Knox. The Barrows struck a deal with Hart and agreed to buy the lands from him at a rolling option, meaning that they would buy them in parts and purchase them at market price. Both of them benefited from the agreement since the Barrows did not have the capital to purchase upfront, while Hart sold the properties at an increasing market price since the values of the lands grew due to the neighborhood developments. The Barrows and their associates came to own 2,500 acres (1,000 ha) of the 3,500 acres (1,400 ha) of developed land in northwest Austin by the 1950s.

The development of the lands by the Barrows were considered unique for its time. When they put together a design for the neighborhood, they wanted to create a "new" town while drawing from other developed lands of Austin's core urban area. Balcones Drive, which borders the eastern part of Northwest Hills, was intended to serve as a counterpart to downtown's Colorado River. Far West Boulevard, which traverses Northwest Hills from east to west, was conceived to be comparable to Congress Avenue, the main street in downtown Austin. The developments by the Barrows were also considered unique because of the plan to include a Missouri Pacific Railroad system next to the neighborhood, as well as plans to have Far West Boulevard empty into Airport Boulevard, a main thoroughfare in the southeastern part of Austin.

== Geography ==
=== Urban geography ===
Northwest Hills is located on the northwestern side of Austin. The neighborhood is sometimes referred to as Far West after its main street, Far West Boulevard, which stretches from Mopac on the east and goes deep into the residential homes on the west prior to reaching the Ladera Norte street, close to Capital of Texas Highway. The commercial area between Mopac and Mesa Drive, which intersects with Far West Boulevard, is the biggest commercial area of the neighborhood. The boulevard hosts several local and national businesses, stores, restaurants, apartments, and business offices. The streets adjacent to Far West Boulevard are the most densely populated areas of Northwest Hills.

== Architecture and societal structure ==
Most of the houses in Northwest Hills area feature Colonial, Californian ranch, or Texas Tuscan villa-style architectures. Beyond Mesa Drive, many of the homes have a western Austin style: big family homes with large garages, landscaped yards, and old trees. The common design is brick and limestone. The community is mostly middle and upper-middle class, and is often cited as being "upscale".

Residents are usually quite involved with the community, and they have worked together with the City of Austin on zoning issues to ensure that the neighborhood continues to enjoy high-quality living standards. Despite being mostly family-residential, the area is also quite popular with college students due to the area's condominiums, townhouses, and apartment complexes. Most of the students live in the lower part of the neighborhood, in streets like Greystone and Wood Hollow, which connect with Far West Boulevard.

== Culture ==
Jimmy Buffett wrote "Margaritaville" on Shadow Valley Drive in Northwest Hills. https://kxrb.com/story-behind-the-song-margaritaville-by-jimmy-buffett/ (source) Christian churches in Northwest Hills include Northwest Hills United Methodist Church, and St. Theresa of Lisieux Catholic Church.

Every year since 1972, the Northwest Austin Civic Association (NWACA), which includes residents from Northwest Hills, hosts a Fourth of July parade. The parade, in which over 2,000 Austinites participate on average each year, features a band, dance teams, antique vehicles, miniature pets, fire trucks, and a so-called Ladies Lawn Chair Brigade, where female residents march the street dressed in red, white, and blue and carrying aluminum chairs.

== Education ==
Northwest Hills is located in the Austin Independent School District. Schools located in Northwest Hills include:

- Doss Elementary School
- Hill Elementary School
- Murchison Middle School.
- Anderson High School
- St. Theresa Catholic School. It is next to the church under the same name.

== Infrastructure ==
=== Bus transportation ===
Northwest Hills area has several bus lines through the Capital Metropolitan Transportation Authority ("Capital Metro"), Austin's public transportation provider.

=== Highways ===
Far West Boulevard is connected to Mopac, which stretches from north to south Austin and serves as a viable alternative for Interstate 35. Mopac has an 11-mile toll road, the Mopac Express Lane that runs both northbound and southbound, from Cesar Chavez Street (south) to Parmer Lane (north).

== See also ==
- List of Austin neighborhoods

== Bibliography ==
- Busch, Andrew M. (2017). City in a Garden: Environmental Transformations and Racial Justice in Twentieth-Century Austin, Texas. UNC Press Books. ISBN 1469632659.
- Chang, Yushan (2006). Newcomer's Handbook Neighborhood Guide: Dallas-Fort Worth, Houston, and Austin. First Books. ISBN 0912301708.
- Orum, Anthony M. (2002). Power, Money and the People: The Making of Modern Austin. Wipf and Stock Publishers. ISBN 1592440770.
- Rossie, Casie; Hylton, Hilary (2001). Insiders' Guide to Austin. Rowman & Littlefield. ISBN 0762755687.
