= McCallum High School =

Coordinates: 30°19′33″N 97°43′49″W

A.N. McCallum High School

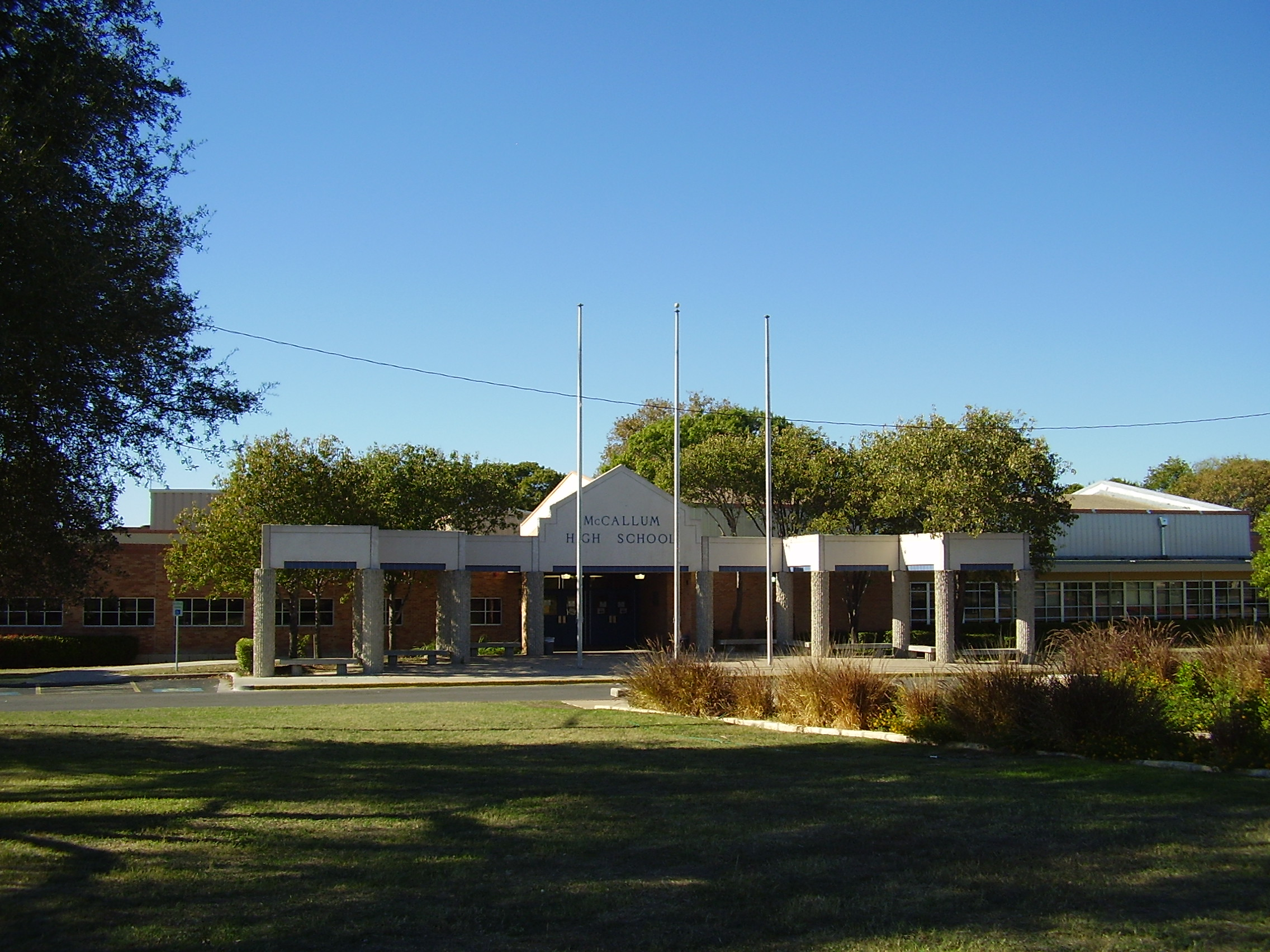

Location
- 5600 Sunshine Drive; Austin, Texas; 78756; United States

Information
- Opened: 1953
- School district: Austin Independent School District
- Principal: Andy Baxa
- Grades: 9-12
- Enrollment: 1,890 (2025-2026)
- Colors: Royal blue and grey
- Athletics conference: UIL Class 5A
- Mascot: Knight
- Nickname: MAC
- Team name: The Knights, Lady Knights
- Rival: Anderson HS
- Publication: Excalibur (literary magazine)
- Newspaper: The Shield
- Yearbook: The Knight
- Website: mccallum.austinschools.org

A. N. McCallum High School is a public high school in Austin, Texas, United States.

McCallum, the second oldest high school in the Austin Independent School District (formerly known as Austin Public Schools prior to desegregation in 1971), opened in 1953 to relieve growth in north and northwest Austin. It is named after AISD's first high school superintendent, A.N. McCallum.

In 1994, McCallum motioned to make its campus the home of AISD's Fine Arts Academy. Currently, the Fine Arts Academy is open to all students in AISD who wish to attend, given that they are accepted following an admissions process. Current fine arts strands include visual arts, dance, theatre (acting/performance and technical), cinematic arts, voice, and instrumental music (band, orchestra, classical guitar, and collaborative piano). The Fine Arts Academy was recently named the 2015 Grammy Foundation's National Signature School, the lone recipient out of thousands of fine arts high schools in the country. McCallum had previously ranked as a Signature School Finalist in 2005, a decade before winning the highest award possible.

Topping the list of thirteen high schools in the country, McCallum's recognition as the National Signature School earned the music program $5,000 from the Grammy Foundation and the Grammy In The Schools program. As recipient of the Foundation's Gold Award, McCallum High School earned the title of best music program in a public U.S. high school through making outstanding commitments to arts education throughout an academic school year. Student ensembles benefitting directly from this award included concert band, choral ensemble, orchestra, classical guitar ensemble, jazz band, and steel pan ensemble.

== History ==
Plans for a new high school campus in North Austin began as early as 1947, and were formalized at the Austin School Board meeting on May 9, 1949. At that time, the only (white) high school campus in town was Stephen F. Austin High School, which, prior to expansion, was simply known as "Austin High". With Austin High's population approaching 3000 students, the board perceived the need to expand in order to support the city's post-war population boom. McCallum High School was designed by the architecture firm Page Southerland Page, which was founded by Charles Henry Page, and which also designed several other historic structures in the Austin area. Construction began in March 1951 at a total cost of $1.4M, or $11.88 per square foot, and the school's first classes were held on September 8, 1953. At its opening, initial enrollment was 1,336 students, of which 683 were in grades 9-12, and there were 62 total teaching, administrative and clerical staff.

In 1956 the first African-American student began attending McCallum as part of desegregation; a total of 13 black students attended white high schools in AISD at that time. In 1994, the Fine Arts Academy enrolled 17 students, and now has over 500 students. The Academy gained visibility as its own entity within the high school with a professionally designed logo, creation and maintenance of the Academy website, and increased social media coverage.

In 2004, McCallum High School band performed at a ceremony in which Mayor Will Wynn proclaimed October 25 Mangiasaurus Day.

In 2009, portions of the film Bandslam featuring Vanessa Hudgens and Lisa Kudrow were filmed on the McCallum campus.

In 2011, the high school campus welcomed a new building to the campus, the "MAC" or McCallum Arts Center. This facility houses three new art classrooms and a 500-seat theatre and technical theater shop space. This was the venue used for the 20th anniversary of the Fine Arts Academy in 2014.

On May 7, 2015, nine-time Grammy award-winner Ray Benson of Asleep at the Wheel performed at the evening reception for students, families, school administrators, and local press.

In April 2023, local news station KXAN-TV reported on an incident at McCallum in which a raccoon fell from the ceiling into a classroom. The story was subsequently picked up and run nationally by the New York Post, Fox News and HuffPost, and the raccoon became a popular meme among students.

In May 2023, The Hershey Company began airing a television commercial that was filmed on the McCallum campus and that features McCallum students and staff.

== Feeder patterns ==
McCallum has the following feeder pattern:

- Kealing Middle School
  - Campbell Elementary
  - Lee Elementary
  - Maplewood Elementary
- Lamar Middle School
  - Brentwood Elementary
  - Gullett Elementary
  - Highland Park Elementary
  - Reilly Elementary
- Webb Middle School
  - Reilly Elementary

== Academics ==
McCallum participates in the College Board Advanced Placement (AP) program and offers approximately 25 AP courses in addition to various dual enrollment opportunities. It is ranked among the top 5% of public high schools nationally by Niche and among the top 10% nationally by U.S. News & World Report. McCallum was one of only five Austin Independent School District high school campuses to receive the highest overall rating of "A" from the Texas Education Agency using its revised assessment criteria, with distinction designations in the following areas:

- Academic Achievement in Reading / Language Arts
- Academic Achievement in Science
- Academic Achievement in Social Studies
- Top 25 Percent: Comparative Academic Growth
- Postsecondary Readiness

The McCallum student newspaper (The Shield) was one of six such publications statewide to win "Gold" at the 2025 ILPC ("Interscholastic League Press Conference"), and McCallum was one of four high schools to earn a "Gold" designation for its online news offerings. Seventeen McCallum students were named to the 2025 ILPC All-State journalism staff, the most from any Texas high school and 7% of the statewide total. A McCallum student was named 2024 National Journalist of the Year by the Journalism Education Association. McCallum also won the Staff Excellence Blue and Gold Award for scoring the most points across all categories at Quill and Scroll's 2025 International Writing, Photo and Multimedia Contest.

== Performing arts ==
From the 2008–2009 school year to the 2025–2026 school year, McCallum produced no fewer than six Texas Music Educators Association All-State ensemble qualifiers each year, with 149 total qualifiers over those eighteen school years: the most of any Austin ISD campus.

The McCallum marching band has reached the Texas UIL State Marching Band Competition a total of eight times (2026, 2025, 2021, 2019, 2017, 2005, 1980, 1979), qualifying for the final round in four of those years (2025, 2021, 1980, 1979).

== Athletics ==
State championship appearances:

- Baseball
  - 1956 (2A), 1997 (4A)
- Boys' basketball
  - 1966 (4A), 1992 (4A)
- Boys' golf
  - 1980 (4A)
- Volleyball
  - 1994 (4A), 1997 (4A)

== Notable alumni ==
- Jay Arnette, basketball player (1963–1966)
- Robbie Beckett, Major League Baseball player
- Matt Belisle, Major League Baseball player (1998)
- George Birge, musical artist
- Andy Brown, attorney and politician (1990)
- Steve Chapman, journalist and columnist (1972)
- Tom Kite, professional golfer
- Kaitlin Knifton, U.S. Olympic rower
- Timothy Kopra, engineer, colonel, and astronaut (1981)
- Aline Mayagoitia, actor
- Mother Falcon, indie rock band
- Austin Nichols, actor and director
- Wiley Wiggins, game designer and film actor
- Edwin Osbourne Wilson, co-founder of the Armadillo World Headquarters
- Bill Zapalac, football player (1971–1973)
