= Wooten, Austin, Texas =

Neighborhood of Austin, Texas

Wooten
- Neighborhood
- Coordinates: 30°21′36″N 97°43′23″W
- Country: United States
- State: Texas
- City: Austin

Area
  - Total: 0.958 sq mi (2.48 km^{2})
- Time zone: UTC-6 (CST)
  - Summer (DST): UTC-5 (CDT)
- ZIP Codes: 78757
- Area codes: 512, 737

The Wooten neighborhood of Austin, Texas is located in north central Austin. It is bounded by Burnet Road, Anderson Lane, and Research Blvd (183) and bisected by Ohlen Road.

Wooten is located entirely within City Council District 4.

== Demographics ==
American Community Survey data from the United States Census Bureau estimates the population of Wooten at 7,163 residents within the five-year period of 2017 through 2021. Of these residents, 42.9% of survey respondents identified as white, 5% identified as Black or African American, 3% identified as Asian, 30.5% identified as "some other race", and 18.5% identified as two or more races. 60.3% of Wooten residents reported Hispanic or Latino heritage. The median annual household income in Wooten during this period was $60,603, compared to a median income of $79,542 in the city of Austin.

== Recreation ==
Wooten Neighborhood Park is located in Wooten.

== Education ==
=== Public schools ===
Wooten is served by the Austin Independent School District. The neighborhood is zoned for Wooten Elementary School, Burnet Middle School, and Juan Navarro High School.

=== Private schools ===
Redeemer Lutheran School consists of an Early Childhood Center for children between the ages of 15 months and 4 years old, Redeemer Elementary School for students in KinderBridge through the 5th grade, and Redeemer Middle School for students in grades 6 through 8.
