= Orange Line (CapMetro) =

Planned light rail line in Austin, Texas

Overview
- Status: In planning
- Locale: Austin, Texas
- Termini: North Lamar Transit Center (future extension to Tech Ridge); Stassney (future extension to Slaughter)
- Stations: 15

Service
- Type: Light rail
- System: CapMetro Rail
- Operator(s): Capital Metropolitan Transportation Authority

History
- Planned opening: 2029

Technical
- Line length: 20 mi (32 km)

The Orange Line is a proposed north-south light rail line that will serve the central spine of Austin, Texas, United States, from North Lamar to Stassney Lane. It is in the planning stages as a part of CapMetro's Project Connect. It is estimated to begin revenue service as early as 2029.

== History ==
A contract for preliminary engineering work along the line was approved on March 20, 2019. In 2020, the planned route was truncated in length to reduce construction costs, with bus bridges providing connectivity through the rest of the corridor. Potential future phases may extend the line north to Tech Ridge and south to Slaughter as initially envisioned — those alignments are expected to be included in National Environmental Policy Act processing to allow for conversion to light rail in the future.

== Route ==
The Orange Line is 20 miles (32 km) long and will run in its own dedicated transitway, including the Downtown Transit Tunnel, which will allow it to bypass the traffic that plagues the corridor it follows. The Orange Line will operate from North Lamar Transit Center to Stassney & Congress, and will follow the current route of the CapMetro Rapid 801 or a similar alignment. It is planned to run along The Drag.

Future extensions to the line would feature stations at Tech Ridge, Parmer, Braker, Rundberg, William Cannon, and Slaughter.

=== Stations ===
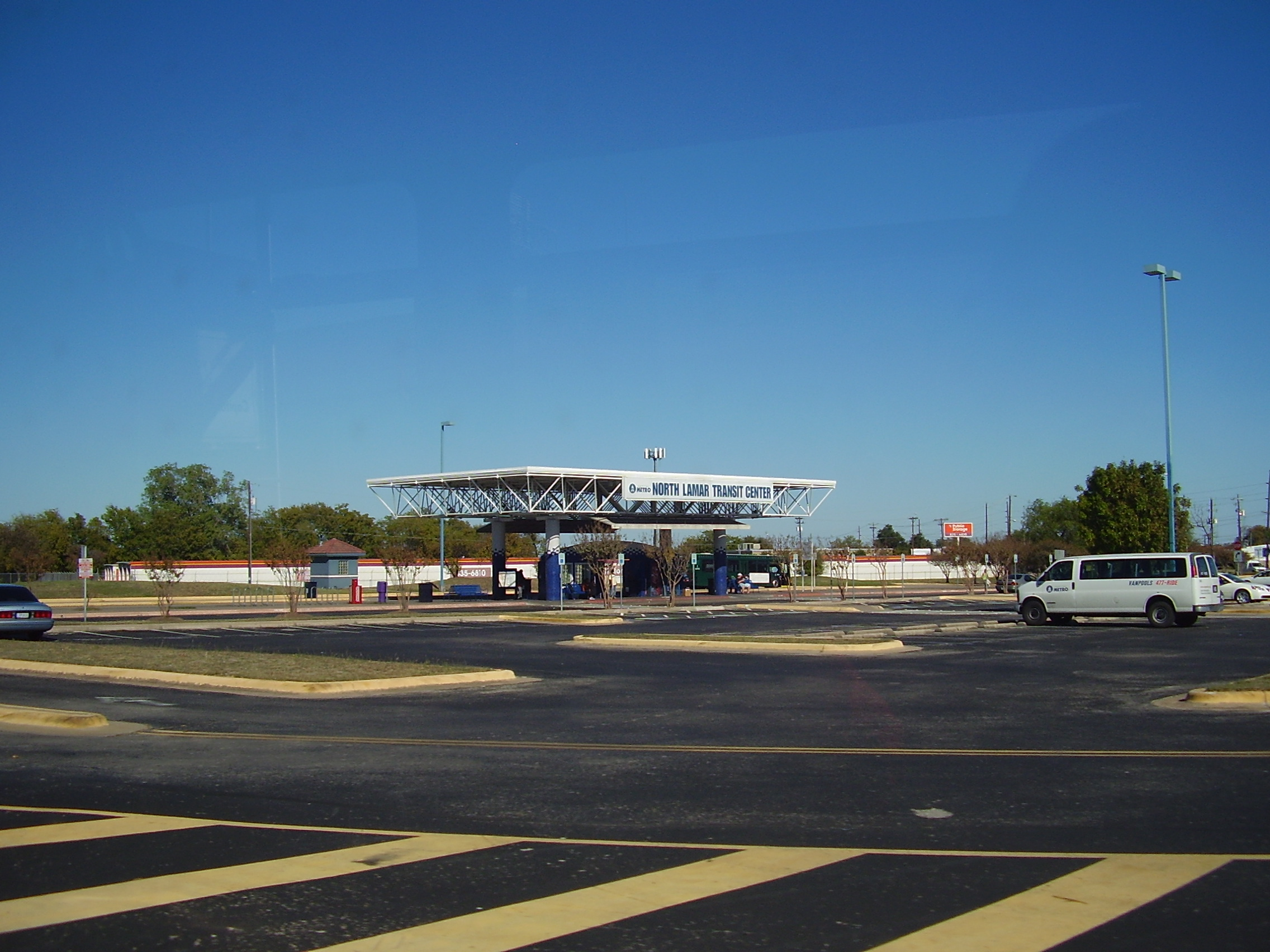
North Lamar Transit Center, the planned northern terminus of the line, seen in 2008

Stations are listed north to south.

Station name	Parking	Rail connections	Bus connections	Nearby points of interest
North Lamar Transit Center	Yes	Blue Line	CapMetro Rapid 801; CapMetro Bus 1, 323, 350, 383	Anderson Square Shopping Center
Crestview	No	Red Line Blue Line	CapMetro Rapid 801; CapMetro Bus 1, 7, 300, 324, 350	Crestview station, Midtown Commons, Texas DPS Credit Union, Black Star Co-op
Koenig		Blue Line	CapMetro Rapid 801; CapMetro Bus 1, 337	Texas Department of Public Safety, Texas Highway Patrol, McCallum High School
Triangle	Yes	Blue Line	CapMetro Rapid 801; CapMetro Bus 1, 345, 656, 990	Hyde Park, The Triangle, Texas Facilities Commission, UT Intramural Fields, UT Microfarm, The Triangle Park
Hyde Park		Blue Line	CapMetro Rapid 801, 803; CapMetro Bus 1, 3, 19, 335	Hyde Park, Austin State Hospital, Central Market, Heart Hospital of Austin
Hemphill Park		Blue Line	CapMetro Bus 1, 3, 19, 642	University of Texas at Austin, Phi Gamma Delta, Scottish Rite Dormitory
UT/West Mall		Blue Line	CapMetro Rapid 801, 803; CapMetro Bus 1, 3, 19, 20, 105, 640, 982, 990	University of Texas at Austin, Peter T. Flawn Academic Center, Goldsmith Hall, Sutton Hall, Battle Hall, Parlin Hall, Rainey Hall, Harry Ransom Center
Government Center / Capitol West		Blue Line	CapMetro Rapid 801, 803; CapMetro Bus 1, 3, 19, 20, 105, 985	Wooldridge Square Park, Austin Public Library, Travis County Civil Courthouse, Texas State Capitol, Travis County Adult Probation, Texas Alliance of Child and Family Services
Republic Square		Blue Line	CapMetro Rapid 801, 803, Gold Line; CapMetro Bus 105, 111, 171, 980, 981, 985	City Hall, Republic Square, Sixth Street, Texas State Board of Nursing, United States Federal Court
Auditorium Shores			CapMetro Rapid 801, Gold Line; CapMetro Bus 1, 7, 20, 142, 935	Auditorium Shores, Lady Bird Lake, Long Center for the Performing Arts
SoCo			CapMetro Rapid 801, Gold Line; CapMetro Bus 1	South Congress, Texas School for the Deaf
Oltorf			CapMetro Rapid 801, Gold Line; CapMetro Bus 1, 300	South Congress H-E-B, St. Ignatius Martyr School, William B. Travis High School
St. Edward's			CapMetro Rapid 801, Gold Line; CapMetro Bus 1	Saint Edward's University
South Congress Transit Center	Yes		CapMetro Rapid 801, Gold Line; CapMetro Bus 1, 310, 315	St David's South Hospital, St. Elmo District
Stassney			CapMetro Rapid 801, Gold Line; CapMetro Bus 1, 311	Williamson Creek Greenbelt
