= Project Connect =

Ballot measure in Austin, Texas expanding the public transit system

Proposition A
- November 3, 2020
- Public transportation expansion referendum

Results
Choice	Votes	%
Yes	230,376	58.25%
No	165,138	41.75%
Valid votes	395,514	100.76%
Invalid or blank votes	−2,967	−0.76%
Total votes	392,547	100.00%
- Travis County Official Results

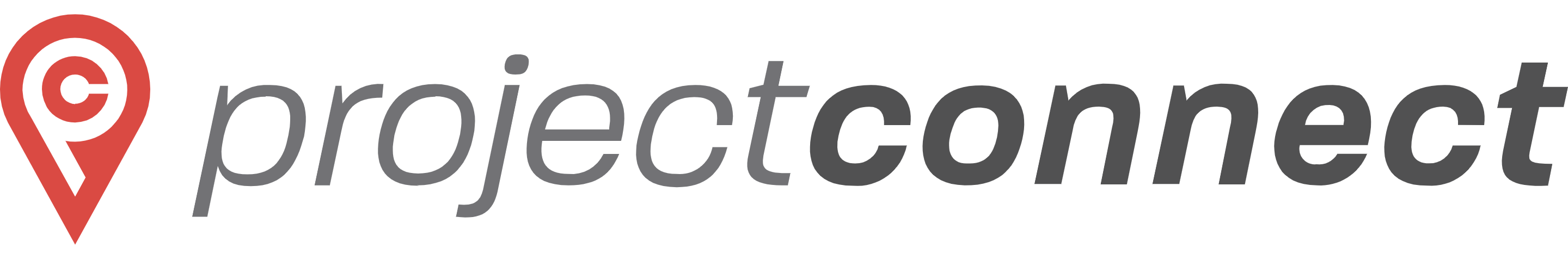
Project Connects Logo

Project Connect (listed as Proposition A on the general election ballot) is a transit expansion program in Austin, Texas led by the Austin Transit Partnership and the Capital Metropolitan Transportation Authority (CapMetro). The program was approved by voters on November 3, 2020, in a local election concurrent with the 2020 presidential election.

The project is estimated to cost $7.1 billion and will be funded with public funds, both federally and locally through increasing the local property tax rate by 8.75 cents. This is a smaller-scale version of the proposal, originally estimated at $10 billion, but ultimately downsized to $7.1 billion due to COVID-induced cost concerns. Plans were again scaled down in 2023 as construction costs had risen since the proposition's passage.

== Original Proposal ==
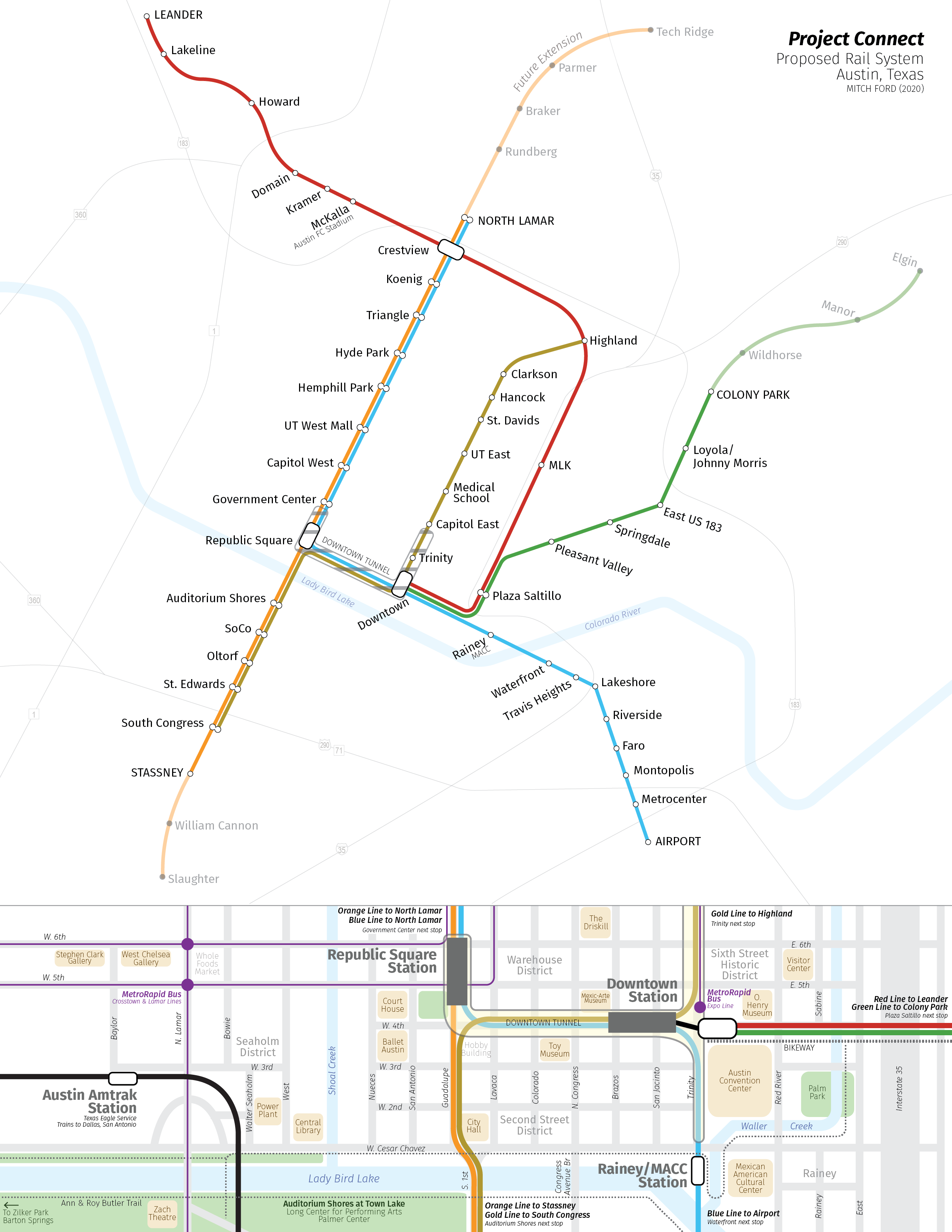
A schematic map depicting the proposed rail lines of Project Connect.

As a part of the plan, CapMetro would add two light rail lines, three bus rapid transit lines, and one commuter rail line to the already existing Red Line, which will also undergo major improvements. The proposal also calls for general investments to all routes, a fully-electric bus and train fleet, and new park and ride areas throughout the service area. A Downtown Transit Tunnel was originally proposed, but was cut from plans in May 2023.

=== CapMetro Rail Blue Line ===
Phase I of the Blue Line would operate on a 7.8-mile (12.6 km) stretch of light rail with 13 stations, running through downtown to 38th Street from Yellow Jacket Lane. The line would provide service along East Riverside Drive, then join with the Orange Line to cross Lady Bird Lake to the Austin Convention Center and run west on 3rd Street to Republic Square (the city's central transportation hub). Phase I of the line continues north with the Orange Line along Guadalupe Street to terminate 38th Street. The Blue Line will provide key service to the Texas State Capitol complex and The University of Texas at Austin campus. Phase I Priority Extensions include a 3.2-mile (5.1 km), primarily elevated southeastern extension to serve the Austin-Bergstrom International Airport, and a 2.7-mile (4.3 km) northern extension shared with the Orange Line along Guadalupe Street and North Lamar Boulevard to Crestview station. The blue line will run at a frequency of every 10 minutes, but that frequency can be increased for special events if needed. On parts of the route where two light rail lines share the same tracks, trains will arrive every 5 minutes.

=== CapMetro Rail Orange Line ===
Phase I of the Orange Line, planned to be approximately 5.2 miles (8.4 km) with 9 stations, will link North and South Austin. The line would run from Oltorf Street to Lady Bird Lake along South Congress Avenue, before joining with the Blue Line and connecting to Downtown and the UT Campus, terminating jointly at 38th Street. The route would share a Phase I Priority Extension north to Crestview Station with the Blue Line, running a similar route to the current MetroRapid Route 801. The Orange Line will run at a frequency of every 10 minutes, but that frequency can be increased for special events if needed. On parts of the route where two light rail lines share the same tracks, trains will arrive every 5 minutes.

=== CapMetro Rail Green Line ===
The MetroRail Green Line is a proposed 27-mile (43 km) corridor traveling from downtown Austin to eastern Travis County and into Bastrop County, connecting Manor, Texas with downtown Austin by commuter rail. With new transit hubs and Park & Rides, the Green Line would operate along Capital Metro's existing freight line between Austin and Manor, with a possible future terminus at Elgin, connecting suburban residents to central Austin. The Green Line would interline with the Red Line between Downtown and Plaza Saltillo stations, where it will then split off, with the Red Line heading north and the Green Line heading east.

=== CapMetro Rail Red Line infill and improvement ===
CapMetro's Red Line is a commuter rail service linking downtown Austin to residential neighborhoods in East Austin, the Domain, Research Park, Cedar Park, and Leander. Currently under construction is the future Downtown station, which will connect commuters with the downtown area, giving commuters and visitors direct access to the Austin Convention Center. Multiple upgrades to the red line are proposed by Project Connect. Two new stations were planned, at McKalla (adjacent to the new Austin FC soccer stadium), and at the Broadmoor development. These new stations would replace the existing Kramer station. The installation of positive train control was completed in August 2020. Additionally, once the new Downtown station is complete, the red line will run every 15 minutes, doubling its current frequency and capacity. If Project Connect is built out to its full plan in the future, the red line will be electrified, and station platforms will be extended to accommodate 2-unit trains.

=== CapMetro Rapid Gold Line ===
The revised proposal would build the Gold Line first as a MetroRapid bus service. The system plan, however, envisions the Gold Line as light rail that would operate for approximately 9.5 miles (15.3 km) connecting 15 stations from Austin Community College's Highland campus along Airport Boulevard and Red River Street into downtown, across the river and through SoCo (South Congress), a popular neighborhood south of the Colorado River. Along its route, the Gold Line would service UT Austin's main campus to the east, easing access to sports events, given the line's close proximity to Darrell K Royal-Texas Memorial Stadium and new Moody Center.

=== Downtown Transit Tunnel ===
The original plans for Project Connect proposed a 1.6-mile (2.6 km) transit tunnel underneath the Downtown area, which would have served the Orange, Blue, and Gold light rail lines. The initial tunnel would have run under Guadalupe street from Cesar Chavez street to at least 14th street, as well as under 4th street from Guadalupe to Trinity street with another tunnel being dug at a later point under Trinity street from Cesar Chavez street to 14th street to serve the gold line.

By 2021, planners were considering moving the Orange Line's southern portal to near Lively Middle School at Leland Street, citing engineering challenges with emerging close to Lady Bird Lake and the topography of South Congress. By 2022, due to cost overruns and ballooning labor and material costs due to the COVID-19 pandemic, Project Connect would be drastically downsized, with the Downtown Transit Tunnel being one of the first aspects to be cut with the lines being rerouted to all share a bridge.

=== CapMetro Rapid and CapMetro Express expansion ===
Currently, CapMetro operates two bus rapid transit routes (801 and 803) branded as CapMetro Rapid. Under Project Connect, seven new lines are proposed as enhanced or potential future service throughout Austin. In addition to connecting different transit services, these lines mostly feature a park and ride at their terminus for commuters. Project Connect also proposes four new MetroExpress commuter bus lines, as well as extended service to existing lines.

MetroBus
Name	Type	Termini	Notes
Burnet to Menchaca & Oak Hill	MetroRapid Enhanced Route	Broadmoor/Domain to Oak Hill/Tanglewood	Similar to MetroRapid Route 803 with extensions to Oak Hill and Tanglewood in South Austin
Expo	MetroRapid Enhanced Route	Downtown to Expo Center	Runs north from Downtown station alongside the Gold Line before heading northeast on Manor Road
Pleasant Valley	MetroRapid Enhanced Route	Berkman/Mueller to Goodnight	Runs mostly north to south along Pleasant Valley Road in East Austin
MLK	CapMetro Rapid Potential Future Extension	Red Bud to Decker	Runs east-west along Enfield Road and Martin Luther King Jr. Blvd
Crosstown	CapMetro Rapid Potential Future Extension	Red Bud to Eastside Bus Plaza	Runs east-west downtown with connecting service to CARTS
ACC Highland to Tech Ridge	CapMetro Rapid Potential Future Extension	Highland to Tech Ridge	Runs north-south along Cameron Road
Parmer	CapMetro Rapid Potential Future Extension	Lakeline to Wildhorse	Runs east-west from Cedar Park to Manor along Parmer Lane
RM 2222	MetroExpress	Four Points to Republic Square	
North IH-35	CapMetro Express	Georgetown to Republic Square	
MoPac (South)	CapMetro Express	Wildflower to Republic Square	
SH 45 Toll	CapMetro Express	Hutto to Republic Square	
SH 71	CapMetro Express	Bastrop to Eastside Bus Plaza	
South US-183	CapMetro Express	Lockhart to Eastside Bus Plaza	
South IH-35	CapMetro Express	San Marcos to Downtown	

=== Electric fleet ===
As part of the Project Connect plan, CapMetro envisions a fully-electric bus and train fleet. The goal is to completely electrify the fleet of around 400 buses and trains by 2040, and the agency has already purchased 12 electric buses. In 2018, 3 bus manufacturers, Proterra, New Flyer, and BYD, lent electric test buses to Capital Metro for a pilot testing program. The agency ultimately chose Proterra for the purchase of their first 2 electric buses, later increasing that number to 6 buses. The first 2 Proterra buses arrived in late 2019, and the next 4 arrived in the summer of 2020. In 2019, Capital Metro approved a contract with New Flyer for the purchase of 6 Xcelsior electric buses. The order includes four 40-foot and two 60-foot buses, and these buses were delivered in the summer of 2020. The agency chose New Flyer for the second order of buses because they offered the 60-foot option, which Proterra does not offer. CapMetro also chose to buy from two different manufacturers to help compare the performance of each company's buses and inform decisions on larger contracts in the future.

CapMetro broke ground in 2019 on a new electric bus charging facility at their North Operations yard on Burnet Road. The facility will have the capacity to charge and maintain 200 electric buses, and will be highly automated.

The Orange, Blue, and Gold light rail lines will run on electricity, unlike the current Red Line, which uses diesel-electric trains. CapMetro is looking into various options for powering the light rail vehicles, such as a traditional catenary system, using battery-powered trains with quick-charging technology at stations (such as Kinkisharyo's e-Brid technology), and Alstom's APS Ground-Level Power Supply system. The existing red line will also be electrified.

=== Neighborhood circulators ===
Neighborhood circulator buses will connect transit areas to the surrounding community. According to the proposal, there will be 15 new neighborhood zones for this first/last mile connection service.

=== CapMetro Bike ===
For last mile connections, CapMetro proposes an electric bike fleet at transit hubs as well as rental/payment integration in the CapMetro mobile application.

=== Park and Rides ===
In addition to new services, CapMetro is also proposing nine new park and rides throughout the region.

New Park and Rides
Name	Connections	Location	Nearby points of interest and notes
Four Points	CapMetro Express, Circulator	RM 620/RM 2222	Four Points Shopping Center
Loop 360	CapMetro Express, Circulator	Loop 360/RM 2222	Indeed headquarters and other corporate offices
Highland	Red Line, Gold Line	Airport Blvd/Koenig Ln	Austin Community College, Highland Mall
183/290	CapMetro Express	U.S. 183/U.S. 290	Walnut Creek Business Park
Expo Center	Expo CapMetro Rapid Line	Decker Ln/Loyola Ln	Travis County Exposition Center, Walter E. Long Park
Metro Center	Blue Line	E. Riverside Drive/Ben White Boulevard	Airport Hotel District
McKinney Falls	Pleasant Valley CapMetro Rapid Line	McKinney Falls Pkwy/William Cannon Dr	McKinney Falls State Park
Goodnight	Pleasant Valley CapMetro Rapid Line	E. Slaughter Ln/Vertex Blvd	Goodnight Ranch planned community
Wildflower	CapMetro Express	Mopac Expressway/La Crosse Blvd	Lady Bird Johnson Wildflower Center, Circle C Ranch

== Current Plans ==
=== Scaled Back Light Rail ===
By April 2022, the estimated cost of the light rail portion of Project Connect had ballooned to $10.3 billion, up from the initial $5.8 billion estimate. Austin Transit Partnership presented five reduced plans in March 2023 in order to deliver the light rail lines with the provided funding. Most of the proposed alternatives did away with tunneling downtown, with a greater reliance on surface running tracks. Austin Transit Partnership selected a preferred route in May 2023 with surface running and one crossing of Lady Bird Lake. Austin City Council gave its approval to a $7.1 billion preliminary project, which would include 9.8 miles of new light rail line, on June 1, 2023.

After it was announced that the light rail portion of the project was would back in 2023, ATP presented the community with 5 alternatives for the first phase of the project. Ultimately, a 9.8 mile system running from 38th street down Guadalupe Street before turning East on 3rd street. At Trinity street, the line would turn south to continue over a new dedicated rail and pedestrian bridge over Lady Bird Lake. Just south of the river, the proposed line would include a station before splitting into two branches. One branch would cross East Riverside before turning to run along South Congress Avenue, terminating just south of Oltorf Street. The other branch would turn to follow East Riverside Drive until terminating at Yellow Jacket Lane.

The chosen alternative also includes two priority extensions. One would travel north from 38th street, continuing along Guadalupe until joining up with Lamar Boulevard to terminate at Crestview Station. The other would extend the Eastern branch to the airport. An operations and maintenance facility for the storage of light rail vehicles and maintenance equipment would be located in a current industrial park on Airport Commerce Drive.

=== Budget ===
On September 24, 2024, it was announced that Project Connect would tentatively be going forward with a $193 million budget for the fiscal year and that it would hopefully break ground in 2027. The project also includes two bus lanes that began operating in 2025. The exact budget was $172 million in funding from taxpayers, with the remaining $21 million in investments and other income. The Austin Transit Partnership has estimated it will spend $116 million towards "professional services and administrative costs" with the rest going towards new construction. Of that, $8 million is set aside for the two bus routes, while the remaining cost will go towards environmental impact reviews, as well as overall design.

By July 2026, KUT reported that the estimated cost of the light rail line exceeded $8.2 billion, with construction set to begin in 2027 and the first trains on target to run in 2033. Community Impact's reporting in February and April 2026 continued to describe the project as a $7.1 billion, 10-mile system.

=== Environmental Review ===
As part of ATP's efforts to receive a New Starts Grant through the federal Department of Transportation's Capital Investment Grants Program, the agency was required to cooperate with the Federal Transit Administration (FTA) in order to complete a National Environmental Policy Act (NEPA) environmental review process. The NEPA process required ATP to complete an Environmental Impact Statement which included a robust public engagement period, as well as a comprehensive review of the project's projected effect on the environment, congestion, and housing. The Draft Environmental Impact Statement (DEIS) was released in January 2025 and presented the public with six design options to be included in the preferred alternative. The options included a station at Wooldridge Square, an off street station at Cesar Chavez, an elevated segment south of Lady Bird Lake along East Riverside, the removal of a station at Travis Heights, an active mobility corridor in the median East Riverside Drive, and the combination of Faro and Montopolis stations into a single station at Grove.

After a 60 day public comment period on the DEIS, ATP worked in coordination with the FTA to respond to all substantive comments and to decide which design options to include in the preferred alternative. The process, which took slightly over a year from the release of the DEIS, culminated in the completion of the NEPA review process. On January 16, 2026, the FTA released a Record of Decision (ROD) stating that the project had met all NEPA and federal environmental requirements. Released concurrently with the Final Environmental Impact Statement (FEIS), the ROD allowed ATP to begin the acquisition of property through eminent domain and the relocation of utilities. Additionally, ATP could now start the process of awarding contracts for the design and construction of infrastructure along the light rail right-of-way (ROW), the design and construction of the operations and maintenance facility (OMF), and the procurement of light rail vehicles (LRVs) for the system. According to the ROD, all of this must be done consistently with the FEIS, or else further approvals would be required.

Of the six design options in the DEIS, the preferred alternative in the FEIS included five. The option for an off street station at Cesar Chavez was shelved because an agreement with a private developer could not be reached. However, the FEIS left open the possibility the option's inclusion in the final design if a deal with a developer were to materialize at some point in the future. In response to public feedback, the Grove Station option was slightly altered so as to retain the station at Montopolis, while moving the Station at Faro to Grove in order to facilitate more convenient bus transfers to the Austin Community College: Riverside Campus.

=== 2026 developments ===
On February 18, 2026, the ATP board approved a $60 million design-build contract for the first phase of preconstruction with Austin Rail Constructors (ARC), a joint venture between Stacy Witbeck and Sundt Construction, and authorized $1 million for relocation agreements with private utility companies. ARC is to build what ATP described as "nearly every aspect" of the system, including the transitway, tracks, systems, stations, bridges, traffic signals, utilities, drainage structures and streetscape improvements. ATP chief executive Greg Canally said construction remained on track to begin in 2027 and that preconstruction testing and utility work would put "boots on the ground" during 2026.

At its April 15, 2026 meeting, the board approved a contract of up to $25 million with Kiewit Austin Partnership, a joint venture between Kiewit Building Group and Austin Commercial, to build an operations and maintenance facility for the light rail fleet, and a resolution of up to $230 million to acquire as many as 18 parcels of land, half of them for the maintenance facility and half along the rail alignment. Mayor Kirk Watson said the acquisitions were "the beginning of the process where people may anticipate that we will be taking condemnation actions and eminent domain actions", and ATP executive director Greg Canally said the negotiations would take 12 to 18 months. The board postponed votes on a proposed 90-month lease of 51,600 square feet (4,790 m^{2}) of administrative office space for $32 million and $15 million of related building improvements, after Watson recommended that ATP instead co-locate with CapMetro.

In May 2026, the Austin City Council approved an updated transit system projects ordinance and a new interlocal agreement with ATP, intended to coordinate the light rail design with city capital projects along the alignment and to reduce construction disruption. On June 7, 2026, CapMetro opened the Goodnight Ranch and Expo Center park-and-ride facilities and began full service on the Rapid 800 and Rapid 837 bus routes; both routes, first introduced in February 2025, now operate at 10-minute frequencies during peak hours.

Much of Project Connect's original timeline has been superseded by CapMetro's Transit Plan 2035, a long-range plan approved by the agency's board in 2025 that sets out where bus, commuter rail and on-demand service are expected to go over the following decade. As of July 2026, the plan included no start date for the Gold Line Rapid bus route or the Green Line commuter rail line beyond describing both as more than ten years away.

== Legal controversy ==
In November 2023, the City of Austin and the Austin Transit Partnership, among others, were sued under the legal theory that the scaled down plans required voter approval. The plaintiffs include former state senator Gonzalo Barrientos (D-14), Travis County Commissioner Margaret Gómez (D), and Austin Council Member Ora Houston (D), with the lead plaintiff being a burger restaurant built in 1926 named Dirty Martin's that was set to be demolished in the original project proposition. They argue that although the scope of the project was reduced in size and cost in 2022, that the reduced scope warrants an entire new proposition, and cannot proceed or be funded without a popular referendum. More specifically, the plaintiffs argue that the city cannot use money that was earmarked for maintenance and operation to be used for debt service on bonds the ATP planned on issuing.

Texas' attorney general, Ken Paxton (R) issued an opinion in favor of the plaintiffs, arguing that the ATP's bond funding scheme violates article XI, section 5 of the Texas Constitution. The plaintiffs are requesting that the Travis County district court permanently enjoin the city defendants from “continuing to assess or collect the Project Connect tax because they no longer have voter approval for the tax as required by the Texas Tax Code.” As well as asking for a permanent injunction to prohibit the city and ATP “from spending the Project Connect tax on designing, acquiring right-of-way or constructing the Third Street rail route or the Trinity Street Bridge over Lady Bird Lake.”

The case is set to be heard in court on May 28–30, 2024, however, Paxton has attempted to push the hearing until after the 2024 legislative elections seemingly in an effort to reintroduce House Bill 3899, or a similar variant. House Bill 3899 was introduced by Ellen Troxclair (R-19), a former member of the Austin City Council, which would have frozen the project until a new referendum could be held. Despite easily passing the house three times, the bill would be defeated in the Texas Senate each time, triggering the three-reading rule, which prohibits a bill from being read in a single legislative session more than three times. Additionally, Paxton has full authority to approve or deny any entity that wants to issue debt in the state.
