= Crestview station =

Hybrid rail station in Austin, Texas

Crestview
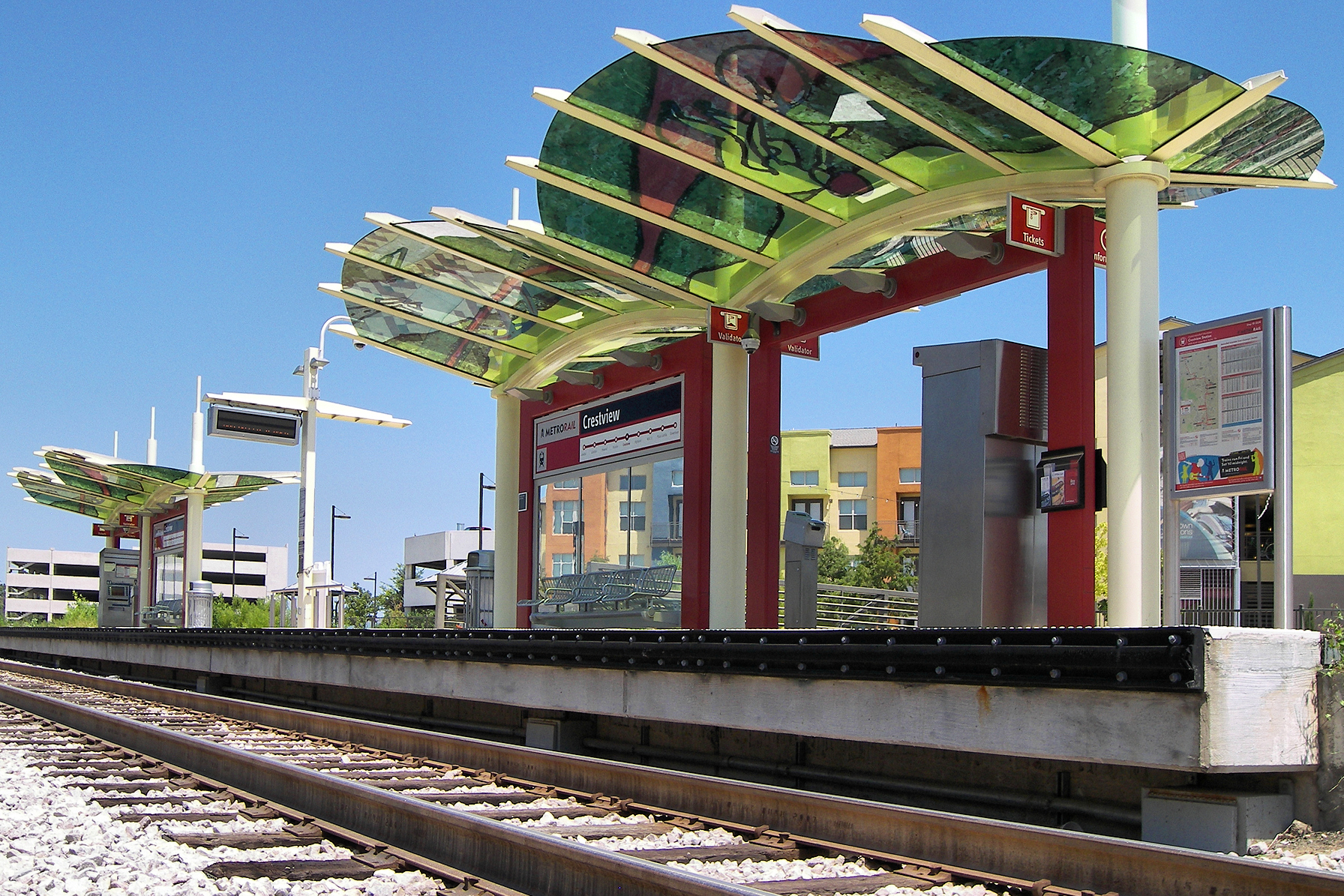
- Platform at Crestview station

General information
- Location: 6920 North Lamar Boulevard; Austin, TX
- Coordinates: 30°20′18″N 97°43′9″W
- Owner: CapMetro
- Platforms: 1 side platform
- Connections: MetroBus 1, 7, 300, 350; MetroRapid 801

Construction
- Parking: No
- Accessible: Yes

History
- Opened: March 22, 2010

Services
Preceding station	CapMetro Rail	Following station
McKalla toward Leander	Red Line	Highland toward Downtown
Future services
Preceding station	CapMetro Rail	Following station
North Lamar Transit Center Terminus	Blue Line	Koenig toward Austin–Bergstrom International Airport
North Lamar Transit Center Terminus	Orange Line	Koenig toward Stassney
Location

Crestview station is a CapMetro Rail hybrid rail station and CapMetro Rapid bus rapid transit station in Austin, Texas. It is at the edge of the Crestview neighborhood of North Austin, at the corner of Airport Boulevard and North Lamar Boulevard. The North Lamar Transit Center is one mile (1.6 km) north of the station, and the Highland Mall Transit Center (across from the Highland station) is 1/2 mile (0.8 km) to the southeast. There is no on-site parking at the Crestview station. Riders must park at the North Lamar Transit center and take buses 1 or 801 south to the train. With Project Connect, the Blue and Orange Lines will have a connection to this station.

== Location ==
Crestview station sits on the former site of a Huntsman Petroleum Research and Development center which operated there from 1949 until 2005. Trammel Crow Co. and Stratus Properties Inc. bought the site in 2005 and led a large clean-up effort. During the clean-up, known carcinogen benzene was found in a small amount in the southwestern part of the property. However, the benzene was found to be in saturated soil and posed no threat to people.

== Pedestrian connectivity ==
A local civic group, Sustainable Neighborhoods of North Central Austin, in 2009 identified the Crestview-Highland segment of CapMetro's Rails with Trails project as its "Project of the Year". The trail, intended to run beside the commuter track, would provide pedestrian and bicycle access to the station from surrounding neighborhoods. One of the largest transit oriented developments in Austin is centered on the Crestview Station.

== Bus connections ==
- #1 N. Lamar/S. Congress
- #7 Duval/Dove Springs (terminus)
- #300 Springdale/Oltorf (terminus)
- #350 Airport Blvd.
- #481 Night Owl N. Lamar
- #801 N. Lamar/S. Congress Rapid
