= Blue Line (CapMetro) =

Planned light rail line in Austin, Texas

Overview
- Status: In the planning and environmental review stage
- Locale: Austin, Texas
- Termini: 38th St Station; Yellow Jacket
- Stations: 13

Service
- Type: Light rail
- System: Capital MetroRail
- Operator: Capital Metropolitan Transportation Authority
- Rolling stock: 21 Stadler Citylink

History
- Planned opening: 2033

Technical
- Character: At-grade, Elevated

The Blue Line is a planned light rail line to connect Austin–Bergstrom International Airport with downtown Austin, Texas. It is still in the planning stages as a part of CapMetro's Project Connect. It was estimated to begin revenue service as early as 2033.

== History ==
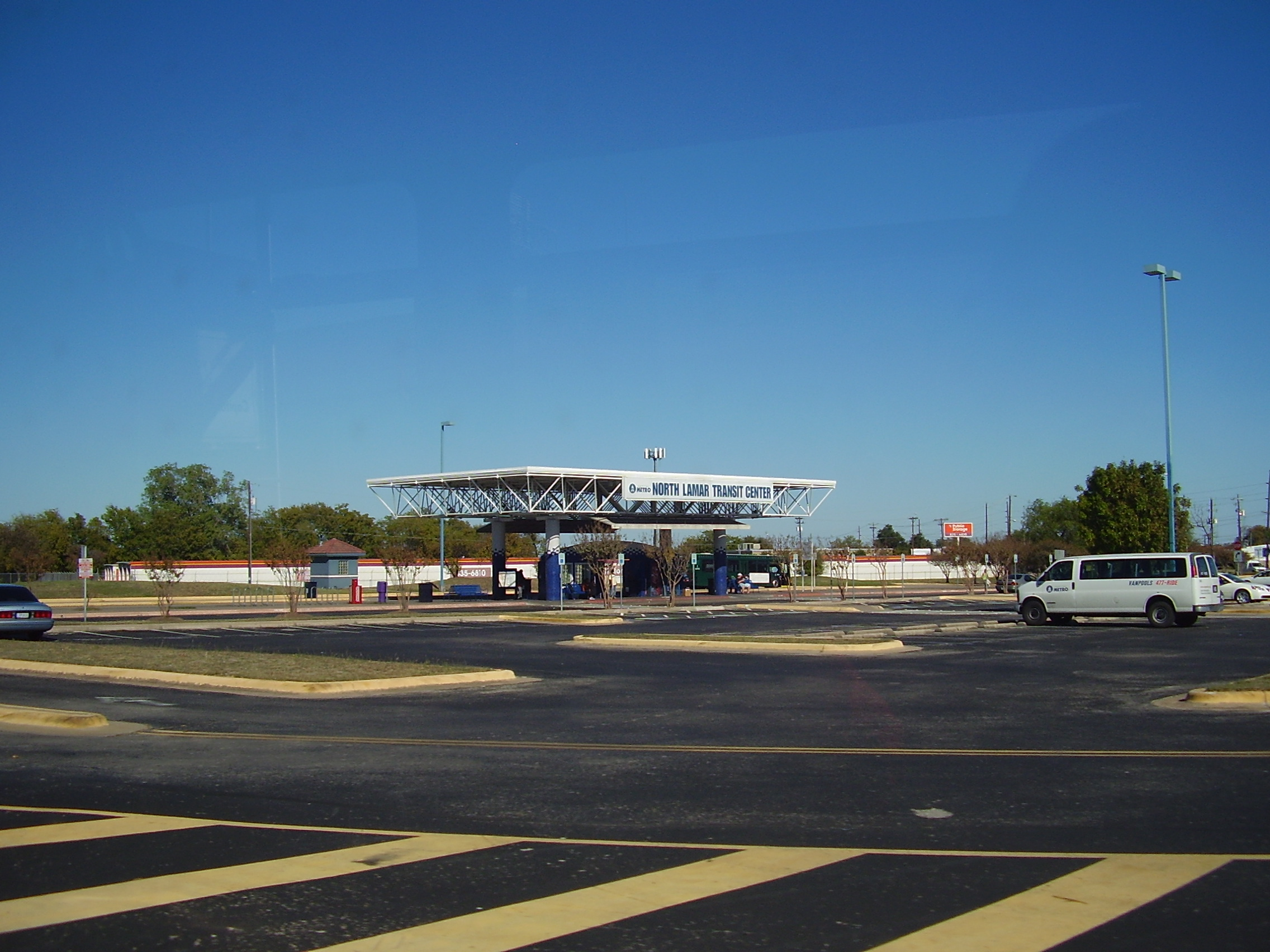
North Lamar Transit Center, the planned northern terminus of the line, seen in 2008

Austin's 2013 East Riverside Corridor Plan called for high-capacity transit to be installed along East Riverside Drive. This became part of the original Blue Line, which failed to find support in 2014 and was shelved. The Gold Line was formed from a segment of this original proposal, and is expected to be built as a separate bus rapid transit line.

In 2018, CapMetro announced a new long-range planning project entitled Project Connect that outlines several major transit corridors consisting of commuter rail, light rail, and bus rapid transit. The Blue Line corridor will include a transit pathway for a light rail or bus rapid transit line running on the west side of Downtown Austin to Austin–Bergstrom International Airport in southeast Austin. The line was included as part of the Project Connect referendum during the 2020 election.

== Proposed route ==
A new bridge over Lady Bird Lake is planned to carry the line into the Downtown Transit Tunnel.

Stations are listed south to north, from Austin–Bergstrom International Airport to the North Lamar Transit Center:

Station	Parking	Rail connections	Bus connections	Nearby points of interest
Airport	Yes		CapMetro Bus 20, 483, CARTS 1518	Austin–Bergstrom International Airport
Yellow Jacket	No		CapMetro Bus 20, 271	Austin Airport Hotels
Montopolis	No		CapMetro Bus 20, 217, 271	Montopolis Park, IDEA Montopolis
Grove	No		CapMetro Bus 20, 217, 271, 310, 311, 350	Austin Public Library, Riverside Golf Course, ACC Riverside
Pleasant Valley	Yes		CapMetro Rapid 800 CapMetro Bus 20, 228, 300, 483	Park Greene Shopping Center, HEB Plus
Lakeshore	Yes		CapMetro Bus 7, 20, 483, 670, 672	Oracle Corporation, Ann and Roy Butler Hike and Bike Trail, Lady Bird Lake
Waterfront	No	Orange Line	CapMetro Bus 7, 20, 483	South Congress, Texas Department of Transportation, Austin American-Statesman, Lady Bird Lake
Cesar Chavez	No	Orange Line	CapMetro Bus 2, 490, 493	Emma S. Barrientos Mexican American Cultural Center
Congress Avenue	No	Orange Line	CapMetro Rapid 801, 803, 837 CapMetro Bus 1, 2, 3, 4, 5, 7, 10, 20, 30,	
Woodridge Square	No	Orange Line	CapMetro Rapid 801, 803; CapMetro Bus 1, 3, 20, 30, 105, 985	Wooldridge Square Park, Austin Public Library, Travis County Civil Courthouse. Texas State Capitol, Travis County Adult Probation, Texas Alliance of Child and Family Services
15th St	No	Orange Line	CapMetro Rapid 801, 803 CapMetro Bus 1, 3, 20, 30,	Texas Capitol, Capitol Mall, Bullock Museum, Blanton Museum of Art
UT	No	Orange Line	CapMetro Rapid 801, 803; CapMetro Bus 1, 3, 19, 20, 105, 640, 982, 990	University of Texas at Austin, Peter T. Flawn Academic Center, Goldsmith Hall, Sutton Hall, Battle Hall, Parlin Hall, Rainey Hall, Harry Ransom Center, West Campus
29th St	No	Orange Line	CapMetro Rapid 801, 803; CapMetro Bus 1, 3, 30	Hemphill Park, University of Texas at Austin, Phi Gamma Delta, Scottish Rite Dormitory
38th St	No	Orange Line	CapMetro Rapid 801; CapMetro Bus 1, 335, 656, 982	Hyde Park, Austin State Hospital, Central Market, Heart Hospital of Austin
