= Gold Line (CapMetro) =

Proposed bus rapid transit line in Austin, Texas

Overview
- Status: In planning
- Locale: Austin, Texas
- Termini: Highland station; South Congress Transit Center
- Stations: 15

Service
- Type: Bus rapid transit
- System: CapMetro Rapid
- Operator(s): Capital Metropolitan Transportation Authority

Technical
- Line length: 9.5 mi (15.3 km)

The Gold Line is a proposed transitway for connecting North Central Austin and the Downtown's Eastside to South Austin. It is in the planning stages as a part of Capital Metro's Project Connect. According to the plan, the line will be initially be operated as a bus rapid transit line prior to future conversion to light rail. It was estimated to open in 2024 but was delayed indefinitely by CapMetro.

The initial line is 9.5 miles (15.3 km) in length and would operate from ACC Highland to the South Congress Transit Center park-and-ride, and will travel on Airport, Red River, San Jacinto/Trinity, 7th/8th, Neches/Red River, 4th, Riverside, and South Congress. Stations will be ACC Highland, Clarkson, Hancock, St. David's, UT East, Medical School, Capitol East, Trinity, Downtown Station (where transfer to the Red, Green, or Blue Lines will be possible), Republic Square, Auditorium Shores, SoCo (South Congress), Oltorf, St. Edward's, and South Congress Transit Center.

The line was originally envisioned as the northern section of the Blue Line light rail, which was part of the city's failed 2014 rail plan. The line was there after planned to be built as lower-cost bus rapid transit. The project shifted planning in May 2020 to again construct it as light rail, citing a demographic that showed an increased projected ridership along the route. In July 2020, to lower construction costs in response to the economic crisis caused by the COVID-19 pandemic, the plan was reverted to the line being constructed as a bus service.
