= South Congress Transit Center =

Bus station in Austin, Texas

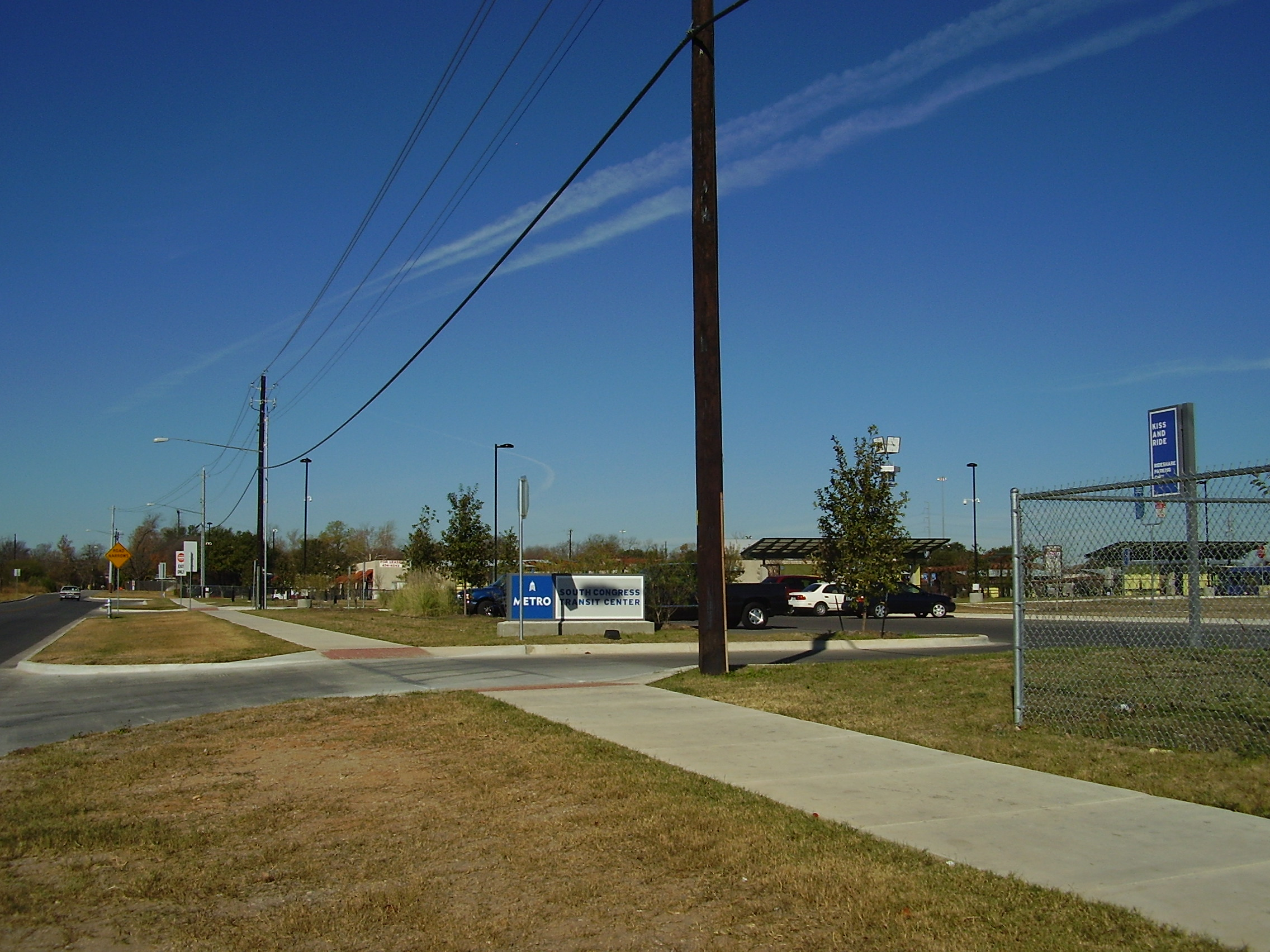

General information
- Location: 301 W. Ben White Blvd; Austin, Texas 78704
- Coordinates: 30.2233°N 97.7664°W
- Owner: CapMetro
- Connections: CapMetro Bus 1, 310, 315; CapMetro Rapid 801

Construction
- Parking: 61 spaces
- Accessible: Yes
Location

South Congress Transit Center is a Capital Metropolitan Transportation Authority bus station in Austin, Texas. It is located off of Radam Lane on the south side of Ben White Boulevard, just west of South Congress Avenue in the SoCo area of Austin, Texas. The station features a park and ride lot and is served by several local bus routes as well as CapMetro Rapid Route 801. As part of a future phase of Project Connect, a CapMetro Rail light rail station is expected to be built at the facility.
