= Westgate Transit Center =

Bus station in Austin, Texas

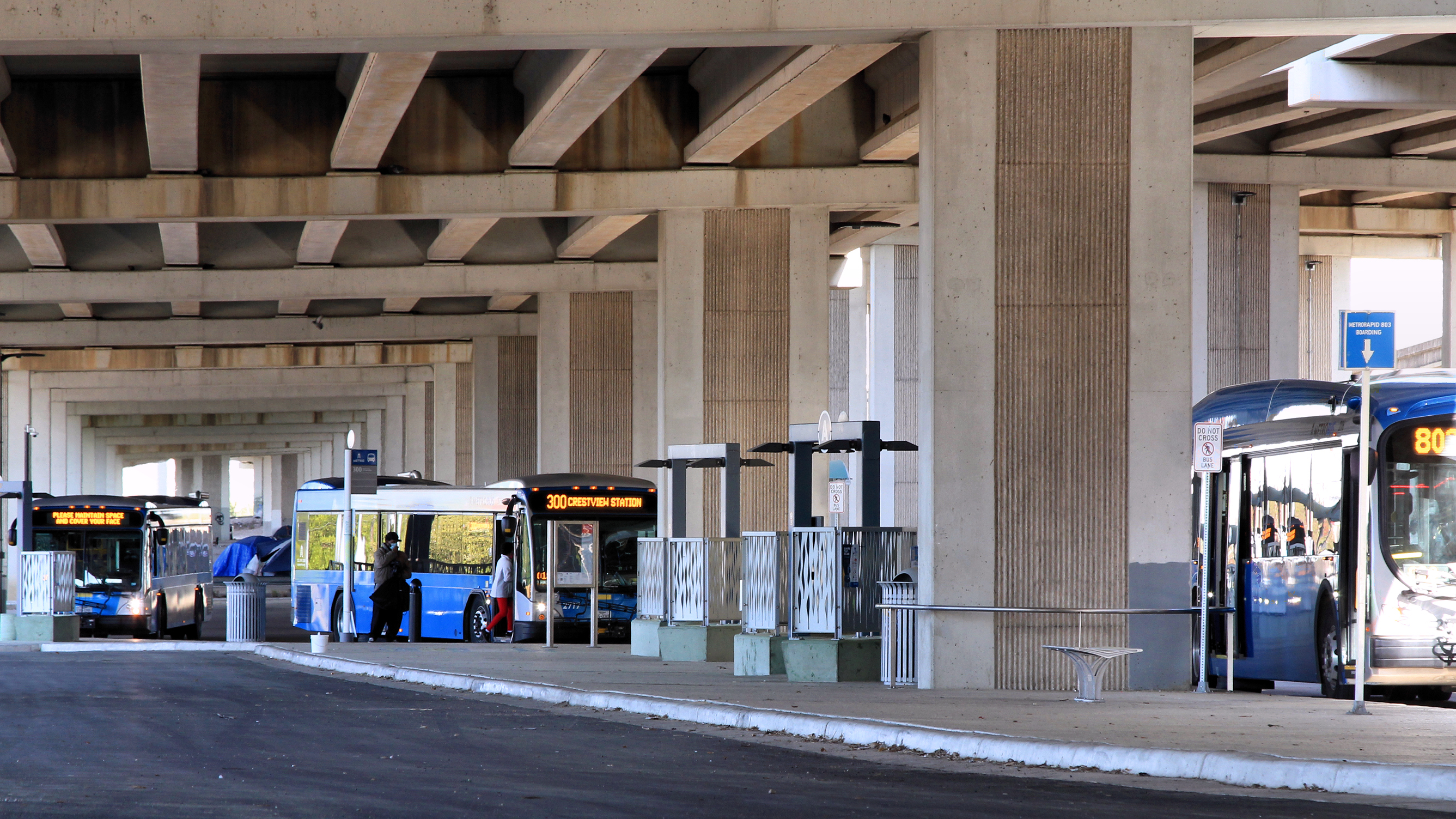

General information
- Location: 2027 W. Ben White Blvd; Austin, Texas 78704
- Coordinates: 30.2309°N 97.7903°W
- Owner: CapMetro
- Connections: CapMetro Bus 3, 30, 300, 311, 315, 318]] CapMetro Rapid 803

Construction
- Parking: 200 spaces
- Accessible: Yes

History
- Opened: 2019
Location

Westgate Transit Center is a Capital Metropolitan Transportation Authority bus station in Austin, Texas. It is located underneath the elevated freeway of Ben White Boulevard (US 290-SH 71), in between Packsaddle Pass and Menchaca Road. The station features a park and ride lot with over 200 parking spaces, and is served by several local bus routes as well as CapMetro Rapid Route 803. The station is the terminus of multiple routes; particularly MetroRapid Route 803 which provides express access to downtown and points north.

The facility opened in 2019 after CapMetro was unable to negotiate a parking lease deal with the previous terminus in the Westgate Shopping Center located at South Lamar and Westgate Boulevards. The transit center uniquely provides shaded covered parking by making use of the empty space underneath the SH 71-US 290 freeway.
