= Highland station (CapMetro Rail) =

Hybrid rail station in Austin, Texas

Highland
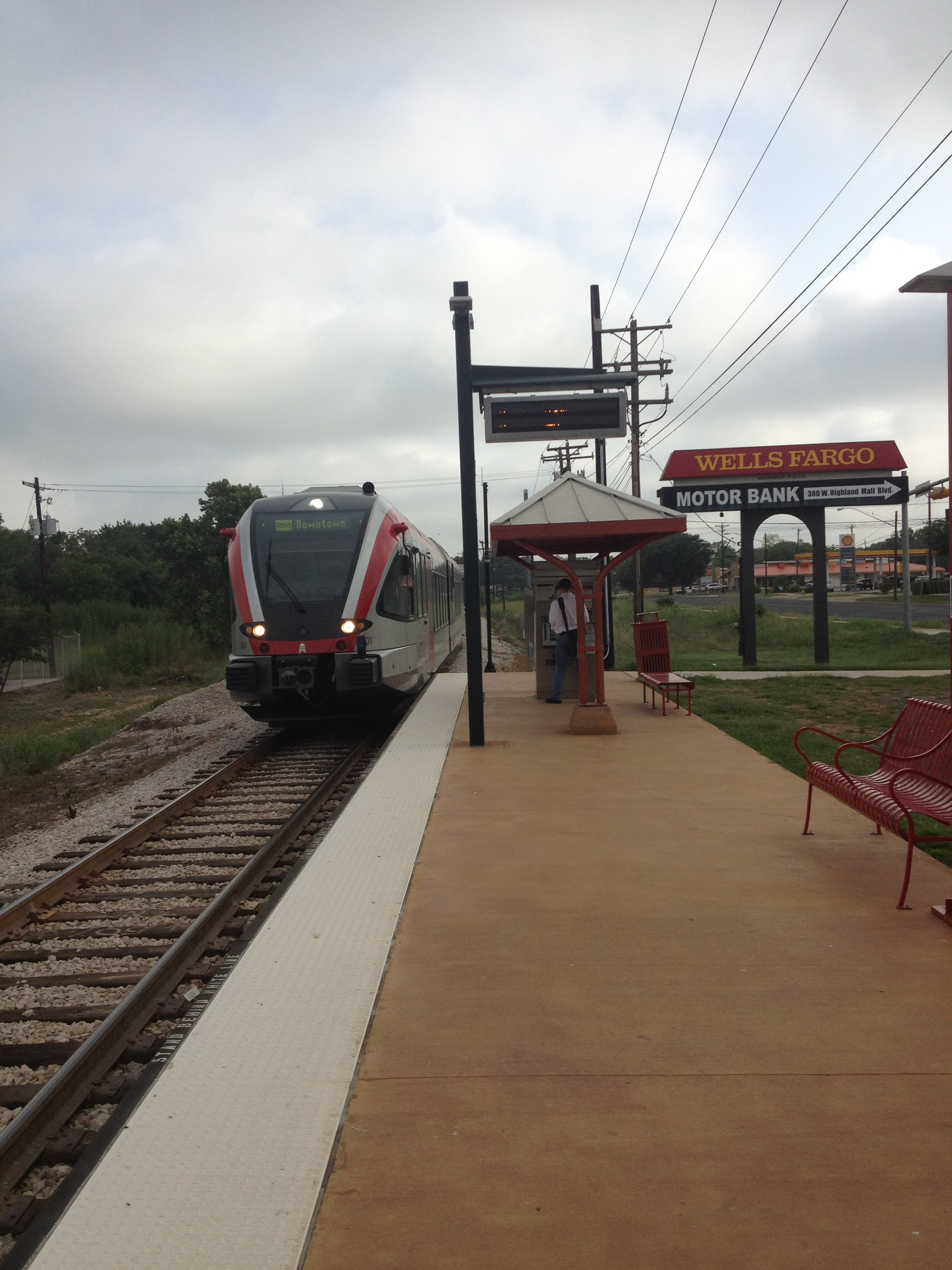

General information
- Location: 6420½ Airport Boulevard; Austin, Texas
- Coordinates: 30.329039°N 97.715833°W
- Owner: CapMetro
- Platforms: 1 side platform
- Connections: CapMetro Bus 7, 324, 337, 350; Greyhound Lines

Construction
- Parking: No
- Cycle facilities: Yes
- Accessible: Yes

History
- Opened: March 22, 2010

Services
Preceding station	CapMetro Rail	Following station
Crestview toward Leander	Red Line	MLK Jr. toward Downtown
Location

Highland station is a CapMetro Rail hybrid rail station in Austin, Texas. It is located in northeast Austin at the intersection of Airport Boulevard and Highland Mall Boulevard, just northwest of the I-35/Highway 290 interchange directly across the street from Highland Mall.

The station is within a 15-minute walking distance of the Austin Greyhound Terminal located at 916 E Koenig Ln, Austin, TX 78751.

This is the planned northern terminus of the Gold Line bus rapid transit line.

== Bus connections ==
The station is served by CapMetro Bus routes:

- #7 Duval/Dove Springs
- #324 Ohlen/Georgian
- #337 Koenig/Colony Park
- #350 Airport Blvd.

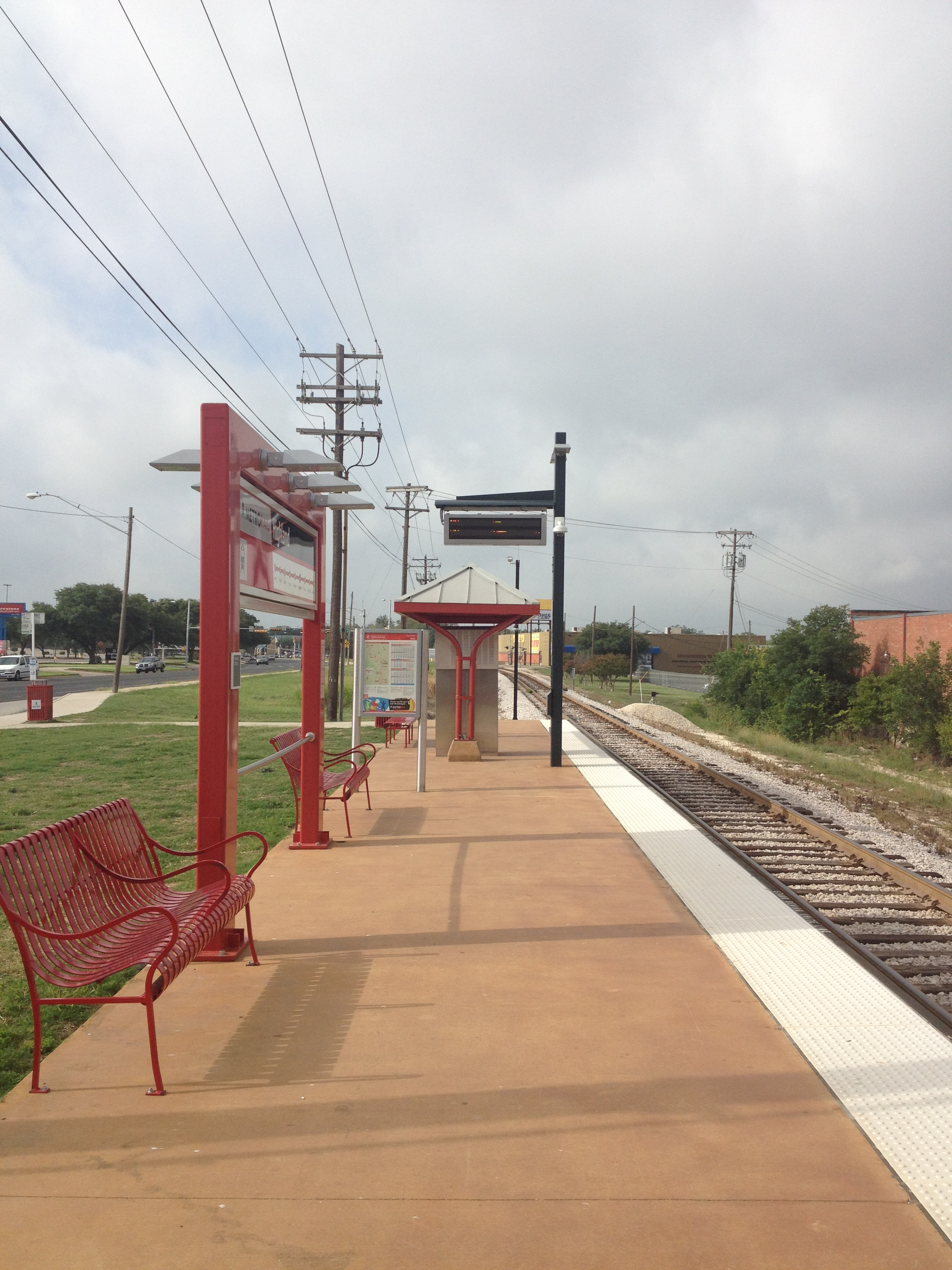
Platform view to the south, 2012
