= Williamson Creek Greenbelt =

Park and greenbelt located in Austin, Texas

Coordinates: 30.1879°N 97.7562°W

Shows Williamson Creek West Greenbelt, Williamson Creek West Greenbelt at Lantana (both denoted in red), Williamson Creek Central Greenbelt (denoted in purple) and Williamson Creek East Greenbelt (denoted in black). Hot pink represents the creek route)

Williamson Creek Greenbelt is a park and greenbelt located in the south of Austin, Texas, running along Williamson Creek and its tributaries.

== History ==
The park was dedicated in 1977 both as parkland and as a drainage easement. The park has been gradually expanded through donations and purchases. In 1991, 5 acres (20,000 m^{2}) were added to the park in donation from Eli Garza; this donation became involved in a lengthy legal battle involving both the city of Austin and the bordering city of Sunset Valley, TX, when Garza attempted to sell land, which was part of neither city, to Lowe's. In 1993, the city of Austin purchased land adding 13.6 acres (55,000 m^{2}) to Williamson Creek Greenbelt and Dove Springs District Park. In 2006, there were protests over a federal proposal for the United States Army Corps of Engineers to widen the creek in four areas in order to mitigate flooding in other neighborhoods. Local residents were concerned that this proposal would be negatively affected by this excavation.

== Environmental value ==
Williamson creek, running through the park, is fed by a number of unnamed tributaries which are in turn fed by perennial springs of the St. Elmo Bench aquifer. Some of the tributaries are heavily wooded, and the area been recognized as environmentally sensitive by the city of Austin. Together with Kensington Park it is the most extensively studied and documented areas of environmental value in southeast Austin.

By 1989, Williamson Creek Greenbelt had been infested with oak wilt, a non-native fungus.
