= Highland Mall =

Defunct mall in Austin, Texas, U.S.

Austin Community College Highland Campus
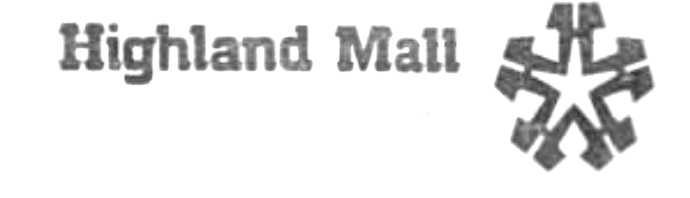

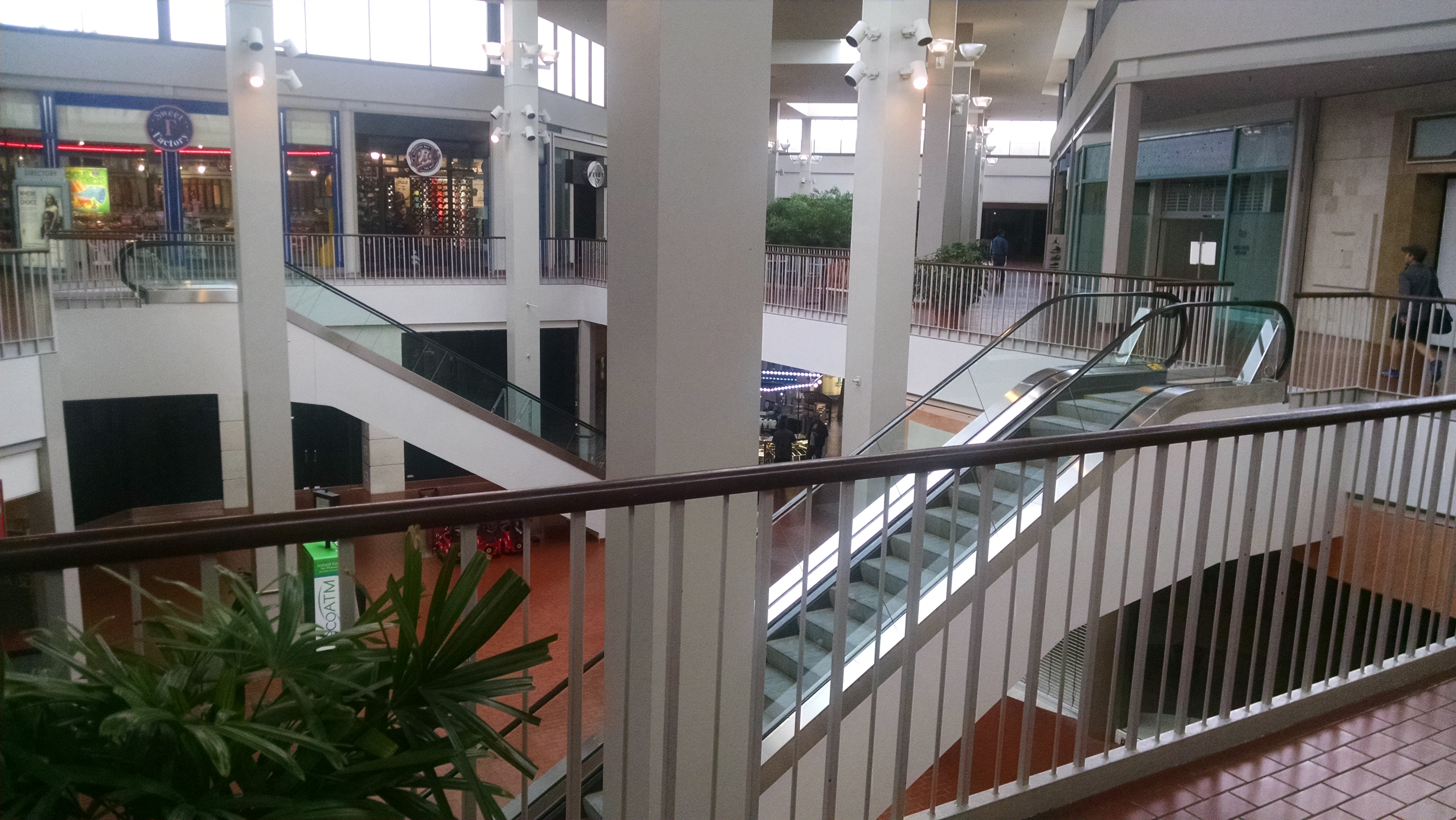
- Center court (November 2014)
- Location: Austin, Texas, U.S.
- Coordinates: 30.326°N 97.714°W
- Opened: August 4, 1971; 55 years ago
- Closed: April 30, 2015; 11 years ago (as Highland Mall)
- Previous names: Highland Mall (1971–2015)
- Developer: Austin Malls, Inc.
- Manager: RedLeaf Properties (ACC Highland Campus); GGP and JLL (retail space only)
- Owner: Austin Community College District
- Num. of stores: 130+ (at peak)
- Num. of anchor tenants: 4 (at peak)
- Floor area: 575,334 square feet (53,450.3 m^{2})
- Floors: 2 (4 in former Dillard's Womens)
- Public transit: Highland station
- Website: acc.com/highland highlandmall.com (2011 archive)
- Building details
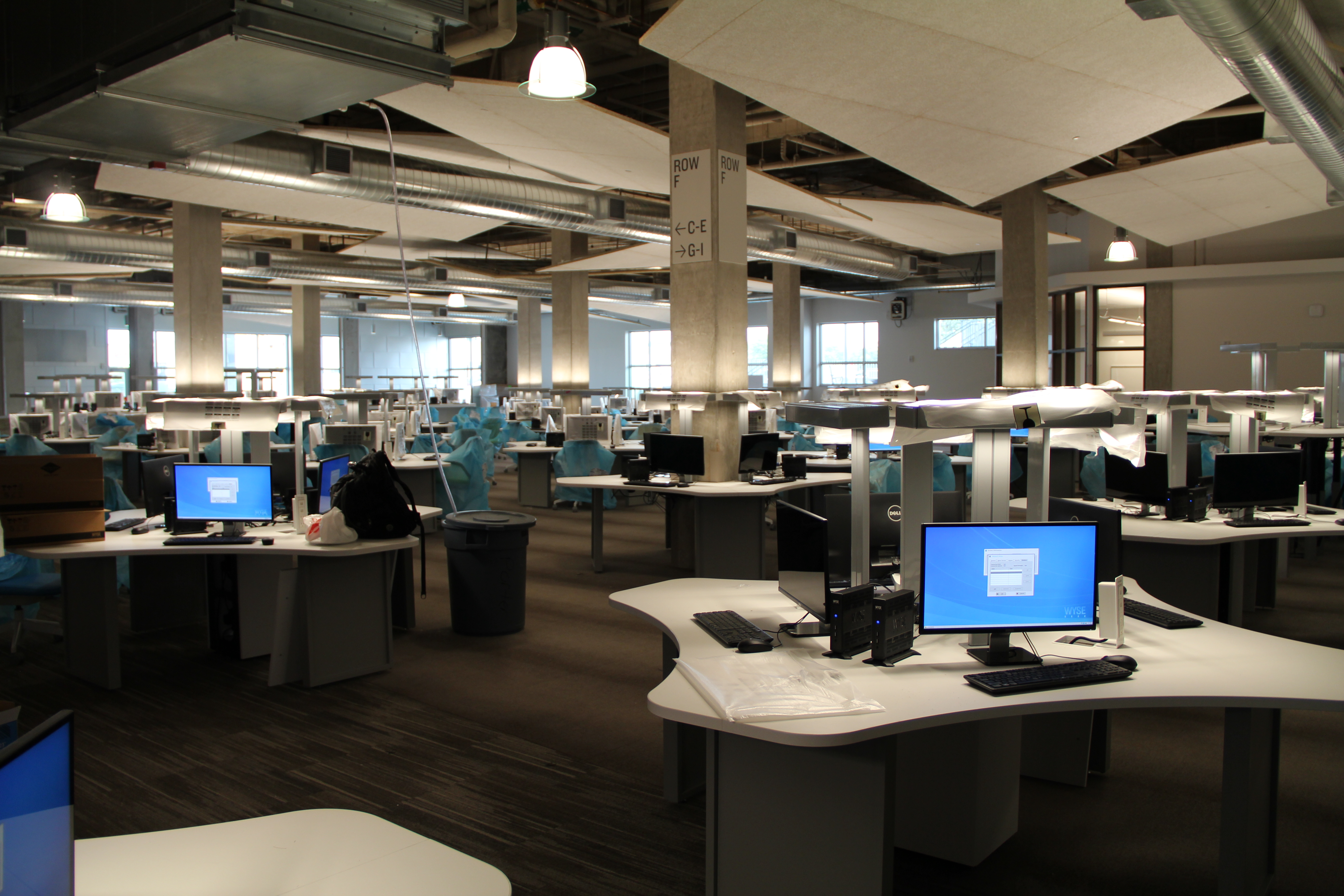
- ACC Highland Campus ACCelerator in July 2014

General information
- Status: Operational (as a college; defunct as a shopping mall)
- Type: Shopping mall (1971–2015); Community college (2015–present)

ACC Highland Campus is a community college operated by the Austin Community College District, adjacent to retail space. It was formerly known as Highland Mall, which was a shopping mall located in north Austin, Texas, United States, on Airport Boulevard west of I-35 and north of US Route 290. Opened in 1971, Highland Mall was Austin's first suburban shopping mall. Highland Mall was jointly owned by General Growth Properties and Simon Property Group until 2011. On April 30, 2015, Highland Mall officially closed its doors; the space has since been repurposed primarily as a campus for Austin Community College.

== History ==
Highland Mall opened on August 4, 1971, developed by Austin Malls, Inc., a subsidiary of The Rouse Company. Prior to the construction of the mall, the land was originally home to the St. John's Industrial Institute and Home for Negro Orphans, which burned down in the 1940s.

The mall, which was Austin's first enclosed mall, was originally anchored by JCPenney, Austin-based Scarbrough's, and San Antonio-based Joske's. In 1987, Joske's was acquired by Dillard's; the store received a complete renovation in 1993. In 1992, Dillard's opened a second store in the mall in the space that formerly housed Scarbrough's.

=== Decline and closure ===
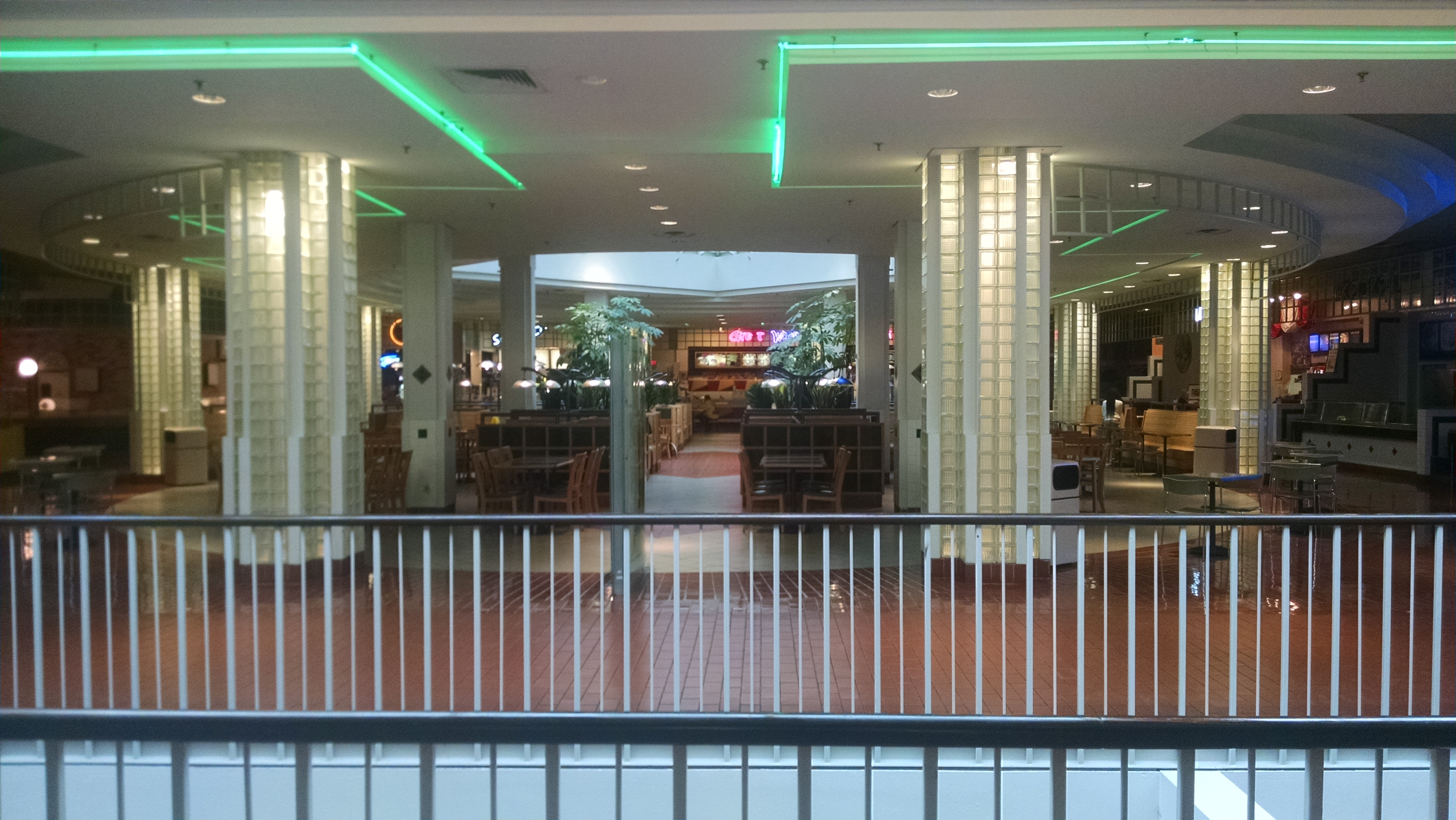
The vacant food court in 2014

By 2008, two of the mall's seven retail sectors were closed. Press reports described the mall as "in decline" and that the mall was "likely to be demolished in 2010" to make way for a mixed-used development.

On June 26, 2009, Yahoo! reported that it was one of "America's Most Endangered Malls":

While gleaming new stores have been springing up in some parts of Austin, this 38-year-old mall along I-35 has struggled to keep stores open--and avoid embarrassing controversies. Anchor JCPenney left in 2006, and this year Dillard's sued the mall's owners, claiming they let the mall become a ghost town. The owners countersued, claiming that the suit is part of a scheme to help Dillard's get out of its lease early.

— Rick Newman, Yahoo! Finance

As Austin grew and expanded in the years since Highland Mall's opening, the demographics of the surrounding neighborhoods, once considered somewhat upscale, remained stagnant; the mall is the closest major regional shopping center serving the eastern portion of the city, which has traditionally been populated primarily by working-class African American residents. Highland Mall had developed a reputation for large crowds of visitors to the mall during the Texas Relays (a major track and field event held at the University of Texas at Austin), generating controversy and allegations of racial discrimination, or at the least, a less-than-welcoming attitude, on the part of mall management towards the visitors, mainly younger African Americans, many who visit from out-of-state. During the 2009 Texas Relays, management decided to close the mall several hours earlier than normal, presumably in an attempt to control the crowds and promote safety, prompting protests from the local chapter of the NAACP and a possible boycott of the mall (all part of a larger controversy over perceived negative attitudes in Austin towards the Texas Relays and its largely younger Black fan base, which uses the Relays as a social event comparable to the controversial Freaknik events in Atlanta in the early 2000s).

Charles Heimsath, president of an Austin-based real estate research firm, suggested that local malls such as Barton Creek Square and The Domain siphoned off clientele from Highland Mall. Despite Highland Mall's relative proximity and convenience to the University of Texas at Austin, many UT students elect to use these other shopping venues.

On June 3, 2009, the Austin Chronicle reported that Austin's professional soccer team, the Austin Aztex, were interested in using part of the site for a soccer stadium. The site would have also included "pedestrian-friendly street frontage in a mixed-use design, rapid bus transit and rail right across the street, and structured parking." Grassroots Austin Stadium Supporters (GRASS) was a group that has formed to push for the stadium project.

In January 2012, GGP spun off 30 underperforming properties, including Highland Mall, into a new company called Rouse Properties.

On September 1, 2012, Rouse filed for bankruptcy.

On April 30, 2015, Highland Mall officially closed after 44 business years. The adjacent retail spaces remained operated by Rouse Properties until July 2016, when the firm was acquired by Brookfield Asset Management. Jones Lang LaSalle also handles operations of the retail spaces.

=== Redevelopment ===
==== Acquisition by ACC ====
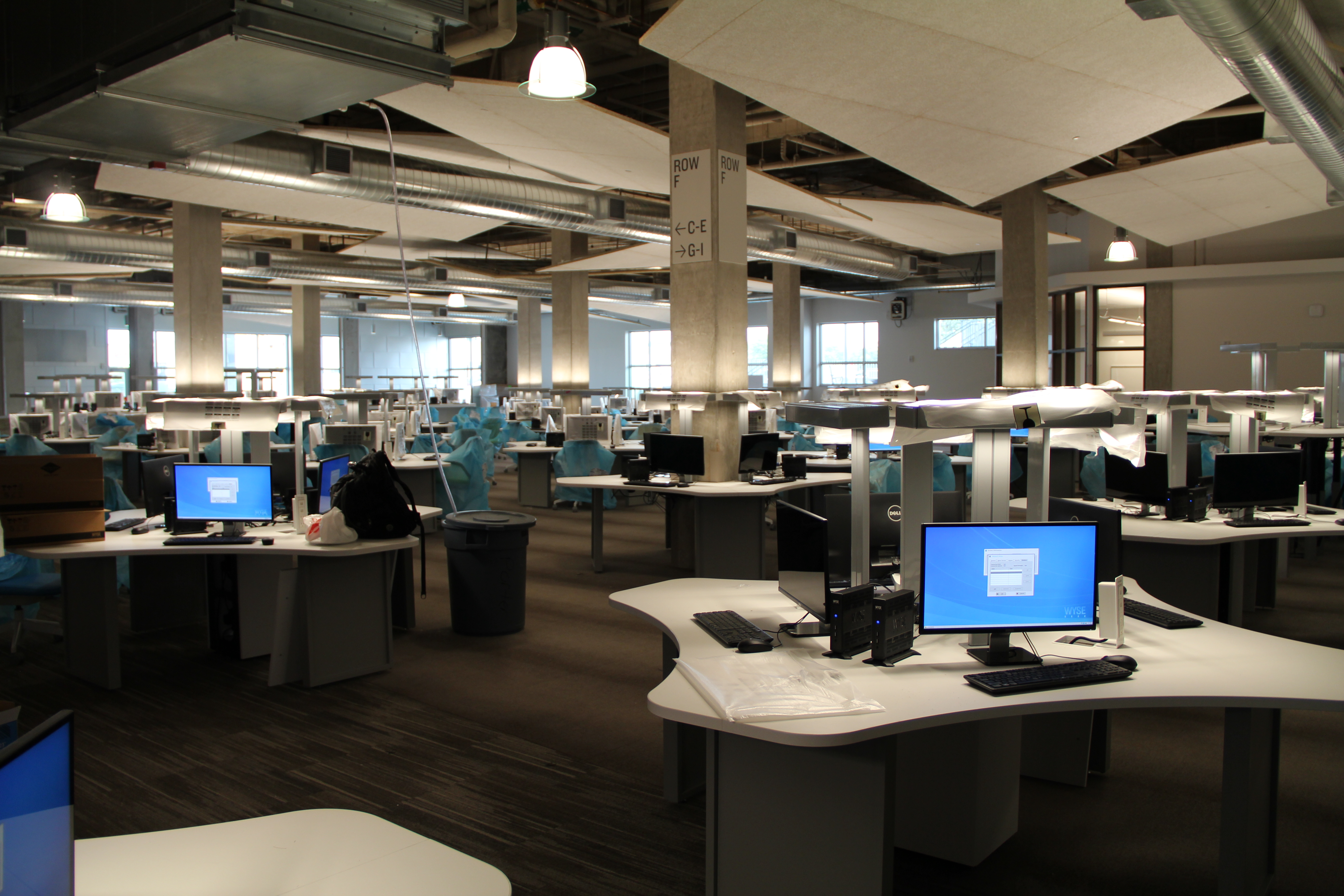
The ACCelerator lab at ACC Highland Campus, located in the former JCPenney space

In 2012, Austin Community College purchased Highland Mall to redevelop the site as a regional education center. The first phase of ACC's Highland Campus opened in Fall 2014. The first phase includes classrooms, labs, study areas, library and media center, student commons, and ACCelerator, a 600-station learning lab for individualized instruction through technology.

Preparation is underway for additional redevelopment at Highland Mall. Plans call for a digital and creative media cluster, expanded information technology programs, culinary and hospitality center, professional incubator space, an advanced manufacturing center, workforce innovation center, and regional health sciences center with simulator lab.

In 2017, Rackspace announced plans to open an office in the former Dillard's anchor space, but plans were shelved when the company was acquired by an outside investor. In 2018, it was announced that the former Dillard's store would be remodeled into a two-level television studio that will house Austin PBS affiliate KLRU as well as ACC's television station.

Over the long term, space not used by the college at the Highland Mall site will be available for private mixed-use development. Various mixed-use apartment and retail buildings have opened in the mall's former parking lot; the east side of the parking lot has been repurposed in to an urban park called "St. John's Encampment Commons", referencing the former African-American Baptist encampment that took place on the site. As of January 2026, GGP, a subsidiary of Brookfield Properties, and JLL Properties, a subsidiary of Jones Lang LaSalle, only owns the surrounding retail space.

=== Anchors ===
- Joske's/Dillard's Women/KLRU Studios - The former Joske's location at the south end of the mall when it purchased the entire Joske's chain by Dillard's in 1987. Dillard's closed in May 2009.
- JCPenney/ACC Building 1000 - JCPenney, an original tenant when the mall opened in 1971, closed its anchor store in Highland Mall on September 30, 2006.
- Scarbrough's/Dillard's Men - The Dillard's Men's store occupied the anchor store location originally held by Scarbrough's, once Austin's largest locally owned department store chain, from 1992 to 2011.
- Foley's/Macy's - The former Foley's anchor store was renamed Macy's in September 2006 as a result of Federated Department Stores' purchase of the May Company in 2005. Macy's closed in March 2011.

== Gallery ==
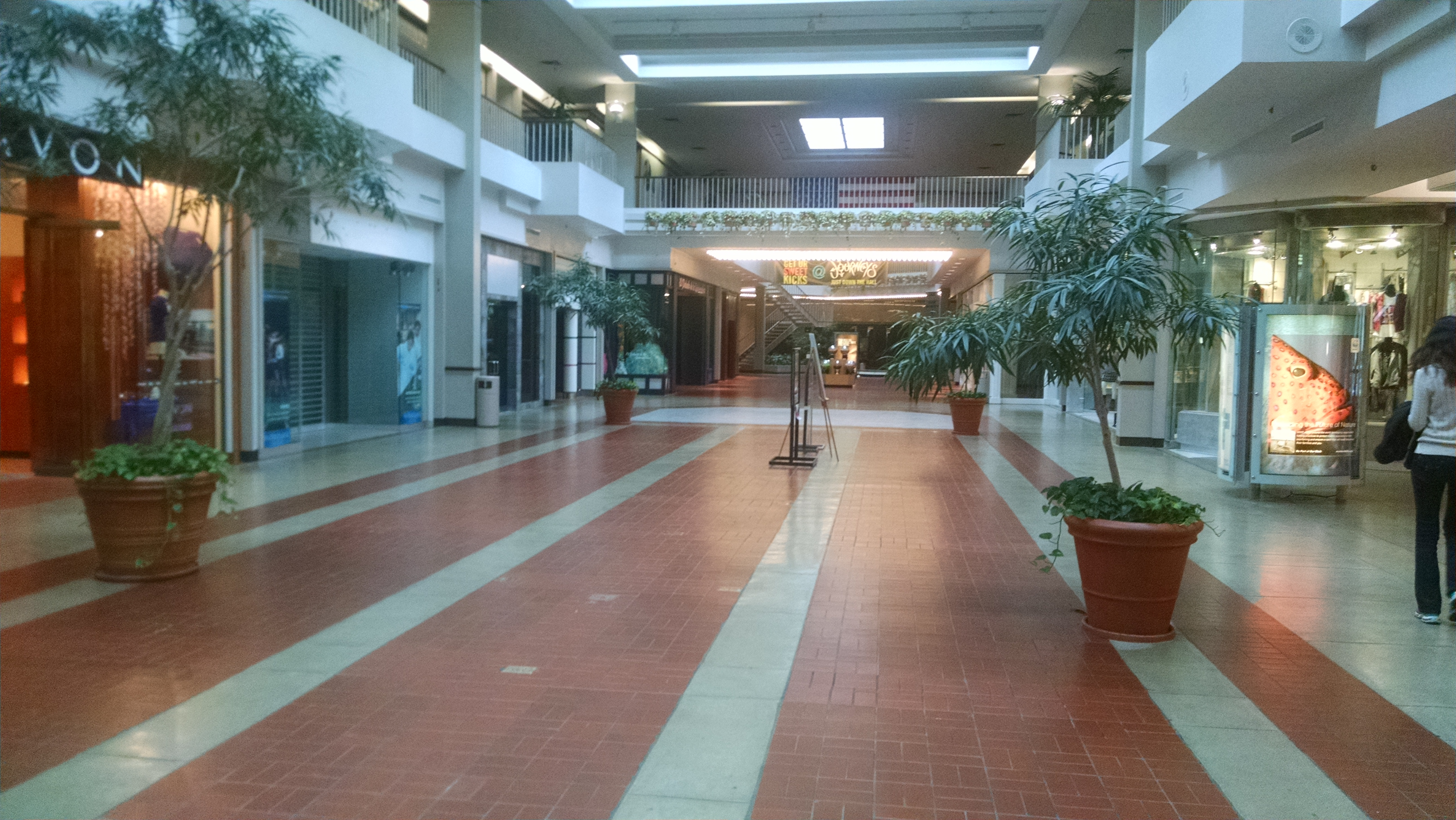
Empty mall corridor in 2014

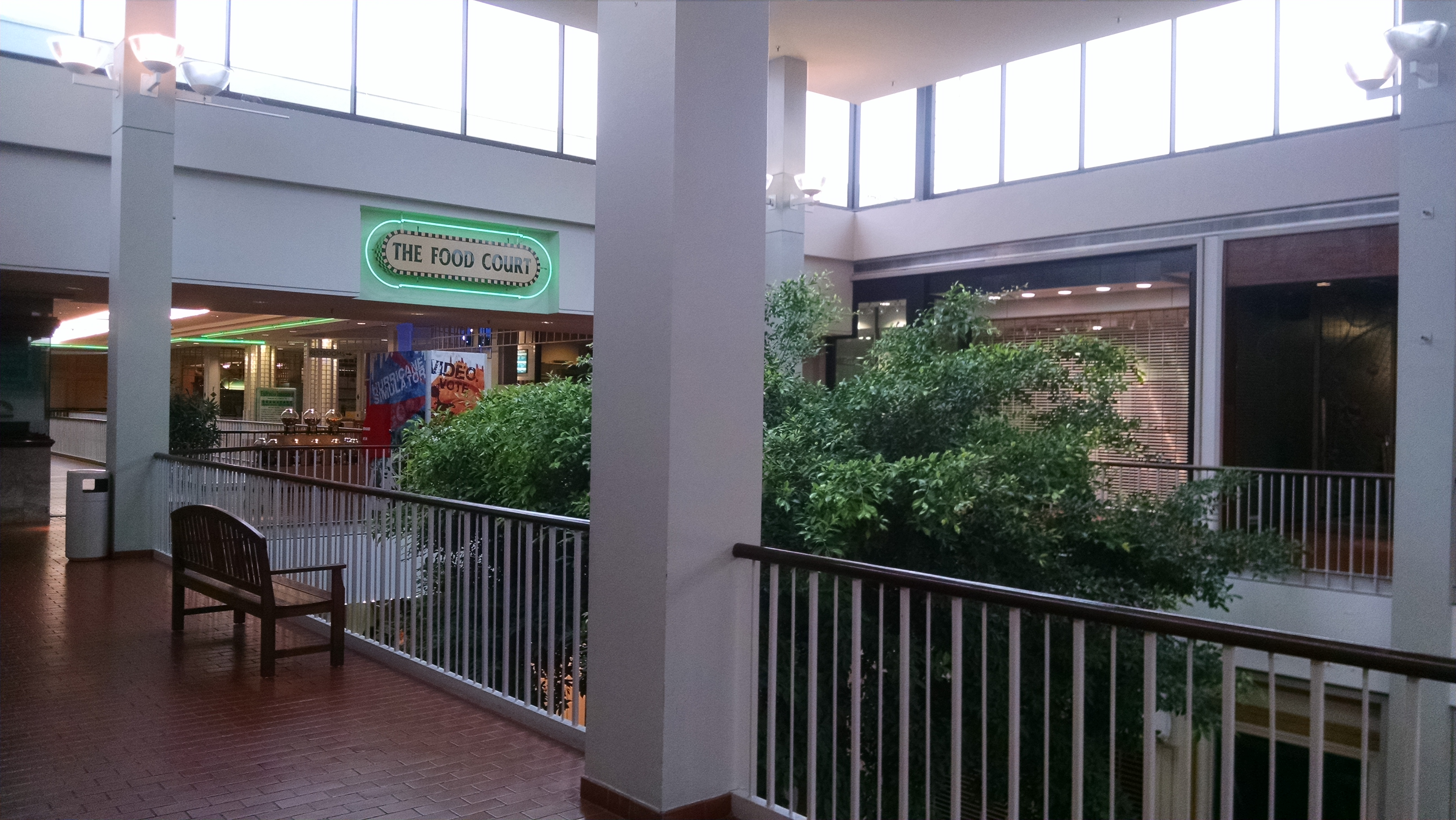
Food court entrance in 2014
