= Austin State Hospital =

Building in Austin, Texas, U.S.

- U.S. National Register of Historic Places
- Recorded Texas Historic Landmark
- Texas State Antiquities Landmark
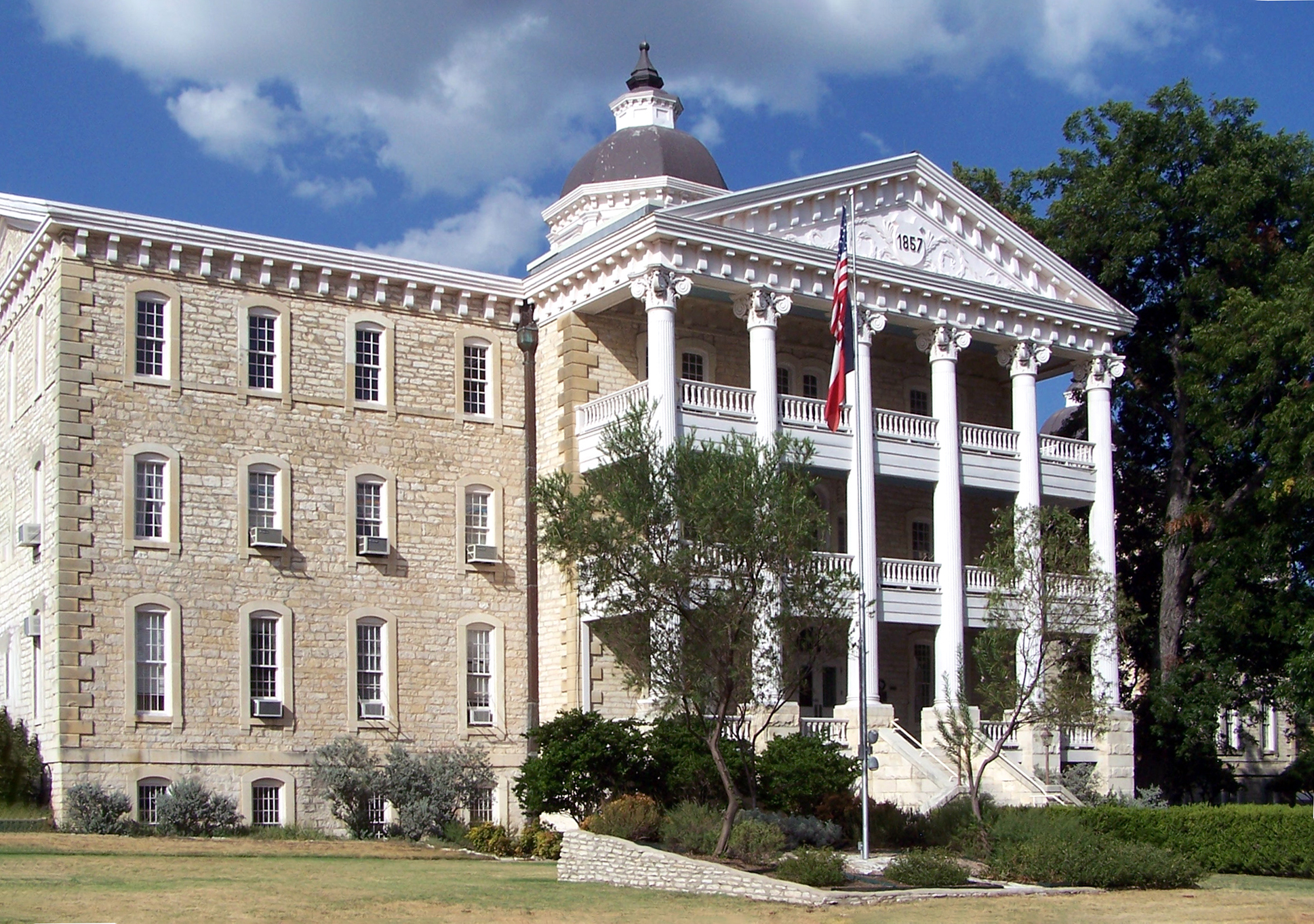
- The former State Lunatic Asylum is now the administration building for the Austin State Hospital campus.
- Location: 4110 Guadalupe, Austin, Texas, U.S.
- Coordinates: 30°18′26.64″N 97°44′13.92″W
- Built: 1857
- Architect: Charles Payne
- Architectural style: Classical Revival
- NRHP reference No.: 87002115
- RTHL No.: 15648
- TSAL No.: 598

Significant dates
- Added to NRHP: December 4, 1987
- Designated RTHL: 1966
- Designated TSAL: 7/20/1999

Austin State Hospital (ASH), formerly known until 1925 as the Texas State Lunatic Asylum, is a 240-bed psychiatric hospital located in Austin, Texas, United States. It is the oldest psychiatric facility in the state of Texas, and the oldest continuously operating west of the Mississippi River. It is operated by the Texas Health and Human Services Commission.

== History ==
=== Establishment and early years ===
The Texas State Lunatic Asylum was chartered by the Texas Legislature on August 28, 1856. The Act set aside $50,000 in U.S. bonds for the construction of a suitable building. The Governor was authorized to appoint a commission of three men to select a site of between 50 and 100 acres for the asylum, and to appoint a physician to serve as Superintendent at a salary of $2,000 per year and $10,000 in U.S. bonds was set aside for operations of the facility. Gov. Elisha M. Pease appointed Dr. J. C. Perry as the first Superintendent on May 27, 1857. He was replaced by Dr. C. G. Keenan on February 13, 1858.

Sam Houston was elected governor in 1859 and appointed Dr. Beriah Graham as Superintendent on January 9, 1860. It was during Dr. Graham's tenure that the Main Building was completed and opened for patients on March 11, 1861. Five days later, Gov. Houston resigned, and his successor, Gov. Edward Clark, re-appointed Dr. Keenan. Dr. Keenan served for about seven months until a new governor was elected later that year.

Gov. Francis Lubbock appointed Dr. J. M. Steiner as Superintendent on November 1, 1861.

=== 1900s ===
At the beginning of the 20th century, patients began to work on nearby farms during harvest season as part of their daily tasks to establish a sense of routine and serve as free labor for local farmers.

In 1925, the name of the facility changed from the Texas State Lunatic Asylum to the Austin State Hospital to reflect developing attitudes surrounding mental health care at the time.

By the 1950s, the hospital had made several recreational activities available to their patients. Residents played sports and were able to attend movie nights, dances, and religious services.

Between 1958 and 1965, the hospital gradually desegregated all of their admissions process and services by gender and race.

The daily average population of patients peaked in 1968 at approximately 3,313. By 1990, the daily average had dropped to 518 patients.

In 1993, operation of the hospital was transferred to the Texas Department of Mental Health and Mental Retardation.

=== Building renovations ===
Since 2015, the Texas Health and Human Services Commission and Dell Medical School at The University of Texas at Austin have been collaborating to improve conditions at the Austin State Hospital by organizing committees of regional stakeholders and working to focus operational budgets to secure the highest and most personal levels of care.

As a response to this influence and to an increasing demand for comprehensive mental health services due to complications caused by the COVID-19 pandemic, the Texas Legislature approved $745 million for the renovation and improvement of Texas psychiatric facilities in the 85th and 86th Legislative sessions. The Old Main Building, a portion of the original institution, remains intact as a Texas Historic Landmark.

As of March 2022, the newly renovated facility covers 375,000 square feet and contains 240 private patient bedrooms.

== Services ==
Austin State hospital offers psychiatric services for children, adolescents, and adults. These individuals may be struggling with one or more challenges within a broad range of mental illnesses and developmental or intellectual disabilities. This hospital offers acute, short-term care in the form of crisis stabilization with the goal of reintegration into society and the transition to long-term outpatient care.

== Gallery ==
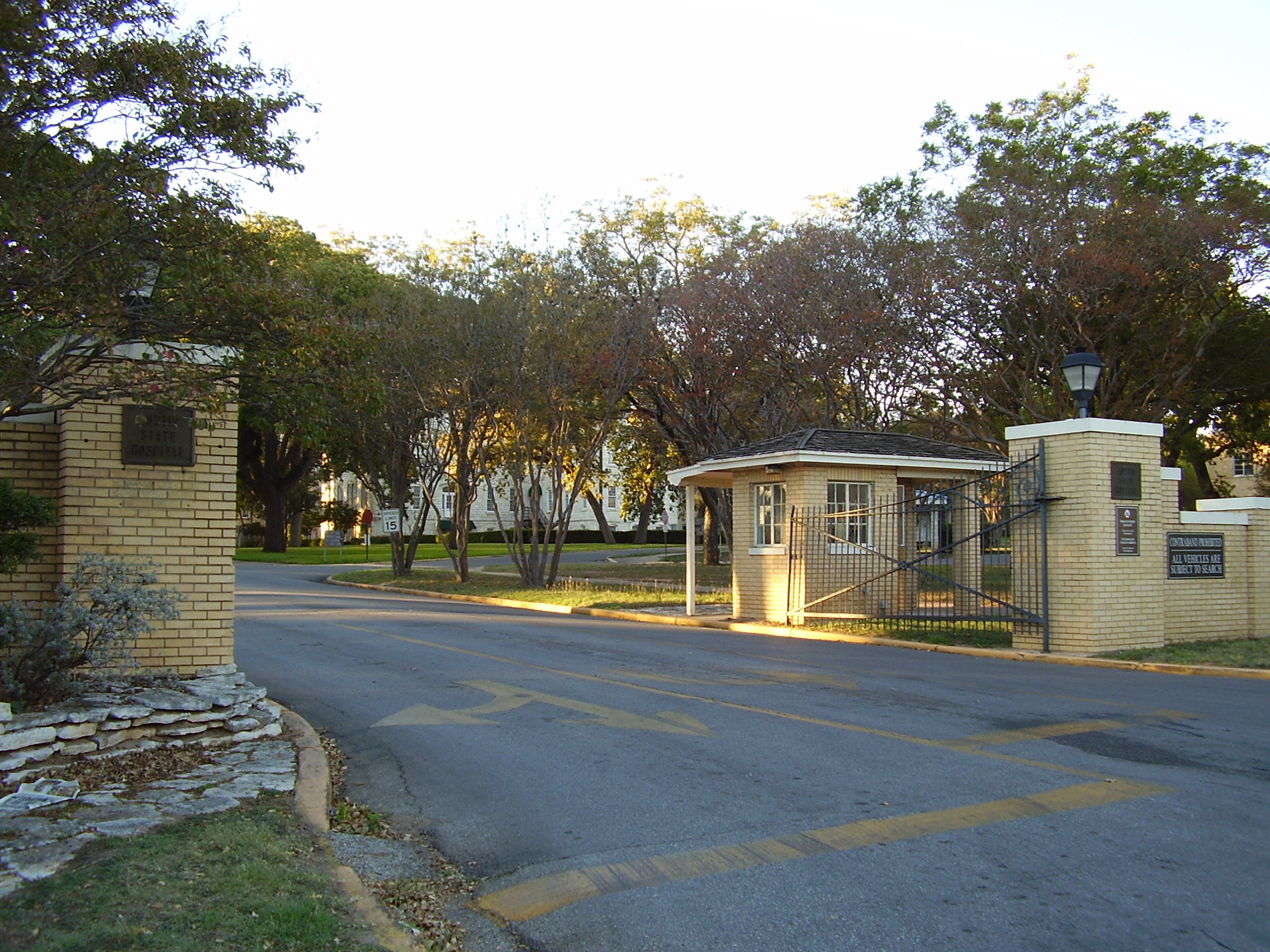
Entrance to the Austin State Hospital, at 4110 Guadalupe Street

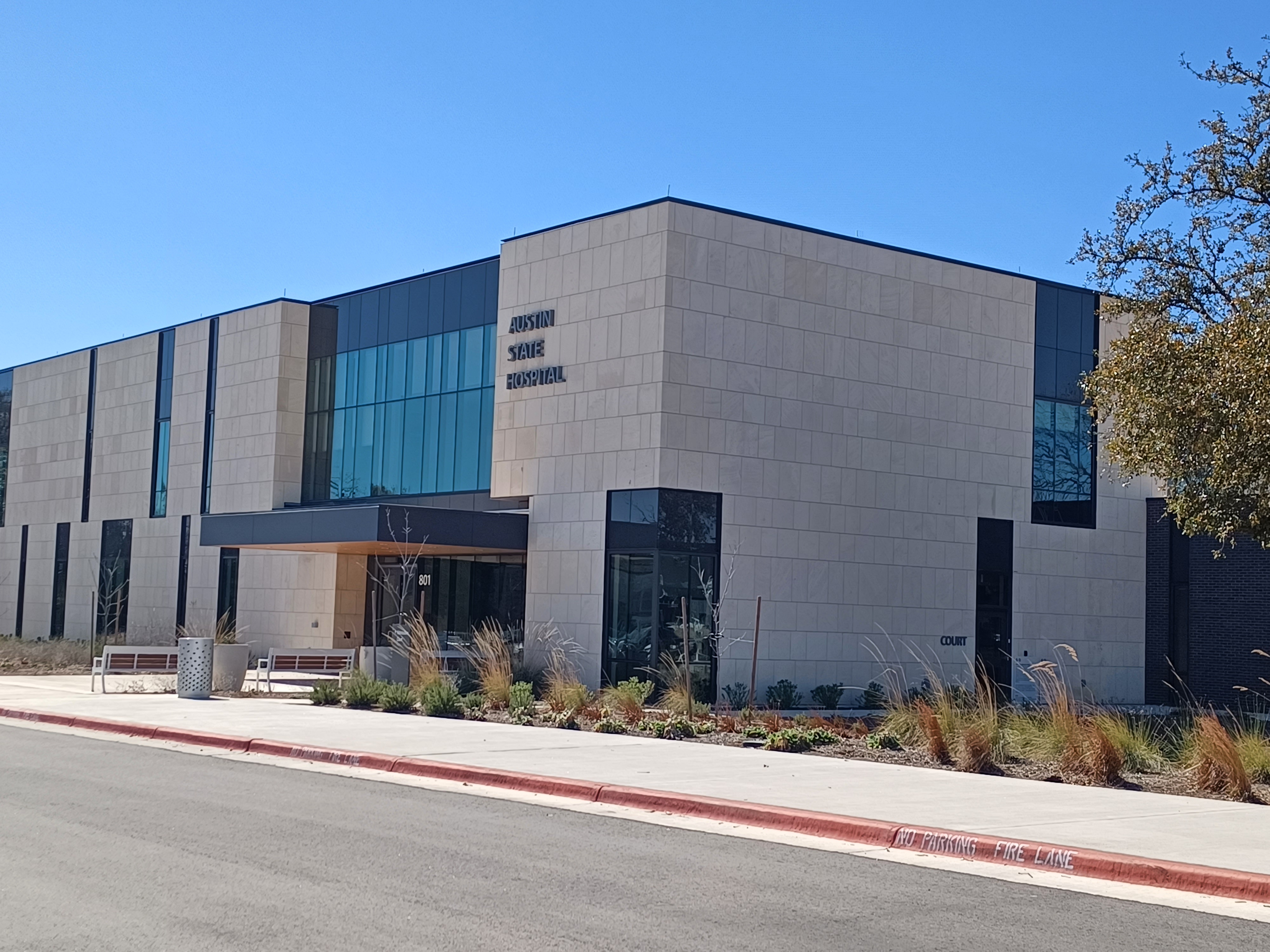
Front entrance of the new Austin State Hospital building 801, completed in 2024

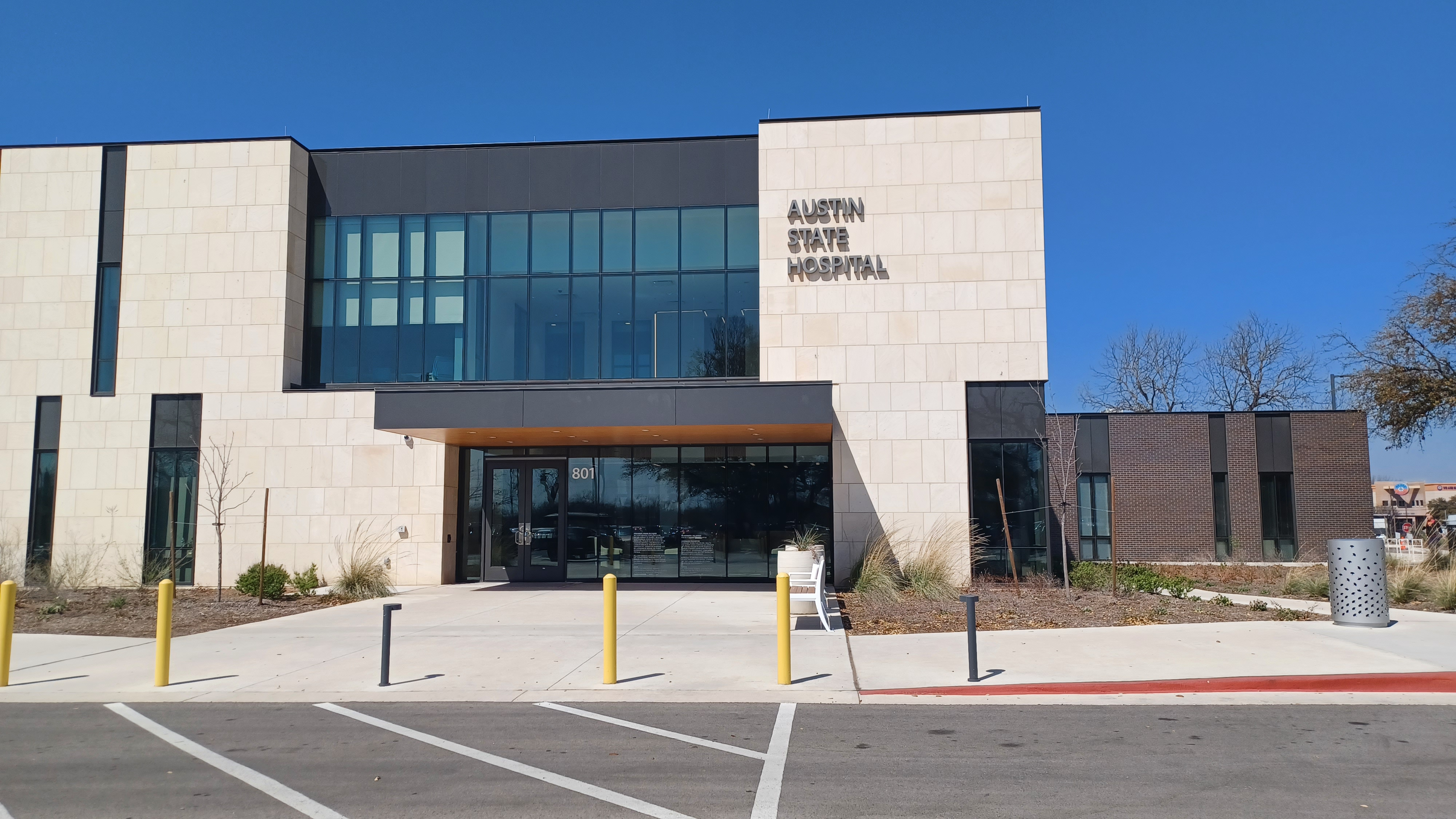
Another view of the front entrance of 801

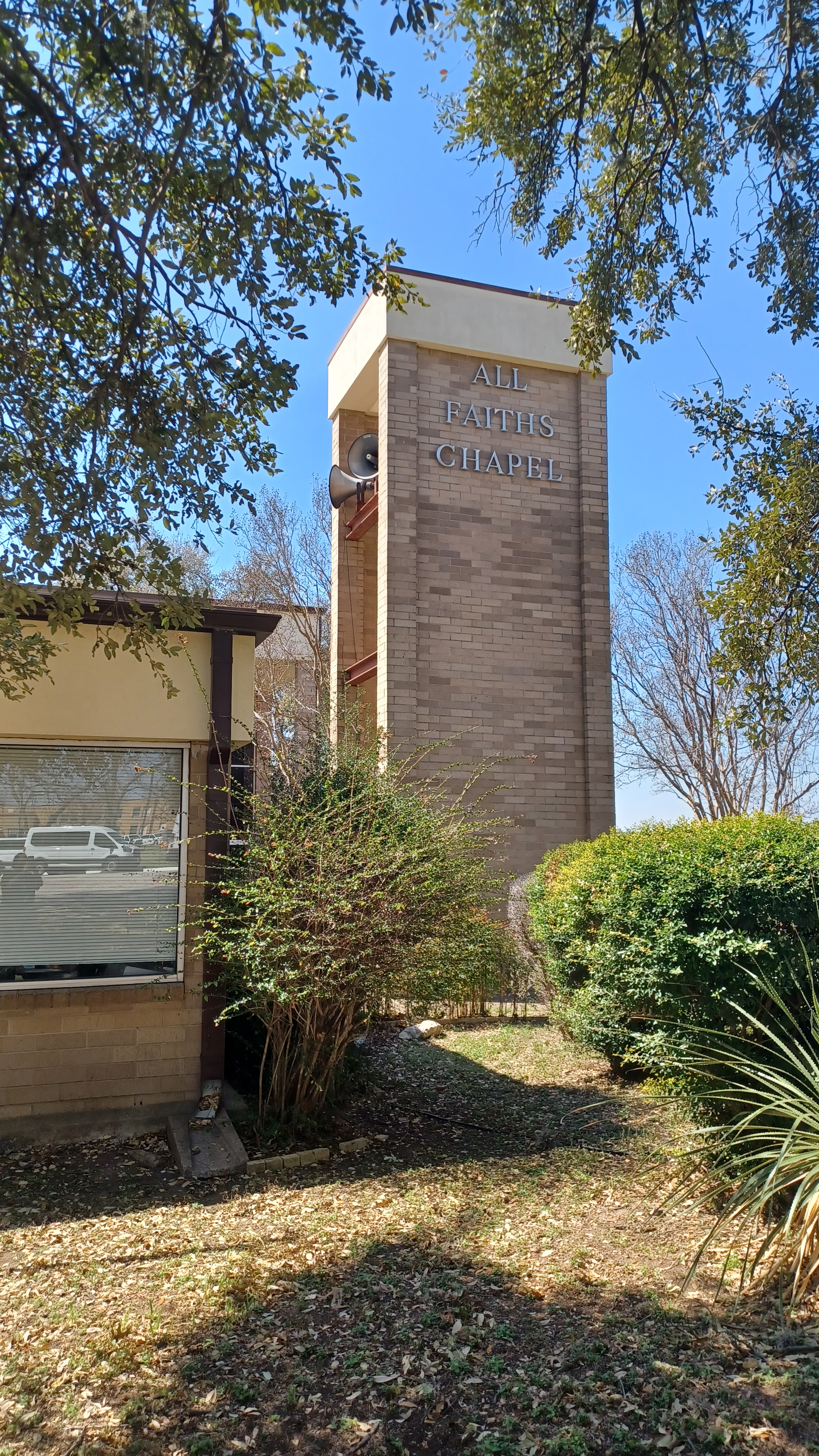
The bell tower of the All Faiths Chapel on the ASH campus.

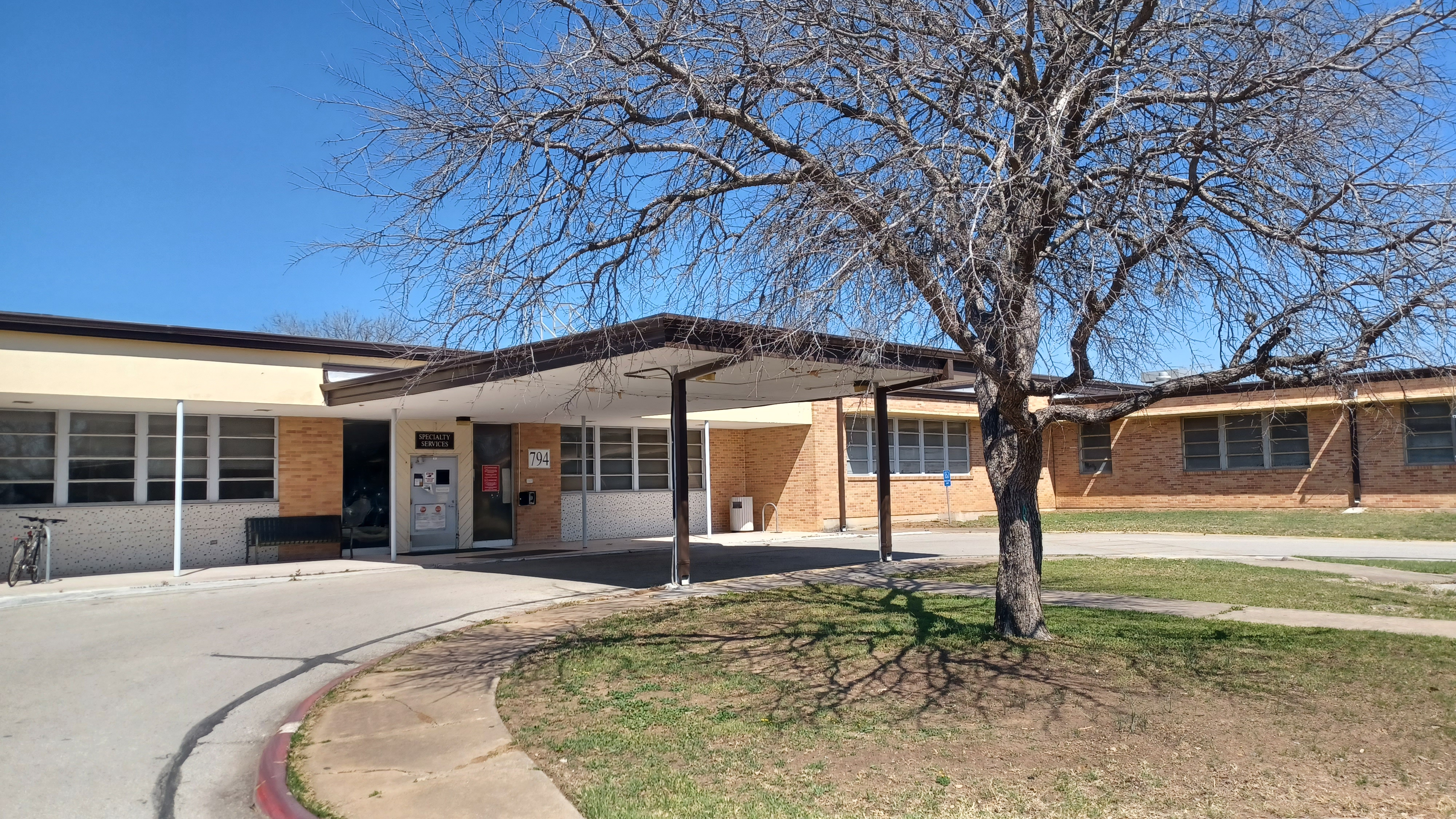
Entrance of building 794 (the Specialty Services unit), no longer in use.
