= CapMetro Rapid =

Bus rapid transit service in Austin, Texas

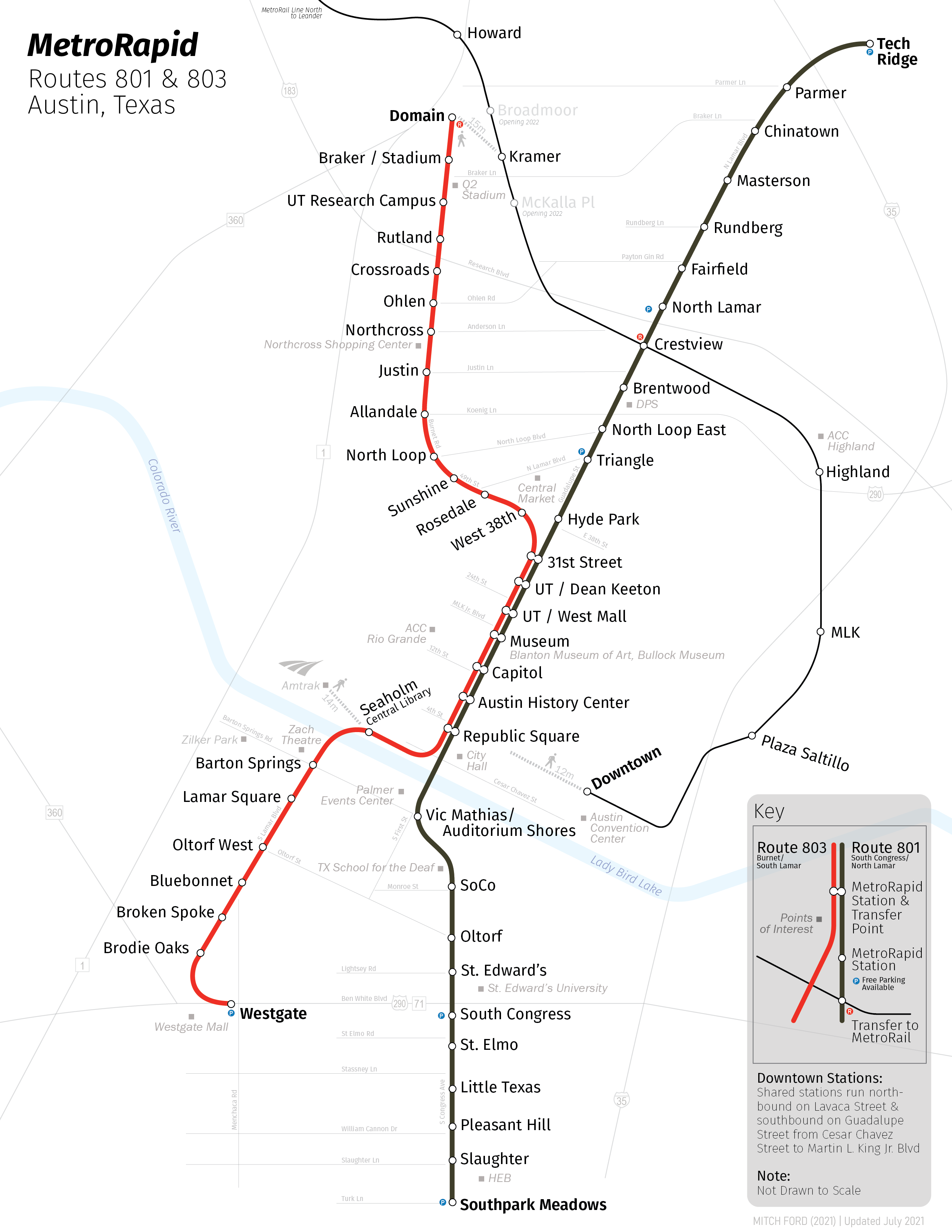
- CapMetro Rapid System Map as of January 2021

Overview
- Owner: Capital Metropolitan Transportation Authority
- Locale: Austin, Texas, U.S.
- Transit type: Bus rapid transit
- Number of lines: 4 (1 planned)
- Number of stations: 50
- Headquarters: Austin
- Website: http://www.capmetro.org/metrorapid

Operation
- Began operation: January 26, 2014

CapMetro Rapid is a bus rapid transit service in Austin, Texas, owned and operated by the Capital Metropolitan Transportation Authority (CapMetro). It consists of four routes in the system, which includes two original routes which run north-south served by stations designed by McKinney York Architects, and two more routes that went into operation as of March 2025.

== History ==
The original Route 1 North Lamar/South Congress bus line – merged from the paired Route 1 North Lamar and Route 13 South Congress lines in 2001 – was the busiest line in the CapMetro system, with peak frequencies of 10 minutes headways Monday through Friday, with wider headways on the weekends. The 101 express line supplemented local service on the 1 line. In 2006, Route 1 was split in two as 1L (serving North Lamar north of Rutland) and 1M (serving Metric), while maintaining high frequencies on the 1L/1M trunk line portion.

CapMetro (then branded as Capital Metro) debuted the first MetroRapid service, North Lamar/South Congress (Route 801) on January 26, 2014. It replaced existing CapMetro Bus Routes 1L/1M and the 101 Express, which traveled along the same corridor. (1M was renamed Route 1 Metric/South Congress, while a local version of the northernmost portion of former route 1L was created as Route 275. The Metric corridor is now served by 325.) Route 801 serves 29 stations between Tech Ridge in North Austin and Southpark Meadows via the University of Texas and Downtown Austin. It supplements local service on Route 1, which now has wider headways, resulting in overcrowded buses.

A second route, MetroRapid Burnet/South Lamar (Route 803), serves a total of 28 stations between The Domain and Westgate. It began operation during August 2014, supplementing service along Route 3 Burnet/Manchaca, which remains in service but now at a slightly reduced frequency.

CapMetro expanded MetroRapid started service on February 23, 2025 with two more routes: The Pleasant Valley Line (Route 800) and the Expo Center Line (Route 837). Route 800 runs from Barbara Jordan to Goodnight Ranch Park & Ride primarily along Pleasant Valley Road, supplementing Routes 7, 300 and 350 on portions of the route. Route 837 runs from Republic Square to Travis County Expo Center primarily along Manor Road and supplementing Routes 20 and 337 on most of the route.

== Operation and Headways ==
CapMetro Rapid operates from 5 a.m. to 11:30 p.m. Monday through Friday, and Saturdays and Sundays from 6 a.m. to 11:30 p.m. On Saturdays, it operates from 6 a.m. to 2:30 a.m., and Sundays from 7 a.m. to 11:30 a.m. All routes operate at a high frequency of 10 minutes during the day and 15 minutes at night Monday through Friday, and every 15-20 minutes on the weekends.

== List of CapMetro Rapid stations ==
Shared MetroRapid station
Transit hub/center and/or park and ride
Bolded CapMetro Bus route number (i.e. **7**) indicates high-frequency service

=== Route 800 - Pleasant Valley ===
north to south

Stop	Intersection/ address	Connections	Notes
Barbara Jordan	Berkman Drive and Barbara Jordan Boulevard	MetroBus **10**, **300**, 335, **837**; Pickup Northeast ATX	northern terminus Serves Dell Children's Medical Center
Simond	Berkman and Simond Avenue	MetroBus 335, 485, **837**	
Mueller Tower	Berkman and Tom Miller Street	MetroBus 335, 485, **837**	Located near the preserved former control tower of the now-defunct Mueller Airport.
Airport Boulevard	Airport Boulevard and Manor Road	MetroBus 135, 320, 350, 485, **837***	Northbound stop on Manor, southbound stop on Airport. *Southbound transfer stop within walking distance of Manor Westbound stop (served by 837).
Oak Springs	Airport and Oak Springs Drive	MetroBus **2**, 135, 350, 485; Pickup East ATX	Northbound stop on Airport, southbound stop on Oak Springs
ACC Eastview	Webberville Road and Govalle Avenue	MetroBus **300**; Pickup East ATX	Serves Austin Community College Eastview Campus and Eastside Early College High School.
7th Street	North Pleasant Valley Road and East Seventh Street	MetroBus **4**, 135, **300**; UT Shuttle 672 (LS); Pickup East ATX	Serves CapMetro Headquarters
Cesar Chavez	North Pleasant Valley and East Cesar Chavez Street	MetroBus **2**, **4**, **300**, 490, 491; UT Shuttle 672 (LS)	
Roy E. Guererro	South Pleasant Valley and Lakeshore Boulevard	MetroBus **300**; UT Shuttle 672 (LS)	Serves Roy E. Guererro Colorado River Park and Krieg Field
Elmont	South Pleasant Valley and Elmont Drive	MetroBus **300**; UT Shuttle 672 (LS)	
Riverside	South Pleasant Valley and East Riverside Drive	MetroBus **20**, 228, **300**, 483; UT Shuttle 671 (NR), 672 (LS)	
Sheringham	South Pleasant Valley and Sheringham Drive	MetroBus 228, **300**, 483	
Oltorf East	South Pleasant Valley and East Oltorf Street	MetroBus 228, **300**, 310, 483	Northsound stop on Pleasant Valley, southbound stop on Oltorf
Oltorf at Burton	East Oltorf and Burton Drive	MetroBus 228, **300**, 310, 483	
Iroquois	Burleson Road and Iroquois Lane		
Mission Hill	Burleson and Mission Hill Drive		
Franklin Park	South Pleasant Valley and Franklin Park Drive	Pickup Dove Springs	
Dove Springs	South Pleasant Valley and East Stassney Lane	MetroBus **7**, **311**, 486; Pickup Dove Springs	
Village Square	South Pleasant Valley and Village Square Drive	MetroBus **7**, 486; Pickup Dove Springs	Serves Mendez Middle School
Onion Creek	South Pleasant Valley and East William Cannon Drive	MetroBus **7**, **333**; Pickup Dove Springs	
Easton Park	McKinney Falls Parkway and East William Cannon Drive		
Goodnight Ranch	2401 East Slaughter Lane	MetroBus 318, **333**	southern terminus

=== Route 801 - North Lamar/South Congress ===
north to south

Stop	Intersection/ address	Connections	Notes
Tech Ridge	900 Center Ridge Drive	MetroBus 1, 135, 152, 243, **325**, 392, 935; Pickup Dessau; CARTS	northern terminus Serves Tech Ridge Retail Center. Park and Ride
Parmer	North Lamar Boulevard and Indian Mound Drive (northbound); North Lamar Boulevard just north of Parmer Lane	Pickup Walnut Creek	
Braker Southbound	North Lamar Boulevard and West Braker Lane	MetroBus 1, 392; Pickup Walnut Creek	Southbound only stop
Chinatown	North Lamar Boulevard and Kramer Lane	MetroBus 1	
Masterson	North Lamar and Masterson Pass	MetroBus 1	
Rundberg	North Lamar and West Rundberg Lane	MetroBus 1, 324, **325**, 481	Serves Rundberg/Lamar Shopping Center
Fairfield	North Lamar and West Elliott Street (northbound); North Lamar and Fairfield Drive (southbound)	MetroBus 1, 481	
North Lamar Transit Center	7911 Research Boulevard	MetroBus 1, 323, 350, 383, 481	MetroRapid stop is located on the North Lamar southbound service road north of U.S. 183 intersection, within walking distance of transit center; both northbound and southbound buses stop there.
Crestview	6920 North Lamar Boulevard	CapMetro Rail Red Line at Crestview station MetroBus 1, **7**, **300**, 350, 481	MetroRapid stop is located on North Lamar at Airport Boulevard (southbound) or Justin Lane (northbound)
Brentwood	North Lamar and West Koenig Lane	MetroBus 1, **337**, 481	Serves Texas Department of Public Safety office
North Loop East	North Lamar and North Loop Boulevards	MetroBus 1, 481, 990	
Triangle	4600 Guadalupe Street West	MetroBus 1, 481, 990; UT Shuttle 656 (IF), 681 (IF/FW)	MetroRapid stop is located on West Guadalupe at West Forty-seventh Streets; Serves Texas Department of Health and Texas School for the Blind. Park and Ride
Hyde Park	Guadalupe at West Thirty-ninth Streets (northbound); Guadalupe at West Thirty-eight-and-a-half Streets (southbound)	MetroBus 1, 335, 481, 990	Serves Austin State Hospital
31st Street	Guadalupe and West Thirty-first Streets	MetroBus 1, 3, 30, 481, **803**	
UT/Dean Keeton	Guadalupe and West Dean Keeton Streets (northbound); Guadalupe and West Twenty-sixth Streets (southbound)	MetroBus 1, 3, **20**, 30, 105, 410, 481, **803**, 982, 987, 990; UT Shuttle 640 (FA), 642 (WC), 661 (FW)	Serves University of Texas at Austin
UT/West Mall	Guadalupe and West Mall walkway (northbound); Guadalupe and West Twenty-third Streets (southbound)	MetroBus 1, 3, **20**, 30, 105, 410, 481, **803**, 980, 981, 982, 987, 990; UT Shuttle 640 (FA), 642 (WC)	Serves University of Texas at Austin, The Drag
Museum	Lavaca and West Seventeenth Streets (northbound); Guadalupe and Seventeenth (southbound)	MetroBus 1, 3, 18, **20**, 30, 105, 481, **803**, 980, 981, 982, 985, 987, 990; UT Shuttle 663 (LA)	Serves Blanton Museum of Art and Bullock Texas State History Museum
Capitol	Lavaca and West Thirteenth Streets (northbound); Guadalupe and West Twelfth Streets (southbound)	MetroBus 1, 3, **20**, 30, 103, 481, **803**, 980, 981, 982, 985, 987, 990; UT Shuttle 663 (LA)	Serves Downtown Austin, the Texas State Capitol complex, ACC Rio Grande campus, Travis County Courthouse
Austin History Center	Lavaca and West Eighth Streets (northbound); Guadalupe and Eighth (southbound)	MetroBus 1, **2**, 3, **4**, 5, **7**, **10**, **20**, 30, 103, 105, 111, 142, 171, 481, 485, **803**, 935, 980, 981, 982, 985, 987, 990; UT Shuttle 663 (LA)	Originally called "Wooldridge Square"; Serves Downtown, Austin History Center, CapMetro Transit Store, Congress Avenue Historic District (walking distance) and Sixth Street.
Republic Square	Lavaca and West Third Streets (northbound); Guadalupe and West Fourth Streets (southbound)	MetroBus 1, **2**, 3, **4**, 5, **7**, **10**, **20**, 30, 105, 111, 142, 171, 483, 484, 486, **803**, **837**, 935, 980, 981, 982, 985, 987, 990	Serves Downtown, City Hall, Lady Bird Lake (Colorado River) and Republic Square. Within walking distance of Austin Convention Center and Downtown CapMetro Rail station.
Vic Mathias/Auditorium Shores	West Riverside Drive and Barton Springs Road	MetroBus 1, **7**, **10**, **20**, 142, 483, 486, 935, 987	Originally called "Auditorium Shores"; Serves Auditorium Shores, Long Center, Palmer Events Center, Bat colony
SoCo	South Congress Avenue and East Elizabeth Street (northbound); South Congress Avenue and West Monroe Street (southbound)	MetroBus 1, 486	Serves SoCo, Texas School for the Deaf
Oltorf	South Congress Avenue and East/West Oltorf Street	MetroBus 1, **300**, 486	
St. Edward's	South Congress Avenue and Woodward Street (northbound); South Congress Avenue and Lightsey Road (southbound)	MetroBus 1, 486	Serves St. Edward's University
South Congress Transit Center	301 West Ben White Boulevard	MetroBus 1, 310, 315	
St. Elmo	South Congress Avenue and St. Elmo Road	MetroBus 1, 486	
Little Texas	South Congress Avenue and Little Texas Lane	MetroBus 1, **311**, 486	
Pleasant Hill	South Congress Avenue at William Cannon Drive	MetroBus 1, 201, **333**, 486	
Slaughter	South Congress Avenue at Slaughter Lane	MetroBus 201	
Southpark Meadows	Turk and Cullen Lanes	MetroBus 3, **10**, 201, 318	southern terminus Serves Southpark Meadows Shopping Center

=== Route 803 - Burnet/South Lamar ===
north to south

Stop	Intersection/ address	Connections	Notes
Domain	Alterra Parkway and Esperanza Crossing	MetroBus 466	northern terminus Serves The Domain shopping center
Braker/Stadium	Burnet Road and Braker Lane	MetroBus 3, 383, 392	Serves Q2 Stadium
UT Research Campus	Road A at James Hart Trail (northbound); Road A at Clyde Davis Trail	MetroBus 466	Serves J. J. Pickle Research Campus
Rutland	Burnet Road and Longhorn Road (northbound); Burnet Road and Rutland Drive (southbound)	MetroBus 3, 383,	
Crossroads	Burnet Road and Polaris Avenue (northbound); Burnet Road and Research Boulevard (southbound)	MetroBus 3, 383	
Ohlen	Burnet and Ohlen Roads (northbound); Burnet Road and Penny Lane (southbound)	MetroBus 3, 324	
Northcross	Burnet Road and St. Joseph Boulevard (northbound); Burnet Road and West Anderson Lane (southbound)	MetroBus 3, 5, 30, 323, 324	Serves Northcross Shopping Center
Justin	Burnet Road and Justin Lane (northbound); Burnet Road and Pegram Avenue	MetroBus 3	
Allandale	Burnet Road and West Koenig Lane (northbound); Burnet Road and Allandale Road (southbound)	MetroBus 3, **337**, 491	
North Loop	Burnet Road and North Loop Boulevard	MetroBus 3, 345	
Sunshine	Sunshine Drive and North Lamar Boulevard	MetroBus 5, 345	
Rosedale	North Lamar and West Fortieth Street	MetroBus 5	Serves Central Market, Central Park Shopping Center, Heart Hospital of Austin, Seton Medical Center
West 38th	West Thirty-eighth Street and West Avenue	MetroBus 3, 30, **335**, 491, 982, 987	
31st Street	Guadalupe and West Thirty-first Streets	MetroBus 1, 3, 30, 481, **801**	
UT/Dean Keeton	Guadalupe and West Dean Keeton Streets (northbound); Guadalupe and West Twenty-sixth Streets (southbound)	MetroBus 1, 3, **20**, 30, 105, 410, 481, **801**, 982, 987, 990; UT Shuttle 640 (FA), 642 (WC), 661 (FW)	Serves University of Texas at Austin
UT/West Mall	Guadalupe and West Mall walkway (northbound); Guadalupe and West Twenty-third Streets (southbound)	MetroBus 1, 3, **20**, 30, 105, 410, 481, **801**, 980, 981, 982, 987, 990; UT Shuttle 640 (FA), 642 (WC)	Serves University of Texas at Austin, The Drag
Museum	Lavaca and West Seventeenth Streets (northbound); Guadalupe and Seventeenth (southbound)	MetroBus 1, 3, **18**, **20**, 30, 105, 481, **801**, 980, 981, 982, 985, 987, 990; UT Shuttle 663 (LA)	Serves Blanton Museum of Art and Bullock Texas State History Museum
Capitol	Lavaca and West Thirteenth Streets (northbound); Guadalupe and West Twelfth Streets (southbound)	MetroBus 1, 3, **20**, 30, 103, 481, **801**, 980, 981, 982, 985, 987, 990; UT Shuttle 663 (LA)	Serves Downtown Austin, Texas State Capitol complex, ACC Rio Grande campus, Travis County courthouse
Austin History Center	Lavaca and West Eighth Streets (northbound); Guadalupe and Eighth (southbound)	MetroBus 1, **2**, 3, **4**, 5, **7**, **10**, **20**, 30, 103, 105, 111, 142, 171, 481, 485, **801**, 935, 980, 981, 982, 985, 987, 990; UT Shuttle 663 (LA)	Originally called "Wooldridge Square"; Serves Downtown, Austin History Center, CapMetro Transit Center, Congress Avenue Historic District (walking distance) and Sixth Street.
Republic Square	Lavaca and West Third Streets (northbound); Guadalupe and West Fourth Streets (southbound)	MetroBus 1, **2**, 3, **4**, 5, **7**, **10**, **20**, 30, 105, 111, 142, 171, 483, 484, 486, **801**, **837**, 935, 980, 981, 982, 985, 987, 990	Serves Downtown, City Hall, Lady Bird Lake (Colorado River) and Republic Square. Within walking distance of Austin Convention Center and Downtown MetroRail station.
Seaholm/Central Library	West Cesar Chavez and San Antonio Streets (northbound); West Cesar Chavez and West Streets (southbound)*	MetroBus 3, 111, 171, 980, 981, 985	Originally "Seaholm" *southbound temporary stop due to construction Serves Lady Bird Lake and the Central Library. Within walking distance of Amtrak station
Barton Springs	South Lamar Boulevard and Butler Road (northbound); South Lamar Boulevard and Barton Springs Road (southbound)	MetroBus 3, 30, 484	Serves Auditorium Shores, Barton Springs, Long Center, Palmer Events Center, Zach Theatre and Zilker Park
Lamar Square	South Lamar and Lamar Square Drive	MetroBus 3, 484	
Oltorf West	South Lamar and West Oltorf Street (northbound); South Lamar and Oxford Avenue (southbound)	MetroBus 3, **300**, 484	
Bluebonnet	South Lamar and Bluebonnet Lane	MetroBus 3, **300**, 484	
Broken Spoke	South Lamar and West Ben White Boulevards (northbound); South Lamar and Brodie Oaks	MetroBus **300**	
Brodie Oaks	South Lamar and West Ben White Boulevards (northbound); South Lamar and Brodie Oaks		
Westgate Transit Center	2027 West Ben White Boulevard	MetroBus 30, 105, **300**, **311**, 315, 318	southern terminus Replaces original "Westgate" stop on Western Trails Boulevard near Westgate Mall

=== Route 837 - Expo Center ===
north to south

Stop	Intersection/ address	Connections	Notes
Expo Center	7001 Decker Lane	MetroBus 18, 233, **337**; Pickup Decker	northern terminus Serves Travis County Expo Center and Walter E. Long Park
Colony Park	Loyola Lane and Colony Loop	MetroBus 18, 233, **337**; Pickup Decker	
Johnny Morris	Loyola Lane and Johnny Norris Road	MetroBus 18, 233, **337**; Pickup Decker	
Purple Sage	Crystalbrook and Purple Sage Drives	Pickup Decker	
LBJ High School	Pecan Brook and Tumbleweed Drives	MetroBus 320; Pickup Decker	Serves Lyndon B. Johnson High School
Delco Center	Pecan Brook Drive east of Manor Road	MetroBus 320; Pickup Decker	Serves Delco Activity Center; Park and ride lot
Springdale Center	Manor Road and Susquehanna Lane	MetroBus 320, 339; Pickup Decker and Northeast ATX	
University Hills	Manor Road and Northeast Drive	MetroBus 320; Pickup Northeast ATX	
Manor at Rogge	Manor Road and Rogge Lane	MetroBus 320; Pickup Northeast ATX	
51st/Manor	Manor Road and East Fifty-first Street	MetroBus **300**, 320; Pickup Northeast ATX	
Barbara Jordan	Berkman Drive and Barbara Jordan Boulevard	MetroBus **10**, 335, **300**, 485, **800**; Pickup Northeast ATX	Serves Dell Children's Medical Center
Simond	Berkman and Simond Avenue	MetroBus 335, 485, **800**	
Mueller Tower	Berkman and Tom Miller Street	MetroBus 335, 485, **800**	Located near the preserved former control tower of the now-defunct Mueller Airport.
Airport Boulevard	Airport Boulevard and Manor Road	MetroBus 135, 320, 350, 485, **800***	Northbound only stop on Manor; served both by 800 and 837.
Manor Westbound	Manor Road west of Airport Boulevard	MetroBus 135, 320, 350, 485, **800***	Southbound stop only *Walking distance of southbound platform on Airport served by 800.
Alexander	Manor Road and Alexander Avenue	MetroBus 320	
Cherrywood	Manor Road and Chestnut Avenue (northbound); Manor and Cherrywood Roads (southbound)	MetroBus 320, 322	
East Dean Keeton	East Dean Keeton Street and Robert Dedman Drive/Medical Arts Street (northbound); East Dean Keeton Street and Hampton Road (southbound)	MetroBus **10**, **20**, 171, 320	Serves St. David's Hospital
UT Stadium	San Jacinto Boulevard and East Twenty-third Street	MetroBus **7**, **10**, 103, 111, 171, 465, 985; UT Shuttle 640 (FA), 642 (WC), 670 (NR), 672 (LS)	Serves Serves University of Texas at Austin with Darrell K Royal–Texas Memorial Stadium on campus.
Medical Center	Trinity and East Seventeenth Streets (northbound); San Jacinto and East Seventeenth (southbound)	MetroBus **7**, **10**, 18, 103, 111, 142, 171, 935, 985	Serves Dell Seton Medical Center
Capitol/Waterloo Park	Trinity and East Twelfth Streets (northbound); San Jacinto and East Tenth Street (southbound)	MetroBus **2**, 5, **7**, **10**, 103, 111, 142, 171, 935	Serves Downtown Austin, the Texas State Capitol complex and Waterloo Park.
8th Street	Trinity and East Eighth (northbound); San Jacinto and East Eighth (southbound)	MetroBus **2**, **4**, 5, **7**, **10**, 103, 111, 142, 171, 935	Serves Downtown, Congress Avenue Historic District (walking distance) and Sixth Street.
Brush Square	Trinity and East Fourth (northbound); San Jacinto and East Fourth (southbound)	CapMetro Rail Red Line at Downtown Station	Serves Austin Convention Center.
Republic Square	West Fifth and Guadalupe Streets	MetroBus 1, **2**, 3, **4**, 5, **7**, **10**, **20**, 30, 105, 111, 142, 171, 483, 484, 486, **801**, **803**, 935, 980, 981, 982, 985, 987, 990	southern terminus Serves Downtown, City Hall, Lady Bird Lake (Colorado River) and Republic Square.

== New stops ==
The 801 and 803 started to stop at 31st and Guadalupe during the summer of 2018. The usual MetroRapid red shelters (with displays showing how soon the next buses will arrive) were not installed until October.

Broken Spoke on route 803 and St. Elmo and Fairfield on route 801 were first shown as working stops on the maps issued in advance of the August 19th, 2018 CapMetro service changes. Rutland on route 803 and Parmer, North Loop East, and Slaughter on route 801 were first shown as working stops on the maps issued in advance of the January 6th, 2019 CapMetro service changes. However, Slaughter did not actually open until late 2019.

The southern terminus of route 803 was first shown as shifted to the newly-established Westgate Transit Center (with attached park-and-ride parking lot) on the maps issued in advance of the June 2, 2019 CapMetro service changes.

In addition to the new stations, CapMetro has started installing new departure boards at many MetroRapid stations. These boards are made by Luminator Technology Group and use electronic ink to show the departures of the next several busses. The new boards have many advantages over the dot matrix boards that were installed with the original stations, such as showing departures for not only MetroRapid busses, but also local MetroBus routes that also serve that station. The dot matrix boards at the stations where the new E-ink boards were installed were turned off and are no longer used.

== Future plans ==
=== Gold Line ===
The Gold Line is a planned 9.5-mile (15.3 km) bus rapid transit line that would operate from ACC Highland to the South Congress Transit Center park-and-ride, and will travel on Airport, Red River, San Jacinto/Trinity, 7th/8th, Neches/Red River, 4th, Riverside, and South Congress. Stations will be ACC Highland, Clarkson, Hancock, St. David's, UT East, Medical School, Capitol East, Trinity, Downtown Station (where transfer to the Red, Green, or Blue Lines will be possible), Republic Square, Auditorium Shores, SoCo (South Congress), Oltorf, St. Edward's, and South Congress Transit Center. The Gold Line was changed to light rail in May 2020, citing a demographic that showed an increased projected ridership along the gold line that prompted its conversion to light rail. In July 2020, planning for the line was reverted to bus service to lower construction costs in response to the economic crisis caused by the COVID-19 pandemic.

== Criticism ==
The premium fare structure recommended by a consultant caused problems for the agency. It did not collect as much money back from the fare increase as was originally expected. Other BRT systems in Texas such as San Antonio and El Paso intentionally priced their BRT system for local fare. The MetroRapid bus fare was lowered to regular bus prices on January 8, 2017
