= Plaza Saltillo station =

Hybrid rail station in Austin, Texas

Plaza Saltillo
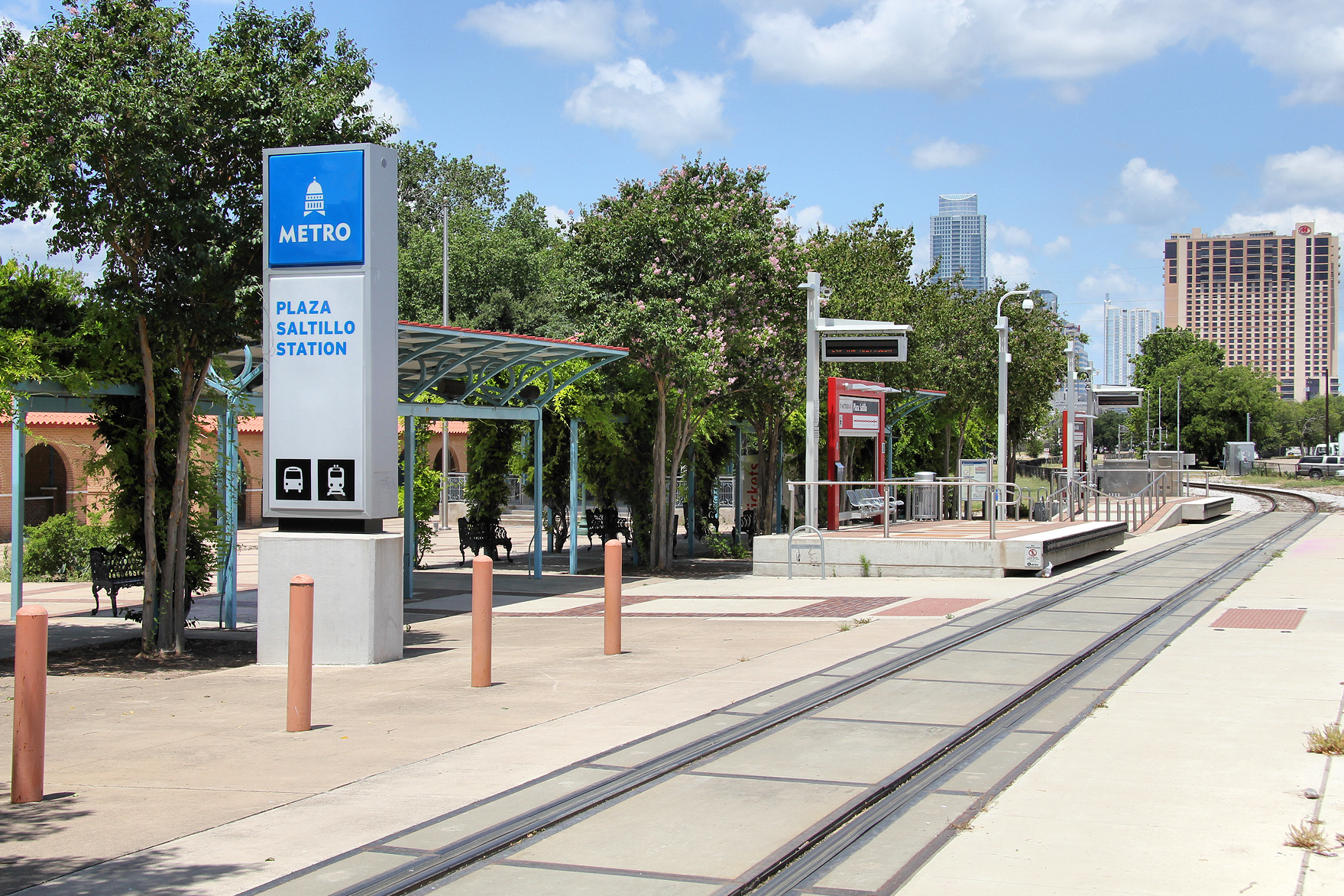

General information
- Location: 412 Comal Street; Austin, TX 78702
- Coordinates: 30.262187°N 97.727606°W
- Owner: CapMetro
- Platforms: 1 side platform
- Connections: CARTS; Greyhound Station

Construction
- Parking: Limited spaces; Street
- Cycle facilities: Yes (Bikeshare)
- Accessible: Yes

History
- Opened: March 22, 2010

Services
| Preceding station | CapMetro Rail | Following station |
|---|---|---|
| MLK Jr. toward Leander | Red Line | Downtown Terminus |
Future services
| Preceding station | CapMetro Rail | Following station |
|---|---|---|
| Pleasant Valley toward Colony Park | Green Line | Downtown Terminus |
Location

Plaza Saltillo station is a CapMetro Rail hybrid rail station in Austin, Texas. It is located in East Austin at the corner of Fifth and Comal Street adjacent to the Plaza Saltillo complex which, in turn, was built in 1998 as a result of a collaborative effort between the city of Austin, the city of Saltillo (a sister city of Austin), Capital Metro and Ole Mexico, an east Austin cultural group. To smoothly incorporate the station in the existing plaza layout and still ensure ADA accessibility, the platform was built with a unique "split ramp" layout, with two high-level sections split by a pair of wheelchair ramps. Railcars stop with their doors aligned with the high-level platform sections, providing level access. With Project Connect, the Green Line will also stop at this station.
