= MLK Jr. station (CapMetro Rail) =

Hybrid rail station in Austin, Texas

MLK Jr.
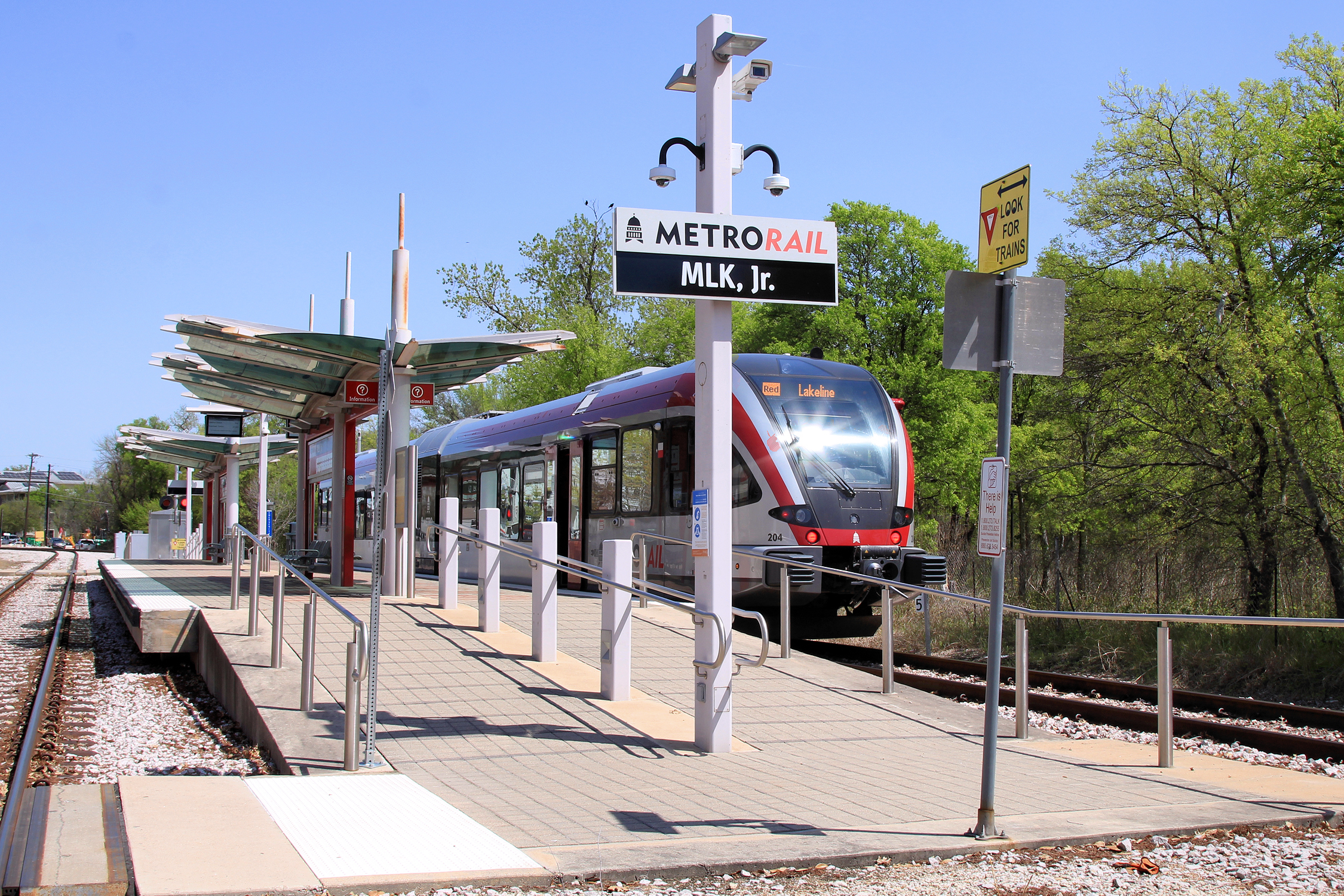

General information
- Location: 1719 Alexander Avenue; Austin, TX
- Coordinates: 30.27974°N 97.708913°W
- Owner: CapMetro
- Platforms: 1 island platform
- Connections: CapMetro Bus 18, 465

Construction
- Parking: Street
- Cycle facilities: Yes (CapMetro Bike)
- Accessible: Yes

History
- Opened: March 22, 2010

Services
Preceding station	CapMetro Rail	Following station
Highland toward Leander	Red Line	Plaza Saltillo toward Downtown
Location

MLK Jr. station is a CapMetro Rail hybrid rail station in Austin, Texas. It was built with a musical theme in mind and is located in East Austin at the corner of Martin Luther King Jr. Boulevard and Alexander Avenue.

== Transit connections ==
- #18 MLK Jr.
- #465 MLK Jr./University of Texas
