= North Lamar Transit Center =

Bus station in Austin, Texas, United States

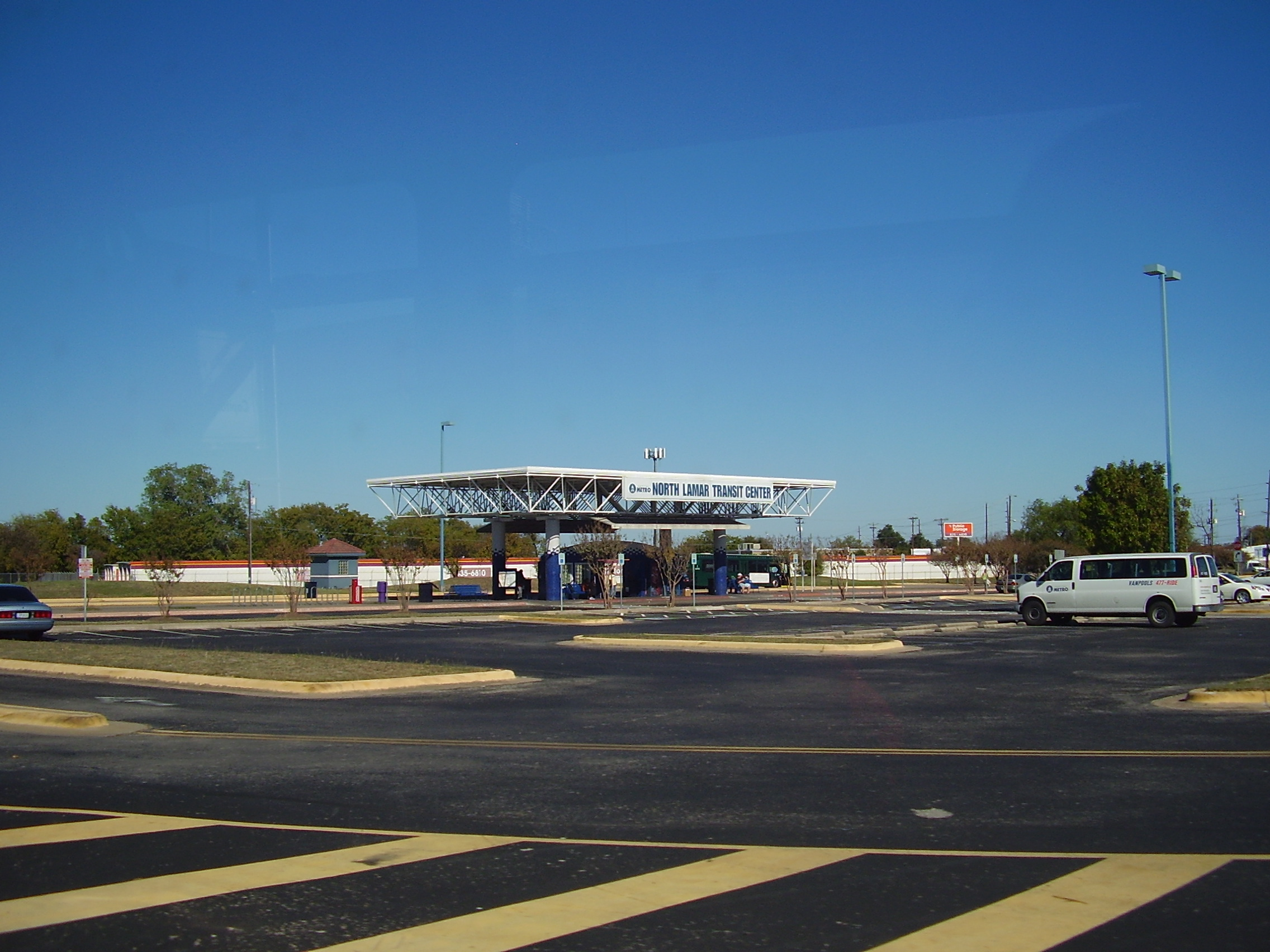
- The Transit Center seen in 2008

General information
- Location: 8001 US-183; Austin, Texas 78758
- Coordinates: 30.35°N 97.7122°W
- Owner: CapMetro
- Connections: CapMetro Bus 1, 323, 350, 383, 481; CapMetro Rapid 801

Construction
- Parking: 268 spaces
Location

North Lamar Transit Center is a Capital Metropolitan Transportation Authority bus station in Austin, Texas. It is located on North Lamar Boulevard on the north side of U.S. Route 183. The station features a park and ride lot and is served by several local bus routes as well as CapMetro Rapid Route 801. As part of Project Connect, a CapMetro Rail light rail station is planned to be built at the facility; it is planned to be the northern terminus of the system.
