= CapMetro Rail =

Hybrid rail service in Austin, Texas

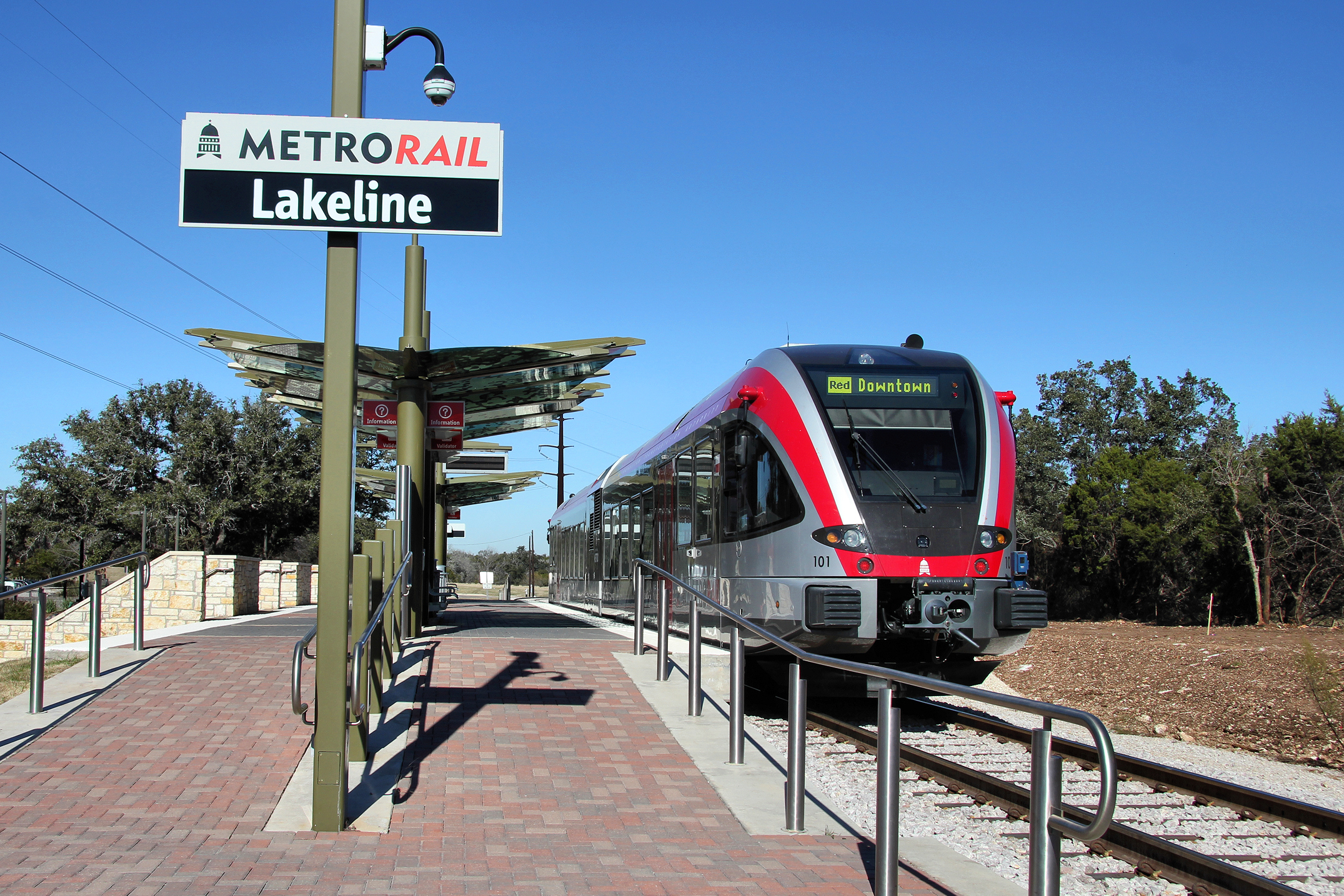
- CapMetro Rail train at Lakeline station

Overview
- Owner: Capital Metropolitan Transportation Authority
- Locale: Greater Austin, Texas, U.S.
- Transit type: Hybrid rail
- Line number: 1
- Number of stations: 10
- Daily ridership: 1,900 (weekdays, Q2 2026)
- Annual ridership: 620,600 (2025)
- Website: capmetro.org/metrorail

Operation
- Began operation: March 22, 2010
- Operator: Herzog Transit Services
- Number of vehicles: 10 Stadler GTW
- Headway: 30–40 minutes (peak), 60 minutes (off-peak)

Technical
- System length: 32 mi (51 km)
- Track gauge: 4 ft 8 1/2 in (1,435 mm) standard gauge
- Top speed: 60 mph (97 km/h)

CapMetro Rail is a hybrid rail service in the Greater Austin area in Texas and is owned by CapMetro, Austin's primary public transportation provider. The Red Line is CapMetro's first and currently only rail line, and connects Downtown Austin with Austin's northwestern suburbs. The line operates on 32 miles (51 km) of existing freight tracks, and serves 10 stations. After a series of delays, CapMetro Rail was inaugurated in March 2010. CapMetro added Friday evening and Saturday afternoon and evening regularly scheduled service on March 23, 2012. In 2025, the line had a ridership of 620,600, or about 1,900 per weekday as of the second quarter of 2026.

Several proposals to construct new tracks running through the densest areas of the city have been put forward over the years. Austin voters chose not to commit funds towards the construction of a light rail system in 2000 and 2014 but did do so in 2020. Since then, CapMetro has been planning new rail lines as part of the Project Connect plan. Construction of the Orange and Blue light rail lines would bring rail service to the western half of Downtown, the University of Texas at Austin, and the city's airport. The Green Line would operate similarly to the Red Line, operating on existing freight tracks between Austin, Manor, and Elgin.

== History ==
=== Early urban rail efforts ===
Advocates of modern urban rail began calling on the city of Austin to develop a passenger rail system at the height of the 1970s energy crisis. When voters approved CapMetro's creation in 1985, the agency was seen not only as the new operator of local bus services but as the developer of a future passenger rail as well. The next year, CapMetro partnered with the City of Austin to purchase the 162-mile (261 km) Giddings-to-Llano Austin and Northwestern Railroad (A&NW) from the Southern Pacific Transportation Company with the express purpose of someday operating passenger rail on it. The purchase price was $9.3 million, of which $6 million came from a grant from the Federal Transit Administration, $0.6 million came from the City of Austin and $2.7 million came from CapMetro. On May 20, 1998, CapMetro acquired the City of Austin's share in the railroad for $1 million.

During the 1990s, CapMetro faced persistent bad publicity that resulted from dysfunctional management and poor accountability. After years of inaction on passenger rail, the Texas Legislature in 1997 stepped in and ordered the public transport provider to hold a referendum on light rail. In response, CapMetro drew up an ambitious plan for a $1.9 billion, 52-mile (84 km) system to be funded by federal funds and local sales taxes. The 2000 proposal's 14-mile "starter segment" would have used the A&NW's right-of-way through Austin from a station at Howard Lane south to another at the Lamar / Airport intersection, then followed Lamar south to Guadalupe Street, and finally run along Guadalupe to serve the university and Downtown. Future phases would have extended passenger rail service along the entire A&NW right-of-way between Downtown and a Leander station, plus new tracks along South Congress Avenue and Riverside Drive.

The 2000 proposal was narrowly defeated by 2,000 votes, receiving support from 49.6% of voters; most of central Austin voted in favor whereas suburban and exurban areas within the service area voted against.

=== Red Line and Downtown station ===
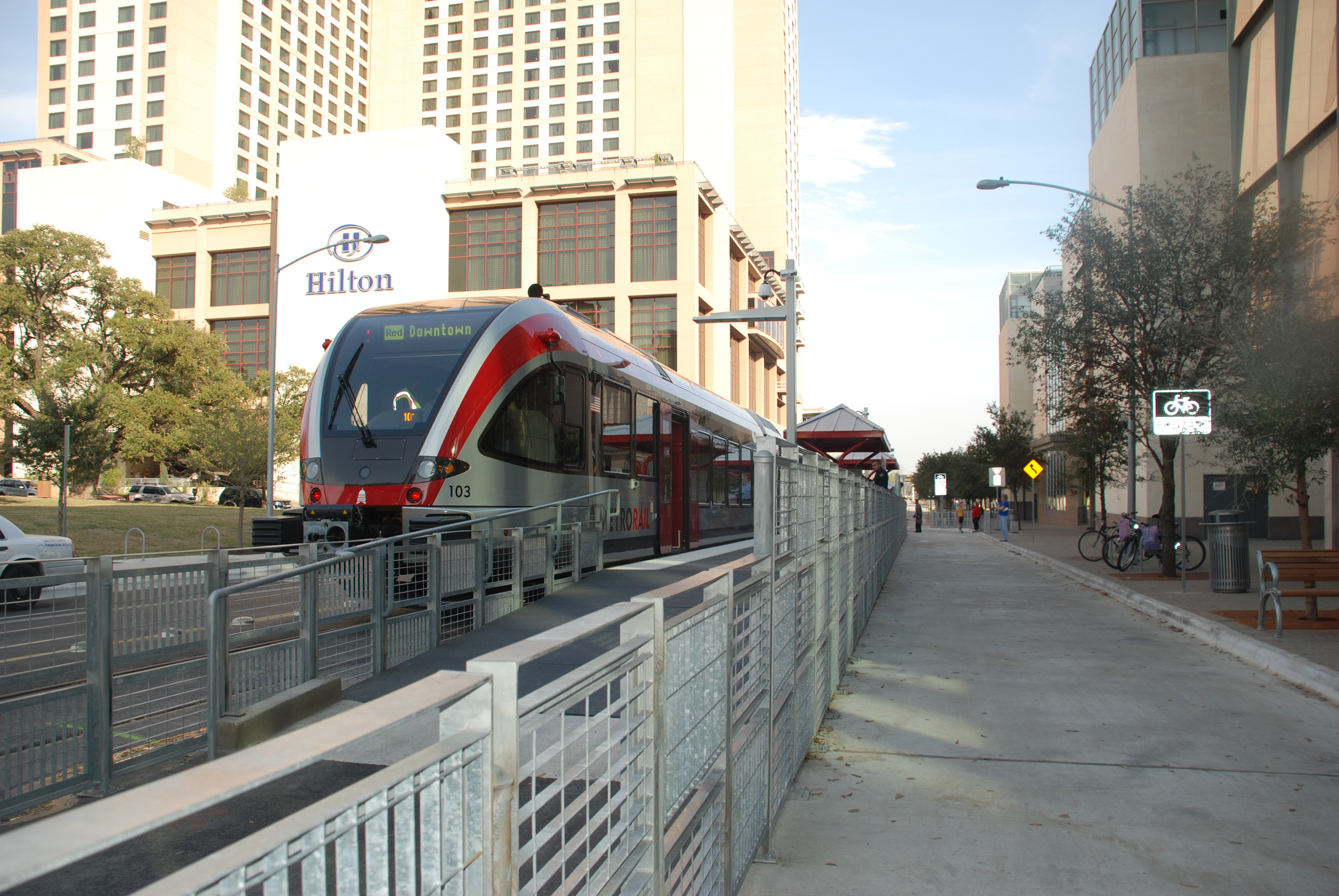
Old image of Downtown station, the southern terminus (2009)

CapMetro came back in 2004 with a significantly scaled-down version of its 2000 plan that it hoped voters in Travis County and Williamson County would find more palatable. Rather than a comprehensive network of electric light rail vehicles, CapMetro proposed a single diesel-fueled commuter rail line which would use the A&NW track between Downtown and Leander. The corridor was chosen for the first line after CapMetro's Board identified the following areas as probable areas for future growth: the Highland Mall area, the master-planned Mueller Community redevelopment project, as well as the central business district, extending from the University of Texas at Austin to Lady Bird Lake. MetroRail was presented to voters as part of the All Systems Go Long-Range Transit Plan, which also included expanded local and express bus service. The 2004 version was approved by 62% of voters in the service area.

The organization at the time said they could have the system built by 2008 for a cost of $60 million, and borrow $30 million for six train cars to be paid back over a period of years. About $30 million of that cost, they said, would come from the federal government. However, CapMetro never officially sought the federal money and revealed in 2010 it has spent $105 million on the system's construction, not $90 million as originally suggested. Additionally, the original 2008 launch date for CapMetro Rail was postponed two years due to multiple safety and construction issues. Service on CapMetro Rail finally began on March 22, 2010.

On June 26, 2014, TxDOT awarded CapMetro with a $50 million grant for the purchase of four new rail cars, which was anticipated to double capacity, and for general improvements to the Downtown MetroRail station.

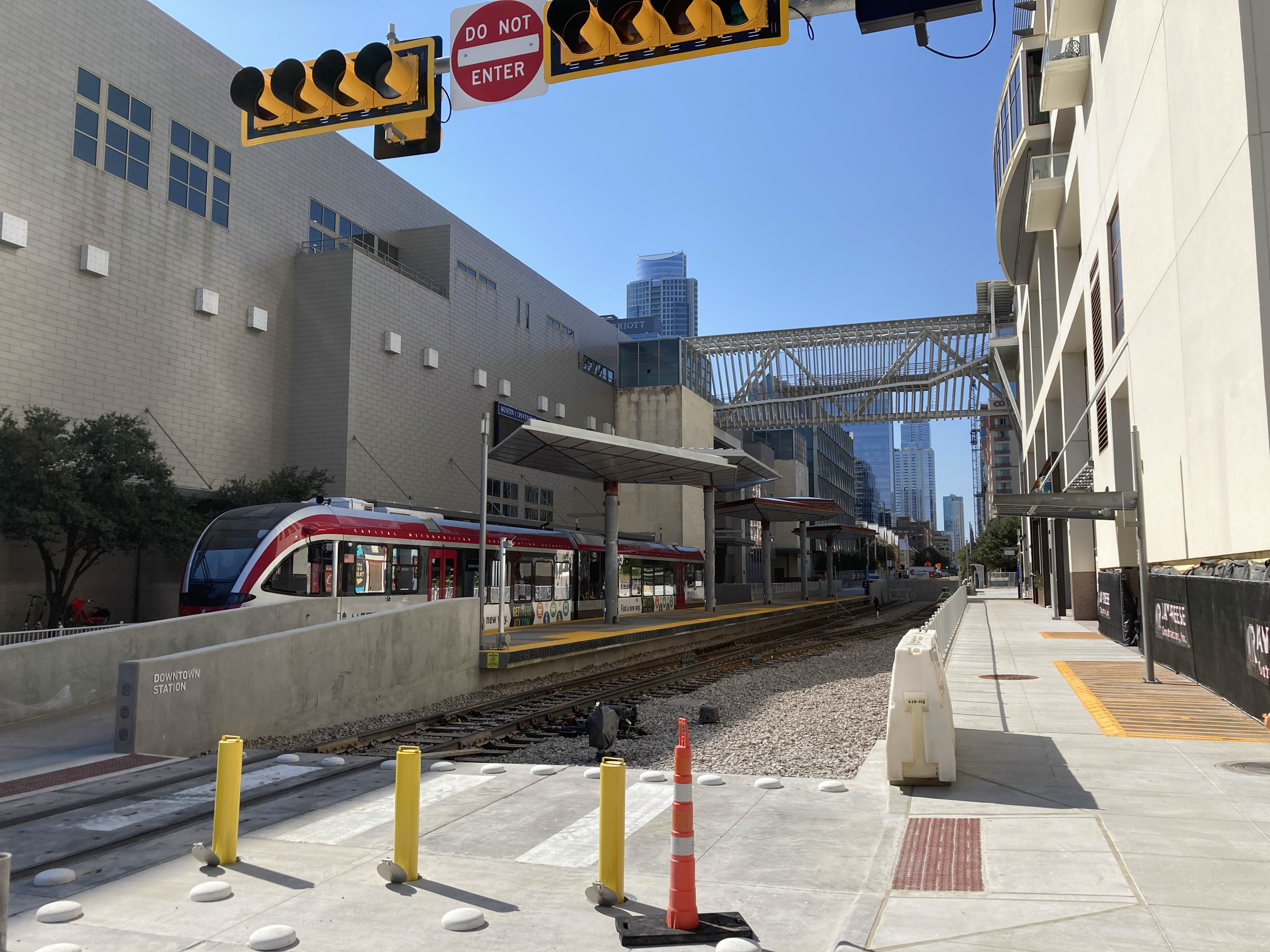
Downtown station after the remodeling and construction (2020)

By 2015, CapMetro had taken the first steps in the planning of a permanent downtown station. Although the estimates for cost of the proposed terminal were $30–35 million, $22 million of this sum came directly from a Texas Department of Transportation grant awarded to CapMetro in 2014. Proponents of the station asserted that it will not only alleviate the congestion problems associated with the current downtown MetroRail terminal, but also serve as a cultural hub wherein future residents and visitors can easily access many current and potential amenities, including but not limited, to additional transit systems, shopping, and recreational activities. The new permanent Downtown station opened on October 19, 2020.

=== 2014 vote ===
CapMetro continued planning for a light rail network running between neighborhoods of Austin's urban core. After the failure of the system proposed in 2000, by 2014 CapMetro had settled on a new, more easterly proposed routing: 9.5 miles through South Austin along Riverside, through Downtown and UT along Trinity and San Jacinto, and north along Red River and Airport to ACC Highland. In November 2014, when asked to approve $600 million in bonds to be repaid by property taxes to fund the system, Austin-area voters again rejected light rail, with only 43% voting in favor.

=== Project Connect approval and planning ===
The third light rail proposal drafted by CapMetro and submitted to voters was far more elaborate than the first two. Planners returned to a core concept of the 2000 proposal: a north-south line running west of UT and Downtown along Lamar and Guadalupe, then along South Congress Avenue south of Downtown. However, numerous other elements were also included in the November 2020 ballot proposition, bringing the total estimated cost of Project Connect to $7.1 billion, of which $5.8 billion would pay for the 20-mile light rail system. An east-west Blue Line running along Riverside to the airport was planned to connect with the Orange Line downtown, where both would run through a 1.6 mile tunnel expected to provide improved speed, reliability, and capacity compared to an on-street line. A Gold Line Bus Rapid Transit line reusing the 2014 east-of-downtown route, a Green Line along CapMetro-owned freight tracks to Manor and Elgin and new bus park-and-rides throughout the city rounded out the plan to sway voters beyond the reach of the planned light rail. Voters ultimately approved, by 58%, the increase in property taxes proposed to help fund the system.

After voter approval, the engineering and design of the light rail system continued. By 2022, the cost estimate to fully implement the original Project Connect plan had increased to $10.3 billion due to increased property acquisition prices, inflation caused by the COVID-19 pandemic, and scope changes to the original design. In particular, flood mitigation concerns, a Capitol View Corridor, and community engagement had combined to double the downtown tunnel's length to 4.2 miles.

The most recent version of the project, approved by the Austin City Council in June 2023, no longer includes a downtown tunnel after it was eliminated to reduce costs down to $4.5 billion and advance the project more quickly. Trains will initially run along 9.8 miles of dedicated street lanes, with the full system to be constructed once additional funds are available.

The project has faced opposition from Republican lawmakers; in 2023 and 2025 they unsuccessfully sought to disconnect the project from its property tax funding source, while Republican senator John Cornyn has stated publicly that he does not support the use of federal funding for the rail system, which is planned to cover half of the project costs.

== Operation ==
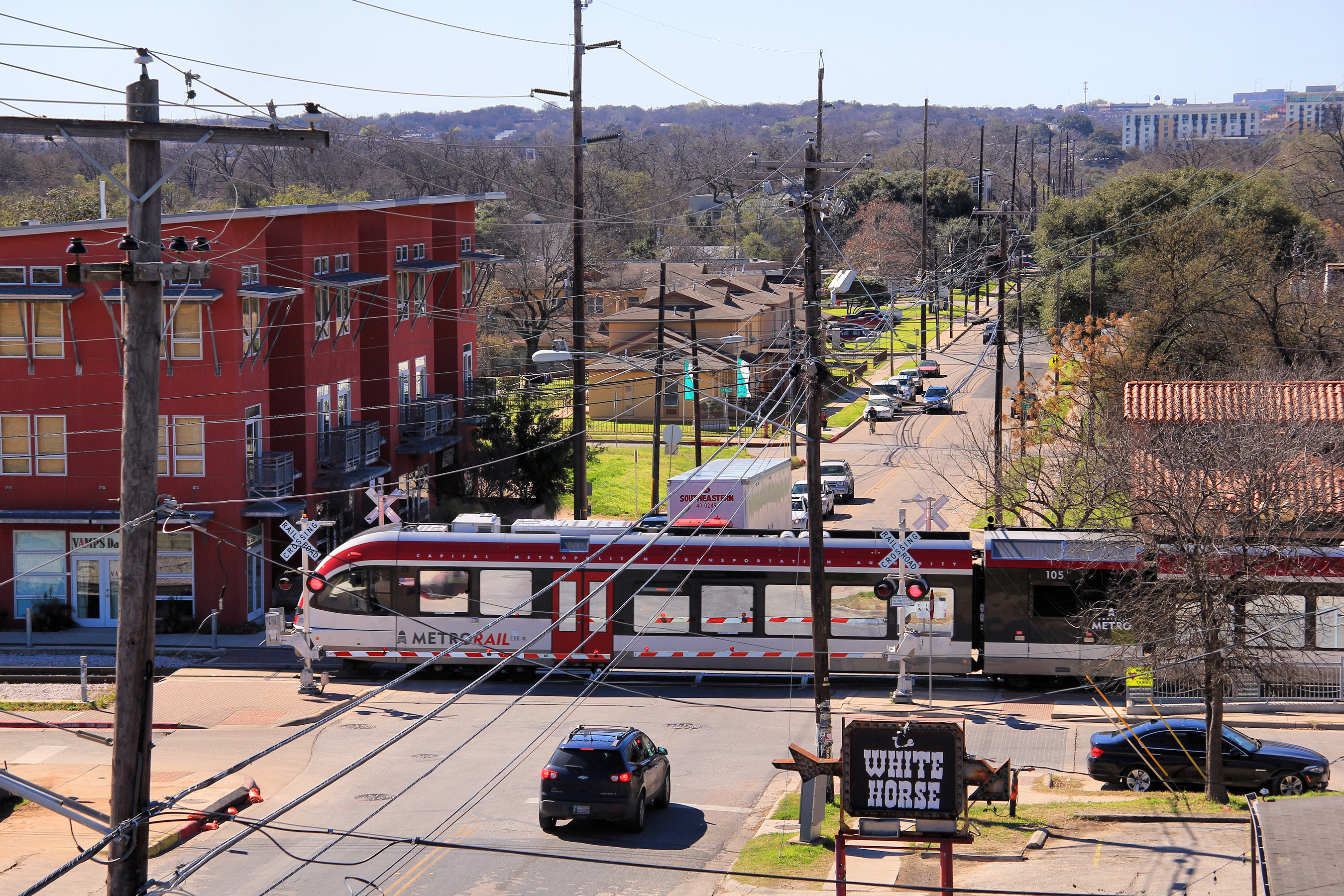
MetroRail train crossing Comal Street

The CapMetro Rail system currently consists of the Red Line, 32 miles (51 km) of track that connects Leander and the Austin Convention Center in Downtown Austin. The line also passes through Cedar Park, northwest Austin, north-central Austin, and east Austin. The annual cost to operate the Red Line is $14.3 million.

On January 18, 2011, CapMetro added 13 additional midday trains to the previously limited schedule, as well as increased runs during peak hours. Additionally, the organization will run trains on a regular schedule Friday and Saturday starting March 23, 2012. In addition to the normal Friday schedule, trains will run hourly from 7:00 pm to 12:00 am and every 35 minutes from 4:00 pm to 12:00 am on Saturday. Before beginning the regularly scheduled Friday and Saturday service CapMetro ran weekend service for special events, such as the SXSW festival.

=== Red Line ===
Currently, the CapMetro Rail system consists only of the Red Line, which is alternately designated as Route 550 on internal CapMetro documents. Its northern terminus is the Leander Station and Park & Ride and the southern terminus is the Downtown (Convention Center) Station. Each station features an accessible platform with varying canopy designs, ticket vending machines (TVM), bike racks, and informational displays. Its nine stations were constructed largely along existing freight rail tracks in cooperation with the City of Austin following a transit-oriented development (TOD) plan intended to encourage the use of public transportation by developing mixed-use residential and commercial areas around the stations. Frequencies are expected to improve to 15 minutes after double tracking is completed between Lakeline and Leander. The following Red Line stations are listed north to south:

County	Community	Station	Connections and notes
Williamson	Leander	Leander	CapMetro Bus 985, 987
Williamson	Avery Ranch-Lakeline, Austin	Lakeline	MetroBus 214, 383, 985, 987
Travis	Northwest Austin	Howard	MetroBus 50, 243
Travis	North Burnet-Gateway, Austin	North Burnet/ Uptown	Planned to open in 2027
Travis	North Burnet-Gateway, Austin	Kramer	MetroBus 392, 466 Slated to closed in 2027 after the opening of North Burnet/Uptown station
Travis	North Burnet-Gateway, Austin	McKalla	
Travis	Crestview, Austin	Crestview	MetroBus 1, 7, 300, 350, 801 (CapMetro Rapid)
Travis	Highland, Austin	Highland	MetroBus 7, 324, 337, 350 (at Highland Mall transit hub)
Travis	Chestnut, Austin	MLK Jr.	MetroBus 18, 465
Travis	East Cesar Chavez, Austin	Plaza Saltillo	
Travis	Downtown Austin	Downtown	MetroBus 2, 4, 6, 7, 10, 17 (walking distance), 837 (CapMetro Rapid)

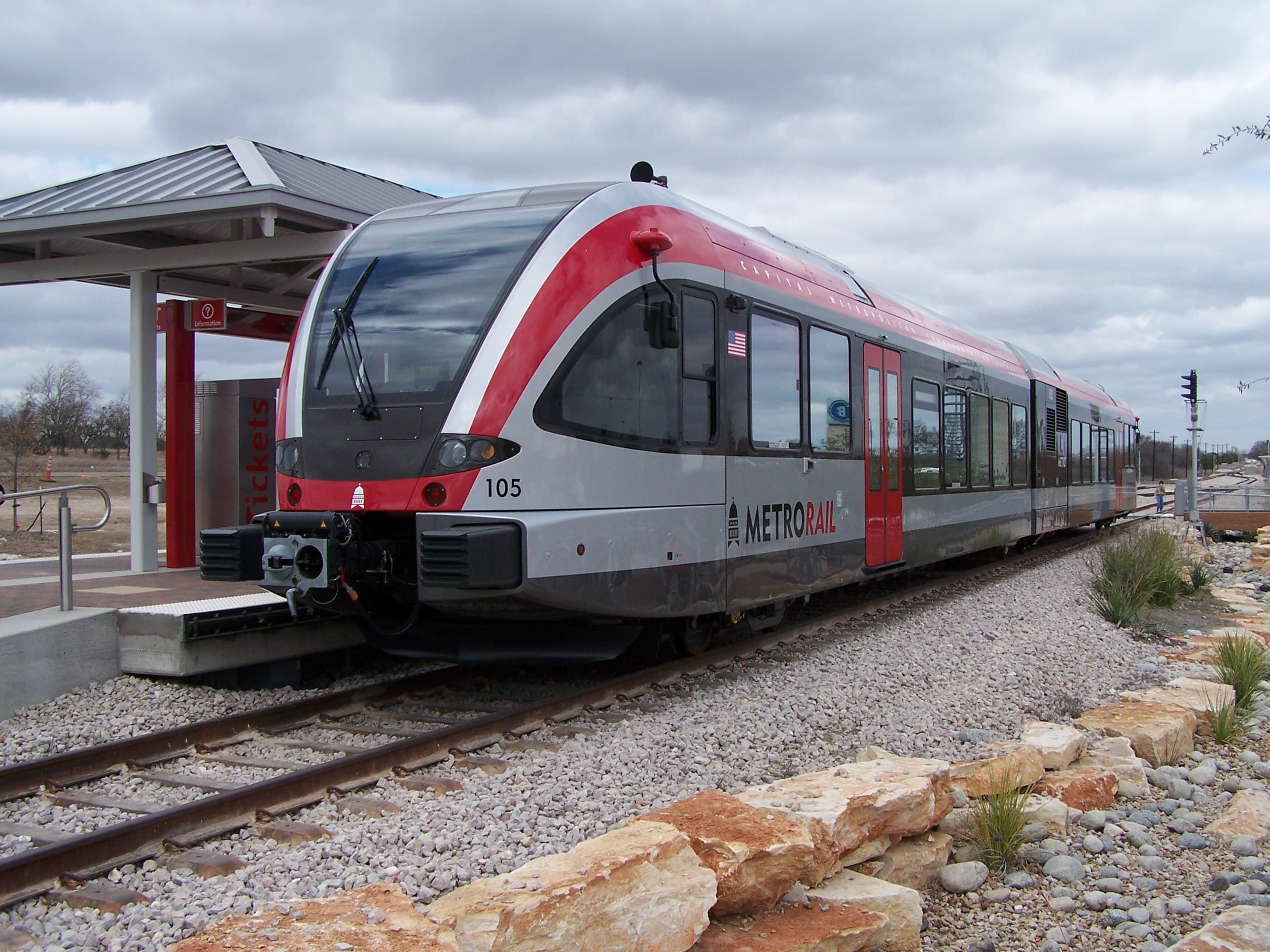
CapMetro GTW at Leander station, the northern terminus

Though trains are available past midnight on Fridays and Saturdays, the last train leaving downtown Monday through Thursday is at 7:20 pm.

== Rolling stock ==
CapMetro Rail approaching Plaza Saltillo station

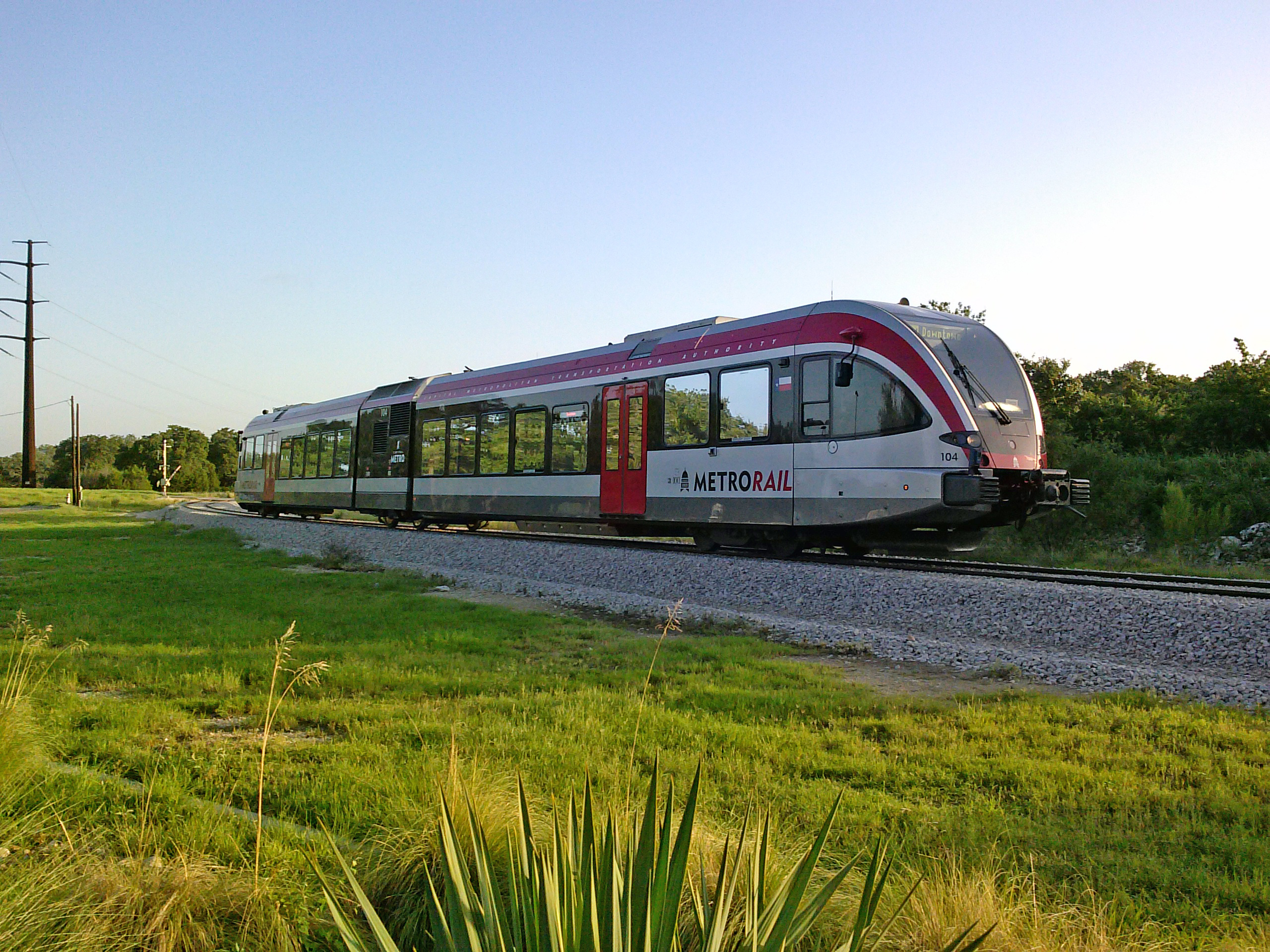
CapMetro Rail Red Line approaching Lakeline station

In September 2005, Stadler Rail won a bid to build six Stadler GTW diesel-electric light regional railcars for the system. Each of the vehicle's capital costs is about $6 million, and they run on two 375-kilowatt (503 hp) diesel–electric traction generators for 750 kilowatts (1,010 hp) total. They are 9 feet 8 inches (2.95 m) wide and 134 feet (41 m) long. In 2017, CapMetro received 4 new GTW trainsets from Stadler for the MetroRail Red Line. These new trains expanded the fleet from 6 to 10 units, and allowed CapMetro to increase the frequency of the Red Line. The new trains feature a slightly tweaked paint scheme (to better match the MetroBus paint scheme), LED destination displays instead of the flip-dot displays found on the older units, and an updated engine car design that features a rounded top rather than the angled top found on the older units. The units originally purchased in 2005 are numbered 101–106 and the newer units purchased in 2014 are numbered 201–204.

The vehicles have a capacity of 200 passengers, 108 seated and 92 standing. The trains have priority seating areas (fully ADA compliant) for wheelchair users. A "VIP section" with room for laptop use with Internet access is also included. Features include bike racks, luggage racks, high back racks, and low floor entry for easy access. Internet access is provided via 3G cellular-based service. CapMetro is currently researching upgrading access to 4G but is dependent on the carrier offering a commercial-grade product that will work with CapMetro's devices. For safety, the vehicles have ten cameras outside and six inside, as well as a sophisticated communications system.

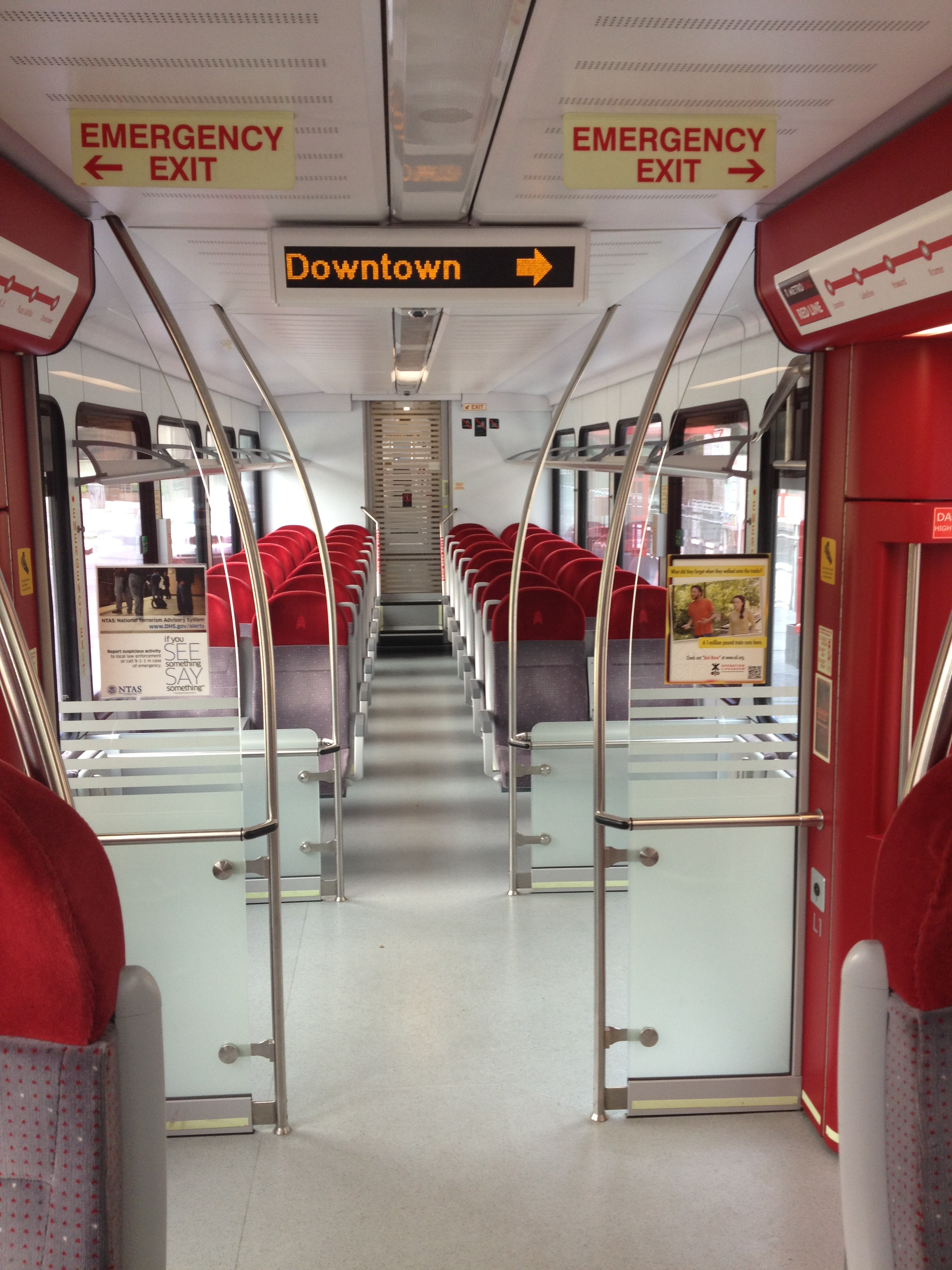
Inside MetroRail GTW train

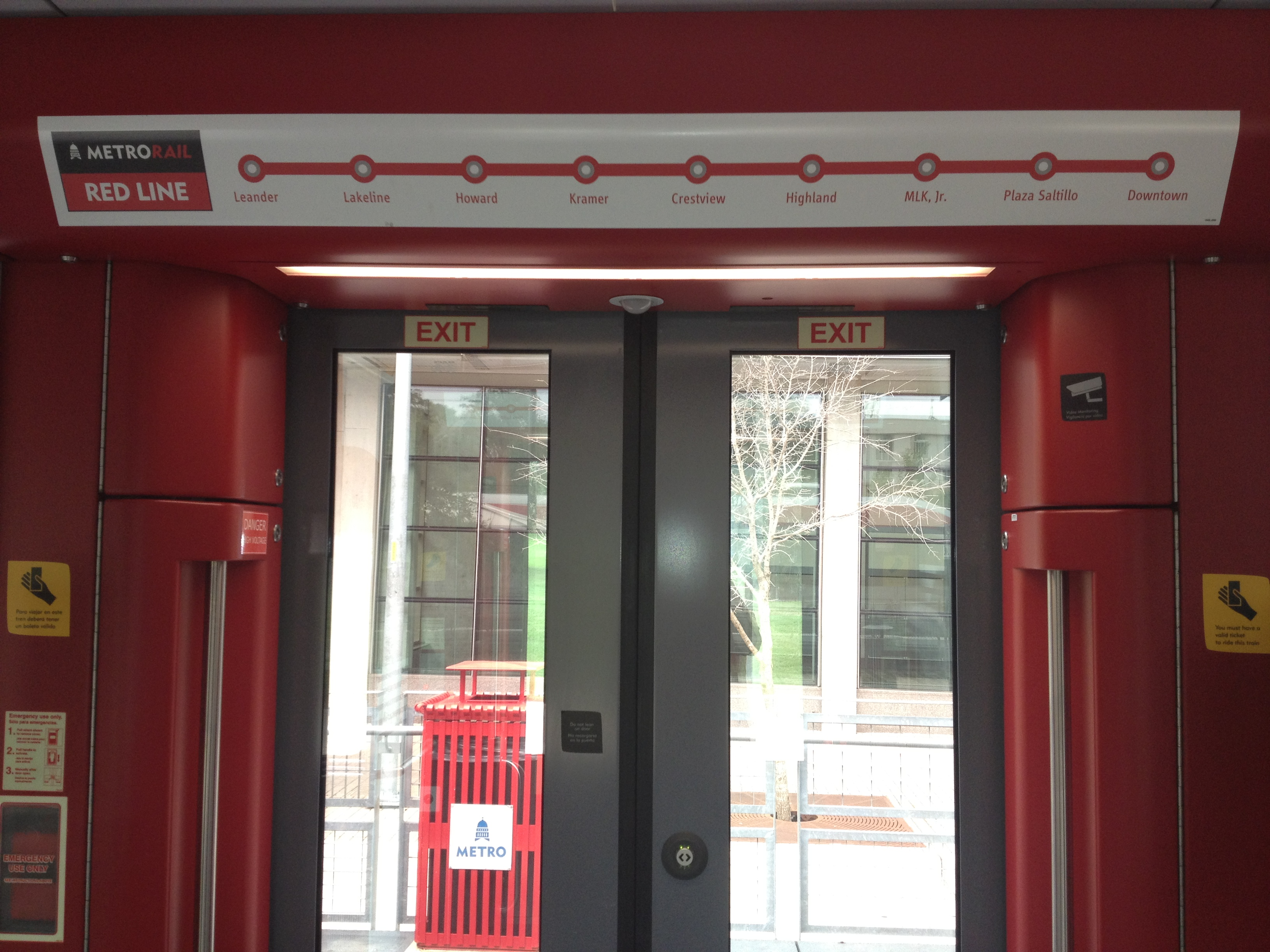
Door of MetroRail GTW train

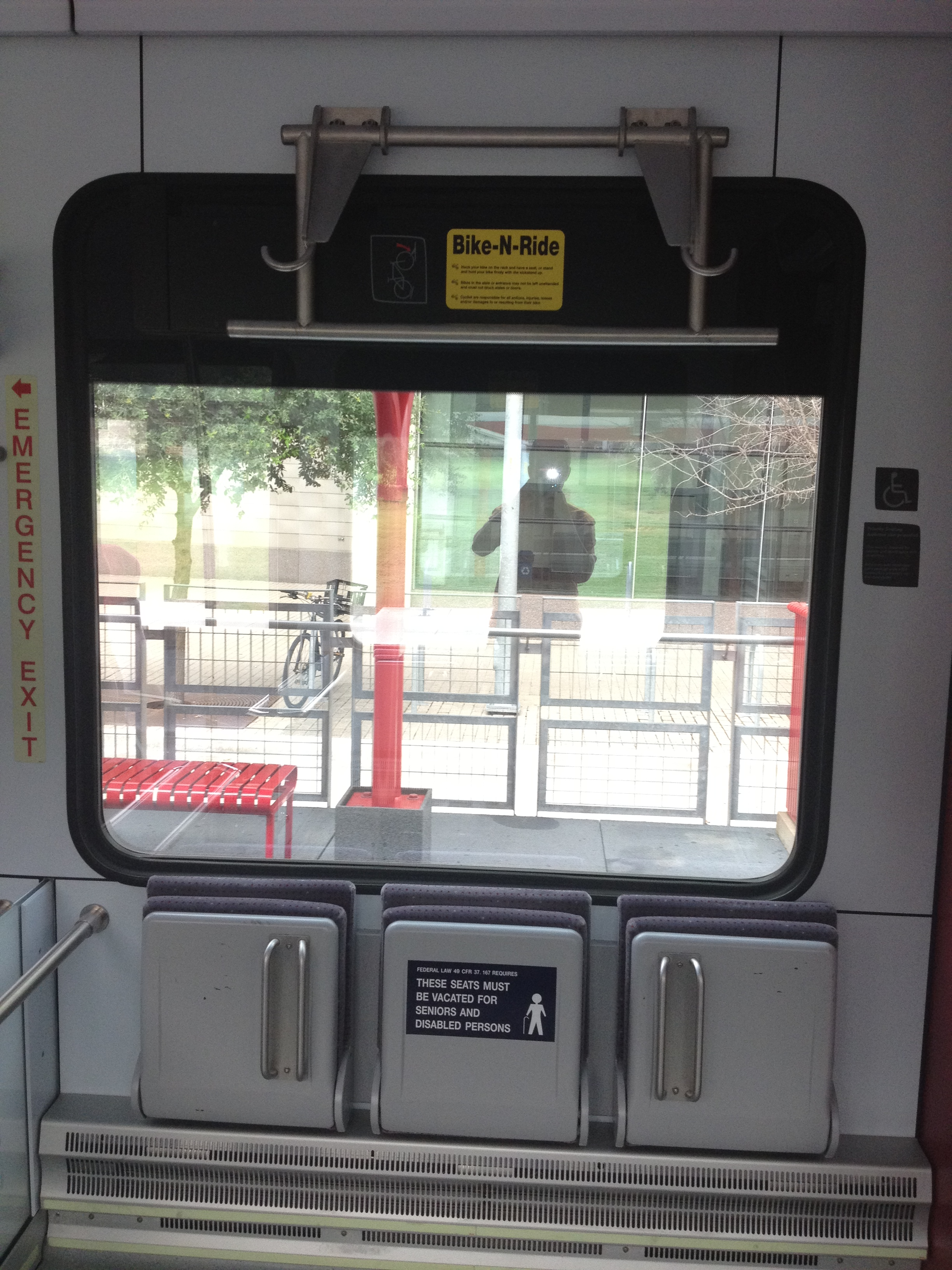
Bicycle rack on MetroRail GTW train

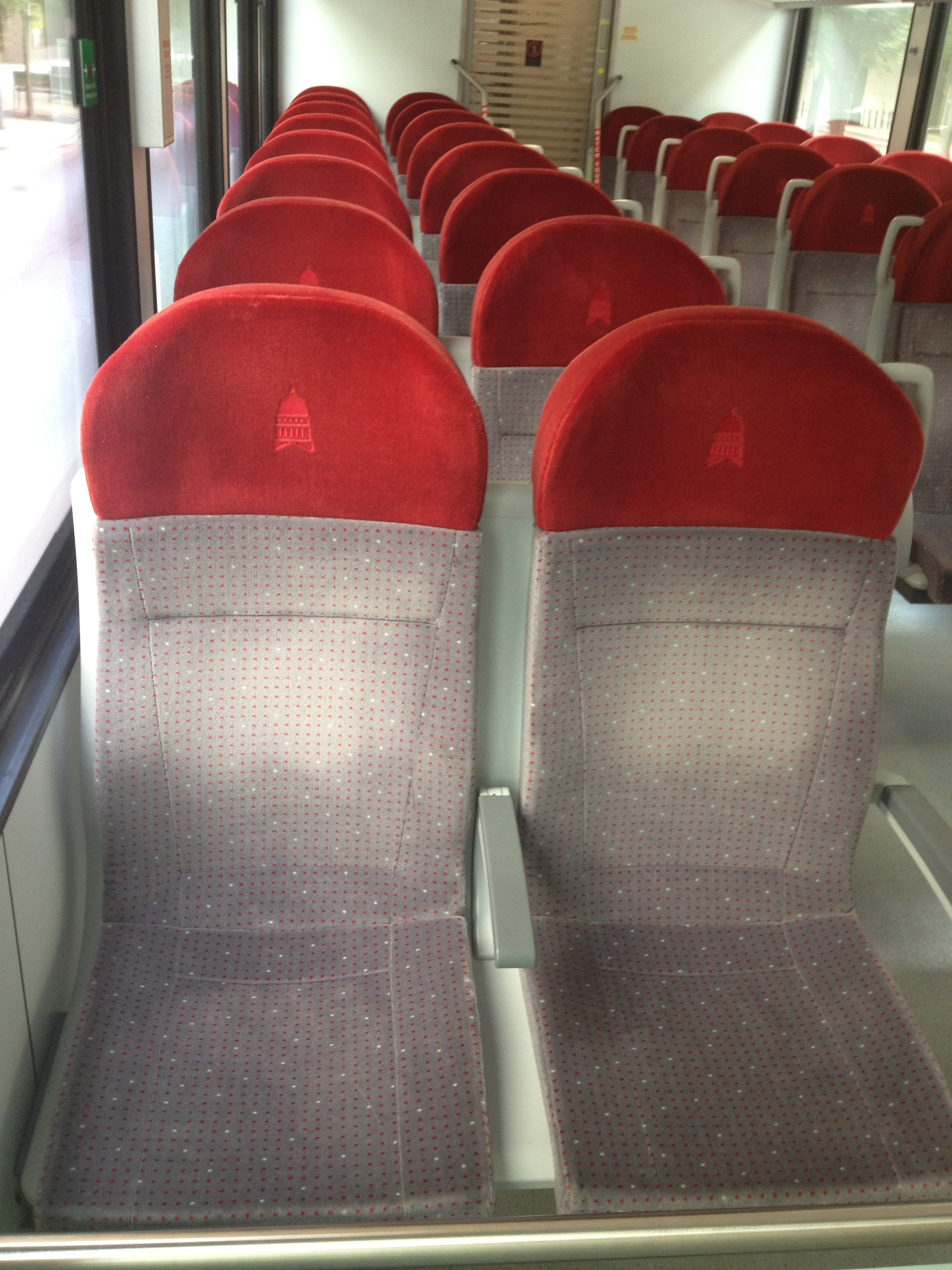
Seats on MetroRail GTW train

== Planned expansions ==
Any potential expansion would require another referendum in the CapMetro service area to secure funding. CapMetro's All Systems Go Plan includes a study into potential future service. Below are a few expansions which are either in the planning process or otherwise being actively considered.

=== Passing tracks ===
Construction was recently completed on a new passing siding between Park St. and Discovery Blvd. along the northernmost portion of the Red Line in Leander. This siding, along with various other improvements, will allow the Red Line to run 15-minute frequencies for the first time in its history, more than doubling the current maximum frequency of ~37 minutes. Construction on the siding was completed in November 2022.

=== MoKan Corridor ===
CapMetro has plans to build a new rail line along the abandoned MoKan railway line, which is owned by TxDOT, to Georgetown, Round Rock, and Pflugerville.

=== MetroRail Red Line additional stations ===
As part of Project Connect, CapMetro has built a new station along the Red Line, at McKalla (adjacent to the Austin FC soccer stadium). A second station is proposed for North Burnet/Uptown (The Domain). When completed these would replace the existing Kramer station.

=== CapMetro Green Line ===
In September 2008, CapMetro evaluated the need for rail service to alleviate pressure from congestion downtown to Colony Park, with a potential extension to Elgin. To fix this problem, CapMetro decided to plan for adding another rail line to their service, or the Green Line. The Green Line would operate with similar service characteristics as the Red Line, as it would also run on existing freight tracks with schedule adjustments made to allow for passenger rail service.

Trains would depart the Red Line and begin to head east in between the Red Line stations MLK Jr. and Plaza Saltillo, where the first stop would be Pleasant Valley; more new stations will be at Springdale, East US 183, Loyola/Johnny Morris, and Colony Park. A potential future extension beyond Colony Park with new stations at Wildhorse, Manor, and Elgin. The Green Line will be built from Downtown to Colony Park first, with the extension to Elgin considered at a later time. In December 2008, a presentation, and then a follow-up, were given to the CAMPO Transit Work Group about the Green Line. In May 2018, the Travis County Commissioners Court voted 3–2 to move forward with a viability study of the Green Line.

=== CapMetro Orange Line ===
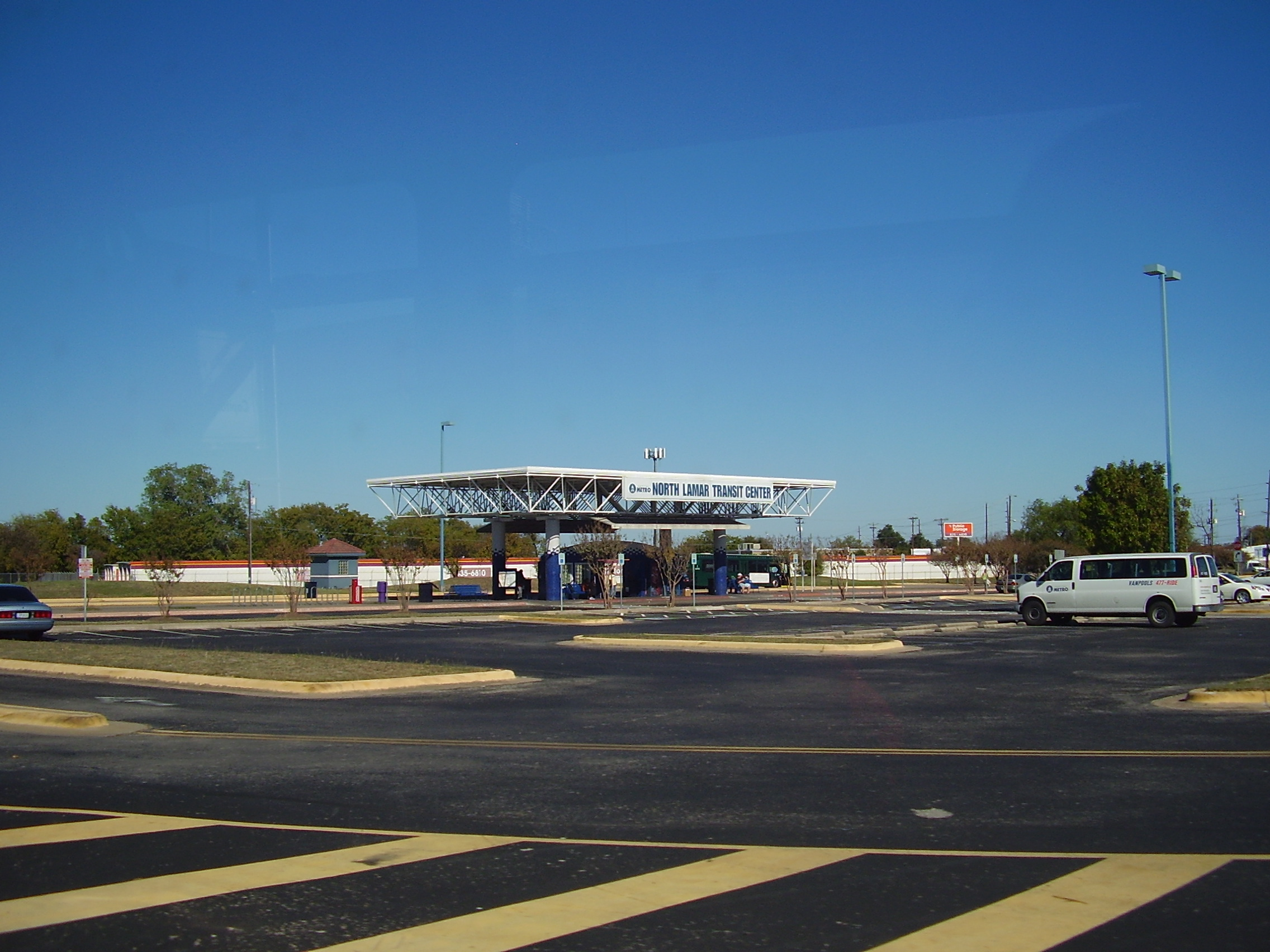
North Lamar Transit Center, planned northern terminus of the Orange and Blue light rail lines

A contract was approved for the Orange Line on March 20, 2019. The Orange Line is a planned 20-mile (32 km) light rail line that will run in a dedicated transitway, which will allow it to bypass the traffic that plagues the corridor it follows. The Orange Line will operate from North Lamar Transit Center to Stassney & Congress, and will follow the current route of the 801 or a similar alignment. The stations will be North Lamar Transit Center, Crestview (where a transfer to the Red Line will be possible), Koenig, Triangle, Hyde Park (38th), Hemphill Park (29th), UT West Mall (24th), Capitol West, Government Center, Republic Square, Auditorium Shores, SoCo, Oltorf, St. Edward's, South Congress Transit Center, and Stassney. A potential future extension north to Tech Ridge and south to Slaughter is being considered. The new stations would be at Tech Ridge, Parmer, Braker, Rundberg, William Cannon, and Slaughter. In 2020, the planned route was truncated in length to reduce construction costs, with bus bridges providing connectivity through the rest of the corridor.

=== CapMetro Blue Line ===
The Blue Line is a planned 15-mile (24 km) light rail line that will operate from North Lamar Transit Center to Austin–Bergstrom International Airport. It will follow the Orange Line's route from North Lamar Transit Center to Republic Square, and will follow the current route of MetroBus route 20 or a similar alignment to Austin–Bergstrom International Airport. New stations will be North Lamar Transit Center, Crestview (where a transfer to the Red Line will be possible), Koenig, Triangle, Hyde Park (38th), Hemphill Park (29th), UT West Mall (24th), Capitol West, Government Center, Republic Square, Downtown Station, Macc/Rainey, Waterfront, Travis Heights, Lakeshore, Riverside, Faro, Montopolis, Metrocenter, and Austin–Bergstrom International Airport.

=== CapMetro Gold Line ===
The Gold Line is a planned 9.5-mile (15.3 km) bus rapid transit line that would operate from Austin Community College's Highland campus to the South Congress Transit Center park-and-ride, and will travel on Airport, Red River, San Jacinto/Trinity, 7th/8th, Neches/Red River, 4th, Riverside, and South Congress. Stations will be ACC Highland, Clarkson, Hancock, St. David's, UT East, Medical School, Capitol East, Trinity, Downtown Station (where transfer to the Red, Green, or Blue Lines will be possible), Republic Square, Auditorium Shores, SoCo (South Congress), Oltorf, St. Edward's, and South Congress Transit Center. The Gold Line was changed to light rail in May 2020, citing a demographic that showed an increased projected ridership along the gold line that prompted its conversion to light rail. In July 2020, planning for the line was reverted to bus service to lower construction costs in response to the economic crisis caused by the COVID-19 pandemic.

== See also ==
- Tram-train
- Commuter rail in North America
- List of United States commuter rail systems by ridership
- List of rail transit systems in the United States
- Stadler GTW
