= Green Line (CapMetro) =

Proposed hybrid rail service in Austin, Texas

Overview
- Status: In planning
- Locale: Austin, Texas
- Termini: Colony Park (future extension to Elgin); Downtown

Service
- Type: Hybrid rail
- System: CapMetro Rail
- Operator(s): Capital Metropolitan Transportation Authority

History
- Planned opening: 2033

Technical
- Track gauge: 4 ft 8 1/2 in (1,435 mm) standard gauge

The Green Line is a hybrid rail service planned to connect the Northeast Austin area of Colony Park with the downtown Austin, Texas area in the United States. It is still in the planning stages as a part of CapMetro's Project Connect.

In September 2008, CapMetro evaluated the need for rail service to alleviate pressure from congestion downtown to Colony Park, with a potential extension to Elgin. To fix this problem, CapMetro initiated planning for a new rail line. The Green Line would operate the same as the Red Line, as it would run on an existing freight rail - the Austin Western Railroad - with adjustments made to them to allow for passenger rail service. In December 2008, a presentation, and then a follow-up, were given to the CAMPO Transit Work Group about the Green Line. In May 2018, the Travis County Commissioners Court voted 3–2 to move forward with a viability study of the Green Line. The project's National Environmental Policy Act review is expected to begin in 2028, with revenue service possibly starting in 2033.

Trains would depart the Red Line and head east in between the MLK Jr. and Plaza Saltillo stations, where the first stop would be Pleasant Valley; more new stations will be at Springdale, East US 183, Loyola/Johnny Morris, Colony Park. A potential future extension beyond Colony Park would feature new stations at Wildhorse, Manor, and Elgin. The Green Line will be built from Downtown to Colony Park first, with the extension to Elgin considered at a later time.
