= Downtown station (CapMetro Rail) =

Hybrid rail station in Austin, Texas

Downtown
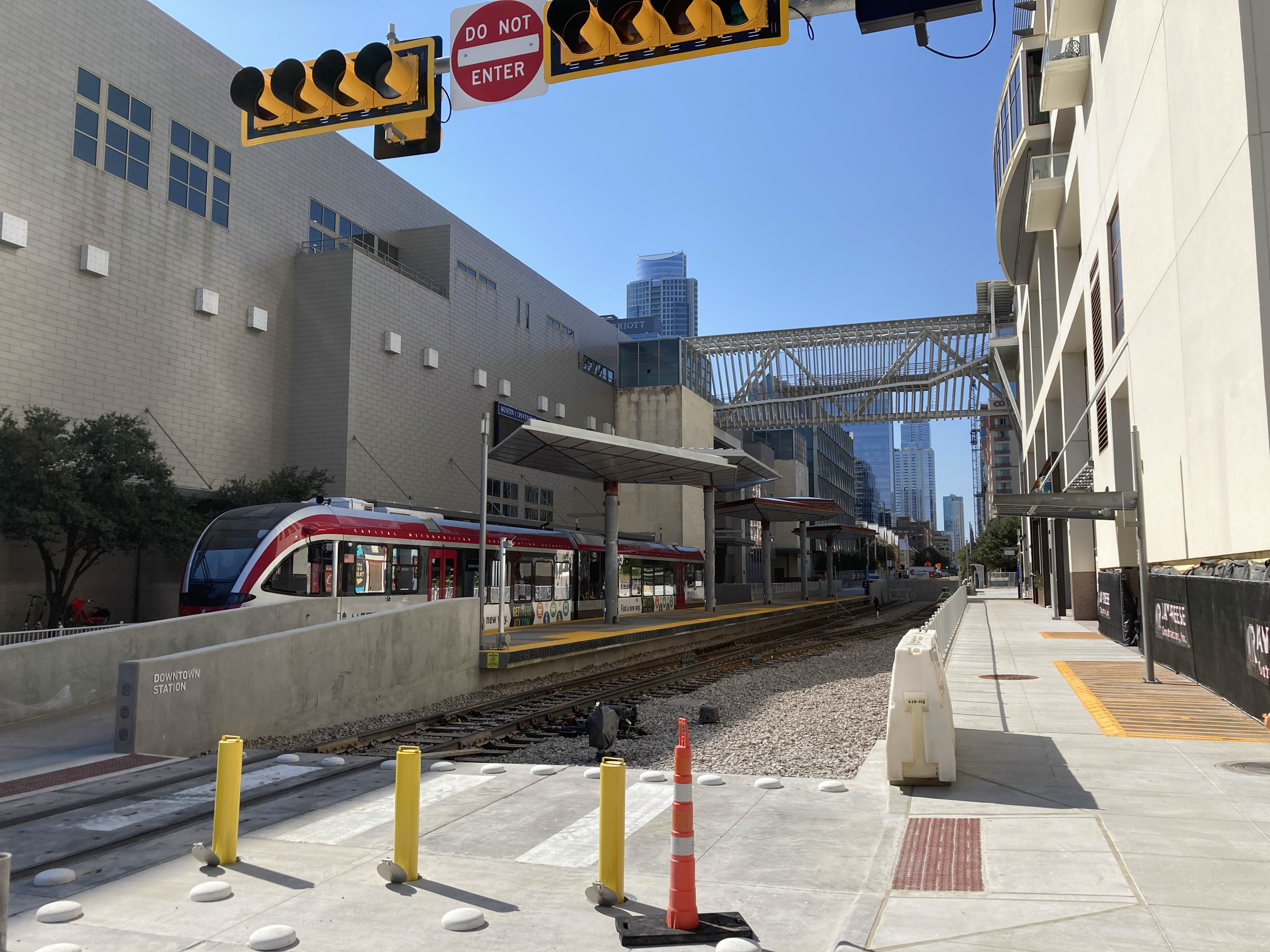
- Downtown station after the 2020 renovation

General information
- Location: 401 East Fourth Street; Austin, Texas 78701
- Coordinates: 30.265012°N 97.739503°W
- Owner: CapMetro
- Platforms: 1 side platform (2010–2019); 1 island platform and 1 side platform (2020–present)
- Connections: 4, 17; Waller Creek Greenbelt Trail

Construction
- Parking: Street
- Cycle facilities: Yes (Bikeshare)
- Accessible: Yes

History
- Opened: March 22, 2010
- Rebuilt: October 19, 2020 (opening of permanent Downtown station)

Services
Preceding station	CapMetro Rail	Following station
Plaza Saltillo toward Leander	Red Line	Terminus
Future services
Preceding station	CapMetro Rail	Following station
Plaza Saltillo toward Colony Park	Green Line	Terminus
Location

Downtown station is a CapMetro Rail hybrid rail station in Austin, Texas, United States. It is located in Downtown Austin at the corner of Fourth and Neches Street behind the Austin Convention Center. It is the current southern terminus of the Red Line. It was also the smallest, but busiest CapMetro Rail station, before it was rebuilt and expanded.

== History ==
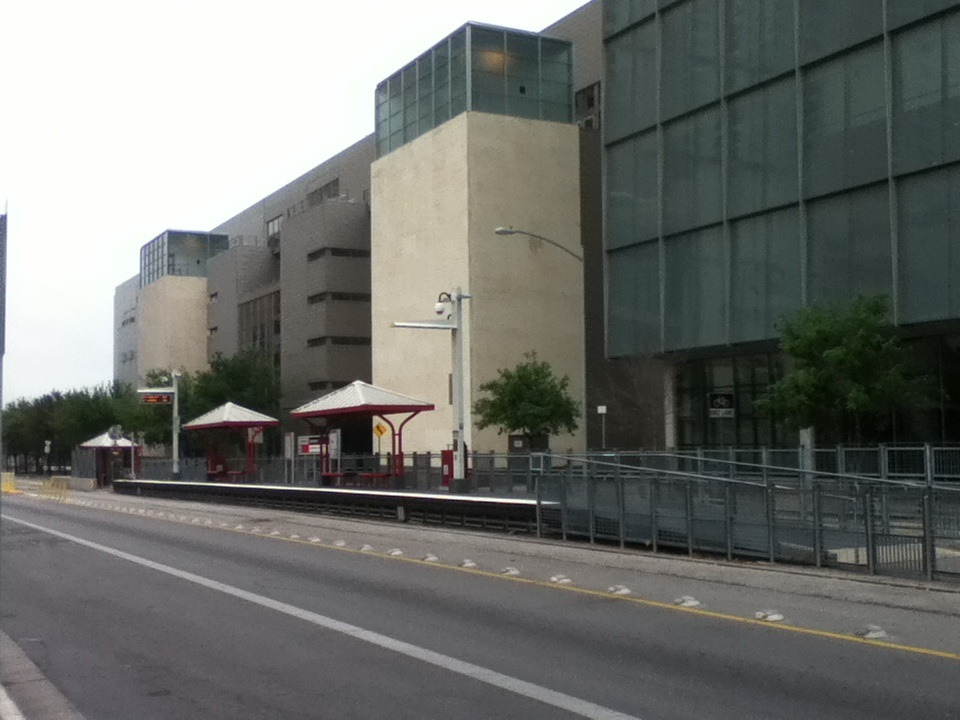
The former station seen in 2012

Construction began in August 2008 and concluded in November of that year. On June 2, 2019, the Downtown station temporarily closed so that construction on an expanded station (three-track, two-platform) could commence; it was later reopened in early November of that year, but without Saturday service until the end of 2019. Construction on the new station proceeded until October 2020, when the permanent Downtown station opened.

=== Reconstruction ===
In 2015, CapMetro announced its plans to rebuild the Downtown station to allow greater frequency and capacity on the Red Line. Construction on the new station started in 2019 when the existing 1-track, 1-platform station was torn down and a temporary station was built two blocks east of the existing station. The new station was said to have 3 tracks and 2 platforms, and will sit one block east of the existing station, paralleling 4th street between Neches and Red River Street. It will help ease congestion during high passenger volume periods, such as during the SXSW festival held at the adjacent Austin Convention Center.

Traffic on Neches Street heading south will no longer be able to turn right onto 4th street and instead will have to turn around due to the large waiting plaza at the west end of the station. However, the Lance Armstrong Bikeway will continue along 4th street, paralleling the new station and ending at Trinity Street. Cars heading south on Red River Street will no longer be able to turn right onto 4th Street, and will only be able to continue straight along Red River Street, crossing the CapMetro Rail tracks as it does. There will be one one-way westbound traffic lane on the north side of 4th Street between the I-35 frontage road and Red River street, where it then will be forced to turn right or left onto Red River street. The block of 4th street between Trinity and Neches street will be a pedestrian plaza equipped with ticket kiosks, shade trees, and benches.

In 2019, CapMetro was forced to cut back the design of the new station due to a shortage of labor and tariffs imposed by the Trump administration that raised the price of steel. The changes include shortening the northernmost track to allow it to hold only 1 train instead of 2, reducing the number of shade canopies from 7 to 5, temporarily removing ticketing kiosks, and removing some landscaping and decorative concrete from the pedestrian plaza. The stripped design will reduce the station's capacity from 6 trains to 4 trains, and only the middle of the 3 tracks will be long enough to hold a 2-unit consist. However, the station is designed to allow the northernmost track and platform to be easily extended to allow 2 one-unit trains or 1 two-unit train to sit in the platform, similar to the design of the middle track. This would allow the station to hold up to 5 trains. The new downtown station will serve the existing Red Line and allow it to increase its frequency to 15 minute headways per direction, replacing the current minimum headway of 30 minutes. The new station will also eventually serve the Green Line, a proposed commuter rail line that will run from the downtown station to as far east as Elgin.

The permanent Downtown station opened on October 19, 2020, several months ahead of schedule and under budget.

With Project Connect, the Green Line will also terminate with the Red Line. The planned light rail will also stop at Downtown.

== Bus connections ==
- #4 7th Street
- #17 Cesar Chavez
