= CapMetro =

Mass transit system in Austin, Texas, and surrounding areas

Capital Metropolitan Transportation Authority

Overview
- Area served: Austin; Travis County; Parts of Williamson County
- Locale: Central Texas
- Transit type: Bus; local; express; BRT; Hybrid rail; Vanpool; Rideshare; Bike share; Paratransit
- Number of lines: 49 Metro bus; 12 Special bus; 8 Express bus; 19 UT shuttle bus; 1 hybrid rail
- Number of stations: 2,300 Bus stops; 17 park and ride/transit centers; 26 CapMetro Rapid station pairs; 10 hybrid rail stations
- Daily ridership: 77,400 (weekdays, Q2 2026)
- Annual ridership: 26,283,400 (2025)
- Chief executive: Dottie Watkins
- Headquarters: 2910 East Fifth Street; Austin, Texas
- Website: capmetro.org

Operation
- Began operation: July 1, 1985; 41 years ago
- Operator: Keolis (bus and UT shuttle); MTM Transit (Metro Access and Pickup by Metro); CARTS (Manor Pickup, Manor/Elgin Express and select feeder routes); Herzog Transit Services (CapMetro Rail)
- Number of vehicles: 368 Buses; 30+ E-buses; 55 MetroRapid buses; 10 Diesel electric trains; 257 Vanpool vehicles; 213 Paratransit vehicles

The Capital Metropolitan Transportation Authority, officially styled CapMetro, is a public transportation provider located in Austin, Texas. It operates bus, paratransit services and a hybrid rail system known as CapMetro Rail in Austin and several suburbs in Travis and Williamson counties. In 2025, the system had a ridership of 26,283,400, or about 77,400 per weekday as of the second quarter of 2026.

Voters approved the creation of CapMetro in January 1985, agreeing to fund the organization with a one percent sales tax. Operations began in July 1985 and CapMetro took over City of Austin bus services in 1986. In 2010, the CapMetro Rail Red Line, the agency's first rail service, began operations.

== History ==
=== Predecessors ===
The predecessors of CapMetro date back to the late 1800s with the establishment of streetcar services in Austin. In 1874, the City of Austin granted the Austin City Railroad Company a franchise for a "horse or mule railroad" on Congress Avenue, Pecan Street (since renamed Sixth Street), and 11th Street. Construction of the line began on Pecan in November 1874 and mule-drawn streetcars began operations in January the next year. The company changed ownership several times until 1889 when it was bought by a group of Boston and Chicago investors who planned to extend services and convert the system to electricity. However, before they could do so a new competitor began operations.

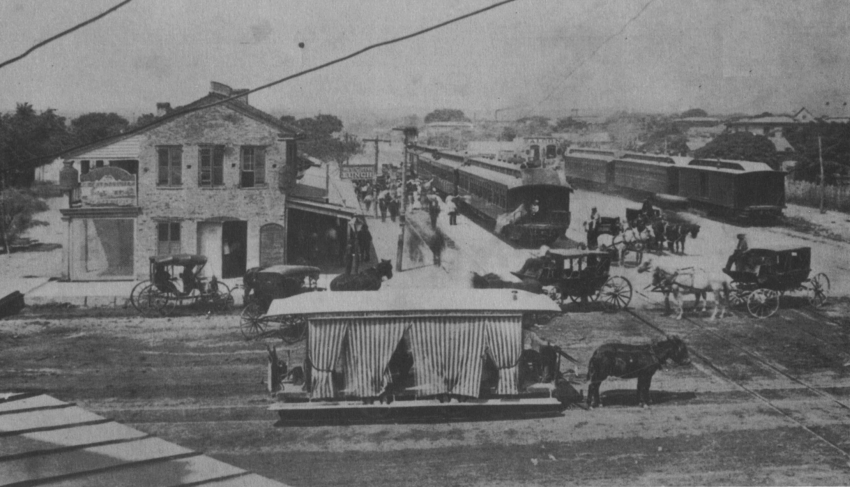
Mule-drawn streetcar in 1876 at the Austin I & GN depot

In 1890, real estate developer Monroe M. Shipe received a city charter to operate electric streetcars on city streets. Initially, this covered only roads not already occupied by other track, but he later convinced the city council to also allow him to operate on Congress Avenue and Pecan Street. Shipe had started a streetcar suburb venture two and a half miles north of the city called Hyde Park, the destination for the first line. By February 1891, Shipe had built 5 miles of track, a new powerhouse to provide electricity for the line, and began operations as the Austin Rapid Transit Railway Company in places running just a few feet from the mule car tracks.

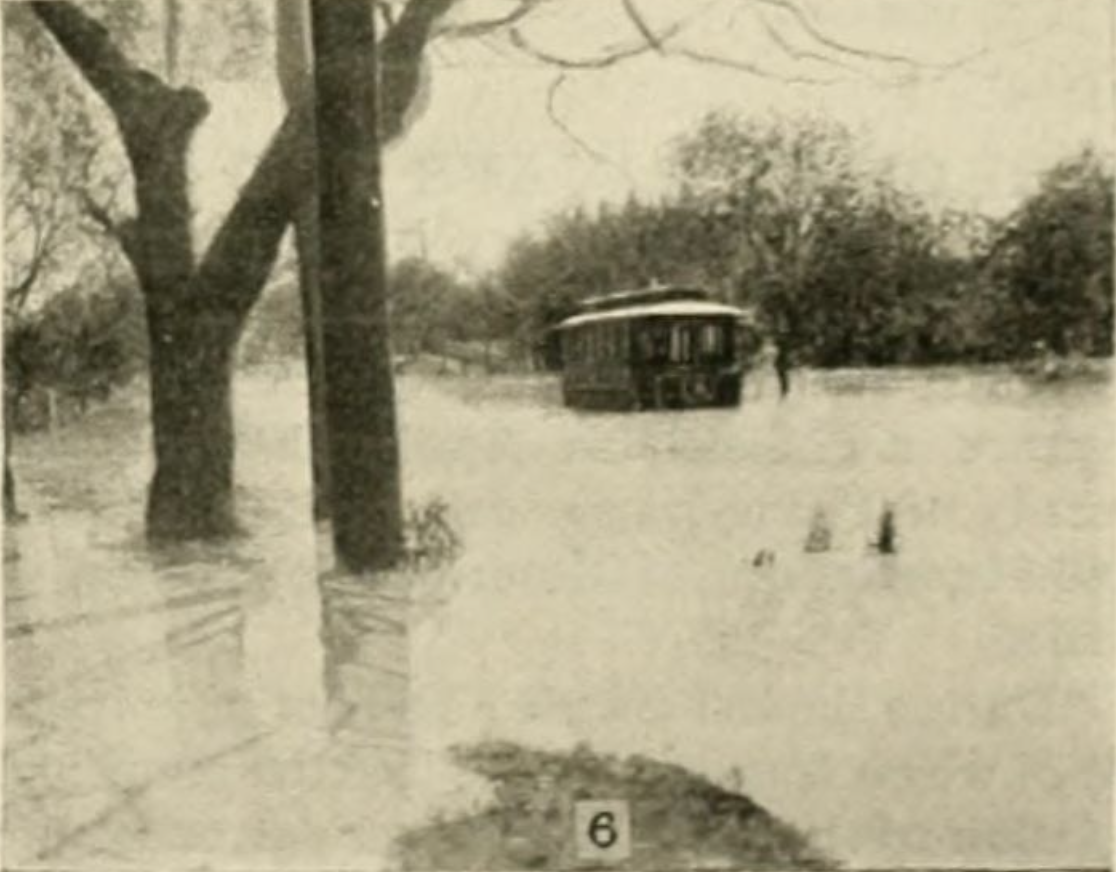
Austin Rapid Transit streetcar stranded in the flood caused by the failure of the Austin Dam

Just a few months after the electric streetcars started running, an Austin City Railroad mule stable was destroyed in a fire and a few weeks later the company merged into the Austin Rapid Transit Railway leading to the end of mule-drawn service in October. The streetcar service faced challenges over the next years including a lack of power that forced the service to return to mules at several points. In 1897, the company began buying power from the first Austin Dam, which had been completed in 1893, but in 1899 a drought and breakdown of a company-owned powerhouse left them without power for months. Then, in April 1900, the Austin Dam failed catastrophically. Following the dam break, the electric streetcars were again mule-drawn until the company finished building its own power plant.

The Austin Rapid Transit Railway had operated at a loss from 1892 and was in receivership from 1897 until it shut down in 1902 selling its assets at auction to its president, F. H. Watriss. Watriss established the Austin Electric Railway Company in 1902 and the old company was merged into the new one. The new company lasted until 1911 when it was bought by New England investors and renamed the Austin Street Railway Company. In the early 1910s the company faced stiff competition from jitney drivers who would follow streetcar lines offering cheaper service but those disappeared when they were unable to meet a city bond requirement. From the late 1910s into the 1930s, increasing automobile usage cut into streetcar revenue.

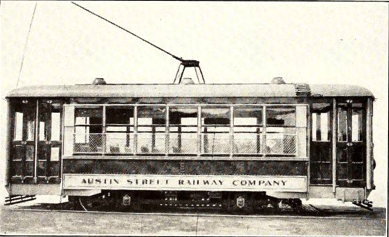
Austin Street Railway vehicle in 1917

Austin Street Railway began offering bus service on certain routes in the late 1920s. At the time, the company was operating 23 miles of track but by 1939 that was down to 17 miles and it was running 29 miles of bus routes. The last streetcar line to operate was the main line which began on Congress Avenue, ran south of the capitol to Lavaca Street, north on Lavaca to 19th street, then west to Guadalupe ending in a loop at Hyde Park. It was replaced by bus service in February 1940 and the same month Austin Street Railway changed its name to the Austin Transit Company.

For the next several decades, the Austin Transit Company was the city's contractor for transportation services. In 1969 and 1970 contentious contract negotiations between the city and the bus operator led to significant changes. In June 1970 the city had granted a franchise to Transportation Enterprises Inc. (TEI) to run a shuttle bus service at the University of Texas. TEI already had contracts from the university to provide bus services. Austin Transit balked at this claiming the city had breached its contract by allowing TEI authority to operate in areas that Austin Transit was already serving. Austin Transit gave the city an ultimatum saying they would cease operations July 31 unless the city bought the company. Instead, the city expanded TEI's contract to cover the rest of the city using school buses which began August 1 after Austin Transit carried through on their threat. However, by November TEI said it was losing US$20,000 and would have to stop service January 1 forcing the city start subsidizing operations in January 1971.

However, by March 1971 Austin Transit had a new contract with the city and restarted operations now with a city subsidy. The next year, the city created the Austin Transit System, a city agency which began operations in January 1973 with Austin Transit Co. as the operator of the now city-owned system.

=== Establishment of CapMetro ===
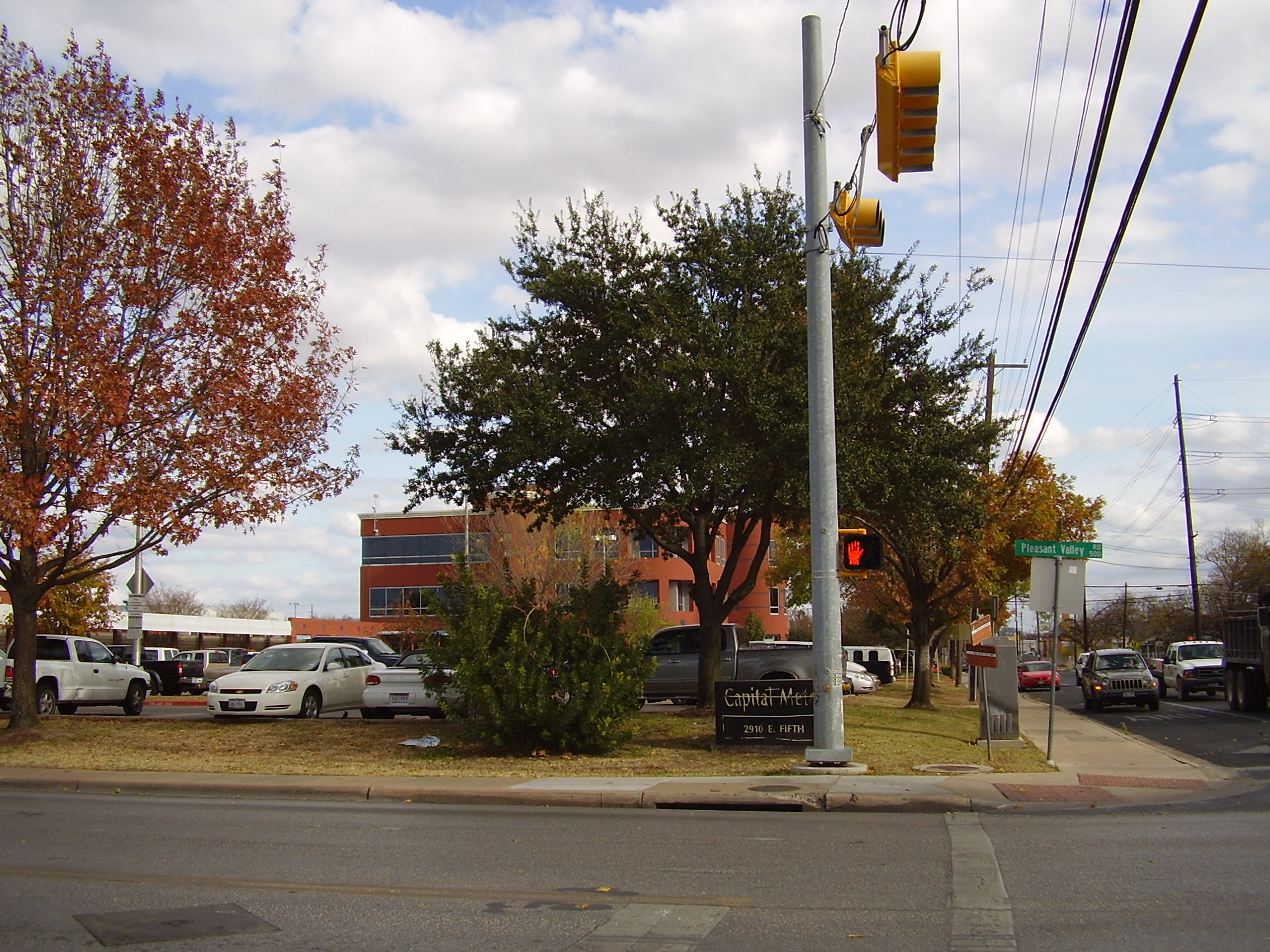
CapMetro headquarter complex

CapMetro was established by a referendum on January 19, 1985, to provide mass transportation service to the greater Austin metropolitan area. Voters in Austin and the surrounding area approved the creation of the agency, to be funded in part by a 1 percent sales tax. CapMetro commenced operations on July 1, 1985, and took over the existing city of Austin bus services in 1986.

In an effort to boost ridership, CapMetro did away with fares completely and instituted fare-free in an experiment that lasted from October 1989 to December 1990. The program was enormously successful in attracting new passengers, and increased ridership by 75% (though expanded service accounted for some of the growth). The fare-free scheme, however, attracted problem riders who drove away quality ridership. In response, 75% of transit drivers voted to have the program discontinued immediately in 1990.

=== Safety and quality issues ===
In 1997, a string of Texas Legislature and FBI investigations uncovered a dysfunctional organization beset by poor management. In an attempt to make the transit authority both more effective and transparent ahead of a performance review by the Texas Comptroller of Public Accounts, the Legislature subsequently overhauled CapMetro and its board of directors. As part of this restructuring, the Legislature ordered CapMetro to hold an up-or-down referendum on passenger rail. In response, CapMetro released an ambitious plan that proposed to spend $1.9 billion for a light rail system with 52 miles of track on existing streets. The referendum was narrowly defeated in November 2000 by 2,000 votes, with voters in central Austin tending to favor it, while those outside the city limits did not.

The Comptroller's review cited an "ongoing criminal investigation" by the FBI, "irresponsible management", "expensive, embarrassing mistakes", "dubious contracting and purchasing practices", and $118,000 spent on "food, parties, and presents for its employees" and culminated with, "We have never, in all of the performance reviews we have conducted, seen an agency with such a lack of accountability."

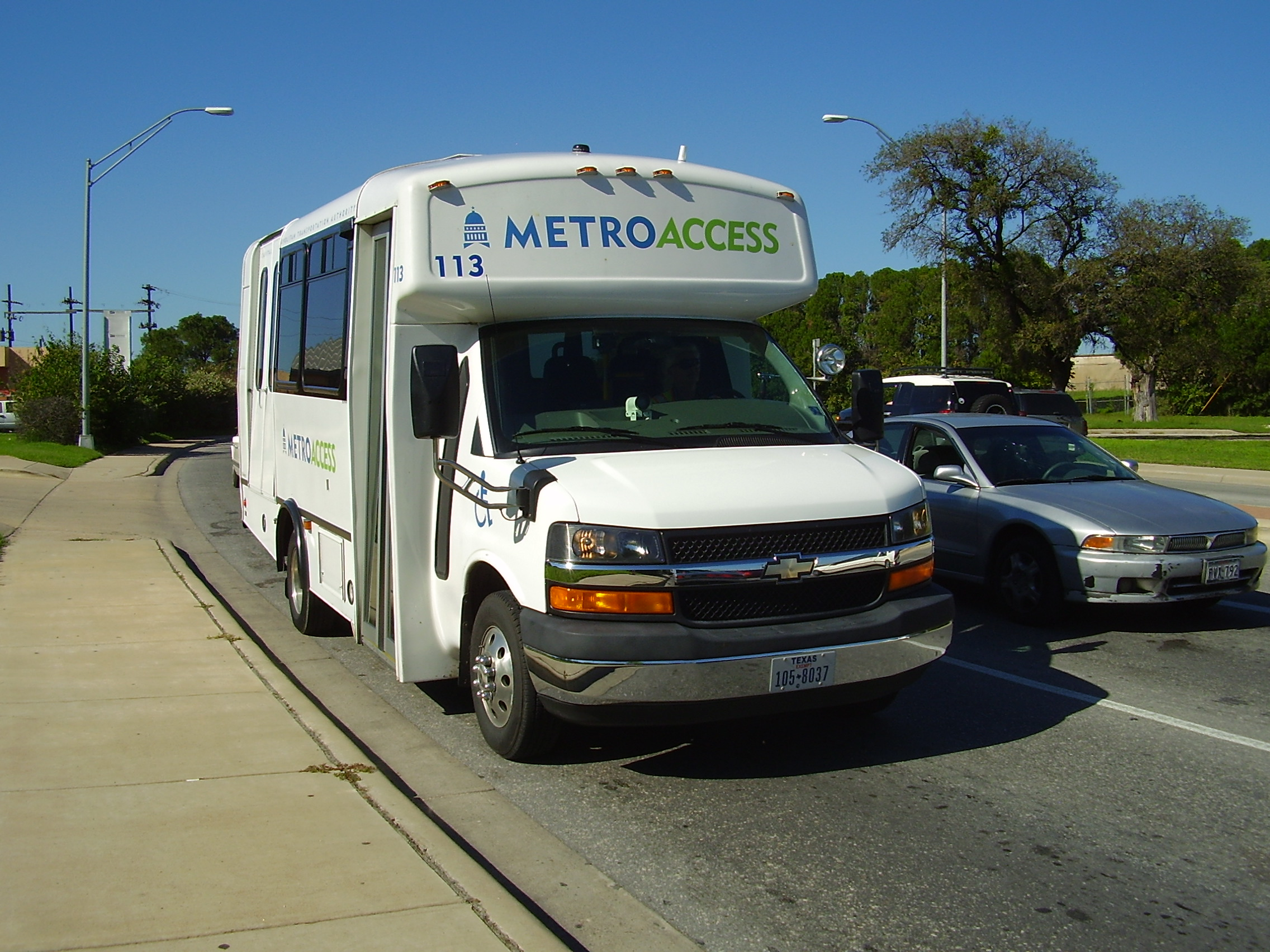
CapMetro Access vehicle

CapMetro subsequently prepared a greatly scaled-back proposed rail system for voters in November 2004. It sought to build just one starter line that would run north–south at a cost of $90 million. While the project was somewhat marred by construction delays, questions and safety and cost overruns, the Red Line of the CapMetro Rail began service on March 22, 2010.

In June 2020, the agency changed or eliminated more than half of all local routes under 'remap'. Riders became concerned by the lack of routes and overcrowding on existing and/or rearranged bus routes. A 2019 survey conducted by Eastside Memorial's student council showed that 70 percent of that student body needed the prior local bus service restored.

CapMetro had its first passenger/bus fatality in its operating history on January 30, 2012, when route 383 operated by Veolia Transportation struck a pedestrian crossing Braker Lane and Jollyville Road. The next fatality happened on January 29, 2019, when a driver struck Anthony John Diaz while he was cycling near the University of Texas campus.

Capital Metro previously used three contractors to run its vehicles. Several passenger injuries were reported on First Transit although they scored higher than StarTran and Veolia, respectively. Veolia Transportation was given a safety review plan 2011. At the beginning of the COVID-19 pandemic in spring 2023, CapMetro scaled back weekday operations to their standard Sunday schedule. UT Shuttles, Night Owl, and Saturday CapMetro Rail services were suspended, rail replacement bus service, route 455 Leander-Lakeline Shuttle, was operated in place of Saturday CapMetro Rail services, and Capmetro added mobile scanners to both rear and back doors on most Bus vehicles to encourage all-door boarding and thereby social distancing. Most services returned to normal in mid-August 2023. In 2023, Capmetro also began a 7.537 million contract with Keolis to oversee fixed-route bus operations and maintenance for MetroRapid and MetroBus services. The contractor also manages the transit agency's current 1,212 bargaining employees along with its 36 operations, safety and general management personnel. A new logo and rebranding campaign received mixed public feedback.

=== The Future ===
CapMetro began bus service to Round Rock in summer 2017. Instead of paying for the services with the 1% sales tax used by CapMetro participating jurisdictions, Round Rock contracted with CapMetro to provide services for set costs. In June 2018, CapMetro began testing driverless buses. If successful, the buses would run for free as part of a 12-month pilot program.

In summer 2018, CapMetro began testing autonomous electric shuttles on Downtown streets. The pilot program tested two driverless bus models from EasyMile and Navya on a route from the Austin Convention Center to the Austin Central Library.

== Funding conflicts ==
The source of CapMetro's funding has been a source of considerable and consistent controversy since the transit authority's founding in 1985. In December 1988, the board of directors voluntarily lowered the sales and use tax to 0.75%. In June 1995, the Board of Directors reinstated the sales and use tax to the full one percent effective October 1, 1995, promising to set aside the additional revenue for funding light rail.

CapMetro, after raising its sale tax from 0.75 percent to 1 percent in 1995, had stockpiled $176 million by the 2000 referendum. When light rail was defeated at the polls in 2000, however, pressure mounted to return the quarter-cent it had been setting aside for rail projects. For years, mass transit detractors had coveted the quarter percentage earmarked for rail projects. Political leaders and organizations, including former Republican state Rep. Terry Keel of Austin, Travis County Commissioner Gerald Daugherty and his anti-rail group Reclaim Our Allocated Dollars (ROAD), wanted the sales-tax money to build projects such as a highway loop around Austin and an east–west freeway. As pressure mounted on CapMetro, Keel announced his intention to roll CapMetro's taxing authority back to a half-cent and redirecting the other half-cent to highway construction.

To head that off and keep rail's future prospects alive, the CapMetro board passed resolutions in the months after the vote making two promises: It would direct $91 million of its existing reserves to local governments for transportation projects, and it would dispense all proceeds that year from a quarter-cent of its tax to those same local governments. That quarter-cent promise was later extended for three more years, eventually amounting to $113 million, for a total of $204 million.

The city of Austin, given that something on the order of 97 percent of CapMetro sales taxes come from within the city, was to be the primary beneficiary of those promises. Since 2000, at least $106 million of the $204 million promised to Austin and smaller cities such as Manor and Leander. At the same time, however, it was spending more than $300 million on commuter rail, park-and-ride lots, a new maintenance and operations center, and other facilities. As the Great Recession spread to Austin in 2009, tax revenues dried up and CapMetro had to stop payment on a $51 million loan owed to Austin as part of a 2001 agreement.

== Member jurisdictions ==
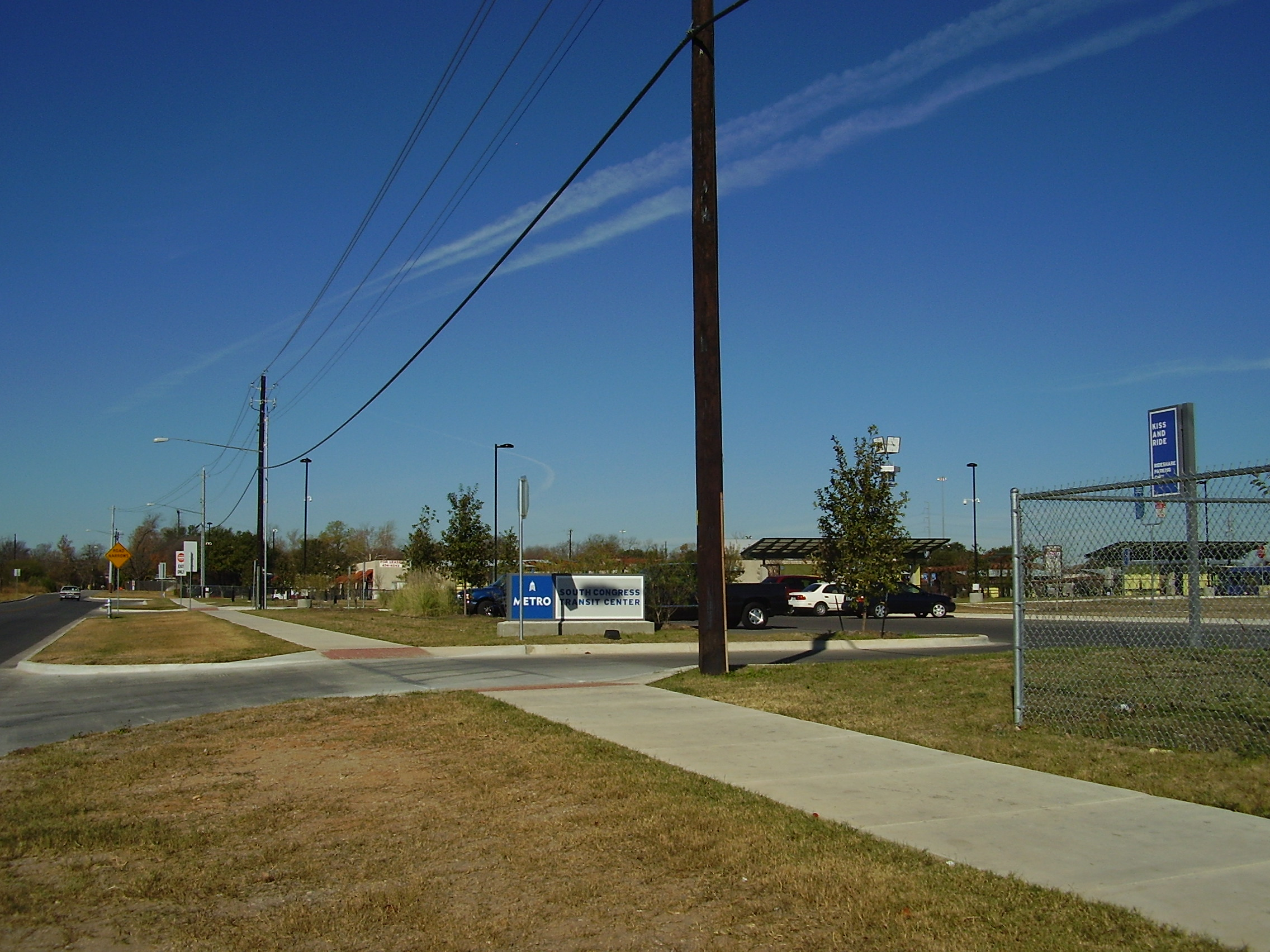
South Congress Transit Center

Seven cities participate in the CapMetro system and pay the associated 1% sales tax. All are in Travis or Williamson Counties:

- Austin
- Jonestown
- Lago Vista
- Leander
- Manor
- Point Venture
- San Leanna

Additionally, two suburban non-city jurisdictions participate: the Anderson Mill area in Williamson County and Precinct 2, an unincorporated area in north Travis County. Service to rural areas in the counties surrounding Austin is provided by the Capital Area Rural Transportation System (CARTS), a federally funded rural transportation agency which interlines with CapMetro at several transit centers.

In 2008, CapMetro voted to approve an interlocal agreement policy that would allow cities or government agencies to hire CapMetro to provide transit service, without requiring the 1% sales tax. The cities of Round Rock, Pflugerville (an original participating jurisdiction which withdrew in 1999), and Georgetown all have established this type of agreement with CapMetro though the exact levels and types of service contracted varies widely between them. Currently only Round Rock has such an agreement.

Several other cities were original CapMetro participants but later withdrew: Cedar Park withdrew in 1999, Rollingwood and West Lake Hills both withdrew in 1988, and Volente withdrew in 2016.

== Services ==
CapMetro began as a bus-only transit system when it inherited the bus services of city-owned Austin Transit System at inception. However, it has since diversified and now operates commuter rail services, paratransit services, bike sharing and a number of other transit modes.

=== Bus services ===
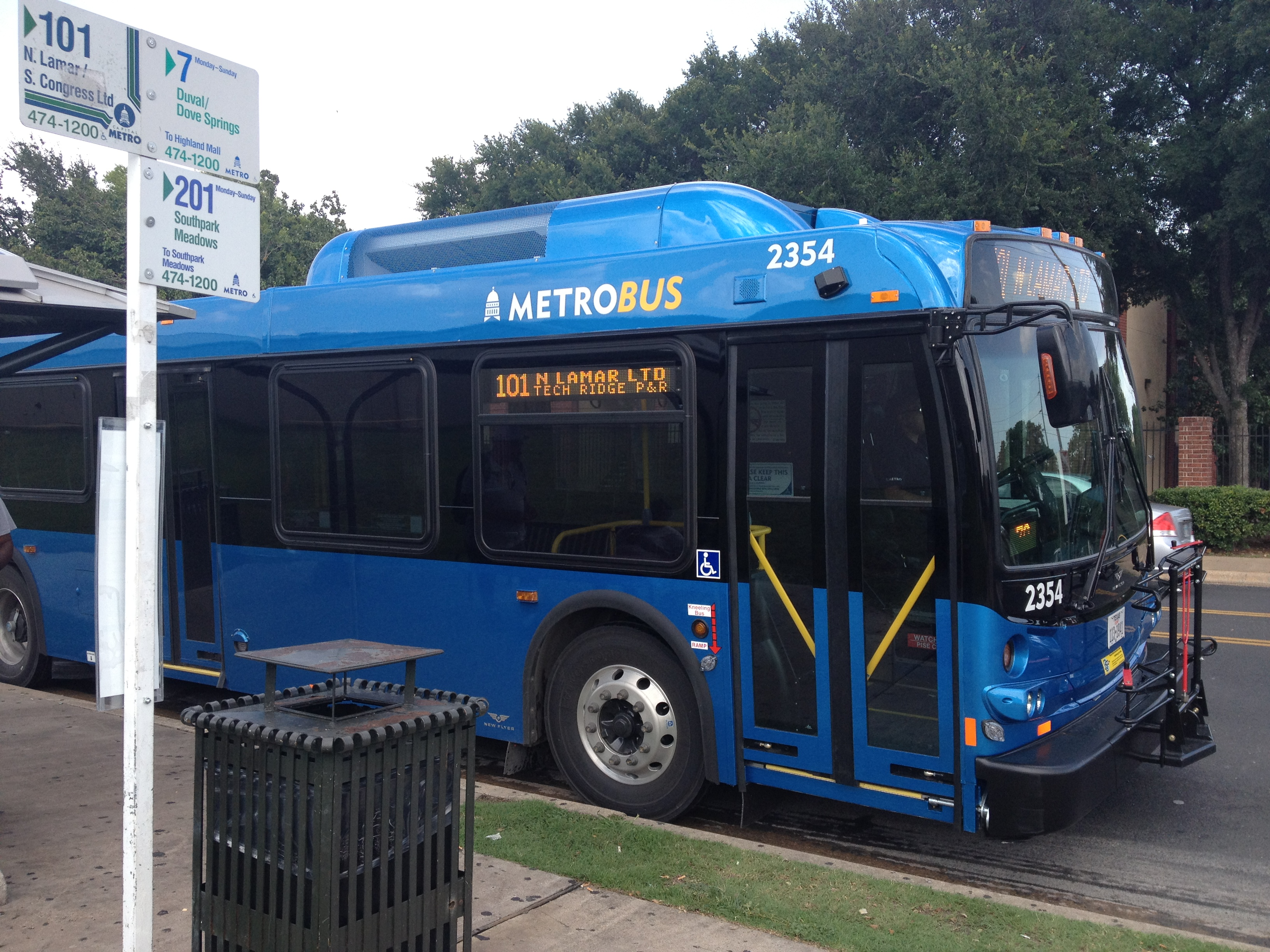
CapMetro Bus

CapMetro's various bus services, which include express bus, bus rapid transit, and university shuttle systems, are by far the agency's most used services representing over 16.6 million of the agency's total 17.8 million boardings in fiscal year 2020. While the majority of bus routes operate within Capital Metro's jurisdictional area, the agency has contracts with cities and organizations to provide services outside its core service area.

==== CapMetro Bus ====
CapMetro's core fixed route bus service, CapMetro Bus, includes 82 standard routes and 15 high-frequency bus routes as of August 2021. It has several primary categories of routes: Local (Routes 1-99), Flyer (Routes 100–199), Feeder (Routes 200–299), and Crosstown (Routes 300–399). CapMetro Busalso provides contract service to the Austin suburb of Round Rock (Routes 50 and 152) and the University of Texas at Austin UT Shuttle services (Routes 600–699). In addition to its standard and high-frequency routes, CapMetro Bus runs a variety of special service routes (Routes 400–499) including Night Owl overnight buses and E-Bus entertainment-district services among others.

==== CapMetro Express ====
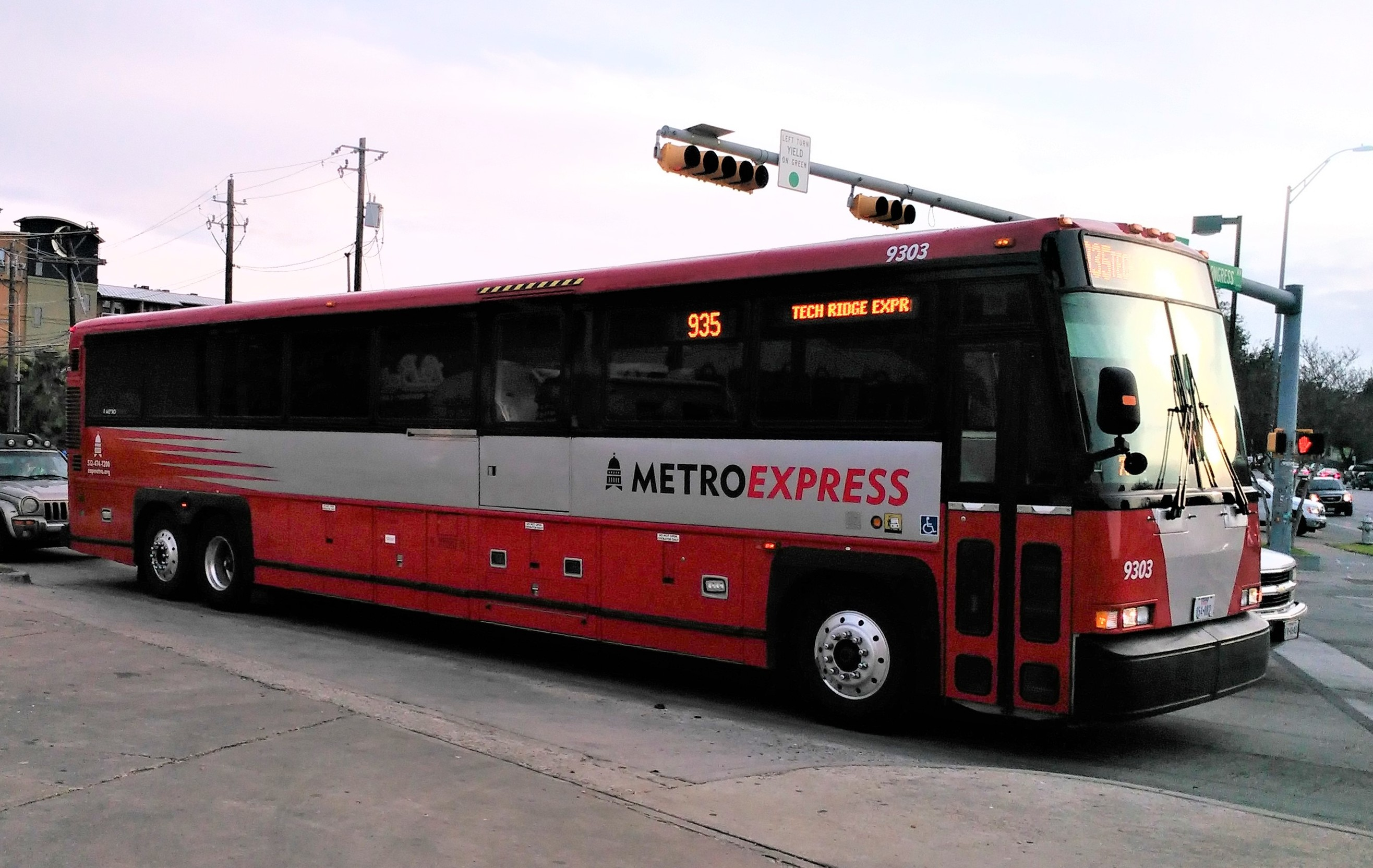
CapMetro Express bus in 2012

CapMetro Express services are limited stop bus services that run between Downtown Austin and the far suburbs. Express routes are designated as routes 900–999 and are served by buses in the red Express livery (though on occasions they may be served by buses in the regular CapMetro Bus livery as well).

==== CapMetro Rapid ====
In January 2014, CapMetro launched a bus rapid transit service branded MetroRapid, utilizing articulated buses operating in shared lanes with automobile traffic. Service on the first route, CapMetro Rapid North Lamar/South Congress (Route 801), began on January 26, 2014. It replaced existing bus Routes 1L and 1M, as well as the 101 Express, which traveled along the same corridor.

A second route, CapMetro Rapid Burnet/South Lamar (Route 803), serves a total of 24 stations between The Domain and Westgate. Both the 801 and 803 drew citizen protest until premium fares were discontinued in 2017 and the 801 had also reduced frequency of the then operating 1L/1M. The routes were rebranded CapMetro Rapid in 2023.

==== UT Shuttles ====
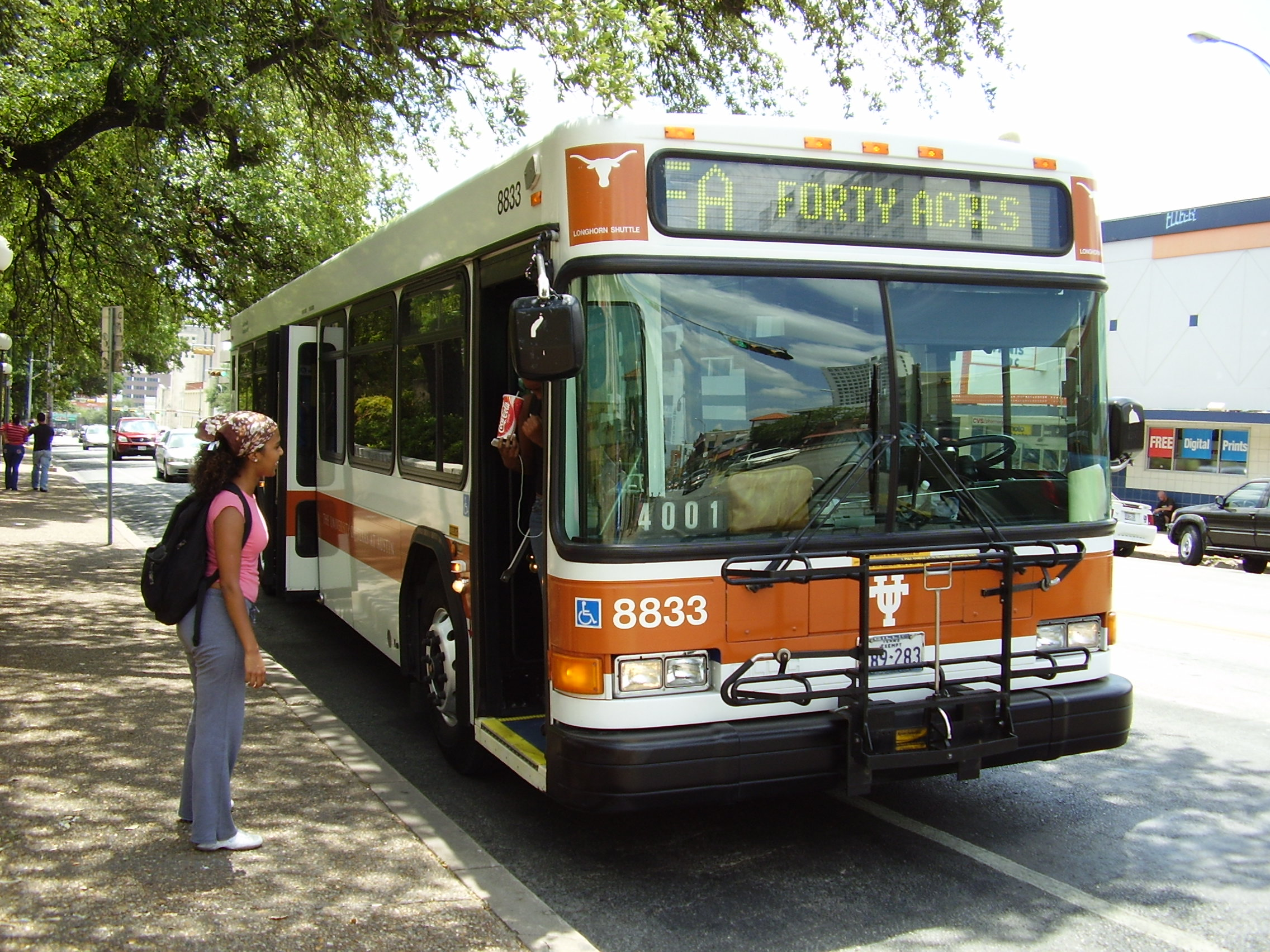
CapMetro Bus in now-retired University of Texas at Austin livery

Since 1989 when it took over operations from the previous, private operators, CapMetro has operated the University of Texas at Austin's UT Shuttle system. The system is one of the largest university transit systems in the United States and carries over 5.2 million passengers a year. The UT Shuttle network is open to the public, but UT students, faculty, and staff receive free transportation on it as well as on all standard CapMetro Bus services. Other passengers pay standard CapMetro Bus fares. UT Shuttle services are seasonal, varying along with the university's schedule.

=== CapMetro Rail ===
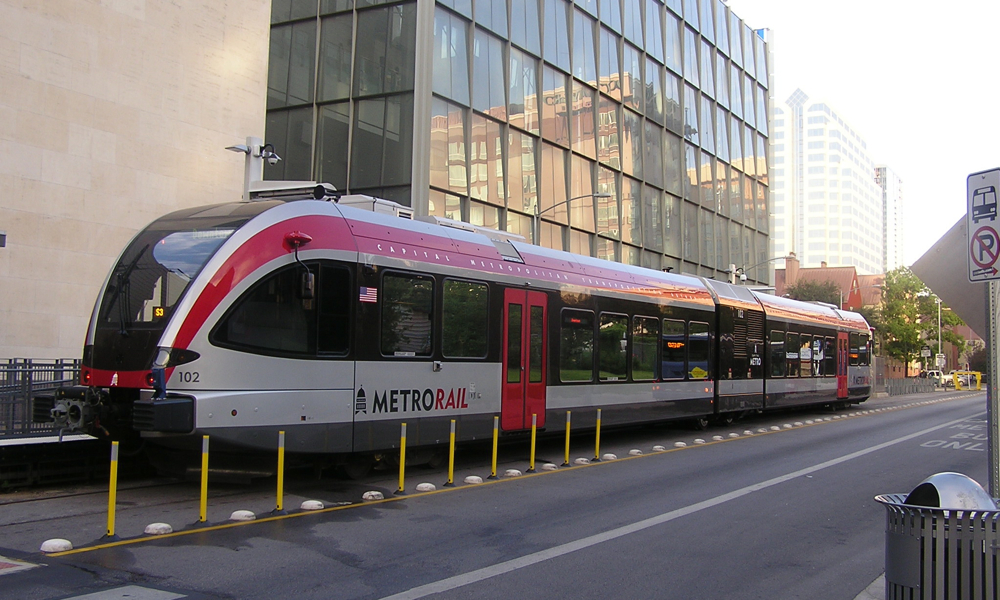
CapMetro Rail train at Downtown Station

CapMetro's CapMetro Rail provides commuter rail services on a single 9-station, 32-mile route, named the Red Line in anticipation of additional rail line development. CapMetro Rail operates the line with 10 diesel-electric rail cars from downtown Austin through the north central and northwest areas of the city to Leander, a suburb to Austin's northwest. Since CapMetro began operating the rail service in 2010, the agency has made significant investments in upgrades to the line, a pre-existing freight line that still carries freight outside passenger operating hours, and facilities including an expanded Downtown station which opened in October 2020. The system was rebranded CapMetro Rail in 2023.

In November 2020, Austin voters approved CapMetro's Project Connect transit development proposal which includes a significant expansion of rail services. The proposal was initially expected to produce an additional commuter rail line, the Green Line, as well as two light rail lines, the Blue and Orange Lines. This investment is on top of already-approved spending on two new stations for the Red Line. By mid 2023, the light rail portion had been scaled back amid rising costs — the Downtown Tunnel was eliminated in lieu of a surface route which had been truncated in length.

=== Other services ===
In addition to its core bus and rail operations, CapMetro operates several additional services:

- CapMetro Pickup, a low-cost, on-demand rideshare service introduced in 2017. The service is only available in certain areas, primarily those not otherwise covered by CapMetro Bus services. Pickup vehicles are wheelchair accessible and act as a complement to the agency's CapMetro Access service.
- CapMetro Bike, a regular and electric bike-share system in Austin as well as a network of private bike parking and shelters at CapMetro transit centers. The bike-share service was initially introduced as Austin BCycle in 2013 owned by the City of Austin as a franchise of the BCycle national bike sharing network owned by Trek Bicycle. In September 2020, CapMetro took partial ownership with the remainder still owned by the city. Austin BCycle was rebranded MetroBike, the existing brand for CapMetro's bike shelter and parking network. Bike Share of Austin, a local nonprofit, has run daily operations since the bike-share system's introduction.
- CapMetro RideShare, a vanpool service providing month-to-month passenger van leases for groups of 5-12 people.
- CapMetro Access, a door-to-door paratransit service for people with ADA-eligible disabilities. Riders must be certified by CapMetro as having an eligible disability and live within three-quarters of a mile of a CapMetro bus route or rail station.
- Freight rail services are offered on the agency's approximately 162 miles of railroad right of way between Giddings and Llano, only a portion of which is used for the CapMetro Rail passenger service. Since 2015, CapMetro Freight Rail operations have been sub-contracted to Austin Western Railroad, a subsidiary of short-line rail operator Watco.

== Fare structure ==
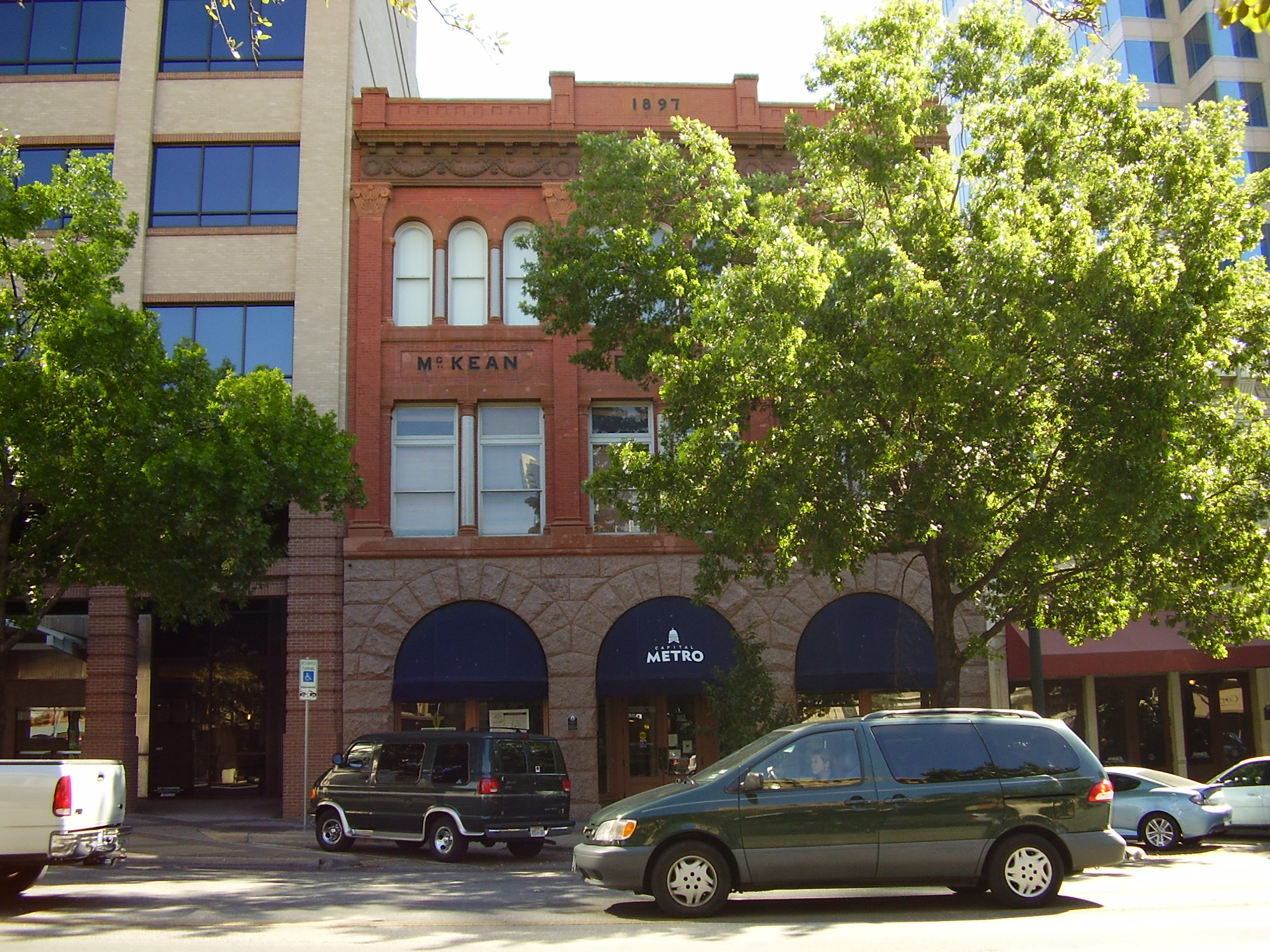
The former CapMetro Public Information and Fare Office in the McKean-Eilers Building in Downtown Austin

CapMetro operates routes using three different fare classes:

- Local: CapMetro Bus, UT Shuttle, CapMetro Rapid, and Pickup
- Commuter: Local services plus CapMetro Express and CapMetro Rail
- Access: CapMetro Access services only except for monthly passes, which cover all services

Several groups are eligible for Reduced Fare IDs issued by CapMetro entitling them to a discount of half the listed price for fares: seniors 65 and over, Medicare card holders, persons with disabilities, students 6–18 with valid school identification, and active and reserve military with valid ID. No fare is charged for children under 6 accompanied by an adult and emergency or military personnel in uniform. The University of Texas, Austin Community College, and City of Austin employees have contracts established with CapMetro entitling students, faculty, and staff to ride all CapMetro services for no charge with valid identification.

Fares can be paid with a physical pass card, QR code or digital ticket on cell phones, or NFC chip-enabled tickets. Except for CapMetro Rail, all services require riders to present a valid pass, ticket, or equivalent upon boarding. CapMetro Rail operates on a proof-of-payment system.

== Finances and governance ==
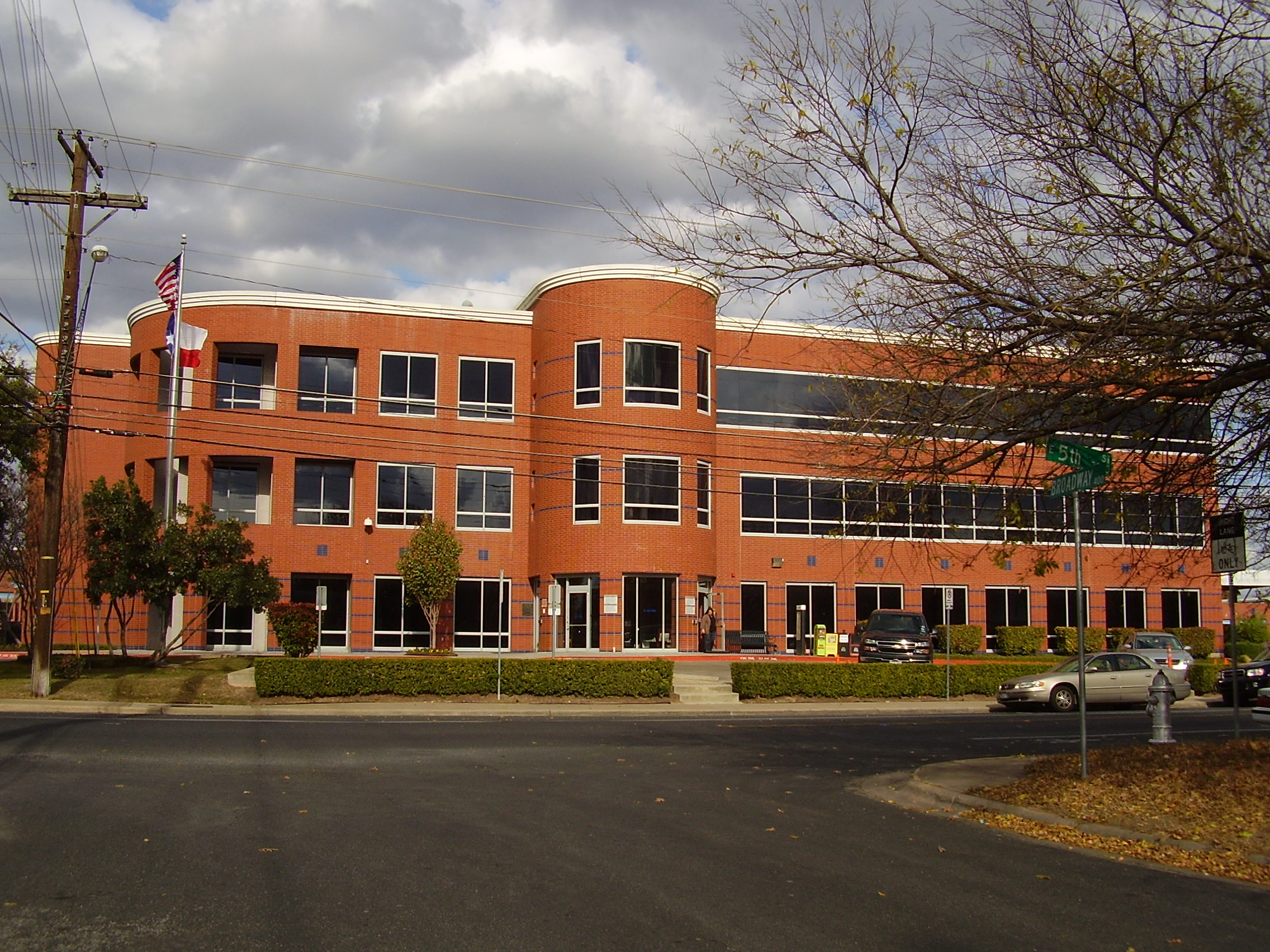
CapMetro headquarter building

=== Board of directors ===
In 2010 the total number of board members was increased from seven to eight. The Texas Legislature also reduced the number of elected officials who are required to serve on the board and instituted new requirements regarding the professional experience of certain appointees. The board consists of three members appointed by the Capital Area Metropolitan Planning Organization, including an elected official; one member representing the small cities in CapMetro's service area; a member each appointed by the Travis County Commissioners and Williamson County commissioners; and two members appointed by the Austin City Council, in which one must be a member of the Austin City Council.

=== Labor relations ===
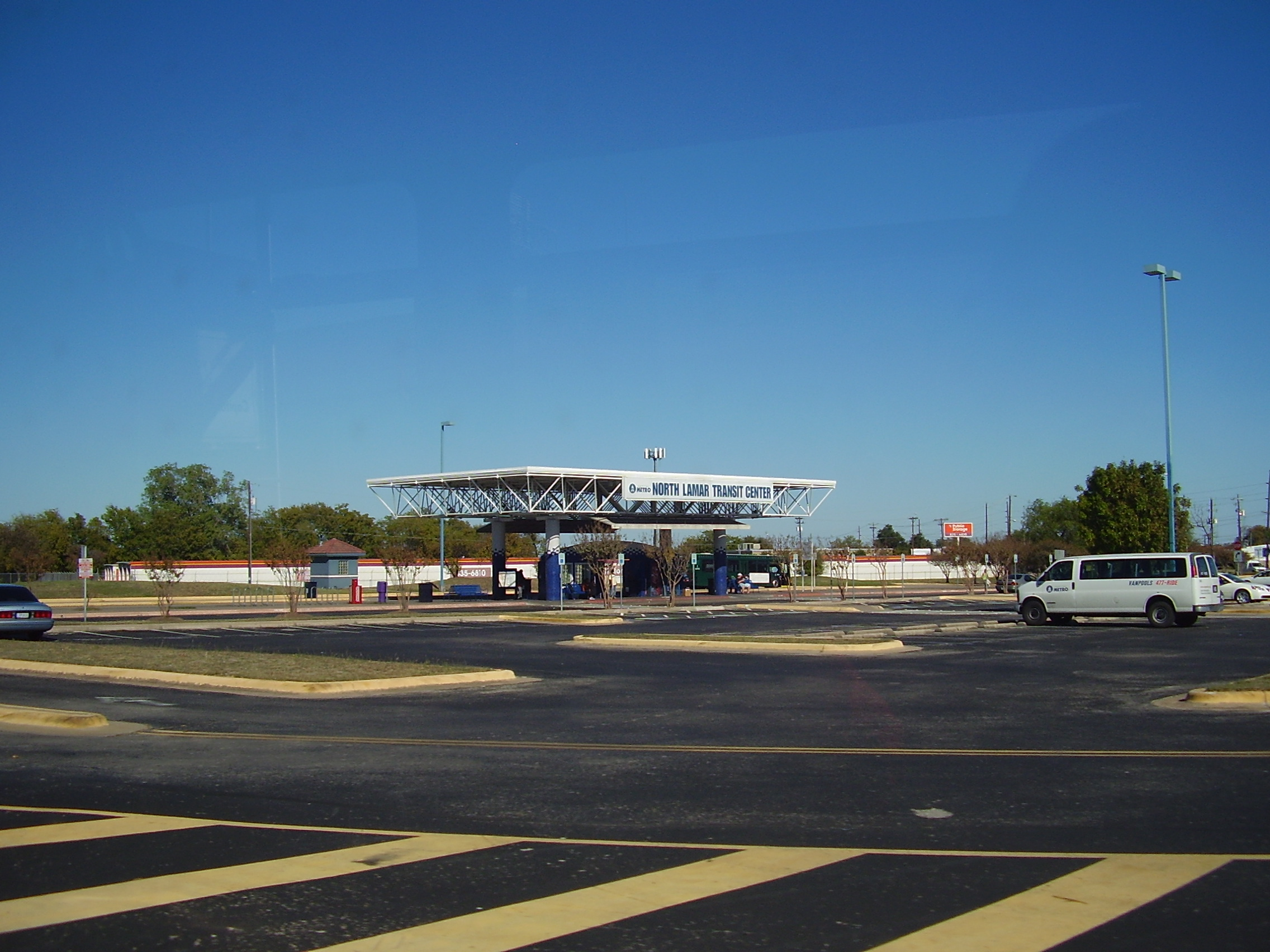
North Lamar Transit Center

As a public entity, CapMetro is prohibited by Texas law from entering into a traditional collective bargaining agreement with a labor union in the United States. In 1991, however, to comply fully with a state law prohibiting public entities from supervising unionized employees with collective bargaining rights, the CapMetro board determined that its unionized employees and their supervisors should be transferred to a separate non-profit company.

In January 1992, CapMetro created StarTran Inc., a private entity that acts as the authority's agent in managing its unionized workforce. Metro drivers and mechanics are instead represented by the Amalgamated Transit Union, a major labor union representing workers in the transit system that boasts over 188,000 members representing workers. StarTran and the ATU have in the past had troubled contract negotiations, that most recently resulted in a general strike in November 2008.

In 2008, StarTran voted to begin a general strike, despite the fact that StarTran employees were already the highest paid bus operators in the state. Beginning on November 5, 2008, the strike caused the transit agency to reduce its fixed and paratransit service levels, particularly impacting Austin residents who had to use public transit. During the strike, the agency initially provided only those routes on the contingency map for a reduced number of hours but added others as resources became available. The Sunset Advisory Commission released its report on CapMetro in April 2010.

CapMetro formerly contracted with First Transit, Veolia Transport, but still uses the Capital Area Rural Transportation System (CARTS).

=== Budget and ridership ===
Budget FY2020 and FY2019 (millions USD)
	2020	2019
Operating revenue	$23.0	$29.4
Passenger fares	$10.0	$15.2
Contract fares	$6.5	$9.1
Freight rail	$6.5	$5.1
Operating expenses	$303.5	$292.2
Operating loss	($280.5)	($262.8)
Non-operating revenue (expense)	$373.0	$298.2
Income before contributions	$92.4	$35.4
Capital contributions	$21.4	$19.2
Change in net position	$113.8	$54.6

Ridership by service FYs 2019/2020 (thousands) (Note: Fiscal Year runs Oct 1 – Sep 30)
Service	Type	2019	2020
CapMetro Bus	Bus	21,271	12,343
CapMetro Rapid	BRT	5,134	2,875
CapMetro Express	Express bus	755	393
CapMetro Access	Paratransit	702	370
UT Shuttles	Bus	1,923	1,028
MetroRideShare	Vanpool	554	342
CARTS	Bus	43	22
CARTS – Express	Express bus	25	12
CapMetro Rail	Commuter rail	730	326
Innovative Mobility (Note: Includes Pickup services and MetroBike)	Various	6	58
Special Events/ Charters	Various	97	49
Totals		31,240	17,819

== Future expansion ==
Plans have been circulating since a failed light rail vote in 2000 on urban rail in Austin. A vote on urban rail, a light rail or a streetcar system, was initially planned to be put to the voters as early as 2012. The light rail expansion plan was presented to voters but failed in 2014.

In November 2020, Project Connect was approved by voters on the 2020 election ballot. The plan calls for 2 new light rail lines, 1 new bus rapid transit line (which could be converted to light rail in the future), 1 new commuter rail line, new CapMetro Rapid bus routes, new regional park and rides, as well as last mile infrastructure investments.

== See also ==
- Texas Department of Transportation
- Dallas Area Rapid Transit
- Metropolitan Transit Authority of Harris County
