= Capital Area Rural Transportation System =

Public transportation system in Texas

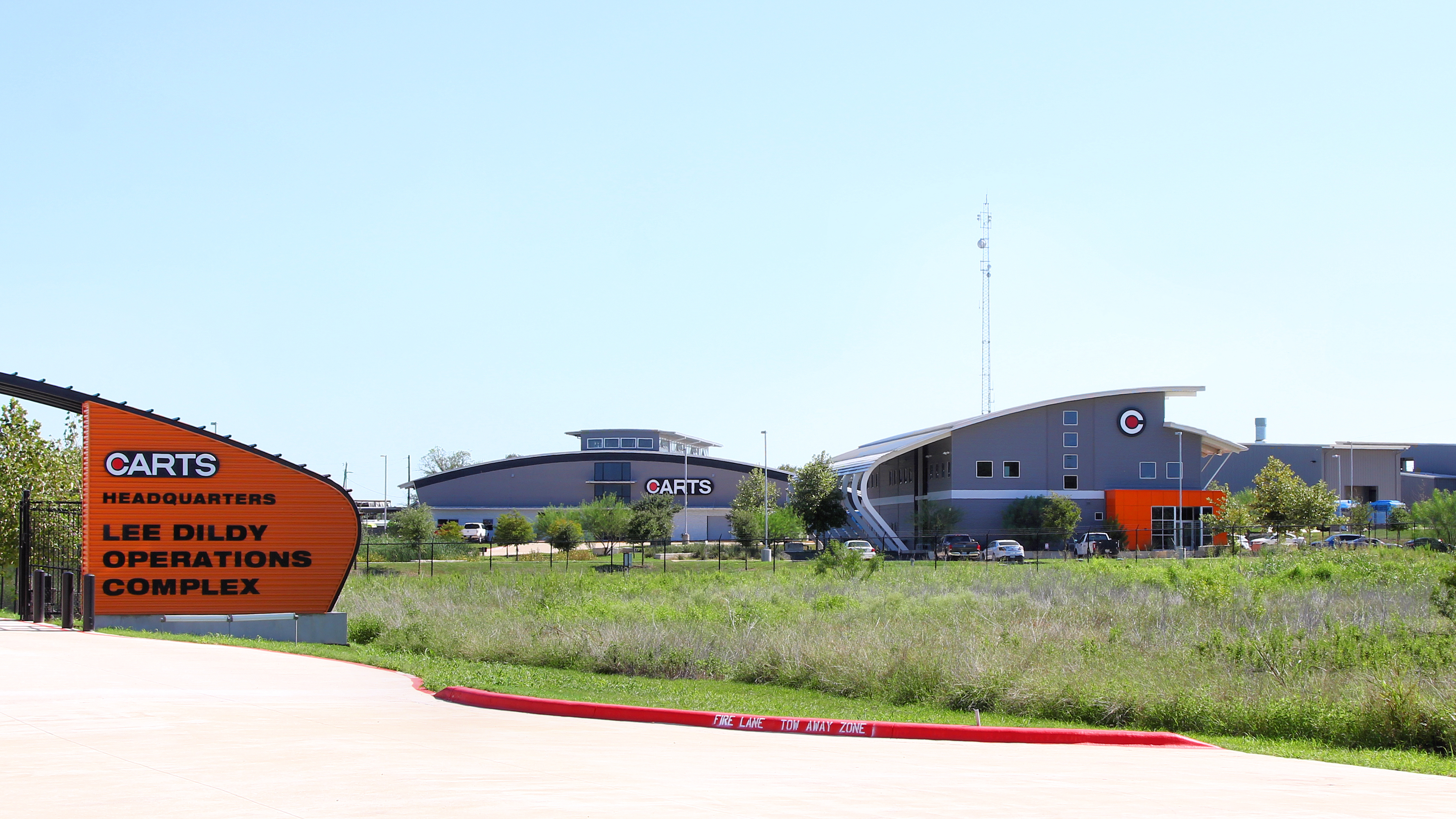
CARTS operations complex in Cedar Creek, Texas

Capital Area Rural Transportation System (CARTS) is a public transportation service based in Central Texas, United States. It provides transit services to several counties including Bastrop, Blanco, Burnet, Caldwell, Fayette, and Lee, as well as rural areas in Hays, Travis, and Williamson counties. As of 2008, CARTS serves a total of 169 communities across these regions.
