= The Domain (Austin, Texas) =

Coordinates: 30.401233°N 97.72626°W

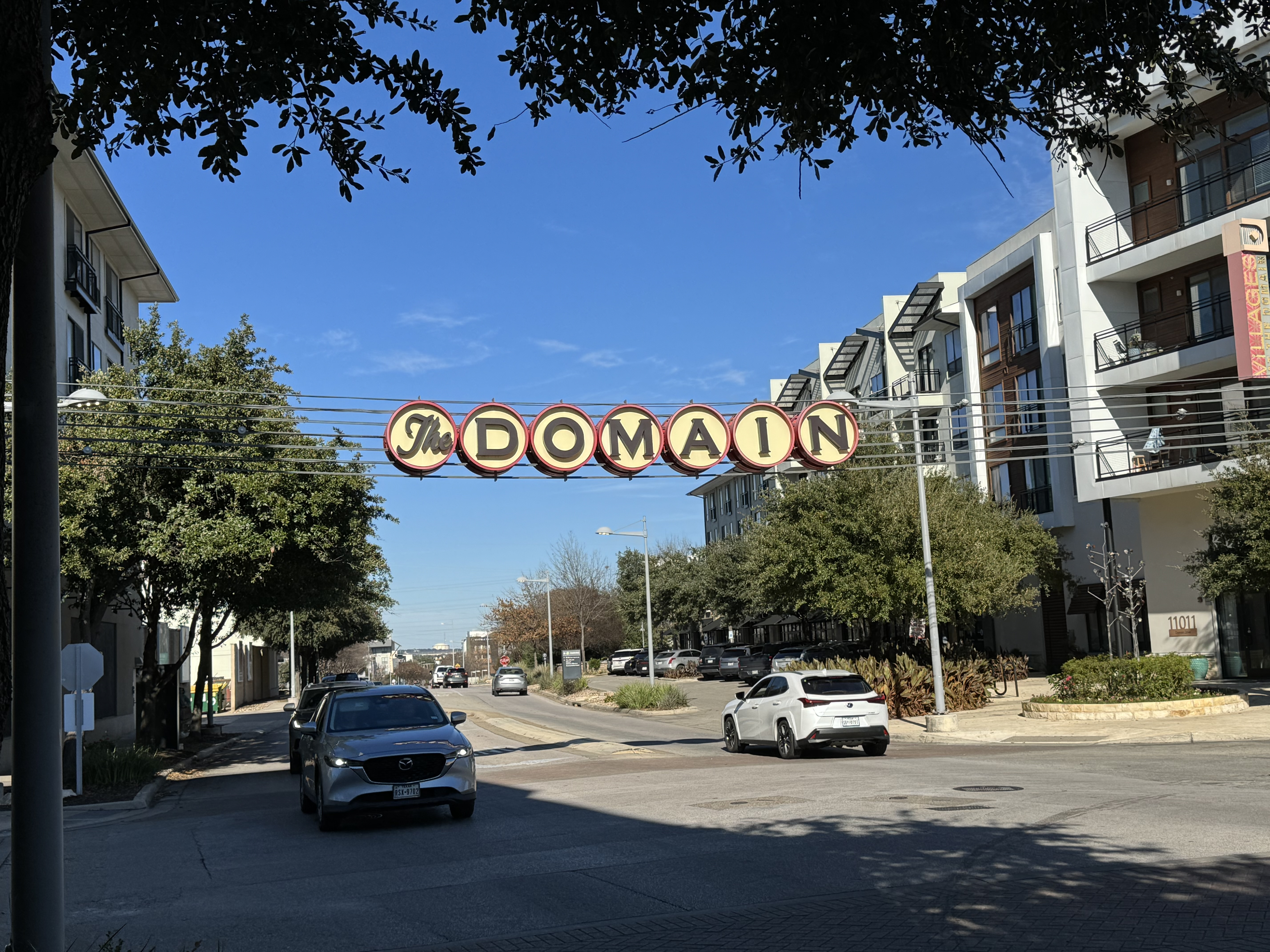
- Location: Austin, Texas, United States
- Opened: March 9, 2007; 19 years ago
- Manager: Simon Property Group, Endeavor Real Estate Group
- Owner: Simon Property Group
- Num. of stores: 137 (including committed tenants)
- Num. of anchor tenants: 4
- Floor area: 1,234,352 square feet (114,675.1 m^{2})
- Floors: Variable; most tenants single-story (2 in Arhaus Furniture, Macy's, Neiman Marcus, and Nordstrom, 3 in Dillard's, 4 in Parking Garages)
- Public transit: Kramer station
- Website: Official website

The Domain is a high-density office, retail, and residential center in northwest Austin, Texas, United States that has been described as being "Austin's second downtown." It primarily consists of 5-over-1 construction. The initial phase of the project was completed in March 2007.

It is owned and operated by Endeavor Real Estate Group, Cousins Properties, Simon Property Group, and Stonelake Capital Partners. It is bordered on the west by Union Pacific Railroad, on the west and north by Loop 1, on the south by Braker Lane, and on the east by Burnet Road.

As of April 2022, The Domain has more than 5,000 apartment units and about 3.5 million square feet of office space.

== Site history ==
On December 10, 1966, IBM unveiled its intentions to build a 200,000 sqft manufacturing plant for the IBM Selectric typewriter on the land that currently houses The Domain. The plant opened on July 31, 1967 with 500 employees.

In July 1989, after three decades of expansion in Austin, IBM announced its intentions to build 1 million sqft of office space east of Burnet Rd on the property now known as Uptown ATX. By this time IBM occupied 543 acres and had more than 7,000 employees in Austin, the majority of which worked on the IBM PS/2.

In December 1999, IBM sold off 235 acres of land that would eventually become The Domain for US$60 million and leased back more than half of the 2.5 million sqft office space that the property by then had. An additional 70 acres came from Multech (whose land had been purchased from IBM in 1997). Buying the land was Endeavor Real Estate Group with the financial assistance from Blackstone Group and JER Partners. The initial plan had been to create a campus for the dot-com industry but those plans fell through when the dot-com bubble burst.

In 2003, the Simon Property Group and the Endeavor Real Estate Group entered into a collaborative partnership to develop Phase I of The Domain's retail area. 2004 saw the demolition of Century Oaks Park, a multi-purpose recreational facility for IBM employees and their families, and the start of construction on the initial 57 acres (23 ha) Domain: Phase I.

Additional land for The Domain was reclaimed from vacant IBM manufacturing and administrative buildings, as well as driveways and parking lots that were once part of the original IBM campus.

The developers were granted tax subsidies in 2003 from the City of Austin and Travis County. Total developer compensation is a maximum of a net present value of $25 million. The developer keeps 80 percent of the city's sales tax for the first five years and 50 percent for the next 15 years. Plus, 25 percent of the property tax is rebated back to the developer for the entire 20-year period. The city of Austin expects to take in about $40 million in sales and property taxes over the 20 years of the incentive agreement.

== First phase ==
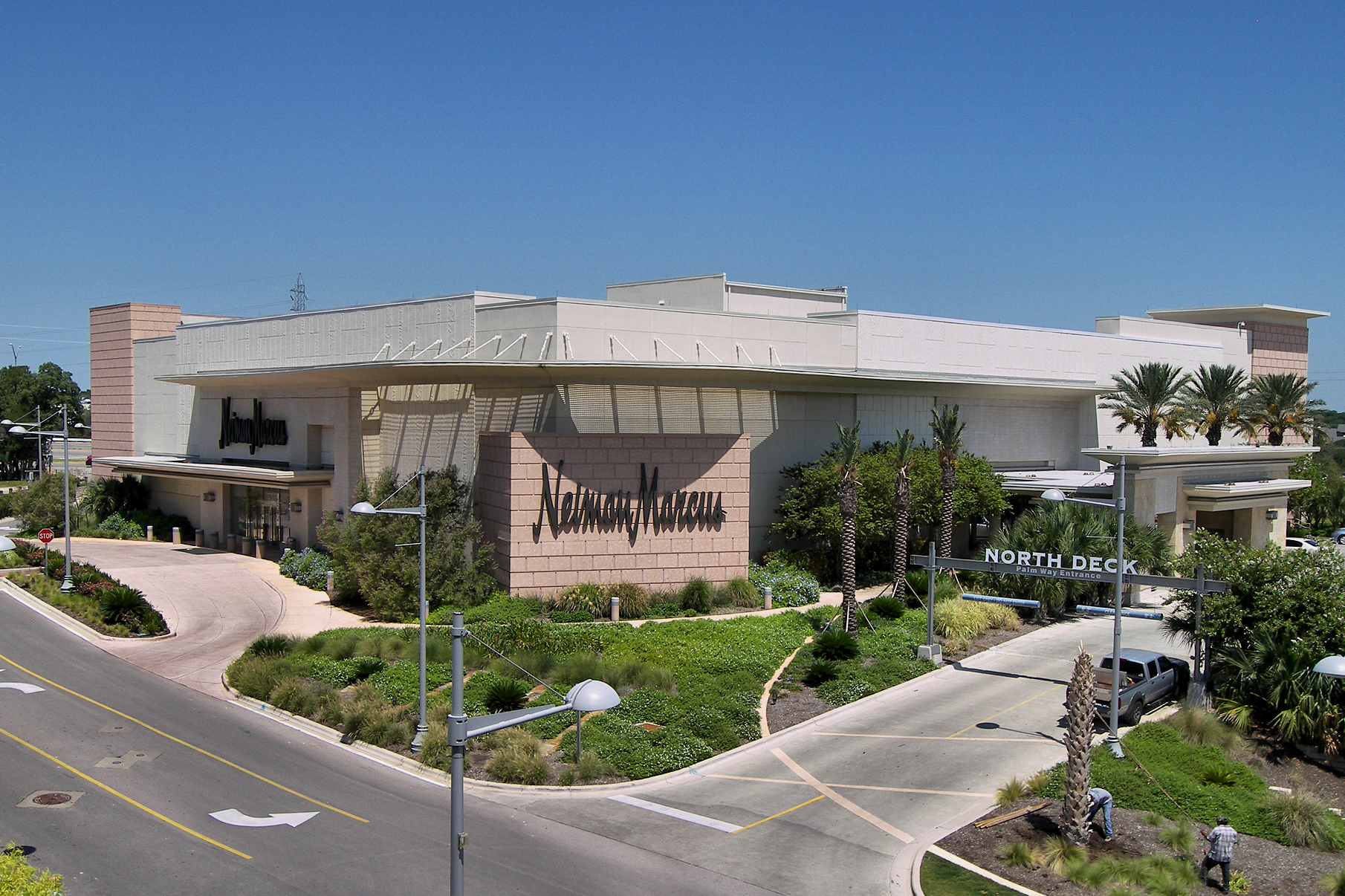
The Neiman Marcus store in the first phase on The Domain

The first phase of the project, The Domain, opened on March 9, 2007, and includes 700,000 square feet (65,000 m^{2}) of restaurants, office space, upscale retail stores, apartments, and a hotel. The retail portion of the project attracted many retailers and restaurants new to the Austin market. An 80,000 sq ft (7,400 m^{2}). Neiman Marcus and a Macy's anchor (with Macy's fulfilling an earlier commitment by Foley's), along with 70 specialty stores, including an Apple Store, a Barneys New York CO-OP store, Burberry, Victoria's Secret, Tiffany & Co., BCBG Max Azria, Calypso Christiane Celle, Anne Fontaine, Lacoste, Lilly Pulitzer, Betty Sport, and a Microsoft Store. The shopping center notably was also one of the short list of locations containing outlets for two new store concepts — Abercrombie & Fitch Co.'s RUEHL 925, targeting affluent young professionals, and American Eagle Outfitters' adventure-oriented Martin + Osa. Both of those stores had closed as of late 2010, and have become locations for Anthropologie (in the former Ruehl location), and Lids (in the former Martin + Osa location). Restaurants included McCormick & Schmick's, Fleming's, Daily Grill, Jasper's, Kona Grill, The Steeping Room, and California Pizza Kitchen.

== Second phase and additional expansion ==
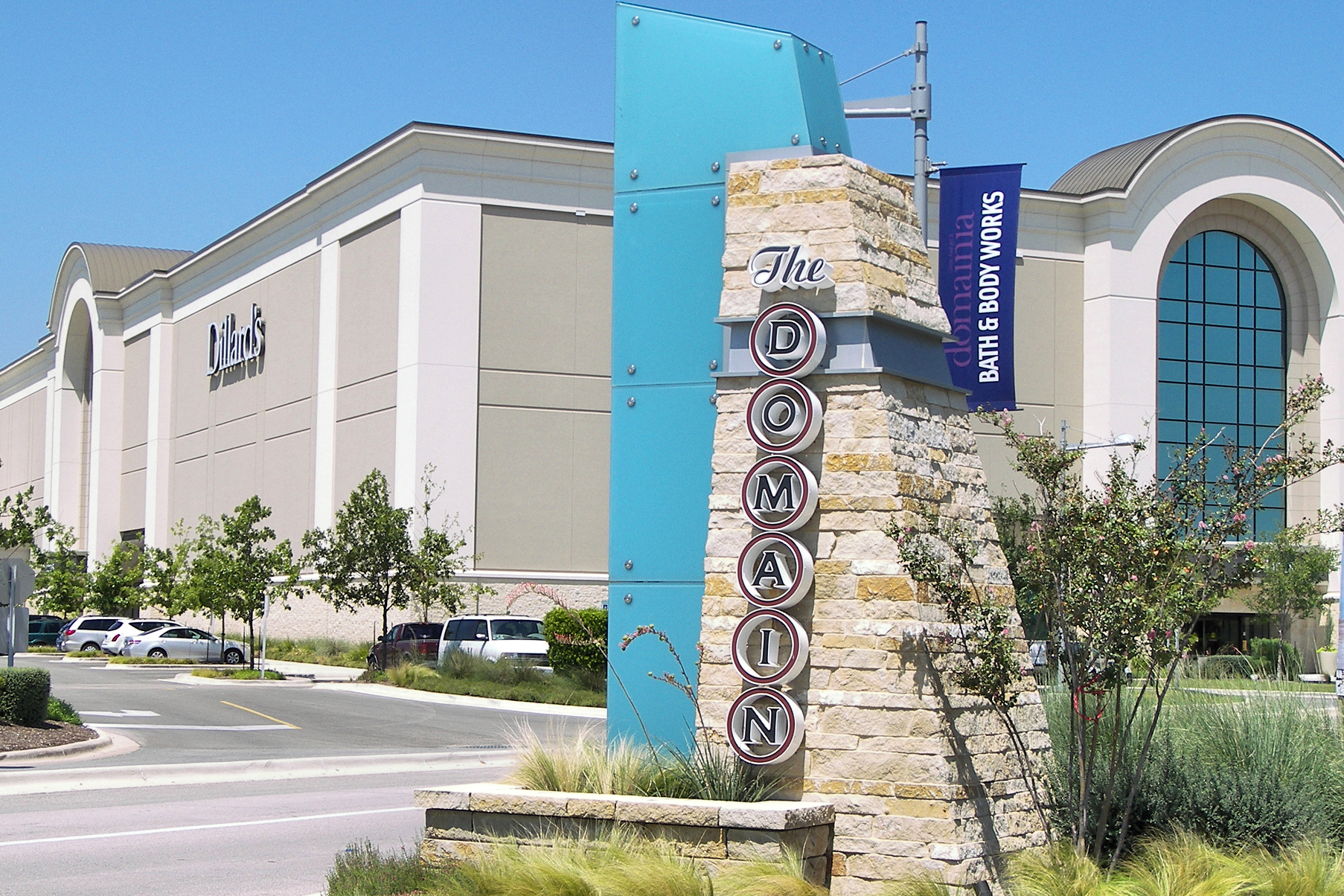
Phase two of The Domain shopping center is anchored by Dillard's.

After the Simon Property Group acquired the 45 acres (18 ha) property that would become The Domain II (Domain Crossing) they bought Endeavor's portion of The Domain I. This second phase, located directly south of The Domain, opened in 2016.

Domain Crossing added an additional 350,000 square feet (33,000 m^{2}) of retail stores, restaurants, and apartments, as well as a theater - Gold Class Cinema - and other entertainment options.

Simon Property Group announced that a 200,000 sq ft (19,000 m^{2}), three-story Dillard's would open during spring 2009 in the primary portion of the project. Nordstrom signed a letter of intent for a two-story, 149,000-square-foot (13,800 m^{2}) store to open in The Domain's phase III. Saks Fifth Avenue also signed a letter of intent for Phase III.

Whole Foods opened a 55,000 square feet (5,100 m^{2}) square foot location in The Domain in January 2014.

Simon Property Group opened up a "great lawn venue" in Phase 2 that hosts live bands from 6 to 9pm on weekends, and food trucks.

== Third phase ==
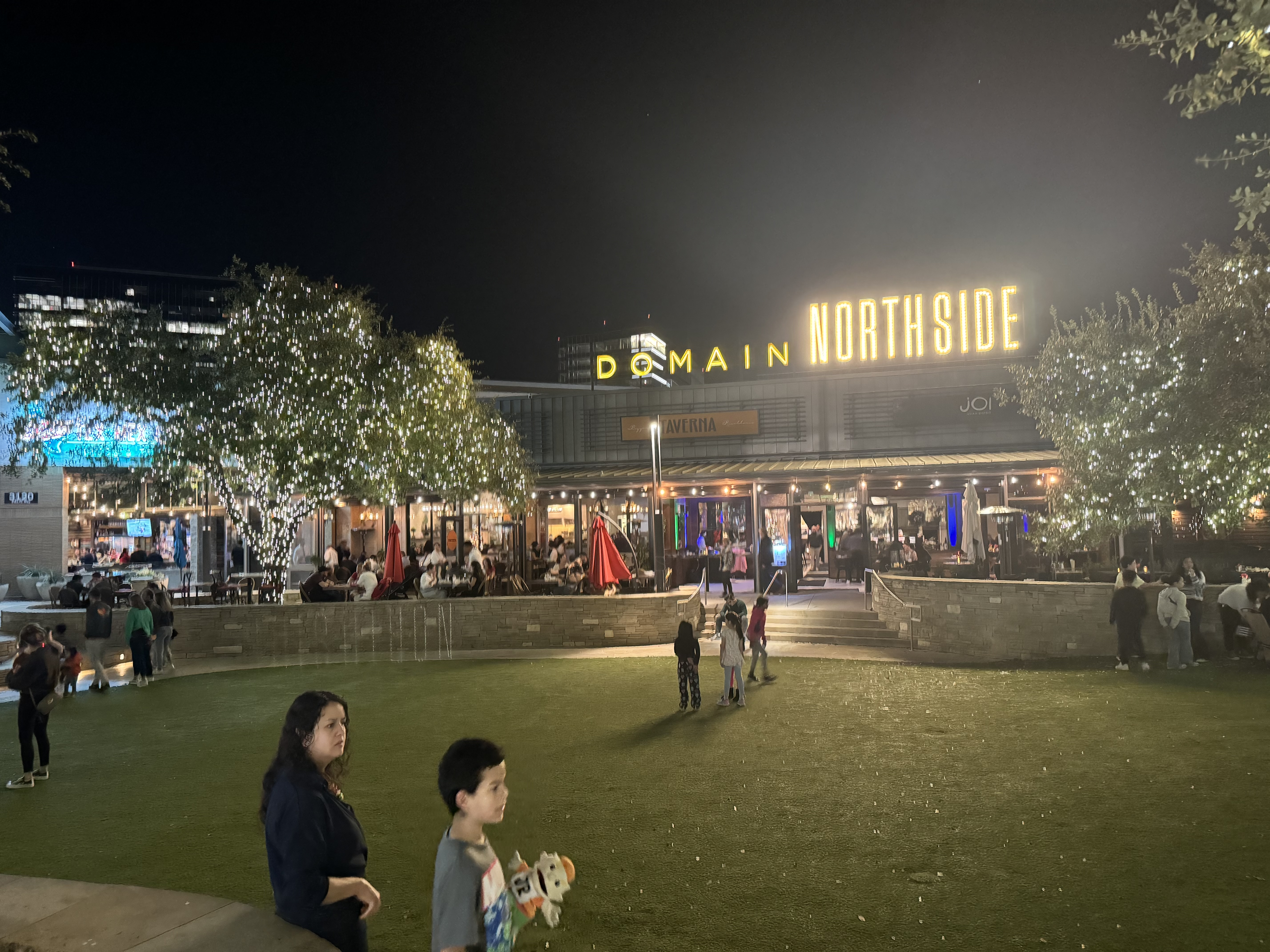
The Domain Northside, in its Third Phase.

The Domain's third phase consists of 1.4 million square feet of retail, residential and hotel space. Included in this space is Endeavor's final retail phase in The Domain, including Domain NORTHSIDE and Rock Rose, a district mostly populated by local businesses. Some specific tenants include CB2, AT&T, Nordstrom, Apple, Restoration -Hardware, Archer Hotel Austin, Salvation Pizza, The Dogwood, Sainte Genevieve, Viva Day Spa, East Side King, Lavaca Street Bar, Kung Fu Saloon and Birds Barbershop. Phase 3 will bring the total number of residential units to over 3,000 units, with the ultimate goal to bring the total number to 5,000.

Dallas-based TIER REIT, Inc. (NYSE: TIER) owns and operates the majority of the office space offered at The Domain, including Domain 2 (115,000 square feet), Domain 3 (179,000 square feet), Domain 4 (153,000 square feet), Domain 7 (222,000 square feet) and a 50% interest in Domain 8 (291,000 square feet), which was delivered in 1 Q'2017 at 98% leased. In addition, TIER REIT owns over 18 acres of fully entitled land at The Domain that can accommodate an additional 1.3 million square feet of future office space. On June 23, 2017, TIER REIT announced that it was commencing development on Domain 11, a 16-story Class A office development. Construction is scheduled to begin shortly, with a late-2018 targeted delivery date. The building will encompass approximately 324,000 square feet. Austin-based Endeavor Real Estate Group owns the Domain 1 and Domain 5 office buildings.

Endeavor continued to own Domain NORTHSIDE until mid 2019 when it sold Domain NORTHSIDE to Northwood Retail, whilst Simon had acquired phases 1 and 2 in 2004. In 2018 Northwood Retail partnered with Invesco to assist with management of The Domain.

== Office Space ==
In 2011, Stonelake Capital Partners purchased 33 acres in the southeast corner of The Domain that would eventually become The Domain South End. This section of The Domain contains the lone holdover in The Domain from the properties days as an IBM campus - Domain 45 and Domain Tower's 2, 3 and 4, zoned as Class A office space. At 24 stories and 308 feet tall, Domain Tower 2 is currently the tallest building in The Domain

Cousins Properties owns 11 office buildings in The Domain, most notably, the 18-story Domain 9

== Neighboring Properties ==
Catty-cornered from The Domain is the Q2 Stadium, which was completed in 2021. McKalla station is a Capital MetroRail station that provides rail service to the Q2 Stadium.

Opposite Burnet from The Domain is the new 66 acre Uptown ATX, a $3 billion project being built whose first phase is currently under construction and will add 341 apartment units, 348,000 square feet of office space and 15,000 square feet of retail space. This property used to consist primarily of IBM buildings and will be serviced by the planned North Burnet/Uptown station.

Opposite Braker from The Domain is the 475-acre J. J. Pickle Research Campus.

== Opposition ==
Austin businessman and civic activist, Brian Rodgers, leader of Stop Domain Subsidies, sued the City of Austin and Endeavor Real Estate Group in 2004, claiming Endeavor purposely misled the city in order to receive what he argued amounted to $65 million in tax subsidies. The suit was settled out of court, with the settlement allowing the City of Austin to back out of deal with no penalties. Eventually, the local newspaper verified that the original claim that the subsidy was only $25 million was false and that, according to their figures, it could amount to $57 million.

Stop Domain Subsidies launched a petition drive in 2007 to put an initiative on the city ballot to stop the city from granting any city tax subsidies for developments with retail uses. The charter amendment, which would have prevented the city from giving tax incentives to retail projects, appeared on the ballot for the November 2008 election as Proposition 2, but was ultimately narrowly defeated at 48%.

In the run-up to the election, in September 2008, a political action committee named Keep Austin's Word was started by Betty Dunkerley, a former member of the Austin City Council. The group, named to resemble the slogan "Keep Austin Weird", was primarily funded by the developers of The Domain, including Simon Properties, the largest mall developer in the United States. Then Austin Mayor, Will Wynn, appeared on TV ads paid for by the Keep Austin's Word PAC, to the tune of nearly $400,000, urging that Austin "keep its word."

Another citizen's petition drive in 2012 in Austin passed, replacing Austin's all at-large voting system to single-member districts (geographic representation) and Austin's independent citizens commission (ICRC) to draw the lines. The ICRC remains the only one as of 2021 in Texas.

== Major stores ==
=== Current ===
- AT&T (opened October 2016)
- Dillard's (opened 2009)
- Macy's (opened 2007)
- Neiman Marcus (opened 2007)
- Nordstrom (opened September 2016)

== Former stores ==
As part of their Chapter 11 proceedings, Borders closed their bookstore at The Domain in April 2011. Martin+Osa, Ruehl No. 925, Oakville Grocery, Sony Style, Orange Cup and Bettysport all operated locations at the Domain at one time.

== See also ==
- Microdistrict
