= Howard station (CapMetro Rail) =

Hybrid rail station in Austin, Texas

Howard
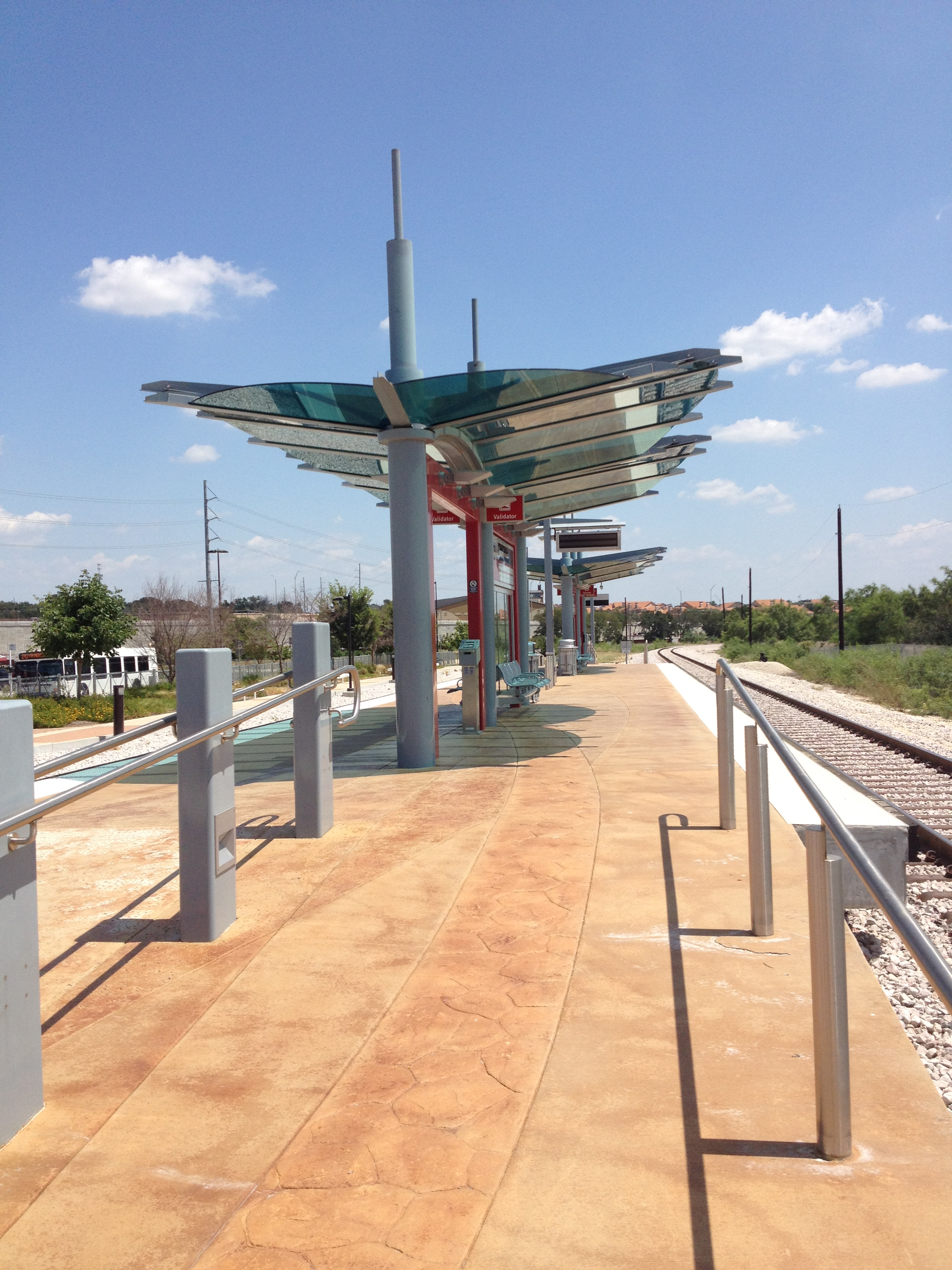

General information
- Location: 3710 Howard Lane; Austin, TX
- Coordinates: 30.440282°N 97.701067°W
- Owner: CapMetro
- Platforms: 1 side platform (2010–2018); 1 island platform (2018–present)
- Connections: MetroBus 150, 243

Construction
- Parking: 200+ spaces
- Cycle facilities: No
- Accessible: Yes

History
- Opened: March 22, 2010

Services
| Preceding station | CapMetro Rail | Following station |
|---|---|---|
| Lakeline toward Leander | Red Line | Kramer toward Downtown |

Future services
| Preceding station | CapMetro Rail | Following station |
|---|---|---|
| Lakeline toward Leander | Red Line | North Burnet/Uptown toward Downtown |
Location

Howard station is a CapMetro Rail hybrid rail station in Austin, Texas. It is located in Northwest Austin at the corner of Howard Lane and MoPac Expressway. Howard includes a Park & Ride with 200 spaces.

== History ==
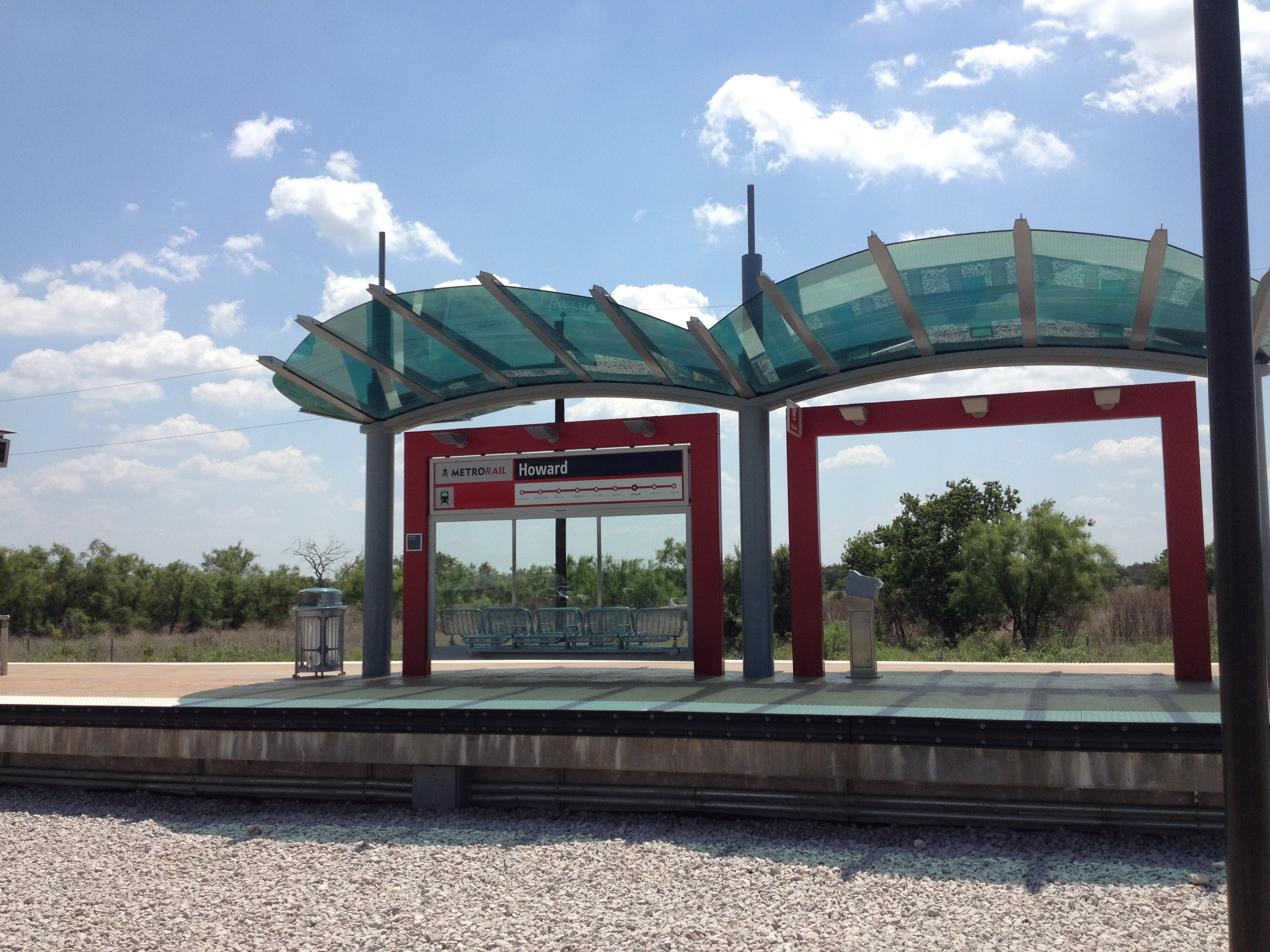
The station seen in 2012, with trains only serving the single side platform (note the empty rail bed at the bottom of frame)

The station opened on March 22, 2010 as a side platform and one track. The design of the platform allowed a second track on the unused side of the platform to be easily built due to the presence of platform-edge tactile tiles and track ballast having been constructed with the original station. In 2018, the second track was built on the previously unused side of the platform to allow trains traveling in opposing directions to pass one another at the station, similar to the design of MLK Junior Station. This transformed the station into a two-track, island platform station.

== Bus connections ==
- #50 Round Rock Howard Station
- #243 Wells Branch
