= Q2 Stadium =

Soccer stadium in Austin, Texas, United States

- McKalla Place

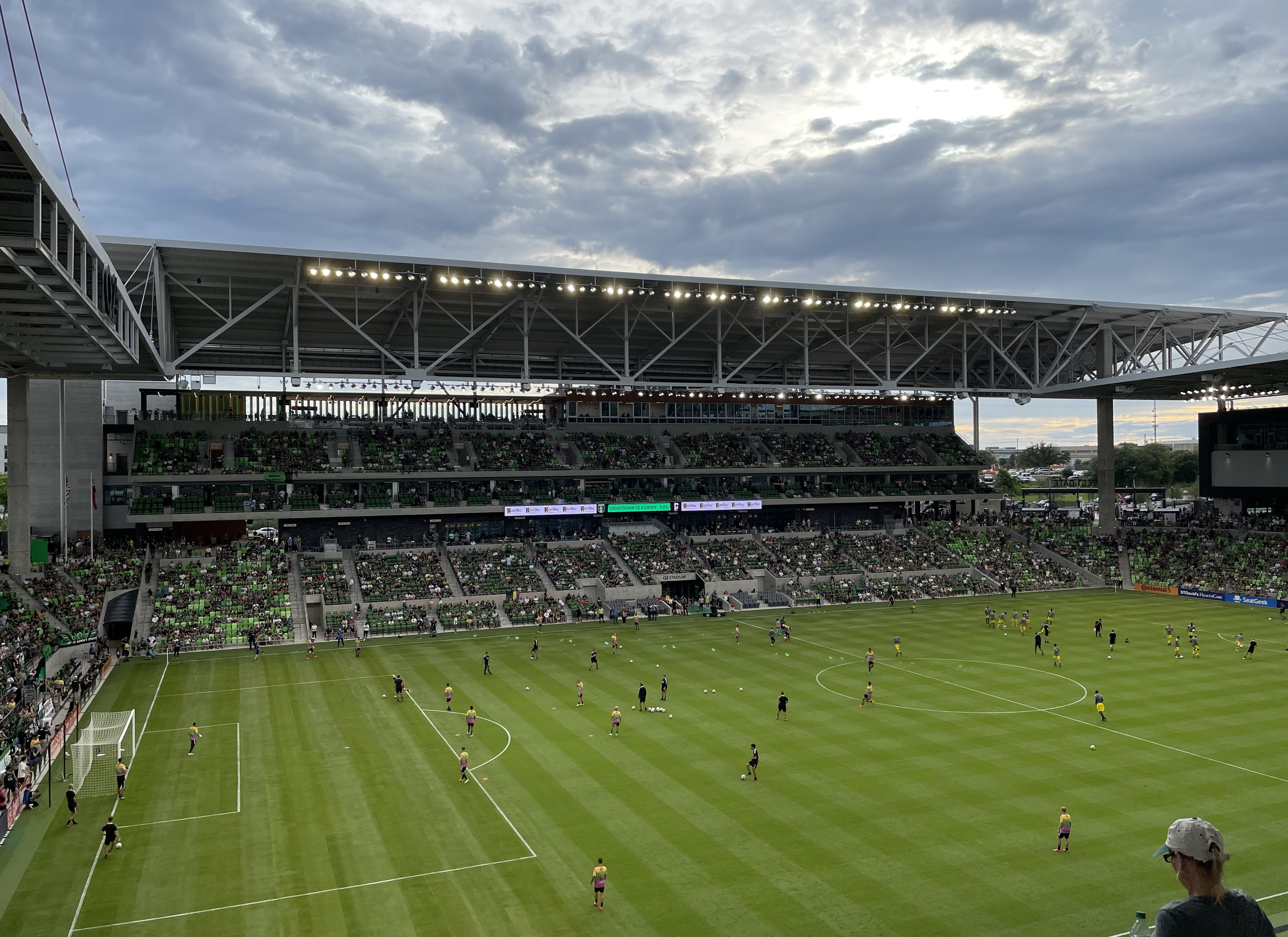
- Austin FC Stadium vs. Columbus Crew in 2021

- Location in Texas Location in the United States
- Full name: Q2 Stadium at McKalla Place
- Former names: Austin FC Stadium (tentative name)
- Address: 10414 McKalla Place
- Location: Austin, Texas, U.S.
- Coordinates: 30.3877°N 97.7195°W
- Owner: Anthony Precourt
- Operator: Two Oak Ventures LLC
- Seating type: Seated, safe standing
- Capacity: 20,738
- Type: Soccer-specific stadium
- Surface: Grass
- Field size: 115 yd × 75 yd (105 m × 69 m)
- Public transit: CapMetro Rapid: 803 at Braker/Stadium; CapMetro Rail at McKalla

Construction
- Groundbreaking: September 9, 2019
- Opened: June 16, 2021
- Cost: ~$260 million
- Architect: Gensler
- Builder: Austin Commercial
- Structural engineer: Walter P Moore
- Services engineer: Henderson Engineers
- Main contractor: Idibri

Tenant
- Austin FC (MLS) 2021–present

Q2 Stadium is a soccer-specific stadium in Austin, Texas, United States, and the home of Austin FC, a Major League Soccer (MLS) club. The stadium hosted its first event on June 16, 2021, during an international friendly between the United States women's national team and Nigeria.

== Site history ==
The earliest noted development of the tract of land was in 1956, when the land was christened as a 23.5 acre chemical manufacturing plant. The manufacturing plant produced various chemicals for Reichhold Chemicals, generally peroxides, for the majority of its 29 years as a chemical plant. The facility was closed following a series of on-site safety incidents in December 1985, which made it economically infeasible to operate.

The land was annexed into the Austin city limits on July 19, 1973.

Reichhold's parent company, DIC Corporation, sold the land to the City of Austin in 1995 for $1.4 million, with the city planning on using it as the Austin Water North Service Center. However, during construction of the facility in 2003, an explosion occurred, with workers finding illegally stored chemical waste on the site. Remediation was undertaken, stripping the site down to bedrock. The city sued DIC, and received $3.6 million.

When Precourt Sports Ventures, operator of Columbus Crew SC, announced they were intending to move the team to Austin, city staff identified eight potential sites for a permanent stadium. 10414 McKalla Place was identified as one of those eight sites, and following some public debate, became the prime candidate following the Austin City Council meeting on March 22, 2018. After several sessions, the Austin City Council granted the City Manager the authority to negotiate and execute a lease with the 7–4 vote during a special session on August 15, 2018. The city announced that the lease had been completed and signed on December 19, 2018.

The 20-year lease of the site includes yearly rent of $550,000 beginning in year six, with an additional $3.6 million being given to CapMetro for transit improvements. The stadium was fully financed and built with private money, though stadium ownership is held by the city itself. The club has the ability to extend the lease up to three times, with each extension being ten years.

== Construction ==
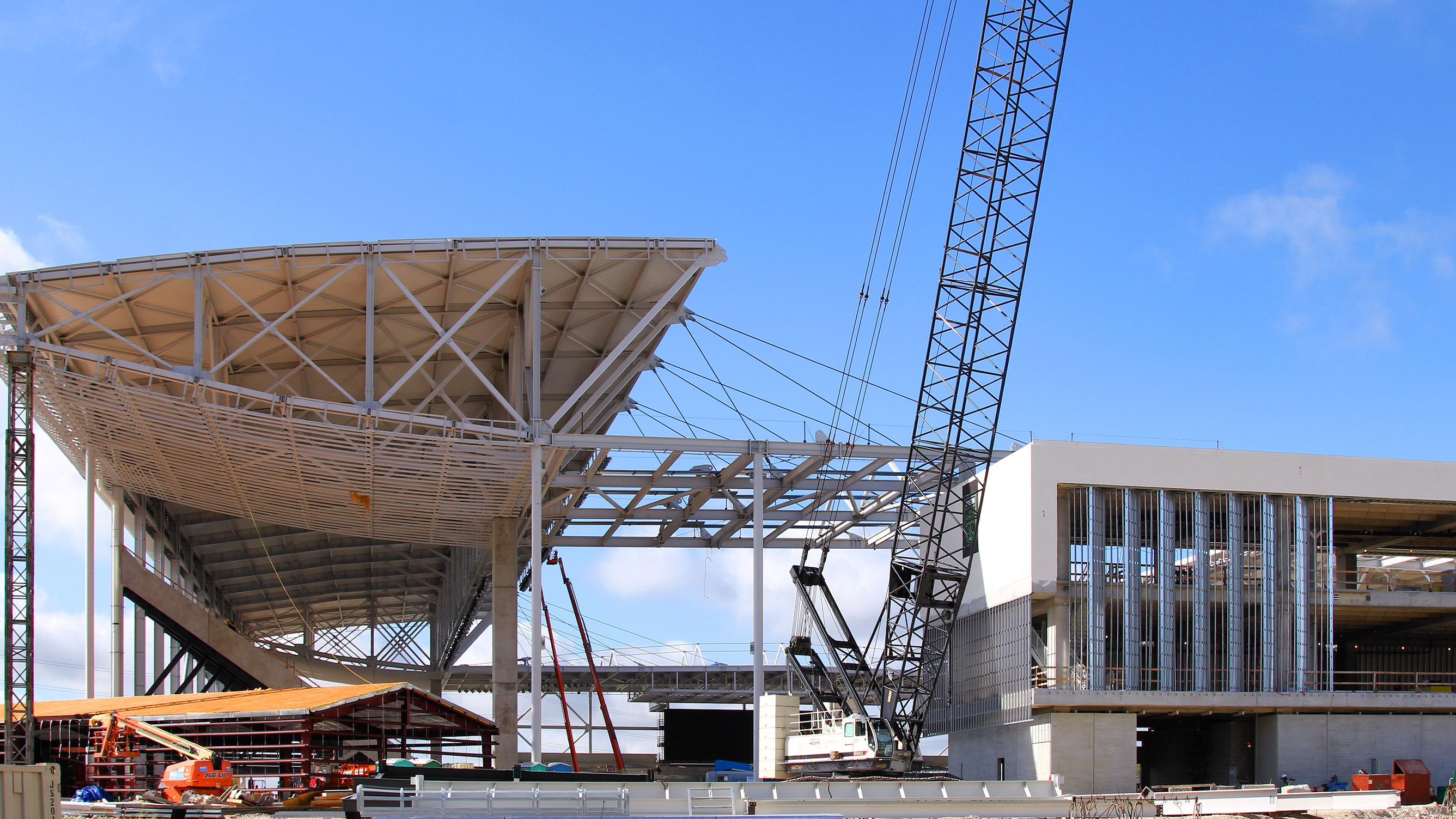
Construction progress, July 2020

The approximately 20,500-seat stadium was expected to cost $260 million, with team operator Precourt Sports Ventures privately financing the construction. Other elements for the 24-acre site and surroundings include green space, potential housing, and mixed-use retail.

In March 2019, Precourt Sports named Austin Commercial as the construction manager and Gensler as the lead architect for the stadium, and announced that groundbreaking will take place in September 2019.

Re-zoning the site to stadium requirements passed Austin City Council unanimously on June 6, 2019.

On August 19, 2019, a site plan for the Austin FC stadium in North Austin was approved by the city of Austin, Texas.

In January 2021, Austin FC entered a naming rights partnership with Q2 Holdings, a local online banking provider, resulting in the stadium formally being named Q2 Stadium on January 25, 2021.

== Public transportation ==
Q2 Stadium sits next to McKalla station on CapMetro's Red Line commuter rail service, opened in 2024 specifically to serve the stadium. Before then, the closest existing station on the Red Line was Kramer station, about a 0.5-mile (0.80 km) walk from the stadium. The new station provides a much shorter and more direct walking route from rail services to the stadium without having to cross any roads. Kramer station is expected to be relocated about 0.6-mile (0.97 km) north to the Broadmoor campus and be renamed North Burnet/Uptown station.

Bus connections to the stadium include CapMetro Rapid route 803 and CapMetro Bus routes 3, 383, and 392.

== Events ==
The stadium opened on June 16, 2021, hosting an international women's friendly between the United States and Nigeria. Christen Press scored the first ever goal in the stadium.

Austin FC played their first ever match at the stadium on June 19, 2021, against the San Jose Earthquakes. The match ended with a 0–0 draw in front of a sellout crowd of 20,738. On July 1, 2021, Jon Gallagher scored the first ever competitive goal in Q2 Stadium history, during the 27th minute of Austin FC's 3rd ever regular MLS season home match versus Portland Timbers, eventually finishing as a 4–1 win to Austin FC.

On July 29, 2021, USA beat Qatar in the Gold Cup Semifinals on a Gyasi Zardes goal in the 86th minute, and Q2 hosted its first World Cup qualifying match that October, a 2–0 win against Jamaica. Q2 hosted its first Nations League match on June 10, 2022, a 5–0 win against Grenada. FC Dallas striker Jesús Ferreira scored 4 goals for the Americans in the match, the first ever hat-trick in Q2 Stadium.

On July 4, 2022, Q2 Stadium held its first non-sporting event, when it hosted Willie Nelson's 4th of July Picnic and Firework show, an annual event that was started in 1972.

On July 30, 2022, Q2 hosted its first non-soccer event, Premier Rugby Sevens, featuring a single day Rugby sevens tournament with the Experts, Loonies, Headliners, and Loggerheads. PR7s returned to Q2 on June 17, 2023, for the Eastern Conference Kickoff.

In December 2023, Q2 was selected to host 2 matches for the 2024 Copa América, a quadrennial CONMEBOL soccer tournament. Copa América is the oldest national team soccer tournament in the world. Q2 was one of fourteen stadiums selected in the United States and one of three soccer specific stadiums chosen to host matches. Later that month, the 2024 Copa América draw revealed that the first game would feature Venezuela and Jamaica, and the second game would feature Paraguay and the winner of qualifying play-off match between Costa Rica and Honduras.

=== Club Soccer ===
| Date | Team #1 | Result | Team #2 | Tournament | Spectators |
|---|---|---|---|---|---|
| July 23, 2025 | (United States) (Canada) MLS All-Stars | 3–1 | (Mexico) Liga MX All-Stars | 2025 MLS All-Star Game | 20,738 |
| October 1, 2025 | (United States) Austin FC | 1–2 | (United States) Nashville SC | 2025 U.S. Open Cup final | 20,738 |

=== International Soccer ===
| Date | Team #1 | Result | Team #2 | Tournament | Spectators |
|---|---|---|---|---|---|
| June 16, 2021 | United States | 2–0 | Nigeria | Women's International Friendly | 20,500 |
| July 29, 2021 | Qatar | 0–1 | United States | 2021 CONCACAF Gold Cup Semifinal | 20,500 |
| October 7, 2021 | United States | 2–0 | Jamaica | 2022 FIFA World Cup qualifying | 20,500 |
| December 8, 2021 | Mexico | 2–2 | Chile | Friendly | 17,202 |
| June 10, 2022 | United States | 5–0 | Grenada | 2022–23 CONCACAF Nations League A | 20,500 |
| April 8, 2023 | United States | 2–0 | Republic of Ireland | Women's International Friendly | 20,593 |
| November 16, 2023 | United States | 3–0 | Trinidad and Tobago | 2023–24 CONCACAF Nations League A | 19,850 |
| June 30, 2024 | Jamaica | 0–3 | Venezuela | 2024 Copa América Group B | 20,240 |
| July 2, 2024 | Costa Rica | 2–1 | Paraguay | 2024 Copa América Group D | 12,765 |
| October 12, 2024 | United States | 2–0 | Panama | Friendly | 20,239 |
| October 24, 2024 | United States | 3–1 | Iceland | Women's International Friendly | 18,580 |
| June 19, 2025 | Saudi Arabia | 0–1 | United States | 2025 CONCACAF Gold Cup Group D | 11,727 |
| June 20, 2025 | Guatemala | 0–1 | Panama | 2025 CONCACAF Gold Cup Group C | 12,829 |
| June 24, 2025 | Panama | 4–1 | Jamaica | 2025 CONCACAF Gold Cup Group C | 3,283 |
| October 10, 2025 | United States | 1–1 | Ecuador | Friendly | 20,738 |
| June 5, 2026 | Puerto Rico | 0–3 | Saudi Arabia | Friendly | |

As of February 21, 2026, Austin FC holds the MLS' consecutive sellout record of 89 straight home regular season and playoff games.

== See also ==
- Lists of stadiums
- List of soccer stadiums in the United States
