= CapMetro Bus =

Public transit bus system in Austin, Texas

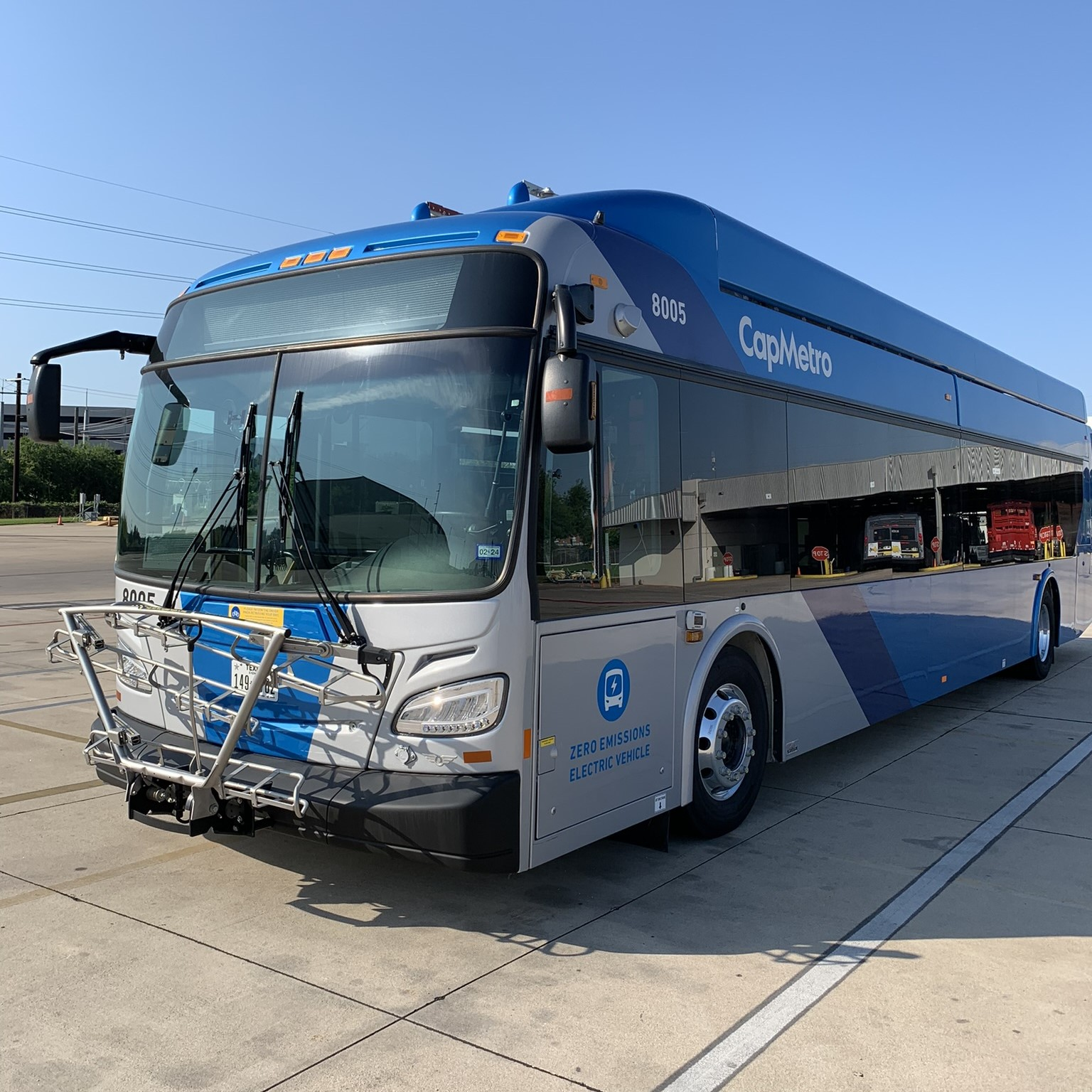
- New Flyer Xcelsior XE40 in 2023
- Parent: Capital Metro
- Founded: July 1, 1985; 41 years ago
- Headquarters: 2910 E. Fifth Street, Austin, Texas
- Locale: Central Texas
- Service area: Austin; Travis County; Parts of Williamson County
- Service type: Local bus; express bus; bus rapid transit
- Routes: 42 MetroBus; 4 MetroRapid; 11 Special bus; 5 Express bus; 7 UT Shuttle bus
- Stops: 2,300
- Hubs: 17 park and ride/transit centers
- Stations: 26 CapMetro Rapid station pairs
- Fleet: 368 buses; 12 E-buses; 55 MetroRapid buses
- Daily ridership: 72,400 (weekdays, Q1 2026)
- Annual ridership: 24,067,200 (2025)
- Fuel type: Diesel, electric
- Operator: Keolis
- President and CEO: Dottie Watkins
- Website: capmetro.org

CapMetro Bus is the bus public transit service of the Capital Metropolitan Transportation Authority (CapMetro) of Austin, Texas and serves Austin and the surrounding areas. MetroBus services include 82 standard routes and 15 high-frequency bus routes as of June 2026. It has several categories of routes: Local, Flyer and Limited, Feeder, Crosstown, Special services and UT Shuttles. CapMetro also operates an express bus service, MetroExpress, and a bus rapid transit service, CapMetro Rapid, in addition to the agency's commuter rail service, CapMetro Rail. In 2025, the bus system had a ridership of 24,067,200, or about 72,400 per weekday as of the first quarter of 2026.

== History ==
At the agency's inception, CapMetro originally operated a series of "paired" route service where two different routes that pass through downtown are served by the same buses, allowing riders to transfer between certain routes without leaving the bus. Since 2008, this practice has been eliminated and after a number of route pair reassignments, the agency merged the paired routes under single route numbers (for example, the 1 North Lamar and 13 South Congress were originally paired as they were the two busiest routes in the system, but they have since been merged as 1 North Lamar/South Congress).

Meanwhile, most local routes carried two digits before CapMetro assigned a third digit for routes that do not serve downtown in 2000 (for example, 25 Ohlen became 325). Flyer routes were renumbered altogether to match their local stop counterparts (for example, 65 Manchaca Flyer became 103), while express routes that operated during commute times only contained letters (for example, NEX Northeast Express was renamed 990 Manor/Elgin Express; but was originally 70 Northeast Express).

== Vehicles ==
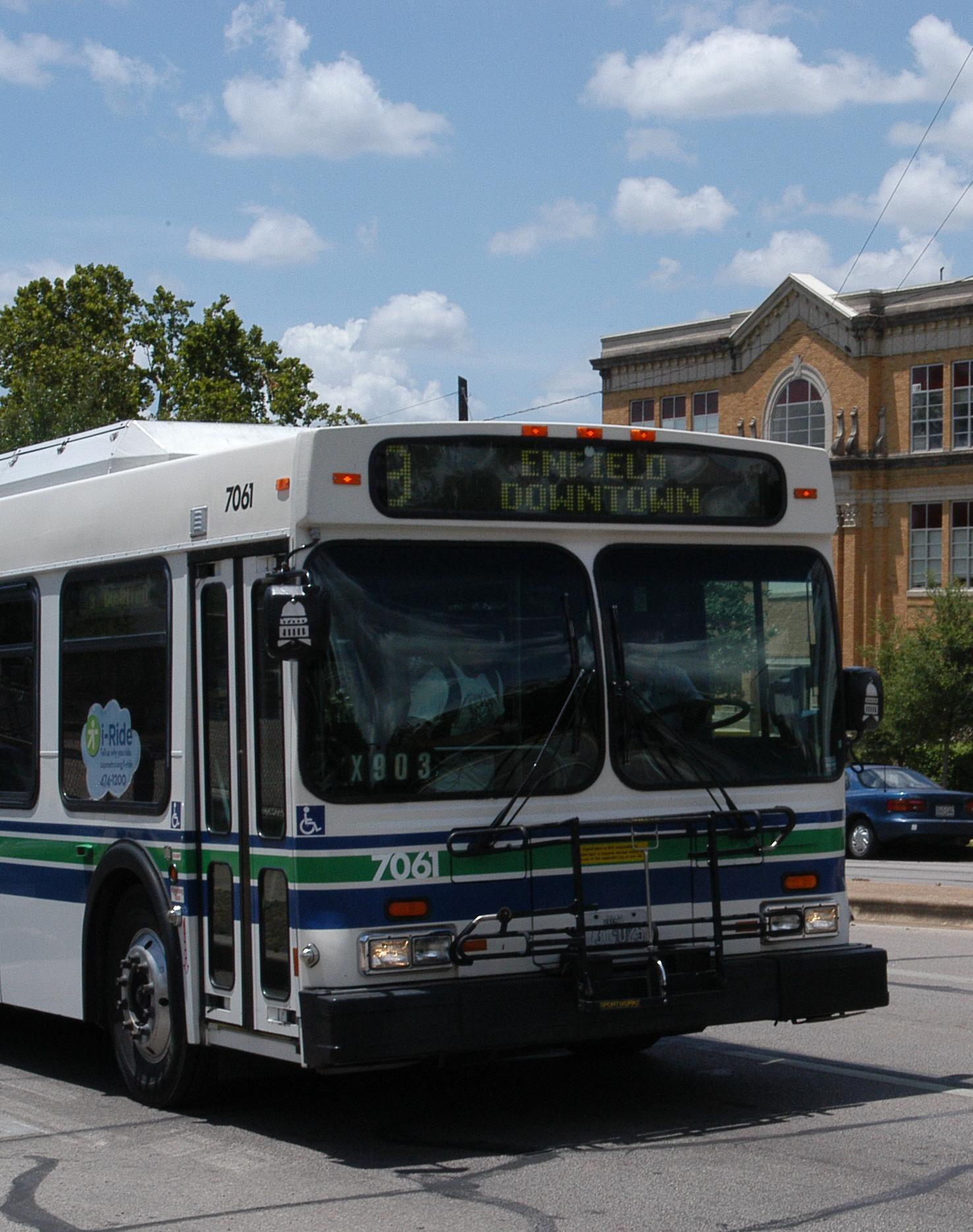
CapMetro Bus in former livery

The majority of the current bus fleet consists of vehicles produced by two manufacturers, Gillig and New Flyer, with only relatively small generational design variations, most visibly in the use of flip-dot destination displays on older series versus LED displays on newer buses. A few smaller series of buses were acquired from other manufacturers, notably Optima (used preferentially on MetroRail shuttles) and MCI (used on express services). Older bus series produced by TMC and Blue Bird are no longer in service.

== Standard routes ==
=== Local ===
MetroBus Local routes are intended to connect specific neighborhoods of Austin to Downtown Austin, with frequent stops. Since June 2014, north–south service within downtown Austin for all routes is provided via Lavaca Street northbound and Guadalupe Street southbound, with all routes serving at least one stop along both streets.

Prior to relocating routes to the Guadalupe/Lavaca corridor, many routes formerly utilized Brazos Street northbound and Colorado Street southbound before various construction projects took place. Since June 2014, the remaining lines no longer use Congress Avenue between 11th Street and Barton Springs Road. East-west service within downtown Austin for all routes is provided via 5th Street eastbound and 4th and 6th Streets westbound, so as to provide a connection along the Lavaca/Guadalupe corridor.

Some MetroBus routes are designated High-Frequency routes and operate with a headway of 15 minutes between buses weekdays, 20 minutes Saturdays. Routes as of August 2026:

MetroBus Local routesMetroBus Local High-Frequency routes
Rt.	Name	Terminals Interlines		Created	Notes	Ref.
1	North Lamar / South Congress	Tech Ridge Park and Ride via North Lamar Transit Center	E William Cannon at Bluff Springs via South Congress Transit Center: 7	—	Originally 1 North Lamar, paired with 13; merged in Aug 2001; Jan 2006 split into 1L and 1M; Renamed 1 Metric/South Congress (sometimes 1 North Lamar/ South Congress via Metric) in 2014, Lamar section became 275; Jun 3, 2018 rerouted on Lamar and name changed, replacing 275; old route via Metric covered by 325	—
2	Rosewood / Cesar Chavez	Eastside Bus Plaza via Rosewood (clockwise) or Cesar Chavez (counterclockwise)	Republic Square via Rosewood (counterclockwise) or Cesar Chavez (clockwise)	—	Paired with 10 until Feb 2000; Jun 3, 2018 Ledesma, Lott, Prock, and Sara section eliminated; Merged with 17 on January 8, 2023; Extended along Shady Lane between Eastside Bus Plaza and Oak Springs at Springdale to become a circulator on August 16, 2026	—
3	Burnet / Manchaca	Southpark Meadows: 10	Great Hills at Stonelake: 392	—	Originally 3 Burnet, paired with 17 until Feb 2000 then with 12; Aug 2001, merged with 12 as 3 Burnet / Manchaca; Feb 2002, extended north to the Arboretum over portions of 244 and 240	—
4	7th Street	5th at Campbell	7th at Shady	—	Paired with 18 until Aug 2008; Jun 3, 2018 service east of Shady on 7th, 183, and Vargas eliminated; renamed 4 7th Street; Proposed MetroRapid 804 on remainder of the corridor	
5	Woodrow / Lamar	Techni Center	Northcross Mall	—	Originally 5 Woodrow, paired with 26 until Aug 2008; merged with 16 to form 5 Woodrow/South 5th; Jun 3, 2018, sections transferred to 105 and 315; service on Monterey Oaks, Staggerbrush, and Roadrunner discontinued; rerouted on Lamar to downtown replacing part of 338; Merged with 6 on January 8, 2023.; Extended to Techni Center on June 7, 2026.	—
7	Duval / Dove Springs	E William Cannon at Bluff Springs: 1	Crestview station	—	Originally 7 Duval, paired with 27 until Aug 2008 when they merged; Aug 2010, 7 extended north to current end replacing part of 339 Walnut Creek / Koenig (39 before February 2001); Jun 3, 2018, service on Peppertree Pkwy discontinued; service on Huntland, St. Johns, and Cameron transferred to 10 and 300	—
10	South First / Red River	Southpark Meadows: 3	Rutherford Wal-Mart	—	Originally 10 South First, paired with 2 until Feb 2000 then 20 until Aug 2008 when 10 merged with 15 to form 10 South First/Red River; Jun 3, 2018, service north of ACC Highland transferred to 324; parts of old route covered by 325 and 350; Red River section proposed to be covered by the Gold Line as part of Project Connect	
18	ML King	Exposition at Lake Austin	Expo Center Park and Ride	—	Paired with 4 Montopolis until Aug 2008; MetroRapid 818 proposed for this corridor; Extended to Expo Center over part of 237 Jun 2026	
20	Riverside	Austin-Bergstrom International Airport	Dean Keeton at Speedway	—	Sometimes signed "20 Manor Road / Riverside"; Originally 20 Manor Road / LBJ; Portion split off as 120 by Aug 1996; Paired with 12 until Feb 2000; then 10 until Aug 2008 when it merged with 26 to form 20 Manor / Riverside; Jun 3, 2018, rerouted directly and extended to Austin-Bergstrom International Airport replacing part of 350 and causing 100 to be discontinued. Portion of old route via Wickersham transferred to 310; service on Oltorf and Pleasant Valley covered by 300; Riverside section proposed to be covered by the Blue Line (CapMetro) as part of Project Connect; MetroRapid 820 proposed on remainder of the corridor; Jun 7, 2026, Manor Road section split off as 320	
30	Barton Creek / Bull Creek	Northcross Mall	Westgate Transit Center via Barton Creek Square Mall	—	Paired with 28 until Feb 2000, when 28 was renumbered 328; 30 paired with 328 until Aug 2008; Jun 3, 2018, section to South Congress Transfer Center transferred to 315; Rerouted to Westgate Transit Center rather than Western Trails Boulevard in Jun 2019; Merged with 19 on January 8, 2023	

Former Local routesFormer Local High-Frequency routes
Rt.	Name	Created	Eliminated	Notes	Ref.
1L	North Lamar / South Congress	—	Jan 2014	Eliminated due to creation of 801; service along Lamar replaced by 275	—
1M	Metric / South Congress	—	Jan 2014	Renamed 1 due to creation of 801.	—
6	East 12th	—	Jan 8, 2023	Merged with 5	—
8	Govalle	—	Aug 2001	Rerouted over portion of 20 when 20 and 120 were split by fall 1996; Renamed 300	—
9	Enfield / Travis Heights	—	Aug 2010	Paired with 14 when 11 eliminated; Originally 9 Enfield; August 2008 it replaced 14 and name changed; Eliminated due to low ridership; covered by: 21/22 on Exposition, 662 on Enfield, 1 on Congress, 331 on Oltorf, 300 extension on Ben White west of Woodward; Service west of MoPac not on Enfield or Exposition not immediately replaced until restored by Pickup; service in Travis Heights neighborhood and on Burleson (from Oltorf to Ben White) not replaced	—
11	Cherrywood	—	Jan 1994	Paired with 14 until eliminated	—
11	Stassney	Aug 1995	Jun 1996	Renamed 111	—
12	Manchaca	—	Aug 2001	Paired with 20 until Feb 2000 then 3 until 3 and 12 merged	—
13	South Congress	—	Aug 2001	Paired with 1 until merged with it	—
14	Travis Heights	—	Aug 2008	Paired with 11 until 11 eliminated then with 9 until 14 and 9 merged	—
15	Red River	—	Aug 2008	Paired with 16 until 15 merged with 10	—
16	South Fifth / Westgate	—	Aug 2008	Paired with 15 until 16 merged with 5	—
17	Cesar Chavez	—	Jan 8, 2023	Merged with 2	—
19	Bull Creek	—	Jan 8, 2023	Replaced by 9 by 1985, but reinstated in 1986.; Merged with 30	—
21	Exposition	—	Jun 3, 2018	Originally 21 Lake Austin, extended by 1985 and renamed.; Extended in 1986 to replace 22; Between 1989 and 1991, the counterclockwise direction replaced by reintroduced 22; Signed 21 Exposition Loop; eliminated at the same time as 22; Parts replaced by 335; part covered by 17 and 18; portion on Exposition replaced by Pickup	—
22	Chicon	—	Jun 3, 2018	Originally east of I-35 only; replaced in 1986 with 21; Reintroduced between 1989 and 1991, replacing 21 in the counterclockwise direction; Signed 22 Chicon Loop; eliminated at the same time as 21; Parts replaced by 335; part covered by 17 and 18; portion on Exposition replaced by Pickup; remainder changed from 22 to 322 as it no longer went through downtown	—
23	Wood Hollow	—	Jan 1994	Merged with 19	—
23	Johnny Morris	Jan 1998	Aug 2010	Renamed 323	—
24	Balcones	—	Jul 1986	Merged with 9 and 19	—
25	Ohlen	—	Feb 2000	Merged into 3 by 1985, but resplit in 1986.; Paired with 3 until Jan 1997 on weekdays, and until Jan 1998 on Saturdays; Renamed 325	—
26	Riverside	—	Aug 2008	Paired with 5 until merged with 20	—
27	Dove Springs	—	Aug 2008	Paired with 7 until merged with it 7	—
28	Ben White	—	Feb 2000	Originally paired with 30 until 28 renamed 328	—
29	Barton Hills	—	Aug 2010	Paired with 19 until Jan 1998; Eliminated due to low ridership; service on Robert E. Lee Blvd. transferred to 30	—
31	Oltorf	—	Feb 2001	Formed between January 1989 and August 1991.; Paired with 46 until Jan 1999; Renamed 331	—
32	Airport Boulevard	—	Feb 2000	Formed between January 1989 and August 1991, with portions replacing part of the ENW.; Combined with 46 and part of 8 to form 350	—
33	William Cannon	—	Feb 2000	Formed in the early 1986 expansion.; Renamed 333	—
34	Great Hills	Jan 1999	Feb 2000	Part transferred to 383; remainder redundant with other routes	—
37	Colony Park	—	Jun 3, 2018	Formed in the early 1986 expansion.; Paired with 38 until Aug 2000; Rerouted over part of 320; As the route no longer served downtown, renamed 337	—
38	South Lamar	—	May 2001	Formed in the early 1986 expansion.; Paired with 37 until Aug 2000; Renamed 338 South Lamar	—
39	Walnut Creek / Koenig	—	Feb 2001	Formed in the early 1986 expansion as 39 Walnut Creek.; Extended and renamed by January 1994.; Renamed 339	—
40	Parkfield	—	Feb 2000	Formed in the early 1986 expansion.; By January 1994, extended limited stop to the UT campus replacing part of 41L; this section discontinued by 1996.; Renamed 240; part transferred to 383	—
42	Quail Valley / Metric	—	Feb 2000	Formed in the early 1986 expansion.; Renamed 242; rerouted off Quail Valley	—
43	Windsor Hills	—		Formed in the early 1986 expansion.; Replaced by extension of 7 by 1989- later split as 45	—
43	South Oaks	—	Jun 1996	Formed by 1991 as 43 Southwest Oaks when 12 was split; Extended into Buckingham Estates and renamed by Jan 1994; Renumbered 203/204	—
44	Cedar Bend	—	Feb 2000	Formed in the early 1986 expansion as 44 Arboretum/IBM/Burnet; Renamed 44 Balcones Northwest by 1994; Rerouted and renamed 44 Cedar Bend; Renamed 244	—
45	Buckingham Estates	—		Formed in the early 1986 expansion; Removed by 1991, replaced by TeleRide, later 43 extension	—
45	Copperfield	—	Feb 2000	Formed ca. 1992 when 7 was shortened; Renamed 245	—
46	Steck	—	1992	Formed in the early 1986 expansion; Merged with 19	—
46	Bergstrom	—	Feb 2000	Formed when 26 was split east of ACC Riverside.; Paired with 31 until Jan 1999; Combined with 32 and part of 8 to form 350	—
47	Anderson Mill	—	1991	Formed in the early 1986 expansion; Discontinued due to low ridership.	
47	East 26th Street	—	Jun 1997	Created between January 1994 and July 1995 as Dean East/UT.; Converted to a regular bus route ca. 1996.	—
111	Stassney	Jun 1996	Feb 2000	Renumbered from 11; renamed 311; number later reused.	—
120	St. Johns	Jun 1996	Feb 2001	Replaced St. Johns section of 20; extended east replacing 208 in Jan 1998; Renamed 320	—
151	Allandale	Sep 1996	Jan 2014	Split from 51; Renamed 491	—
161	Delwood	Jan 2006	Jan 2014	Split from 151; Renamed 492	—
201	North Loop	1996	Jan 1998	—	—
202	45th Street	1996	Jan 1997	Went in the opposite direction as 201; Eliminated when 201 rerouted and became an independent route	—
202	Battle Bend	—	Jan 2010	Eliminated due to low ridership.	—
203	Buckingham Circulator	Jun 1996	Aug 2002	Originally 43 South Oaks, renumbered when route became a circulator; Renamed 252 and western part eliminated	—
204	Southwest Oaks Circulator	Jun 1996	Aug 2002	Originally 43 South Oaks, renumbered when route became a circulator; Renamed 252 and western part eliminated	—
205	East Lakeline	Aug 1996	Jun 1997		—
206	West Lakeline	Aug 1996	Jun 1997		—
208	East Austin Circulator	Aug 1996	Aug 1997	Merged into 120	—
209	Lohmans	Aug 1996	Aug 1997	Served The Island, Bar K Ranch, and City Hall area; Discontinued due to low ridership; Bar K Ranch and City Hall area service merged into 102	—
238	Westgate	—	Jun 3, 2018	Created from part of 338; Renumbered 318 and extended east via Slaughter Lane	—
240	Rutland	Feb 2000	Jun 3, 2018	Renamed from 40; Section on Kramer eliminated; section on Braker transferred to 392 in Feb 2002; Rerouted north on Parkfield replacing part of 244; rerouted several times, until August 2010; Portions replaced by 324; sections covered by 803, 466, and 325; other portions lost service until restored by Pickup	—
242	Metric	Feb 2000	Jan 2006	Renamed from 42; Eliminated in January 2006; part became branch of 1; rest renamed 243	—
244	Cedar Bend	Feb 2000	Feb 2002	Renamed from 44 Cedar Bend; Part transferred to 3; part to 240; remainder renumbered 391	—
245	Copperfield	Feb 2000	Feb 2002	Renamed from 45; Part transferred to 1; remainder renumbered 392	—
252	Buckingham Slaughter	—	Jan 2006	Became 201; section through Buckingham eliminated due to low ridership	—

=== Limited and Flyer ===
CapMetro's Limited and Flyer routes are limited stop services between two destinations. Limited routes tend to have fewer stops compared to their local counterparts, while Flyer routes serve nonstop between downtown or the UT campus and their neighborhoods of service. Limited and Flyer routes are designated by routes 100–199. Routes as of January 2023:

MetroBus Flyer routes
Rt.	Name	Terminals Interlines		Created	Notes	Ref.
103	Manchaca Flyer	Slaughter at Manchaca	Deen Keeton at San Jacinto	Aug 2001	Renamed from 65; Rush hour service: northbound in the morning peak, southbound in the afternoon peak; No boarding beyond Manchaca at Prather traveling northbound or beyond N Lamar at W 5th southbound	—
105	South 5th Flyer	UT/ West Mall	Westgate Mall	Jun 3, 2018	Replaced part of 5	—
111	South Mopac Flyer	Escarpment at South Bay	San Jacinto at Dean Keeton	—	Rush hour service: northbound in the morning peak, southbound in the afternoon peak; Proposed to be rerouted via Mopac to a new Park and Ride at Slaughter as part of Project Connect	
135	Dell Limited	E 7th at Pleasant Valley	Tech Ridge Park and Ride	—	Rush hour service: northbound in the morning peak, southbound in the afternoon	—
142	Metric Flyer	S Congress at Riverside	Amherst at Duval	Aug 2001	Renamed from 62; Rush hour service: southbound in the morning peak, northbound in the afternoon; No boarding beyond W Rundberg at N Lamar when traveling southbound, Congress at 18th northbound	—
152	Round Rock Tech Ridge Limited	Tech Ridge Station	Dell Way at Greenlawn: 50	Jan 2020	—	—
171	Oak Hill Flyer	Silver Mine at SH 71	Red River at E 32nd	Aug 2001	Rush hour service (except a single reverse peak run midday): northbound in the morning peak, southbound in the afternoon; Renamed from 63	—

Former Limited and Flyer routes
Rt.	Name	Created	Eliminated	Notes	Ref.
41L	Wells Branch Limited	—	Jan 1994	*Formed in the late 1986 expansion.	*Eliminated due to low ridership; partially replaced by 40 which became limited
52	Round Rock Tech Ridge	Aug 2016	Jan 2020	Renumbered 152 because route is limited-stop	—
61	Dove Springs Flyer	—	Aug 2001	Renamed 127	—
62	Metric Flyer	—	Aug 2001	Renamed 142	—
63	Oak Hill Flyer	—	Aug 2001	Formerly OKX; Renamed 171	—
64	South Central Flyer	—	Aug 2001	Renamed 110	—
65	Manchaca Flyer	—	Aug 2001	Renamed 103	—
66	North Central Flyer	—	1996	Eliminated and replaced by additional trips on 9.	—
67	Cameron Road Flyer	—	Aug 2001	Eliminated due to low ridership.	—
68	MLK Flyer	—	Aug 1997	Eliminated due to low ridership.	—
74	North Burnet Flyer	—	Feb 2001	Number chosen as express of 44; Originally 74 William Cannon/Parmer Express until Jan 1997; Renamed 174	—
101	North Lamar Limited	Jun 1999	Jan 2014	Initially trial route planned to end Jan 2000, but successful enough it was kept; Eliminated due to creation of 801	—
110	South Central Flyer	Aug 2001	Jun 3, 2018	Renamed from 64; Rush hour service; northbound in the morning peak, southbound in the afternoon; No boarding beyond S 1st at Stassney traveling northbound, S 1st at Barton Springs southbound	—
122	Four Points Limited	—	Jun 3, 2018	Eliminated due to low ridership; Proposed to be restored as part of Project Connect, but would only go from Downtown to proposed Four Points Park-and-Ride; will not have service from the Four Points Park-and-Ride to Lakeline; would also stop at a proposed Park-and-Ride at RM 2222 & Loop 360	
127	Dove Springs Flyer	Aug 2001	Jun 3, 2018	Renamed from 61 Dove Springs Flyer; Rush hour service; northbound in the morning peak, southbound in the afternoon; No boarding beyond E Stassney at I-35 traveling northbound, E Cesar Chavez at Trinity southbound	—
137	Colony Park Flyer	—	—	Eliminated due to low ridership.	—
150	Round Rock Howard Station Limited	Jan 2020	Jan 8, 2023	Replaced limited-stop portion of 50	—
174	North Burnet Limited	—	—	Eliminated due to low ridership.	—
495	Dell	—	Jan 2006	Renumbered 135	—

=== Feeder ===
CapMetro's Feeder routes are local services between a neighborhood and a major transfer point for connecting service. Feeder routes are designated by routes 200–299. Routes as of June 2026:

MetroBus Feeder routes
Rt.	Name	Terminals		Created	Notes	Ref.
201	Southpark Meadows	Akins High School	E William Cannon at Bluff Springs	—	Some services short-turn at Southpark Meadows	—
214	Northwest Feeder	Thunderbird at Dawn	Lakeline Station	Aug 2000	Renamed from 102; Renamed from 214 Lago Vista Feeder	—
217	Montopolis Feeder	Eastside Bus Plaza	ACC Riverside	Aug 2019	Replaced portion of 17 (now part of 2) due to long-term construction at US 183 and Montopolis intersection'; Rerouted from ACC Riverside to Fairway/Grove on August 16, 2026	—
228	VA Clinic	Metropolis at Veteran's Center	ACC Riverside	Jan 2000	Renamed from 28; August 2010 renamed from 328; June 3, 2018, changed from 228; service on Burleson, 71, Todd, and Woodward discontinued due to low ridership; rerouted replacing part of 331	—
233	Decker/Daffan Lane	Loyola at Sandshof	Expo Center Park and Ride	—	Formerly 233 Far Northeast Feeder; Extended to Expo Center on eastern end and truncated to Johnny Morris Road on western end to become clockwise circulator Jun 2026	—
243	Wells Branch	Howard station	Tech Ridge Park and Ride	—	Replaced part of 242	—
271	Del Valle Flex	ACC Riverside	Rass Road	Jan 2010	—	—

Former Feeder routes
Rt.	Name	Created	Eliminated	Notes	Ref.
39A CF	Cedar Feeder	—	Jan 1994	—	—
41 LVF	Lago Vista Feeder	—	Feb 1995	Split into 102 and 103.	—
102 LVF	Lago Vista Feeder	Aug 2000	—	Renamed 214	
103 LVC	Lago Vista Circulator	Aug 1996	—	Replaced by revised 102 and new 209.	—
237	Northeast Feeder	-	Jun 7, 2026	Replaced by 18	-
275	North Lamar Feeder	2014	Jun 3, 2018	Created from part of 1; Now covered by 1	—

=== Crosstown ===
CapMetro's Crosstown routes are local services between two neighborhoods of Austin, for which the route does not pass through Downtown Austin or the University of Texas. Some Crosstown routes are designated High-Frequency routes and operate with a headway of 15 minutes between buses weekdays, 20 minutes Saturdays. Crosstown routes are designated by routes 300–399.

MetroBus Crosstown routesMetroBus Crosstown High-Frequency routes
Rt.	Name	Terminals Interlines		Created	Notes	Ref.
300	Springdale/Oltorf	Crestview Station: 350; 383	Westgate Transit Center	Aug 2001	Renamed from 8; extended south of Oltorf & Burton in Aug 2010 due to elimination of 9; Jun 3, 2018 rerouted to Westgate Mall replacing most of 331; route to south Congress Transfer Center transferred to 310; rerouted on 51st, Cameron, and St. Johns (replacing parts of 37 and 320); old Route along Berkman transferred to 10; service on Rogge discontinued, later restored by Pickup; Rerouted to Westgate Transit Center rather than Western Trails Boulevard Jun 2019	
310	Parker/Wickersham	ACC Riverside	South Congress Transit Center	Jun 3, 2018	Replaced parts of 20, 331, and 300	
311	Stassney	ACC Riverside	Westgate Transit Center: 350	Feb 2000	Renamed from 111; Rerouted to Westgate Transit Center rather than Western Trails Boulevard Jun 2019	
315	Ben White	South Congress Transit Center	ACC Pinnacle	Jun 3, 2018	Replaced parts of 30 and 5; Rerouted to Westgate Transit Center rather than Western Trails Boulevard Jun 2019	
318	Westgate/Slaughter	Goodnight Ranch Park and Ride	Westgate Transit Center	Jun 3, 2018	Renumbered from 238; extended east on Slaughter to Thaxton at Panadero; Rerouted to Westgate Transit Center rather than Western Trails Boulevard Jun 2019; Truncated to Goodnight Ranch Park and Ride Jun 2026	
320	Manor Road	LBJ High School	Dean Keeton at University	Jun 7, 2026	Replaced part of 20	—
322	Chicon/Cherrywood	RBJ Center	Hancock Shopping Center	Jun 3, 2018	Renumbered and shorted from 22	—
324	Georgian / Ohlen	Northcross at Foster: 30	Highland Station	Jun 3, 2018	Replaced parts of 10, 240, and 325	—
325	Metric / Rundberg	Tech Ridge Park and Ride	Rutherford Wal-Mart	Feb 2000	Renamed from 25; Jun 3, 2018, rerouted to Tech Ridge Park and Ride replacing part of 1; name changed from 325 Ohlen; route to Northcross transferred to 324	—
333	William Cannon	Oak Hill Plaza Brush Country at William Cannon	Goodnight Ranch Park and Ride	Feb 2000	Renamed from 33; Jun 3, 2018, rerouted so it alternates between serving William Cannon/Brush Country and serving both Convict Hill/Woodcreek and ACC Pinnacle; Trips eastbound serve one terminus before serving the other; first terminus served depends on time of day and day of week; Rerouted to Goodnight Ranch on Jun 7, 2026	—
335	35th / 38th Street	Exposition at Westover	Mueller	Jun 3, 2018	Replaced part of 21/22	—
337	Koenig/Colony Park	Balcones at Burnet	Expo Center Park and Ride	Jun 3, 2018	Renumbering of 37; rerouted west over part of 320; Extended to Expo Center Jun 7, 2026	—
339	Anderson/Springdale	Northcross Mall via North Lamar Transit Center	Manor at Susquehanna via Norwood Transit Center	Jun 3, 2018	Replaced part of 323; small portion was part of 339; Western half merged back with 323 in June 2026.	—
345	45th Street	Burnet at North Loop	Hancock Shopping Center	Jun 3, 2018	Replaced part of 338; Proposed to be extended west to Bull Creek	
350	Airport Boulevard	North Lamar Transit Center: 300; 383	ACC Riverside	Feb 2000	Created as a merge of 32, 46 and part of 8; Jun 3, 2018, section south of ACC Riverside transferred to 20	—
383	Research	North Lamar Transit Center: 300; 350	Lakeline station	—	—	—
392	Braker	Kramer Station: 3	Tech Ridge Park and Ride	—	Jun 3, 2018 service to the Arboretum discontinued; replaced by 383	—

Former Crosstown routesFormer High-Frequency Crosstown routes
Rt.	Name	Created	Eliminated	Notes	Ref.
320	St. Johns	Feb 2001	Jun 3, 2018	Renamed from 120; Replaced by 322, rerouted 300, and 337	—
323	Anderson	Aug 2010	Jun 7, 2026	Renamed from 23; extended over the eastern half of 339; Jun 3, 2018, split, and section east of the Wal-Mart renamed 339; Jun 7 2026, merged back into 339	—
328	Ben White	Feb 2000	Aug 2010	Renamed from 28; paired with 30 until Aug 2008; Service west of Congress Avenue rerouted to Congress Transit Center, became extension of 30; east of Congress Avenue remained, rerouted to Congress Transit Center and renamed 228	—
331	Oltorf	Feb 2001	Jun 3, 2018	Renamed from 31; Replaced by 300 and 228	—
338	Lamar / 45th	May 2001	Jun 3, 2018	Renamed from 38 due to rerouting away from downtown; Section later renumbered 238	—
339	Walnut Creek / Koenig	Feb 2001	Aug 2010	Renamed from 39; East of IH-35 became part of 323; west of IH-35 became part of 320; Number reused Jun 2018 when 323 split	—
391	Parmer	—	—	Eliminated due to low ridership.	—

=== Round Rock ===
CapMetro operates several services in the suburb Round Rock. Round Rock is not a CapMetro member city and therefore doesn't pay the 1% sales tax to CapMetro. Instead, Round Rock contracts CapMetro to provide certain mass transit services for the city. Round Rock services are designated as 50-99 and 152. CapMetro also operates MetroExpress route 980 North MoPac Express and Flyer service 152 Round Rock Tech Ridge Limited between Tech Ridge and Round Rock. Routes as of January 2023:

MetroBus Round Rock routes
Rt.	Name	Terminals Interlines		Created	Notes	Ref.
50	Round Rock Howard Station	Dell Way at Greenlawn: 152	ACC Round Rock	August 2016	Jan 2020, limited-stop portion split off as 150	

Former Round Rock routes
Rt.	Name	Created	Eliminated	Notes	Ref.
51	Round Rock Circulator	August 2016	January 8, 2023	—	

== Special service ==
CapMetro's special service routes are routes that do not fit in any other category. Special service routes are designated as routes 400–499.

=== Night Owl ===
Night Owl buses are overnight services.

MetroBus Night Owl services
Rt.	Name	Terminals		Created	Notes	Ref.
481	Night Owl North Lamar	6th at Congress	N Lamar at W Rundberg	—	Named 481 Night Owl North until Aug 2012	—
483	Night Owl Riverside	6th at Congress	Austin-Bergstrom International Airport	—	Named 483 Night Owl Southeast until Aug 2012; Extended to Austin-Bergstrom International Airport in Aug 2025	—
484	Night Owl South Lamar	6th at Congress	Victory at Ben White	—	Aug 2012, section along South 1st eliminated; renamed to remove South 1st from name	—
485	Night Owl Cameron	6th at Congress	Rutherford Wal-Mart	—	Aug 2012, consolidated and replaced part of 482; old route along IH-35 and Cameron eliminated	—
486	Night Owl South Congress	6th at Congress	Pleasant Valley at E William Cannon	—	Aug 2012, renamed from 486 Night Owl Dove Springs; rerouted off William Cannon going east	—

Former Night Owl routes
Rt.	Name	Created	Eliminated	Notes	Ref.
482	Night Owl East	—	—	Consolidated with 485; section along Rosewood east of Airport, Springdale, 7th and others to Downtown eliminated	—

=== Other special services ===
Routes as of September 2021:

MetroBus special services
Rt.	Name	Terminals		Created	Notes	Ref.
465	MLK/University of Texas	San Jacinto at E 23rd	MLK Jr. station	—	Formerly 465	—
466	Kramer/Domain	Pickle Research Campus	ACC Northridge via Kramer station	—	Circular service, runs counterclockwise; Formerly 466; Alternates between serving Pickle Research Campus and ACC Northridge; Proposed to be converted to local route as part of Project Connect	
490	HEB Shuttle	E Riverside at Pleasant Valley	RBJ Center / E Cesar Chavez at Trinity	February 2001	Midday service only, four days a week; Monday and Thursday terminates at E Cesar Chavez at Trinity; Wednesday and Friday terminates at RBJ Center; Formerly 90	—
491	Allandale	N Lamar at W 38th	Rockwood at Ashdale	—	Midday service only; runs Tuesday, Thursday, Saturday; Curb-to-curb paratransit service operating along fixed route; Formerly 151; one part renamed 161	—
492	Delwood	Hancock Center	Rutherford Wal-Mart	—	Midday service only; runs Monday, Wednesday, Friday; Curb-to-curb paratransit service operating along fixed route; Renamed from 161	—
493	Eastview	Airport & Oak Springs	Downtown Austin	—	Midday Monday service only	—

Former special service routes
Rt.	Name	Created	Eliminated	Notes	Ref.
90	HEB Shuttle	May 1998	Feb 2001	Renamed 490	—
91	ACC Shuttle	Jan 1999	May 1999	Demonstration route	—
94	Day Labor Shuttle	—	Jan 1997	Feb 2000 revived as 499	—
207	Lakeline Shuttle	Aug 1996	Jan 1997	Replaced 205 and 206.	—
210	Hobby Shuttle	Jan 1999	Aug 1999	Demonstration route	—
401	Sunset/3M Shuttle	—	—	—	—
402	Sunset/3M Shuttle	—	—	—	—
420	Convention Shuttle North	—	—	—	—
421	Convention Shuttle South	—	—	—	—
422	Convention Shuttle Town Lake	—	—	—	—
424	Sunrise/3M/Travis Square Shuttle	—	—	—	—
425	Sunrise/3M/Travis Square Shuttle	—	—	—	—
430	Pease Elem & Kealing	—	—	—	—
431	Campbell Elem & Kealing	—	—	—	—
432	TX Academy & Kealing	—	—	—	—
434	Barbara Jordan	—	—	—	—
435	Texas Academy	—	—	—	—
440	Tech Ridge Circulator	—	—	—	—
445	New Life Shuttle	2019	2019	Ran only during SXSW 2019	—
451	Downtown/Saltillo Shuttle	—	Nov 2019	Weekday service while Downtown station closed; late night service on Fridays; eliminated after Downtown station reopened	—
455	Leander Shuttle	—	Aug 16, 2020	Saturday service only	—
460	Downtown – Congress	—	—	—	—
461	Downtown – Guadalupe	—	—	—	—
462	Downtown – Riverside	—	—	—	—
464	Capitol MetroRail Connector	—	Jun 3, 2018	Rush hour service; Replaced by 18	—
470	Tour the Town	—	—	—	—
470	Manor Flex	—	Jun 2019	Replaced by Pickup	
499	Day Labor	—	—	—	—

== CapMetro Express ==
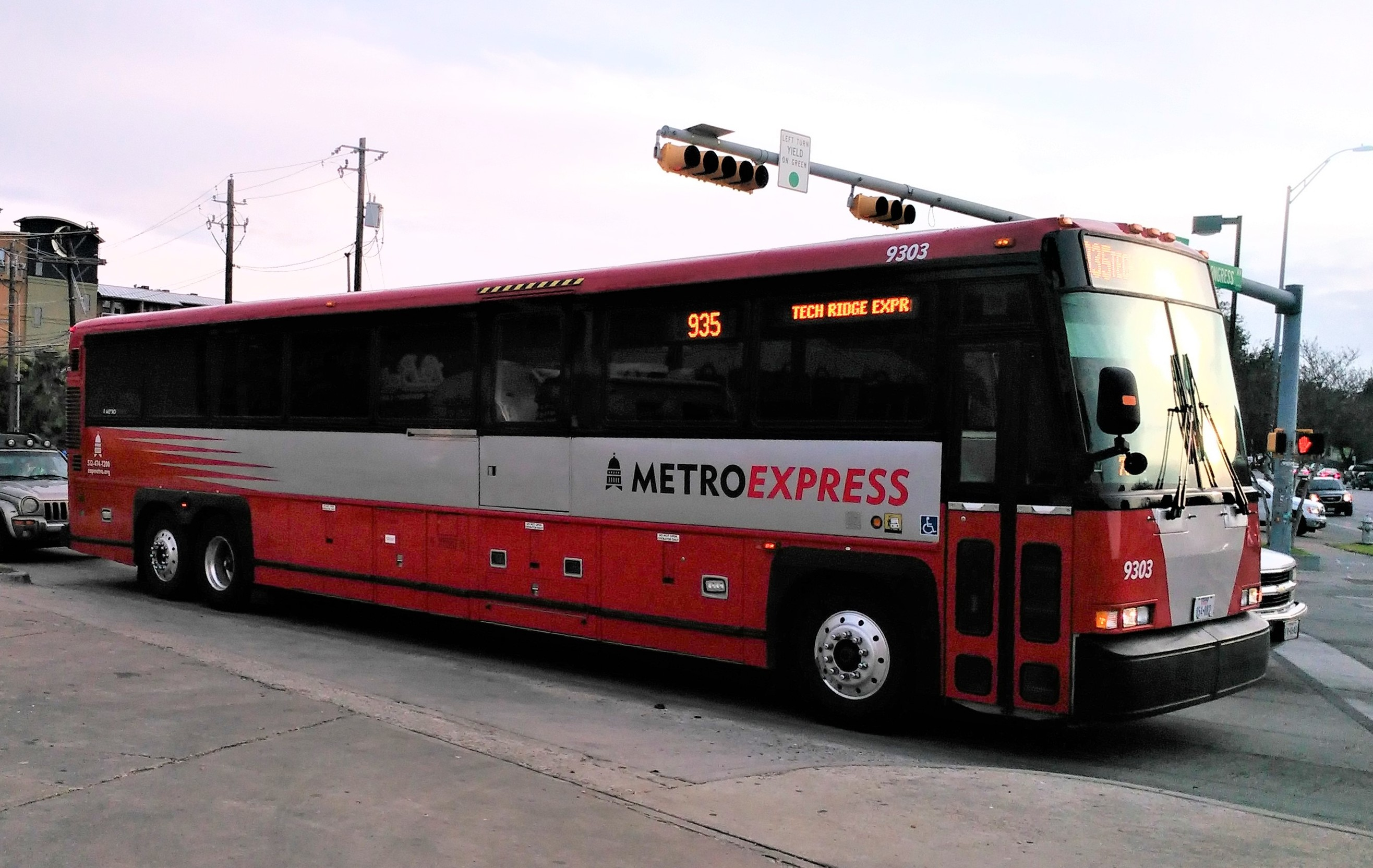
CapMetro Express bus in 2015

CapMetro's Express services are limited stop services that run between Downtown Austin and the far suburbs. Express routes are designated as routes 900–999, and are served exclusively by buses in the red "MetroExpress" livery (though on occasions they may be served by buses in the regular CapMetro livery as well).

CapMetro Express routes
Rt.	Name	Terminals Interlines		Created	Notes	Ref.
935	Tech Ridge Express	E Riverside at I-35	Tech Ridge Park and Ride: 135	May 2000	Renamed from 79; Rush hour service: southbound in morning peak, northbound in afternoon; No boarding except at Tech Ridge Park and Ride when traveling southbound	—
980	North Mopac Express	Dean Keeton at Speedway	Century Park at Ida Ridge	—	Three additional trips in each direction to Baghdad at Brown in Round Rock during peak hours; No boarding at points past Howard station traveling southbound	—
982	Pavilion Express	W 4th at Guadalupe	Pavilion Park and Ride	—	Rush hour and midday service: Rush hour service southbound in morning peak, northbound in afternoon; midday service both directions; No boarding at points past W 38th at N Lamar travelling in either direction	—
985	Leander/Lakeline Direct	San Jacinto at Dean Keeton	Leander Station via Lakeline Station	—	All day on weekdays; Saturday evening service until Saturday MetroRail resumed; No boarding at points past Lakeline Station traveling southbound	—
990	Manor/Elgin Express	W 2nd at Guadalupe	Elgin Depot	Aug 2000	Renamed from 103; Rush hour service: westbound in morning peak, eastbound in afternoon; Service between Manor Park and Ride and Elgin Depot provided by CapMetro on behalf of CARTS; passengers must pay additional CARTS fare when traveling further east than Manor Park and Ride in either direction	—

Former CapMetro Express routes
Rt.	Name	Created	Eliminated	Notes	Ref.
ENW	East-Northwest Express	—	Aug 1991	Partially replaced by 32.	
69 IRS	IRS/VA Express	—	Aug 2001	Eliminated due to low ridership	—
70 NEX	Northeast Express	—	Aug 1996	Renamed 103	—
71 LX	Leander Express	—	Aug 2001	Split into 982, 983, and 987	—
79 PX	Pflugerville Express	—	May 2000	Renamed 935	—
103 NEX	Northeast Express	—	Aug 2000	Renamed 990; Number later reused	—
211	Capitol Express (South)	Jan 1999	May 1999	Demonstration route	—
212	Capitol Express (North)	Jan 1999	May 1999	Demonstration route; Replaced by 101	—
970	Lantana Express	—	Jun 3, 2018	Revival of former 70; Rush hour reverse-peak service: southbound in morning peak, northbound in afternoon; Eliminated due to low ridership	—
981	Oak Knoll Express	—	January 14, 2024	—	—
983	North US 183 Express	—	Jan 2018	Replaced by 981, 982, and 987	—
984	Northwest Direct via IH35	—	—	Consolidated with 986 to form 985	—
985	Leander/Downtown Express	—	Aug 2001	Split into 984 and 986	—
986	Leander Direct via IH35	—	—	Consolidated with 984 to form 985	—
987	Leander/Northwest Express	—	January 14, 2024	—	—

== MetroRapid ==
In January 2014, CapMetro launched a bus rapid transit service branded "MetroRapid," utilizing articulated buses operating in shared lanes with automobile traffic. Service on the first route, MetroRapid North Lamar/South Congress (801), began on January 26, 2014. It replaced existing bus Routes 1L and 1M, as well as the 101 Express, which traveled along the same corridor.

A second route, MetroRapid Burnet/South Lamar (803), serves a total of 24 stations between The Domain and Westgate. Both the 801 and 803 drew citizen protest until premium fares were discontinued in 2017 and the 801 had also reduced frequency of the then operating 1L/1M.

== UT Shuttle ==
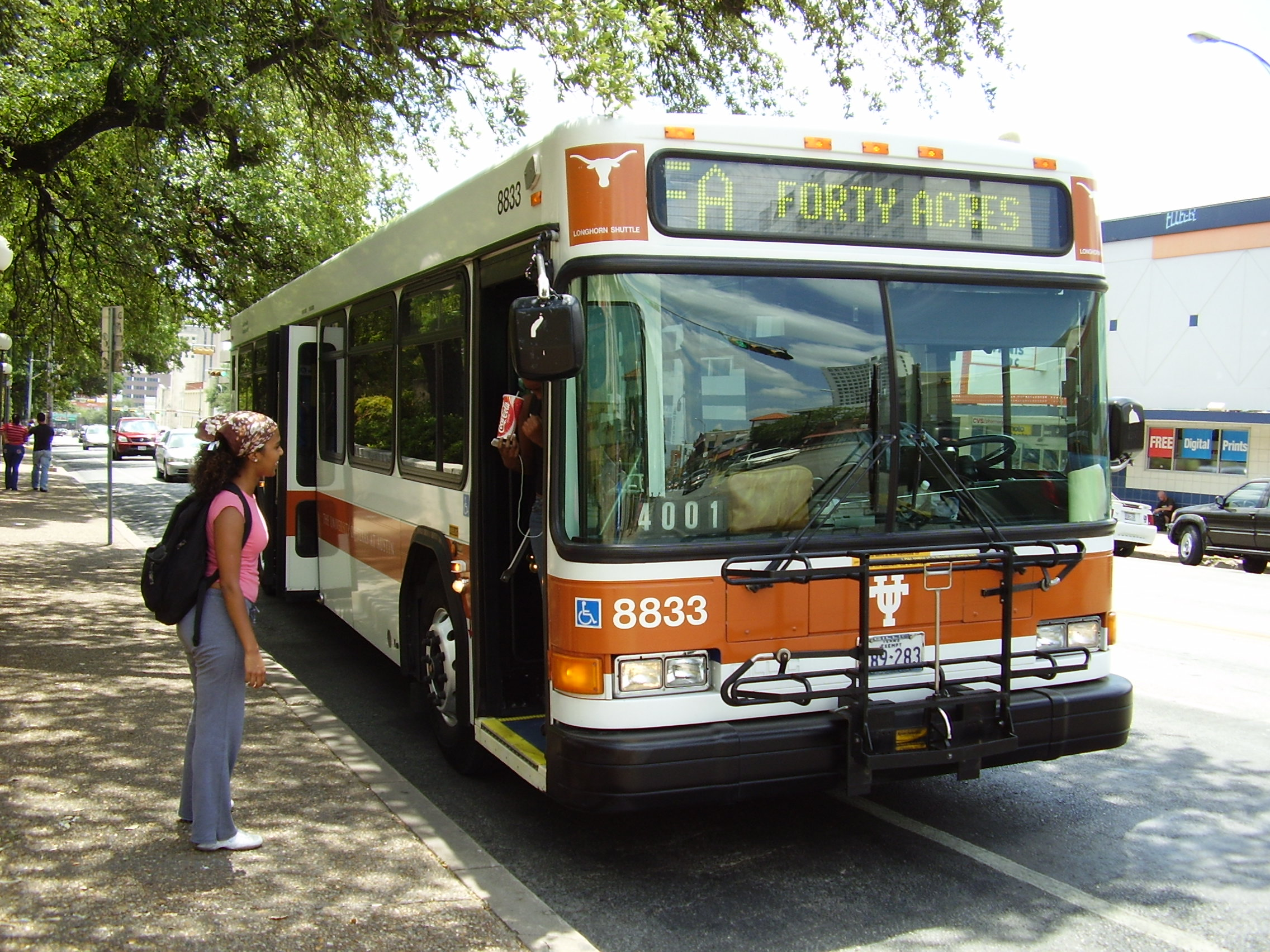
A CapMetro bus painted in University of Texas at Austin colors. The orange and white buses have now all been retired.

The University of Texas Shuttle system, operated by CapMetro, is one of the largest university transit systems in the United States. It comprises 10 routes and carries over 5.2 million passengers a year. UT students, faculty, and staff may ride the shuttles at no charge with a valid UT photo ID. Without a UT photo ID, normal MetroBus rates apply.

=== UT Shuttle history ===
CapMetro took over university shuttle operations in 1989. Formerly, service had been provided by private bus companies. Immediate changes included upgraded buses with air conditioning, but also lengthening headway on some routes.

In 1983, the University of Texas received six bids to manage the shuttle system. CapMetro entered into the picture in 1988, when the university contracted out to them. CapMetro, in turn, then subcontracted out to Laidlaw International, Inc., who had, up to that point, operated orange and white school buses for the university on a contractual basis. Rather than use Laidlaw's existing bus fleet, however, CapMetro used their own. In so doing, CapMetro brought air conditioning and wheelchair accessibility to the shuttle service for the first time. The transition, however, was not without controversy. Among the other contested issues was that these new shuttles didn't have a stereo system.

In 1991, CapMetro canceled its contract with Laidlaw and contracted out with DAVE Transportation, instead

Amidst allegations of union busting, in 1999, CapMetro canceled its then current contract and instead contracted out with ATC/Vancom, instead Six years later, in 2005, CapMetro, citing concerns over the comparatively low wages ATC/Vancom paid, negotiated a contract with First Transit to operate the UT shuttle buses.

=== UT Shuttle routes ===
The UT Shuttle system includes a number of routes during the University of Texas semester. They do not operate on Saturdays, except during finals. Since September 2014, numbered routes have been used exclusively at bus stops, though signage on buses may use either numbered or lettered signage.

Routes as of August 2025:

UT Shuttle
Route		Name	Terminals		Created	Notes	Ref.
No.	Let.	Name	Terminals		Created	Notes	Ref.
640	FA	Forty Acres	W 21st at Whitis	E 23rd at Robert Dedman	—	Circular service, runs clockwise; Formerly 54, then west half 54; Consolidated with 641 on August 18, 2024	—
642	WC	West Campus	San Jacinto at E 23rd	San Gabriel at W 25th	—	Circular service, runs counterclockwise; Formerly 50	—
656	IF	Intramural Fields	E 26th at San Jacinto	Guadalupe at W 51st	—	Formerly 56	—
661	FW	Far West	Dean Keeton at Speedway	Village Center	—	Formerly 55	—
663	LA	Lake Austin	Whitis at W 21st	Kermit at Jasper	—	Also serves Downtown Austin; Formerly 57	—
670	NR	North Riverside	E 23rd at San Jacinto	1300 Crossing Place	—	Merged with 671 on August 18, 2025	—
672	LS	Lakeshore	E 23rd at San Jacinto	Lakeshore at E Riverside	—	—	—

Former UT Shuttle routes
Route		Name	Created	Eliminated	Notes	Ref.
No.	Let.	Name	Created	Eliminated	Notes	Ref.
48	—	Red River/UT	—	—	Renamed 653	—
49	—	Parker Lane/UT	—	—	Originally #49 South Riverside/UT, renamed during the split which created #84 Burton Drive/UT.; Renamed 673	—
50	—	West Campus/UT	—	—	Renamed 642; Number later reused	—
51	—	Cameron Road/UT	—	—	Renamed 651; Number later reused	—
52	—	Royal Crest/UT	—	Jan 1994	Number later reused	—
52	—	Pickle Research Campus/UT	—	—	Created between January 1994 and July 1995 as #52 Balcones Research Campus/UT, renamed by 1996; Renamed 652; Number was reused	—
53	—	Enfield Road/UT	—	—	Renamed 662	—
54	—	Forty Acres/UT	—	—	Merged with 60 to form new 54 by fall 1996	—
54	—	Campus Loop/UT	—	—	Split into 640 and 641	—
55	—	Far West/UT	—	—	Renamed 661	—
56	—	Intramural Fields/UT	—	—	Renamed 656	—
57	—	Lake Austin/UT	—	—	Renamed 663	—
58	—	North Riverside/UT	—	—	Renamed 671	—
59	—	Wickersham Lane/UT	—	—	Originally #59 Pleasant Valley/UT; renamed when it no longer served Pleasant Valley; Renamed 675	—
60	—	East Campus/UT	—	1996	Merged into 54	—
80	—	Red River/Cameron Road/UT	—	—	Renamed 684	—
81	—	Intramural Fields/Far West/UT	—	—	Renamed 681	—
82	—	Burton Drive/Parker Lane/UT	—	—	Renamed 682	—
83	—	Forty Acres/East Campus/UT	—	Aug 1996	Eliminated when routes 54 and 60 were merged to form 54	—
84	—	Burton Drive/UT	—	—	Renamed 674	—
85	—	Wickersham Lane/North Riverside/UT	—	—	Renamed 680	—
641	EC	East Campus	—	Aug 18, 2024	Consolidated into 640	—
651	CR	Cameron Road	—	—	Formerly 51	—
652	PR	Pickle Research Campus	—	—	Formerly 52	—
653	RR	Red River	—	Jun 3, 2018	Formerly 48	—
662	ER	Enfield Road	—	—	Formerly 53	—
671	NR	North Riverside	—	Aug 17, 2025	Formerly 58; Merged with 670	—
673	PL	Parker Lane	—	—	Formerly 49	—
674	BD	Burton Drive	—	—	Formerly 84	—
675	WL	Wickersham Lane	—	—	Formerly 59	—
676	PB	Parker/Burton	—	—	—	—
682	BD/PL	Burton + Parker	—	—	Formerly 82	—
683	ER/LA	Enfield Road + Lake Austin	—	—	—	—
684	CR/RR	Cameron Road + Red River	—	—	Formerly 80	—
685	WL/CP	Wickersham Lane + Crossing Place	—	—	—	—
—	CL	Campus Loop	—	—	Formerly 83 FA/EC Forty Acres/East Campus then 54; Split into 2 routes	—
680	NR/LS	North Riverside/Lakeshore	—	—	Overnight; Formerly 680 NR/WL, formerly 85	—
681	IF/FW	Intramural Fields/Far West	—	—	Sunday afternoon and evening; Formerly 81	—

== Former services ==
=== Armadillo Express ===
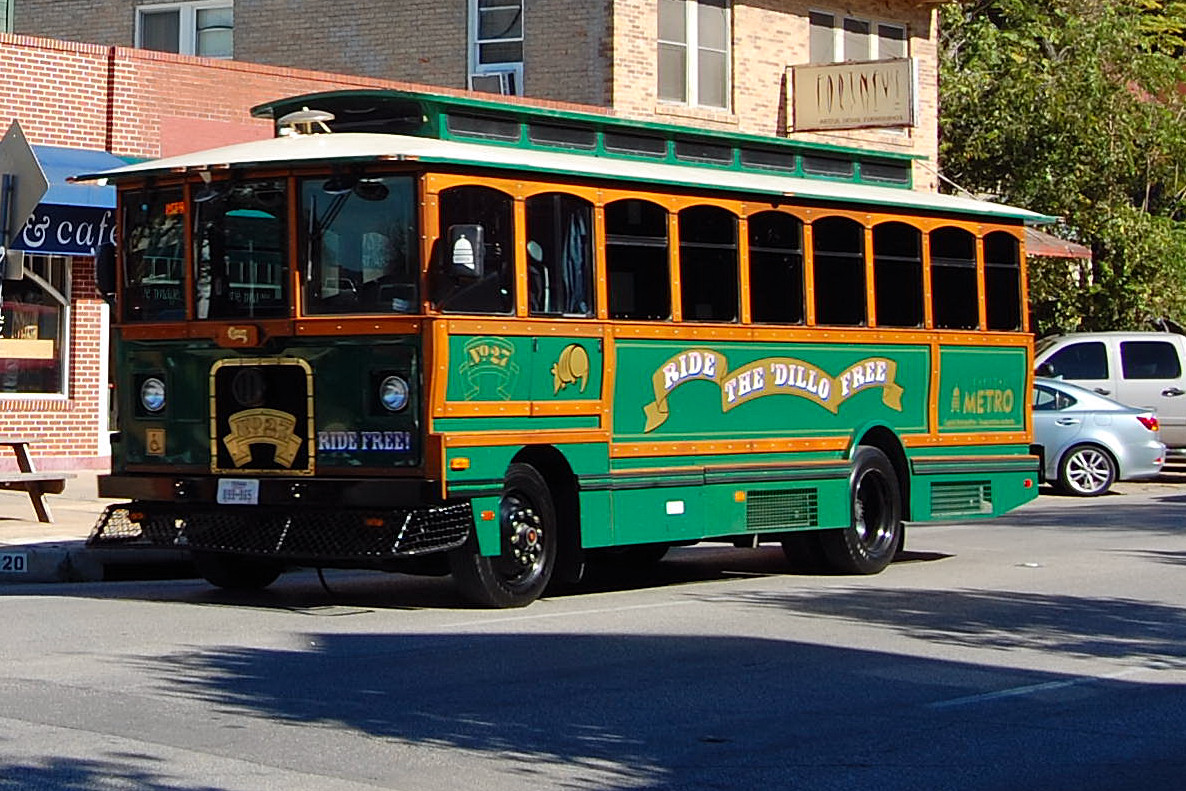
CapMetro's Dillo service used forest-green trolleys.

CapMetro's Armadillo Express service, colloquially known as the 'Dillo, was a free circulator service in downtown Austin. It was officially dedicated in May 10, 1984. In May 2000, the Dillo service went through a major restructuring. CapMetro ultimately began to charge a 50¢ fare in 2008. It was shut down in 2009 after over 30 years of operation due to low ridership. The service used forest-green trolley buses with an armadillo painted on the side.

Former Dillo routes
Rt.	Name	Created	Eliminated	Notes	Ref.
85	Convention Center/UT 'Dillo (Red Line)	—	1996	—	
86	Congress/Capitol 'Dillo (Blue Line)	—	May 2000	—	
87	ACC/Lavaca 'Dillo (Green Line)	—	May 2000	—	
88	Old Pecan Street 'Dillo	—	May 2000	Renamed 451 Silver 'Dillo	—
89	'Dillo Dash	January 1999	May 2000	—	—
450	Orange 'Dillo	—	—	—	—
451	Silver 'Dillo	May 2000	—	Renamed from 88 Old Pecan Street Dillo; Number later reused	—
455	Red 'Dillo	—	—	Number later reused	—
456	Gold 'Dillo	—	—	—	—
461	Yellow 'Dillo	—	—	Number later reused	—
462	Blue 'Dillo	—	—	Number later reused	—
463	Starlight 'Dillo	—	—	—	—
464	Moonlight 'Dillo	—	—	Number later reused	—

=== MetroAirport ===
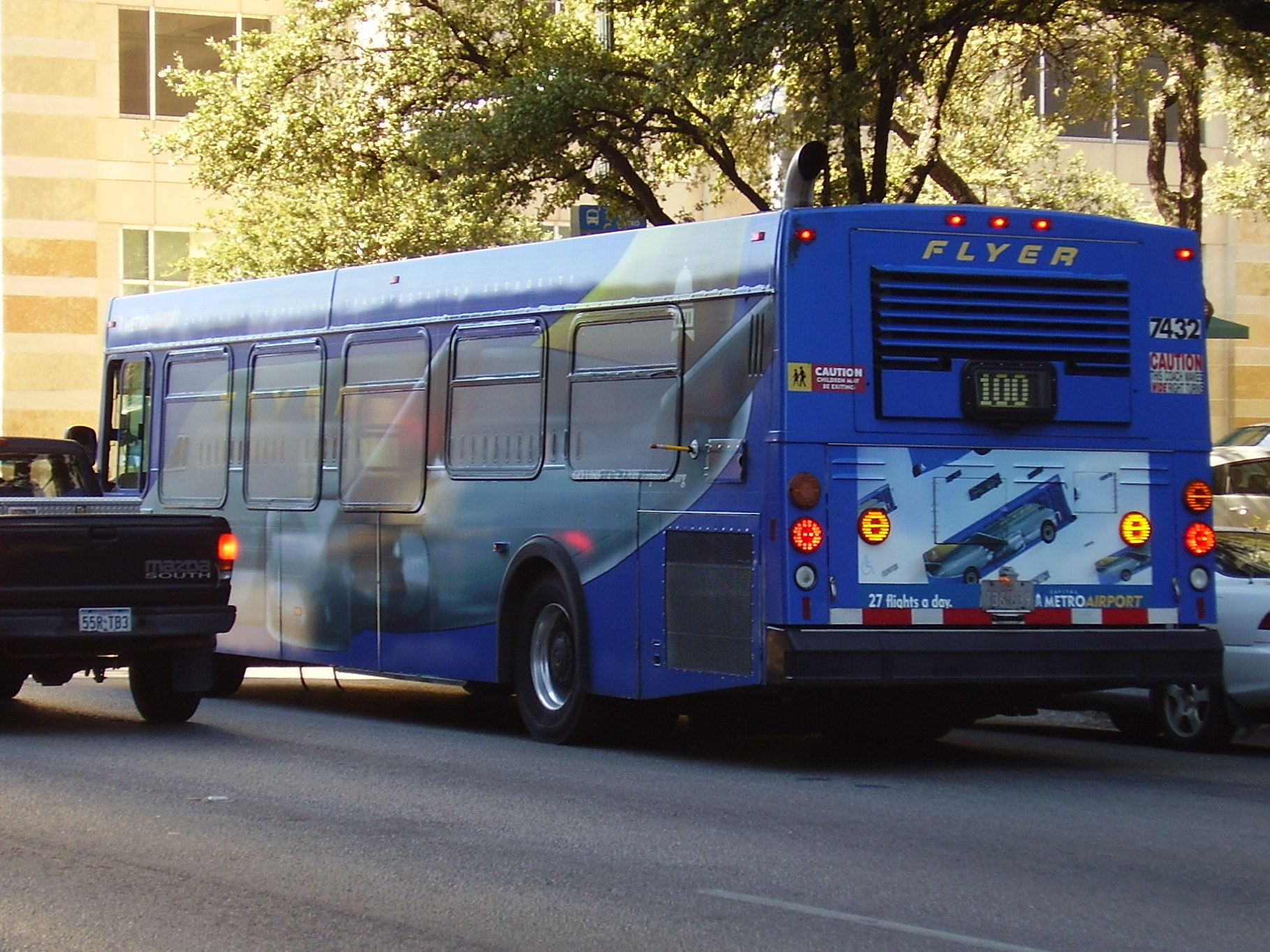
CapMetro Airport Flyer in its specialized livery

The MetroAirport service (sometimes called MetroAirport Flyer) was created when Austin–Bergstrom International Airport opened in May 1999. It was primarily served by buses carrying the "MetroAirport" livery, though may on occasion have been served by buses in the regular livery. The service was eliminated on June 3, 2018, and replaced by the extension of 20.

Former MetroAirport routes
Rt.	Name	Created	Eliminated	Notes	Ref.
100	MetroAirport Flyer	May 1999	June 3, 2018	—	

=== E-Bus ===
CapMetro had, since September 19, 2002, operated "E-Bus" routes, to ferry students between student residential areas to the 6th Street area. These buses ran only evenings and late nights on weekends and did not run in summer. The E in "E-Bus" stands for "eating and entertainment", and funding was initially provided by companies advertising on the bus. On April 1, 2010, the Daily Texan reported that, in an attempt to curb passenger unruliness, CapMetro had required students to swipe their student IDs before boarding and that UT would start paying for some of the services. These routes were suspended in 2020 due to the COVID-19 pandemic and were permanently discontinued on January 14, 2024.

MetroBus E-Bus services
Rt.	Name	Terminals		Created	Notes	Ref.
410	E-Bus/West Campus	Nueces at W 27th	Colorado at W 6th	—	—	—
411	E-Bus/Riverside	Crossing Place	Colorado at W 6th	—	—	—
412	E-Bus/Main Campus	Guadalupe at W 21st	Colorado at W 6th	—		

== See also ==
- Texas Department of Transportation
- Dallas Area Rapid Transit
- Metropolitan Transit Authority of Harris County
