= North Burnet/Uptown station =

Planned hybrid rail station in Austin, Texas

Coordinates: 30.3992°N 97.7141°W

North Burnet/Uptown

General information
- Location: Austin, TX
- Owner: CapMetro
- Platforms: 2 side platforms

Construction
- Parking: 200 spaces
- Accessible: Yes

History
- Opening: 2027

Future services
Preceding station	CapMetro Rail	Following station
Howard toward Leander	Red Line	McKalla toward Downtown
Location

North Burnet/Uptown station, (formerly known as Broadmoor station during planning) is an under construction CapMetro Rail hybrid rail infill station in Austin, Texas. The station is being built to improve access to The Domain, a major high-density business, retail, and residential center. Construction was expected to begin in September 2020 with service starting in 2022, but was then delayed until the station's groundbreaking on January 18, 2022, which would have pushed the opening date back to 2024. The project further stalled, with construction now expected to begin November 2025, with an expected opening in late 2027. Upon opening of the new station as well as the new McKalla station at Austin FC's Q2 Stadium, the nearby Kramer station is expected to close. Initially Brandywine Realty was going to contribute $12 million as was CapMetro, for a total estimated construction cost of $24 million, however, the costs have since ballooned to $37.3 million with CapMetro paying the difference.
