= Stacy Witbeck =

American construction company

- Formerly: Stacy & Witbeck
- Industry: Construction
- Founded: 1981
- Founder: David Stacy; Robert Witbeck
- Key people: Clayton Gilliland (President); George Furnanz (CEO)
- Revenue: $501 million (2024)
- Website: stacywitbeck.com/

Stacy Witbeck, formerly Stacy & Witbeck, is a construction company operating in the United States.

== History ==
Satcy Witbreck was established in San Francisco by David Stacy and Robert Witbeck in 1981.

In 2024 it was the 246th largest construction firm in the United States.

== Notable projects ==
- A and B Loop
- Brightline West in a joint venture with Herzog
- F Market & Wharves line in San Francisco, California
- FrontRunner track duplication in Utah
- MAX Green Line track laying in Portland, Oregon
- MAX Red Line track laying in Portland, Oregon
- MAX Yellow Line track laying in Portland, Oregon
- McKalla station, Austin, Texas
- Oklahoma City Streetcar
- QLine in Detroit
- Sixth Street Viaduct replacement project in a joint venture with Skanska
- Sonoma-Marin Area Rail Transit, California track relaying
- Stadler Rail depot in Salt Lake City
- Valley Metro Rail & Streetcar extension in Phoenix, Arizona
- Wilsonville Transit Center, Oregon.
- 2 Line Downtown Redmond extension in Seattle in a joint venture with Kuney Construction
