= McKalla station =

Hybrid rail station in Austin, Texas

McKalla
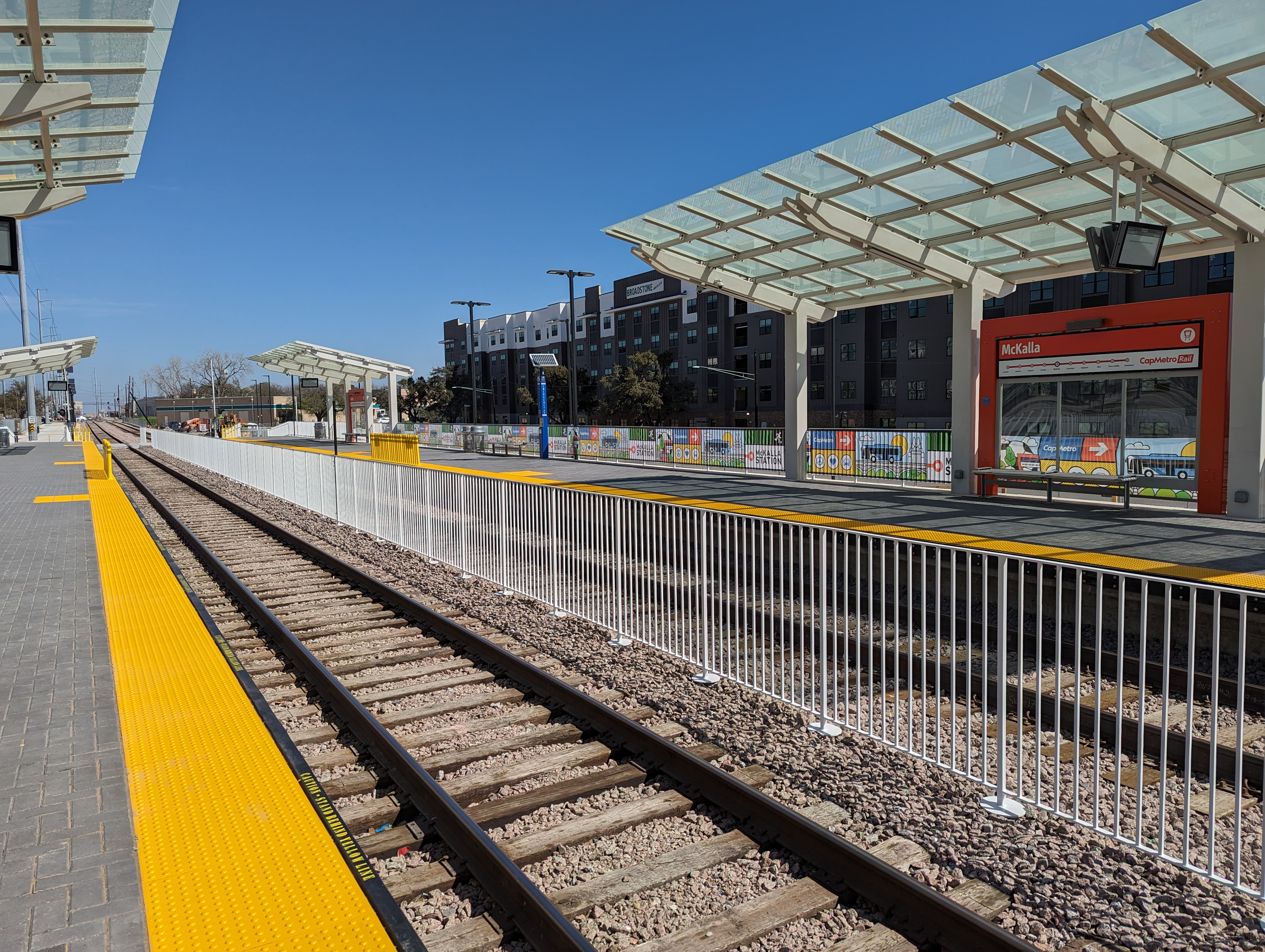
- McKalla station platforms

General information
- Location: Austin, Texas, United States
- Coordinates: 30.3878°N 97.7176°W
- Owner: CapMetro
- Platforms: 2 side platforms
- Tracks: 2

Construction
- Accessible: Yes

History
- Opened: February 24, 2024

Services
| Preceding station | CapMetro Rail | Following station |
|---|---|---|
| Kramer toward Leander | Red Line | Crestview toward Downtown |

Future services
| Preceding station | CapMetro Rail | Following station |
|---|---|---|
| North Burnet/Uptown toward Leander | Red Line | Crestview toward Downtown |
Location

McKalla station is a CapMetro Rail hybrid rail station in Austin, Texas, United States. The station was built to provide convenient access to Q2 Stadium. Ground broke on construction on July 18, 2022, and the new station opened on February 24, 2024, coinciding with the first home match of Austin FC's 2024 season. The station opened at 10:00 a.m. with a ribbon-cutting ceremony, with rides being free. Construction costs were estimated at $13 million, with total costs estimated at $60 million. The station is double-tracked, includes two regular service side platforms, with the southbound platform serving both northbound and southbound trains during special events and a gated walkway to the east side of the tracks. Soon after opening of the new station, along with North Burnet/Uptown station to the north, nearby Kramer station is expected to be closed. The station was designed and constructed by Stacy Witbeck. Finishing touches for the station are expected to be completed in April or May 2024.
