= Kramer station =

Hybrid rail station in Austin, Texas

Kramer
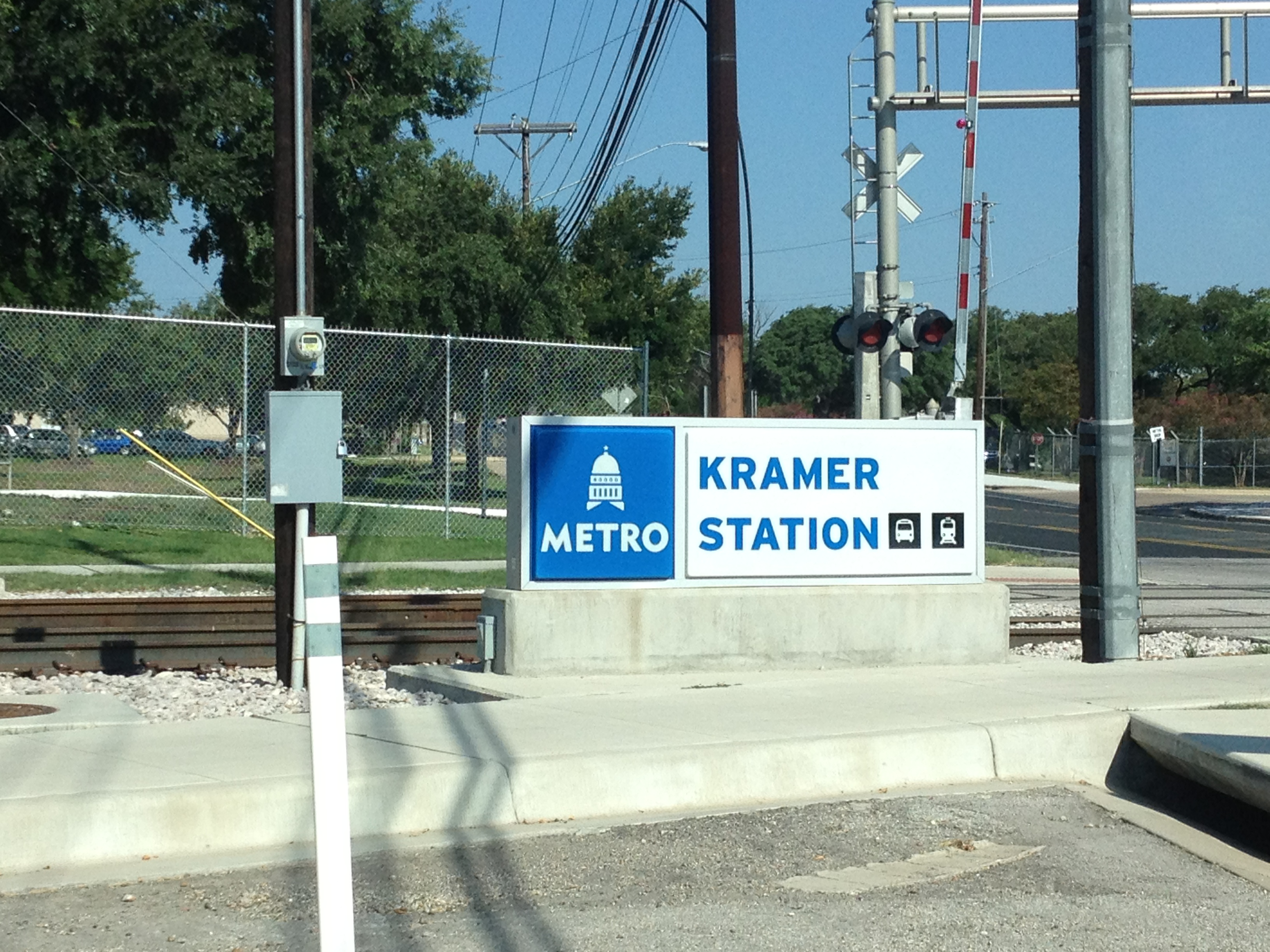

General information
- Location: 2417½ Kramer Lane; Austin, TX
- Coordinates: 30.392918°N 97.716624°W
- Owner: CapMetro
- Platforms: 2 side platforms
- Connections: MetroBus 392

Construction
- Parking: No
- Cycle facilities: Yes
- Accessible: Yes

History
- Opened: March 22, 2010

Services
Preceding station	CapMetro Rail	Following station
Howard toward Leander	Red Line	McKalla toward Downtown

Future services
Preceding station	CapMetro Rail	Following station
North Burnet/Uptown toward Leander	Red Line	McKalla toward Downtown
Location

Kramer station is a CapMetro Rail hybrid rail station in Austin, Texas. It is located in Northwest Austin near the corner of Kramer and Braker Lanes. At 1 mile walking distance, Kramer is the closest station to The Domain, a major high-density business, retail, and residential center.

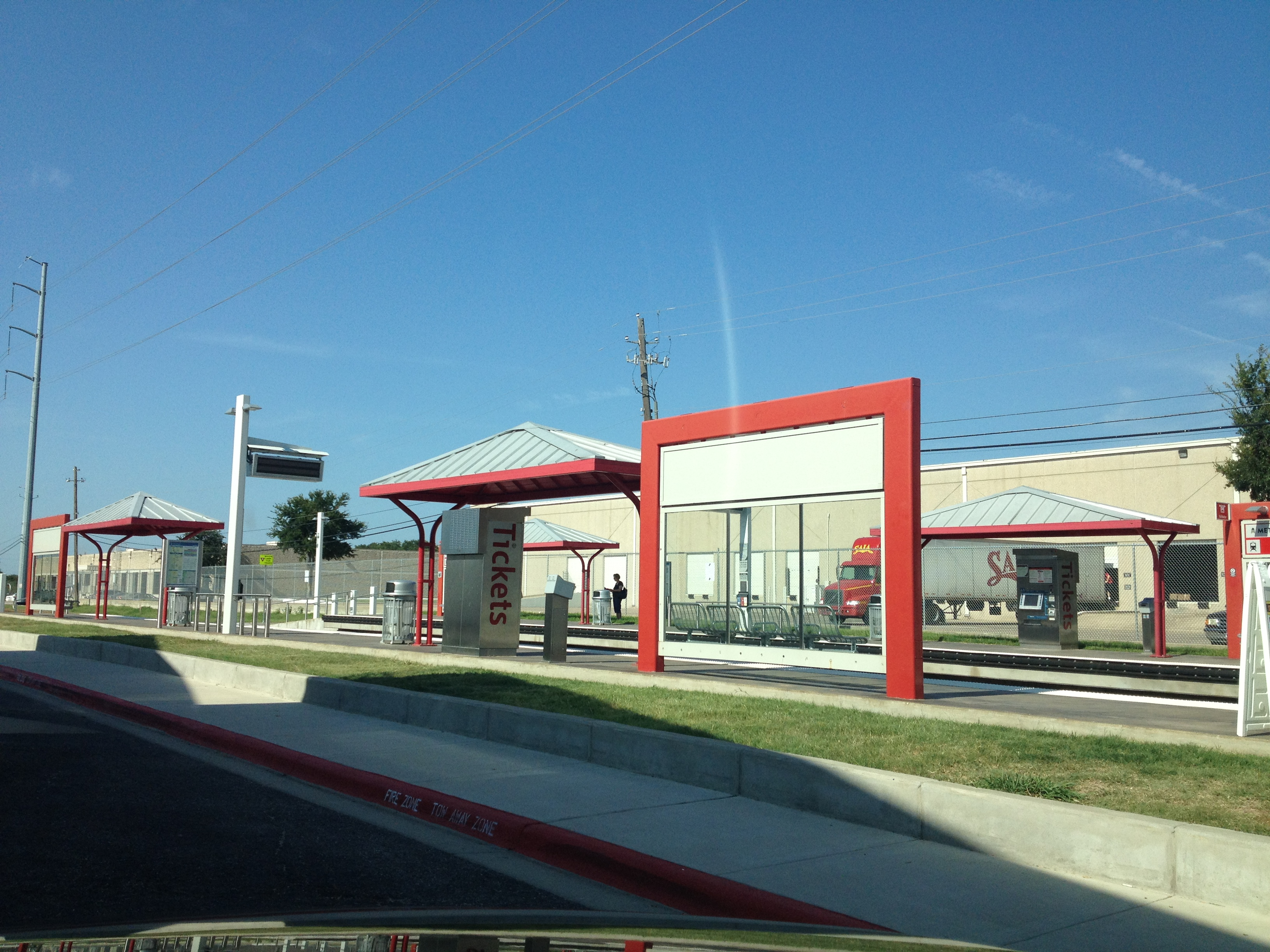
Kramer station platform

Kramer station is slated to close upon the opening of two new stations: North Burnet/Uptown station to the north and McKalla station to the south.

== Bus connections ==
- #392 Braker
- #466 Kramer
