= Lakeline station =

Hybrid rail station in Austin, Texas

Lakeline
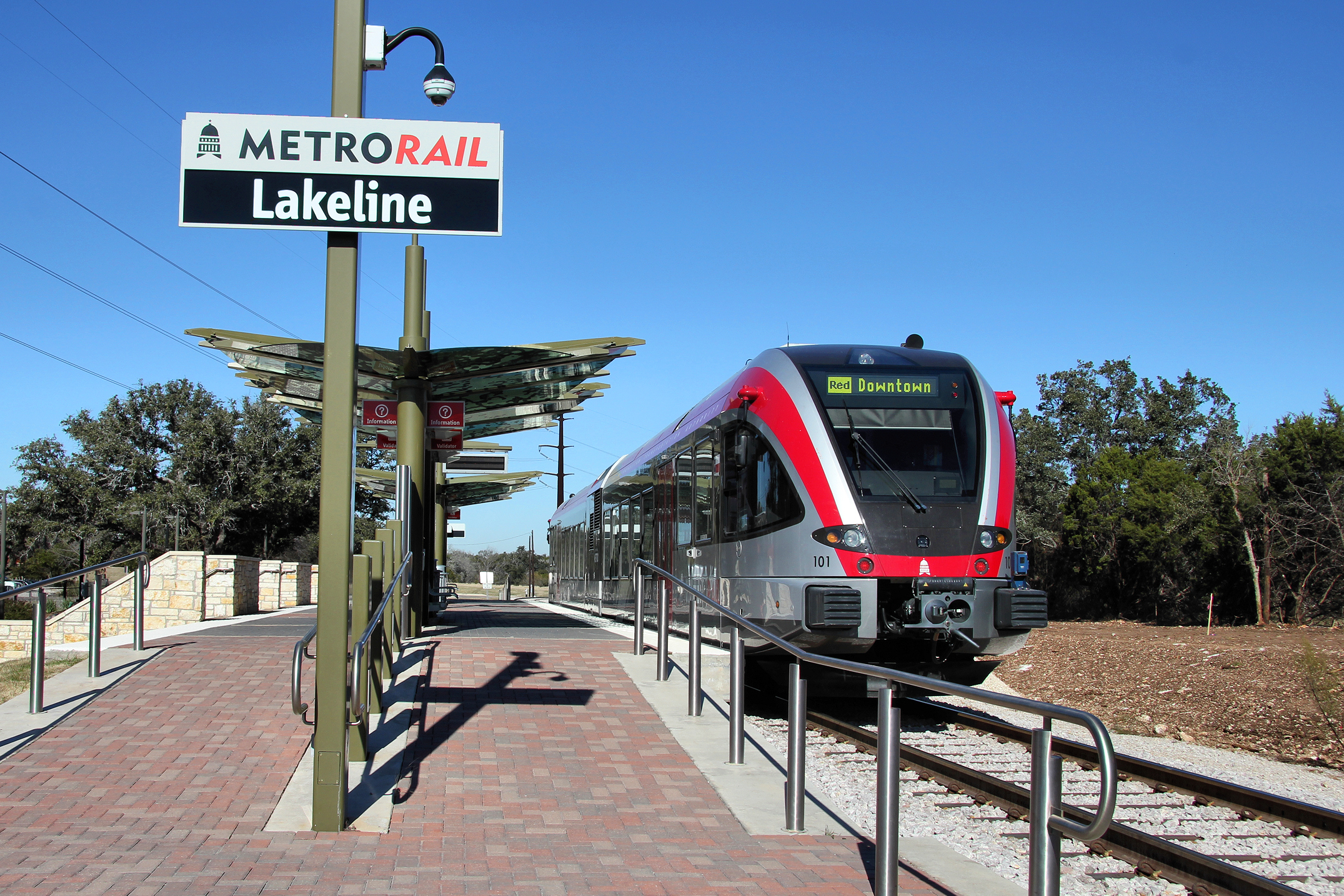

General information
- Location: 13625 Lyndhurst Boulevard; Austin, TX
- Coordinates: 30.481239°N 97.786388°W
- Owner: CapMetro
- Platforms: 1 side platform
- Connections: MetroBus 214, 383, 455, 985, 987; Greyhound Lines

Construction
- Parking: 500 spaces
- Cycle facilities: Yes
- Accessible: Yes

History
- Opened: March 22, 2010

Services
Preceding station	CapMetro Rail	Following station
Leander Terminus	Red Line	Howard toward Downtown
Location

Lakeline station is a CapMetro Rail hybrid rail station in Austin, Texas, located at the corner of Lakeline Boulevard and Lyndhurst Streets. It also is co-located with the Lakeline Park and Ride (formerly Northwest Park and Ride) and serves Lakeline Mall which is a mile away. Lakeline is one of two stations located within Williamson County alongside Leander station as opposed to Travis County which contains the other eight stations.

== Transit connections ==
- #214 Northwest Feeder
- #383 Research
- #985 Leander/Lakeline Direct
- #987 Leander/Lakeline Express
