= Leander station =

Hybrid rail station in Leander, Texas

Leander
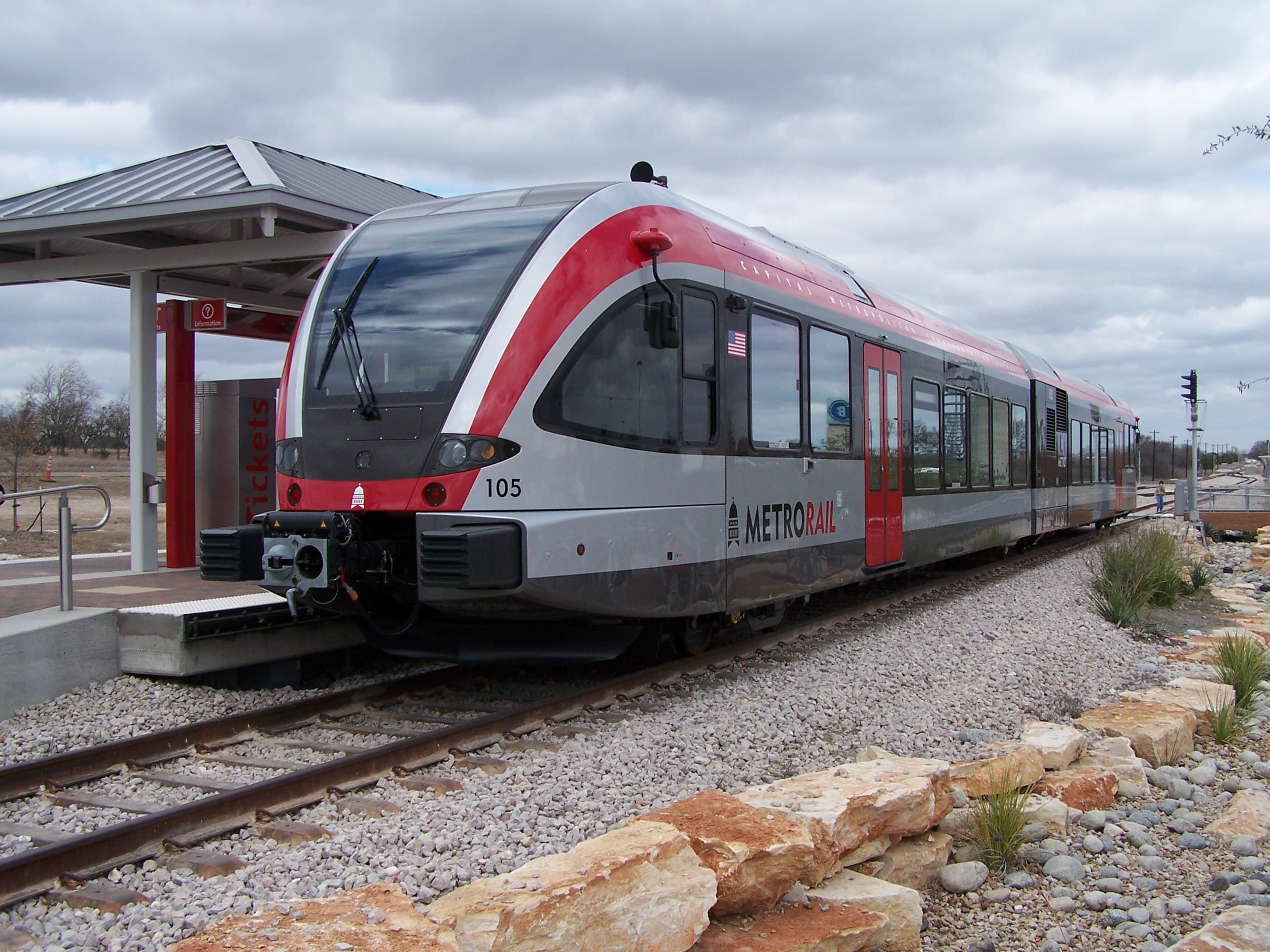

General information
- Location: 800 North U.S. Highway 183; Leander, TX
- Coordinates: 30°35′11″N 97°51′21″W
- Owner: CapMetro
- Platforms: Island
- Connections: CapMetro Express 985

Construction
- Parking: 600+ spaces
- Accessible: Yes

History
- Opened: March 22, 2010

Services
Preceding station	CapMetro Rail	Following station
Terminus	Red Line	Lakeline toward Downtown
Location

Leander station is a CapMetro Rail hybrid rail station and park and ride in Leander, Texas. The park and ride portion of it, designed by McKinney York Architects, was built in 2007 and is located on Highway 183 just north of FM 2243 and is the northern terminus of the Red Line. Leander station is one of two stations located within Williamson County alongside Lakeline station as opposed to Travis County which contains the other seven locations. Leander station includes a park and ride with 600 spaces.

== Bus connections ==
- #985 Leander/Lakeline Direct
- #987 Leander/Lakeline Express
