= Lago Vista High School =

Coordinates: 30.4412°N 97.9787°W

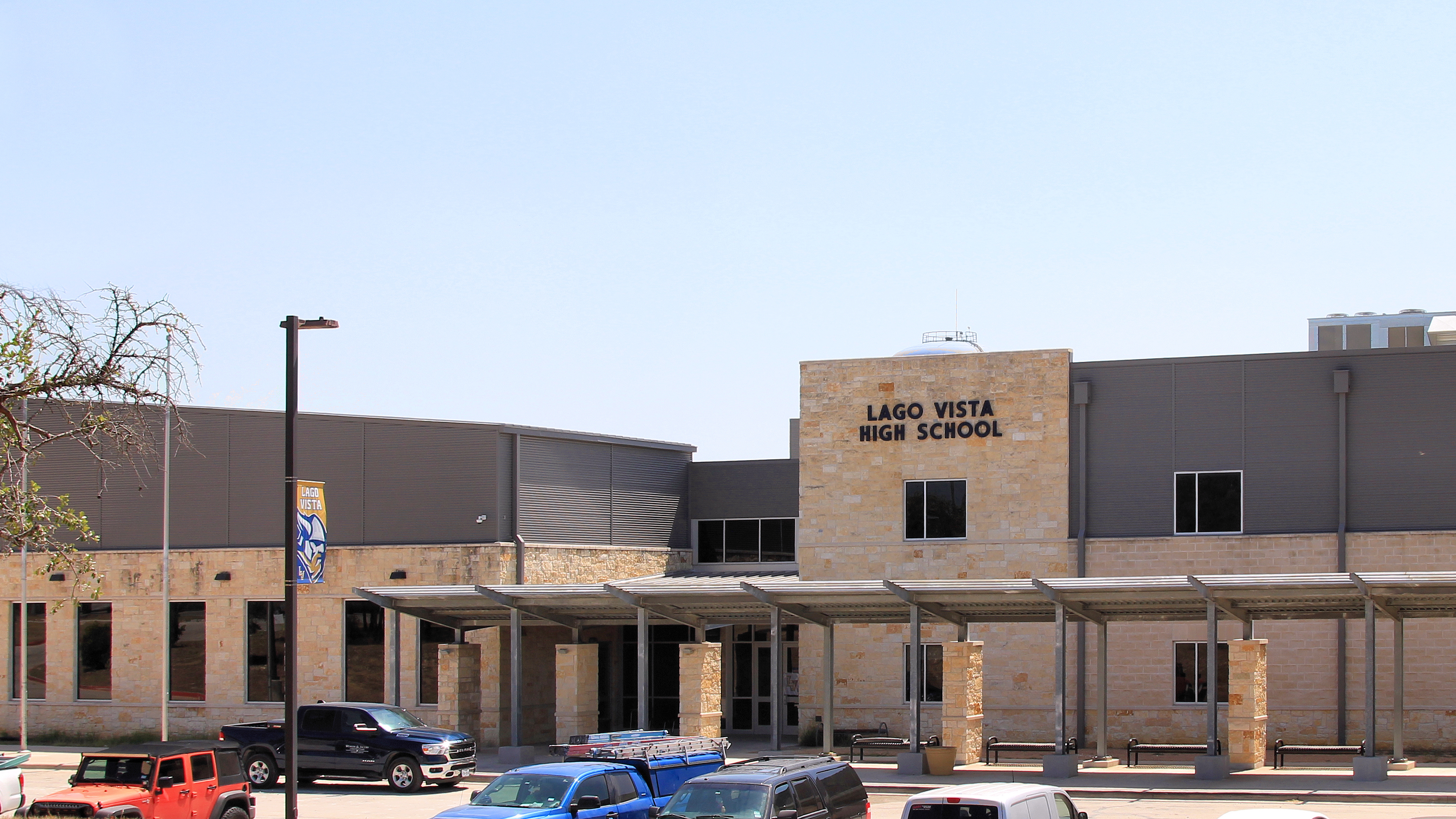

Location
- 5185 Lohman Ford Rd, Lago Vista, Texas 78645-4405; United States

Information
- School type: Public high school
- Established: 1976
- School district: Lago Vista Independent School District
- Principal: Janda Castillo
- Staff: 45.77 (FTE)
- Grades: 9-12
- Enrollment: 647 (2025-2026)
- Student to teacher ratio: 14.77
- Colors: Royal Blue & Gold
- Athletics conference: UIL Class 4A
- Mascot: Viking
- Yearbook: Valhalla
- Website: Lago Vista High School

Lago Vista High School is a public high school located in the city of Lago Vista, Texas, USA and classified as a 4A school by the UIL. It is a part of the Lago Vista Independent School District located in western Travis County. The High School serves all of Lago Vista, Point Venture, as well as portions of nearby Jonestown, Texas. The school district's current UIL Classification is 4A, Division 2.

In 2015, the school was rated "Met Standard" by the Texas Education Agency.

== Athletics ==
The Lago Vista Vikings compete in these sports -

Baseball, Basketball, Cheer, Cross Country, Football, Golf, Powerlifting, Soccer, Softball, Tennis, Track & Field, and Volleyball

=== National Titles ===
- Cheer -
  - 2022(3A)

=== State Titles ===
- Cheer -
  - 2019(3A), 2021(3A), 2022(3A)
- Girls Cross Country -
  - 2020(3A)
- Boys Golf -
  - 1987(1A)
- Girls Golf -
  - 1981(1A), 2004(2A)

== Theater ==
- One Act Play
  - 2015(3A)
