= Lago Vista, Texas =

- City
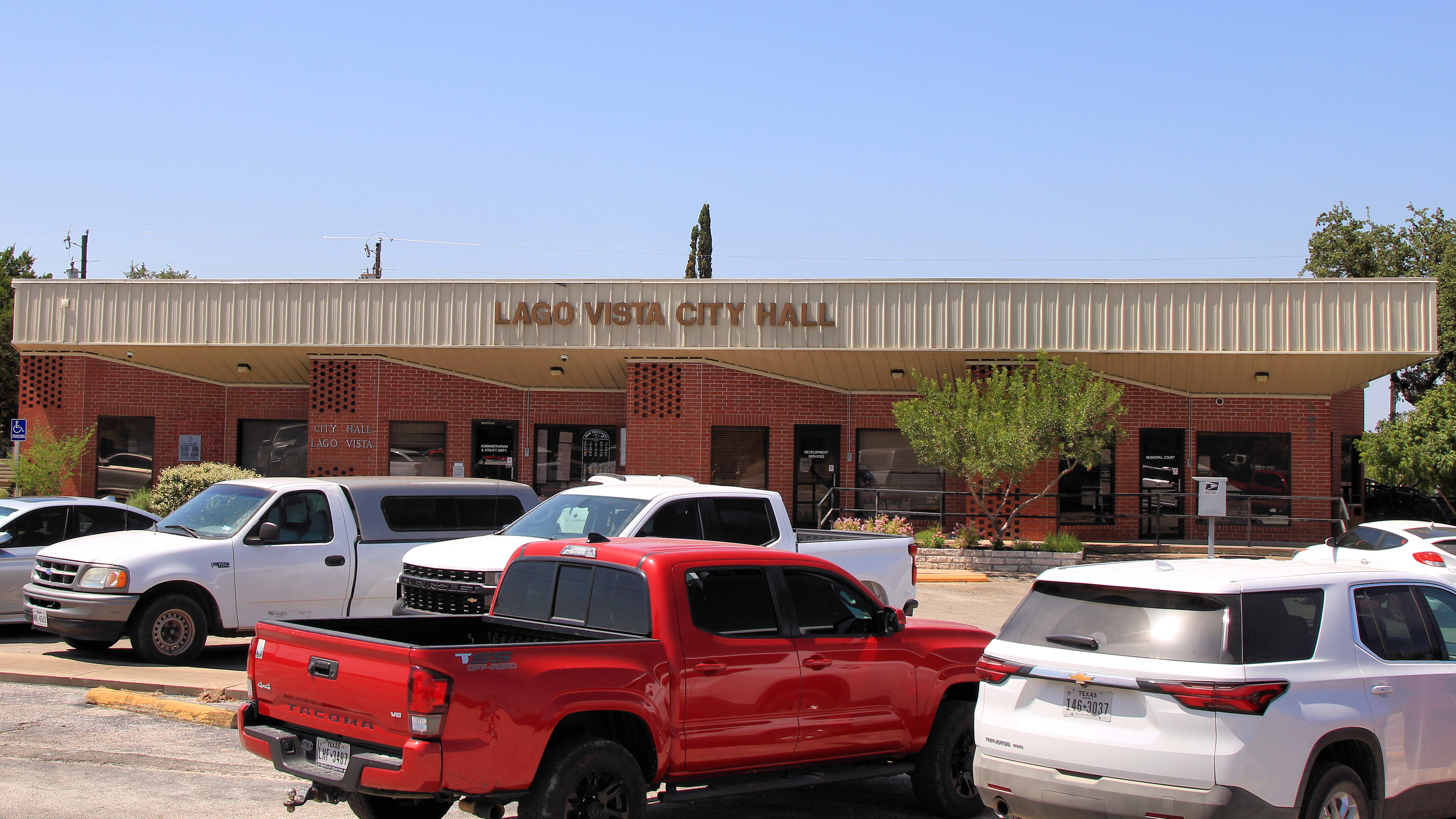
- City hall

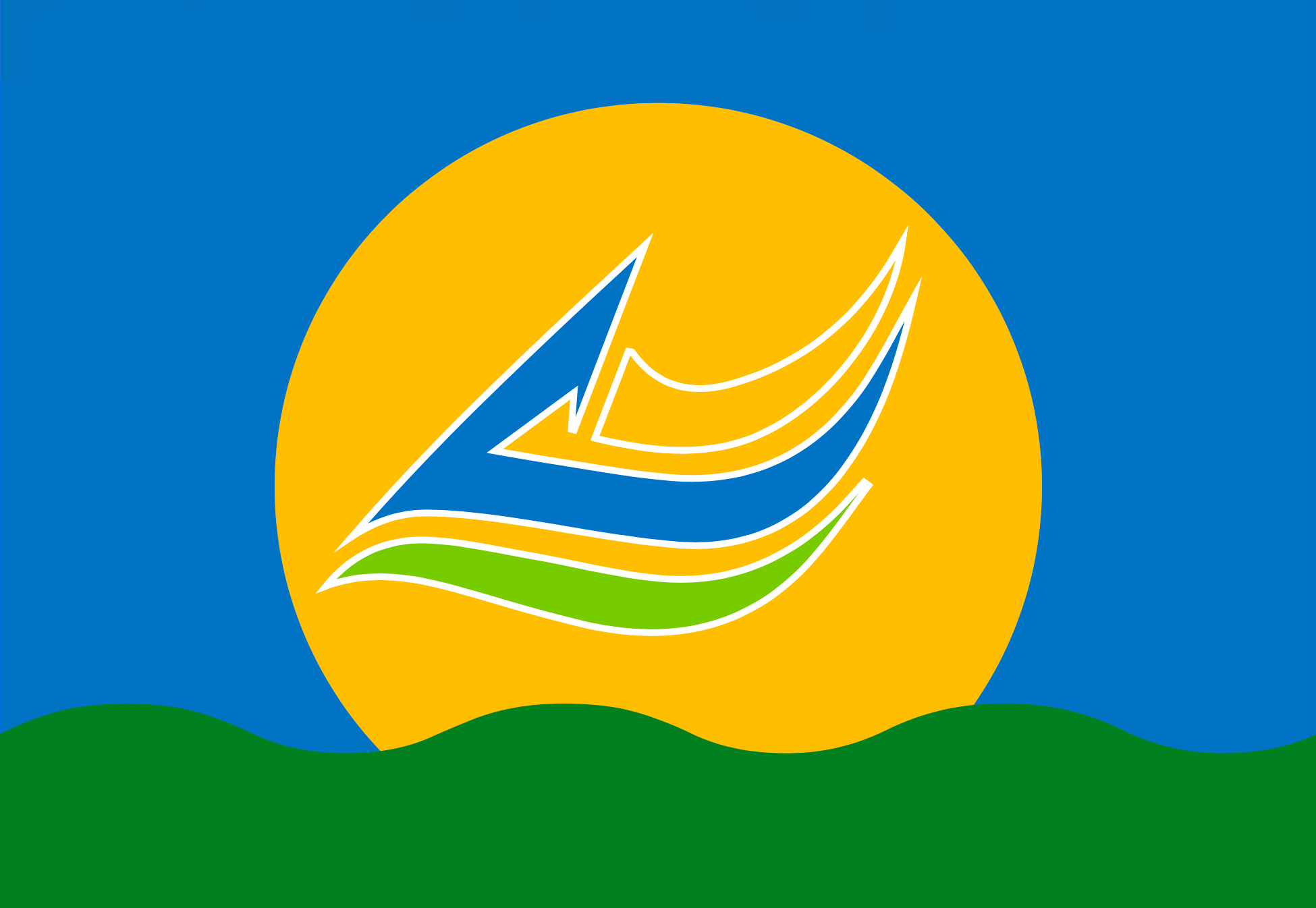
- Flag
- Motto: Live Like You're on Vacation
- Location within Travis County in Texas

- Location within Texas Location within the United States Location within North America
- Coordinates: 30°28′00″N 98°00′00″W
- Country: United States
- State: Texas
- County: Travis
- Established: 1984
- Incorporated: 1984

Government
  - Type: Council–manager
  - Mayor: Shane Saum
  - City Council: Norma Owen Paul Roberts Rob Durbin Paul Prince

Area
  - Total: 15.52 sq mi (40.19 km^{2})
  - Land: 14.33 sq mi (37.11 km^{2})
  - Water: 1.19 sq mi (3.07 km^{2}) 3.95%
- Elevation: 883 ft (269 m)

Population (2020)
  - Total: 8,896
  - Estimate (2025): 10,498
  - Density: 527.3/sq mi (203.59/km^{2})
- Demonym: Lago Vistan
- Time zone: UTC-6 (CST)
  - Summer (DST): UTC-5 (CDT)
- ZIP code: 78645
- Area codes: 512 & 737
- FIPS code: 48-40264
- GNIS feature ID: 2411594
- Airports: Rusty Allen Airport (RYW), Austin–Bergstrom International Airport (AUS)
- Major Roadways: RM 1431, Lohman Ford Road, Boggy Ford Road
- Transportation Provider: CapMetro Transportation Authority
- Website: lagovistatexas.gov

Lago Vista, Texas ("Lake View" in English) is a lakeside community located on the northern shores of Lake Travis. The city is located within Travis County, Texas, United States, and is less than 20 miles from downtown Austin. Much of Lago Vista is located on a peninsula that extends across 15.52 square miles of Texas Hill Country. The Colorado River runs adjacent to the city.

Travis County experienced a population increase of 26.9% between 2010 and 2020, while Lago Vista grew by 47.3% during the decade.

== Geography ==
Lago Vista is on the North Shore of Lake Travis, just under 20 miles (32 km) northwest of downtown Austin.

According to the United States Census Bureau, the city has a total area of 15.52 sq mi (40.2 km^{2}) of which 14.6 sq mi (38 km^{2}) is land and 0.6 sq mi (1.6 km^{2}) (3.95%) is water. The peninsular city sits adjacent to, and partially within, the Balcones Canyonlands. Lago Vista has rugged terrain with elevations ranging from 774 ft (236 m) above sea level at the lake shore to 1220 ft (372 m) above sea level near Rusty Allen Airport. The area is characterized by steep limestone hills and canyons, some of the highest in Travis County.

=== Climate ===
Lago Vista

Climate chart (precipitation, max. and min. temperature)
J	F	M	A	M	J	J	A	S	O	N	D
1.5 62 43	1.7 66 47	2.1 73 53	2.1 80 60	3.8 86 68	3.2 91 73	1.6 95 75	1.6 95 75	2.5 89 70	3 81 62	2.3 71 53	1.7 63 45
- █ Average max. and min. temperatures in °F
- █ Precipitation totals in inches
Metric conversion
J	F	M	A	M	J	J	A	S	O	N	D
38 17 6	43 19 8	53 23 12	53 27 16	97 30 20	81 33 23	41 35 24	41 35 24	64 32 21	76 27 17	58 22 12	43 17 7
- █ Average max. and min. temperatures in °C
- █ Precipitation totals in mm

== Demographics ==
Historical population
Census	Pop.	Note	%±
1990	2,199		—
2000	4,507		105.0%
2010	6,041		34.0%
2020	8,896		47.3%
2025 (est.)	10,498		18.0%
U.S. Decennial Census

Racial composition as of the 2020 census
Race	Number	Percent
White	7,132	80.2%
Black or African American	119	1.3%
American Indian and Alaska Native	58	0.7%
Asian	87	1.0%
Native Hawaiian and Other Pacific Islander	13	0.1%
Some other race	368	4.1%
Two or more races	1,119	12.6%
Hispanic or Latino (of any race)	1,368	15.4%
Total	8,896	

=== 2020 census ===
As of the 2020 census, there were 8,896 people, 3,747 households, and 2,053 families residing in the city; the population had grown by 47.3% since the 2010 census, and an average of 2.41 persons lived in each household.

The median age was 48.8 years, 18.3% of residents were under the age of 18, and 22.8% were 65 years of age or older; females made up 49.5% of the population, males 50.5%, and there were 100.0 males for every 100 females overall (96.8 males per 100 females age 18 and over).

92.8% of residents lived in urban areas, while 7.2% lived in rural areas.

There were 3,747 households in Lago Vista, of which 25.5% had children under the age of 18 living in them; 59.2% were married-couple households, 15.3% were households with a male householder and no spouse or partner present, and 19.6% were households with a female householder and no spouse or partner present. About 22.4% of all households were made up of individuals and 10.1% had someone living alone who was 65 years of age or older. There were 4,478 housing units, of which 16.3% were vacant, with a homeowner vacancy rate of 4.1% and a rental vacancy rate of 16.4%.

Approximately 93.4% of households have access to a computer and 86.7% of households have a broadband internet subscription. 94.5% of city residents have obtained a high school education or higher while 35.7% of Lago Vistans have obtained a bachelor's degree or higher.

The median income for a household in the city was $80,705 and the per capita income over the last 12 months was $47,058. The median value of owner-occupied housing units was approximately $282,700, while the median gross rent cost in the city was $1,209. Approximately 6.5% of Lago Vistans live at or below the poverty line.

The next population count in the city will take place during the 2030 United States Census.

== Economy ==
Lago Vista has experienced tremendous population and economic growth as a result of the ongoing increase in net in-migration into Travis County and the Greater Austin metropolitan statistical area. The region is considered a major center for high tech and is host to hundreds of offices and headquarters for technology companies. The Texas Hill Country is often referred to as "Silicon Hills" due to the high concentration of high tech companies in the area. As of 2022, Travis County ranked among the wealthiest counties in Texas; with a per capita income of $74,032, a median home value of $519,353, and a per capita investment income of $38,381.

== Arts and culture ==
=== Annual events ===
- March: La Primavera Bike Race
- March: Lago Vista Players
- April: Hill Country Singers
- April: Balcones Songbird Festival
- April/May: LAGO FEST Texas
- July: Fourth of July Parade and Fireworks
- August: Viva Lake Travis Casino Night
- October: National Night Out and Trunk-or-Treat
- November: Hill Country Singers
- December (First Monday): Christmas Tree Lighting Celebration and Trail of Lights

== Government ==
Lago Vista was incorporated in 1984 with a council-manager system of local government following attempts by the City of Austin to annex the area in the early 1980s. Lago Vista's seven council members serve two-year terms. The mayor and council members one, three, and five are elected in odd years. Members two, four, and six are elected in even years. The Lago Vista City Council meets regularly on the first and third Thursday of each month with additional Special Called Meetings. Tracie Hlavinka is the current city manager. The immediate past City Manager, Josh Ray, resigned in January 2020. City Hall, Municipal Court, and Lago Vista's government offices are located at 5803 Thunderbird Street in the city's business district.

=== Lago Vista 2030 Comprehensive Plan ===
In 2016, the Lago Vista City Council adopted the Lago Vista 2030 Comprehensive Plan as its comprehensive planning document for the next decade. The plan provides a snapshot of projected demographic trends, expected land use activity, transportation requirements, and overall neighborhood livability and quality of life.

=== State representatives ===
At the state level, Lago Vista is represented in the Texas House of Representatives (District 19) by Republican Ellen Troxclair. The city is represented in the Texas Senate (District 25) by Republican Donna Campbell. The city is represented in the Texas Board of Education (District 10) by Republican Tom Maynard.

=== Political affiliation ===
In the 2020 presidential election, Lago Vista supported Republican incumbent Donald Trump by margins varying from 60% to 65% compared to Democratic nominee Joe Biden. In the House of Representatives, Lago Vista is served by Republican Roger Williams as part of Texas's 25th congressional district.

== Education ==
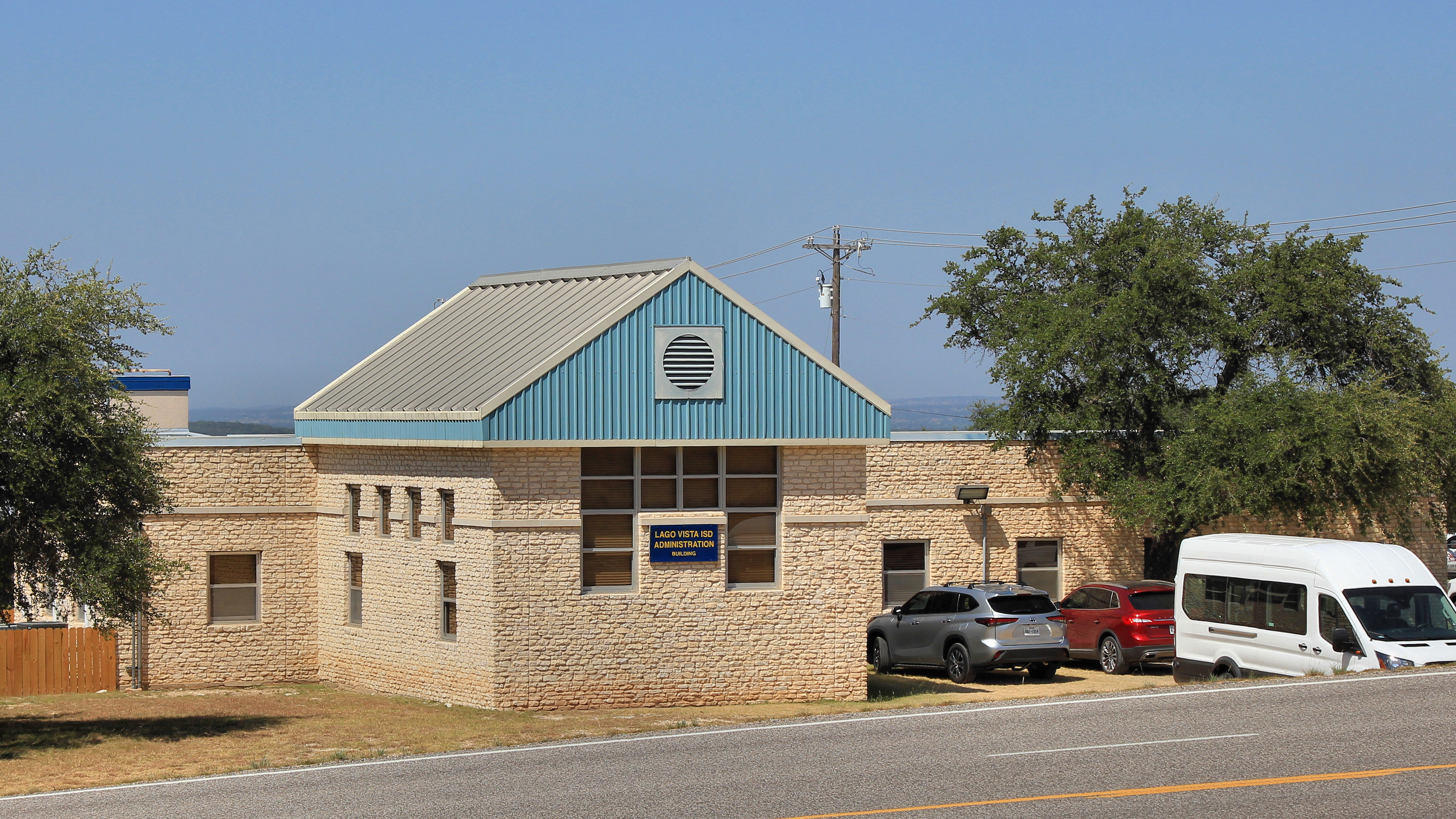
Lago Vista ISD headquarters

Almost all of Lago Vista is in the Lago Vista Independent School District, with a portion of the city limits extending to the Marble Falls Independent School District. The former operates Lago Vista High School.

The majority of Travis County, including portions in Lago Vista ISD, are in the Austin Community College district.

The largest nearby universities serving the Lago Vista area are located in neighboring Austin. Austin is home to the University of Texas at Austin, the flagship institution of the University of Texas System with over 40,000 undergraduate students and 11,000 graduate students.

== Infrastructure ==
=== Water ===
The City Council is in the process of planning for large expansions of both the wastewater and drinking water facilities. A request for qualifications (RFQ) for engineering design to expand the existing wastewater plant was published on February 13, 2024 to expand the plant from 1.0 million gallons per day (MGD) to 1.5 MGD. The RFQ for engineering design to expand Water Treatment Plant #3 from 2.0 MGD to 6.0 MGD was published on March 27, 2025. The 2024 Wastewater Master Plan report and 2025 Water Master Plan report note that the City wastewater connections could grow to 20,386 connections by buildout and the drinking water connections could grow to 19,801 connections by buildout. On December 3, 2024, Lago Vista City Councilman Shane R. Saum led a meeting at the White House with the President's Intergovernmental Affairs staff to discuss funding needs for these expansion projects and the larger concerns across Texas of how smaller municipalities are going to fund water projects.

=== Transportation ===
==== Roadways ====
RM 1431 is the main artery road providing access into Lago Vista.

==== Public transportation ====
The Capital Metropolitan Transportation Authority (CapMetro) is a transportation provider based in Austin that operates local bus services between Lago Vista and varying transfer points across the greater Austin area. Route 214 operates between Lago Vista and Lakeline Station in northwestern Austin (local fares apply). CapMetro also offers an on-demand public transportation rideshare service in Lago Vista called Pickup which was developed by Via. In 2025, during the 89th Texas Legislature, Lago Vista City Councilman Shane R. Saum helped lead legislative efforts to change how the "net financial obligation" was calculated for certain municipalities that withdrew from rapid transit authorities like CapMetro. Rep. Ellen Troxclair filed HB 3643 which would have changed the fee from a population-based calculation of a municipalities share of CapMetro's sizable financial obligations across its entire service area to a fee based on CapMetro's tangible assets that would be left behind in the community after a withdrawal. HB 3643 was left pending in the Transportation subcommittee after a public hearing on April 28, 2025.

==== Airports ====
Rusty Allen Airport (RYW) is a municipal single runway airport on the northern edge of the city, though the airport is exclusively a general aviation airport. Regularly scheduled commercial air services' closest link to Lago Vista is at Austin–Bergstrom International Airport.

== Media ==
The main daily newspaper representing the Austin metropolitan area (which includes the city of Lago Vista) is the Austin-American Statesman. Other regional publications and newspapers in the area include: Austin 360, Austin Business Journal, Austin Chronicle, Austin Monitor, Community Impact Newspaper, El Mundo, Hill Country News, do512, and the North Shore Beacon.

Commercial radio stations in the Lago Vista area include KASE-FM (country), KVET (sports), KVET-FM (country), KKMJ-FM (adult contemporary), KLBJ (talk), KLBJ-FM (classic rock), KJFK (variety hits), KFMK (contemporary Christian), KOKE-FM (progressive country) and KPEZ (rhythmic contemporary). KUT-FM is the leading public radio station in Texas and produces the majority of its content locally. KOOP (FM) is a volunteer-run radio station with more than 60 locally produced programs. Additionally, 1670 AM (LagoRadio) streams music from the 1960s, 1970s, and 1980s directly from Lago Vista and provides updates on important happenings in the North Shore communities (Lago Vista, Jonestown and Point Venture) of Lake Travis.

Network television stations (affiliations in parentheses) include KTBC (Fox O&O), KVUE (ABC), KXAN (NBC), KEYE-TV (CBS), KLRU (PBS), KNVA (The CW), KBVO (MyNetworkTV), and KAKW (Univision O&O).
