= Travis Parker =

American snowboarder

Travis Parker is a 49 year old professional snowboarder. Originally from Jonestown, Texas, his sponsors have included Capita Super, K2 Snowboards, DC Boots, Airblaster, Union Bindings, Level, Lifetime, and Bluebird. In 2005, Parker started riding for Capita, having left longtime sponsor K2. At the end of the 2009 season, Parker quit most of his sponsors, reputedly to become a sushi chef, and dropped out of the snowboarding world. Ahead of the 2011 season, it was announced that Travis was once again riding for K2. Travis is known for his original riding style and approach to snowboarding, including vowing to ride switch for the entire 2009 season.

Parker had a pro-model board for several years while on K2, the Parka, and helped Capita develop the Unorthodox (in subsequent seasons known as the Shapeshifter) board, notable for having a cutaway at both nose and tail.

Parker featured in a number of Totally Board films. He was a central part of Robot Food, and featured in all three of their films (Afterbang, 2003, Lame, 2004, and Afterlame, 2005). Subsequently, he embarked on a series of films which differed greatly from traditional snowboard films. In BikeCar (Fountaincat, 2007), Parker, Louie Fountain and Scotty Witlake cycle through the Pacific Northwest in a homemade pedal-driven vehicle, riding at such locations as Mount Bachelor. In 2011's December webseries, he and Andrew Crawford travel through eastern Europe snowboarding mainly at small or obscure locations, including Zakopane in Poland. The film also features Marco Grilc. Parker also features in The Gap Session (BlankPaper, 2006) and DC Mountain Lab. His return to professional snowboarding was featured in the movie Respect Your Elders (Airblaster/K2 Snowboarding, 2010).

In 2004 Travis founded Snowdays Foundation with educator Patrick Edwards. Snowdays Foundation is an all-volunteer organization dedicated to youth empowerment through snowboarding. In 2005, Parker auctioned part of his snowboard collection; a portion of the proceeds went to Snowdays.

Parker is a co-founder and owner of Airblaster, a snowboarding apparel company.

In 2018, Parker was interviewed by The Snowboarder's Journal, where he was candid about his lifelong struggles with mental health, including being diagnosed with type 2 bipolar disorder.
