= Rusty Allen Airport =

Airport in Texas, United States of America

Lago Vista, Texas, Rusty Allen Airport
- IATA: none; ICAO: KRYW; FAA LID: RYW

Summary
- Airport type: Municipal
- Serves: Greater Austin
- Location: Travis County, Texas
- Elevation AMSL: 1,231 ft (375 m)
- Coordinates: 30°29′55″N 097°58′10″W

Map
- Location within Texas

Runways
Direction	Length		Surface
Direction	ft	m	Surface
15/33	3,808	1,161	Asphalt/Treated

Statistics (2020)
- Aircraft operations: 38,000
- Based aircraft: 60
- Source: Federal Aviation Administration

Lago Vista, Texas, Rusty Allen Airport (ICAO: KRYW, FAA LID: RYW) is a publicly owned, municipal airport located in unincorporated Travis County, Texas, United States. It is 2 miles (3.2 km) northeast of the central business district of Lago Vista and is northwest of Austin.

== History ==
The airport was first established in 1951 as the Bar K Airport with an East-West aligned caliche runway. By the early 1970s, the runway had been realigned to the present RW15-33 and an asphalt surface with lighting.

The airport became municipally owned on August 25, 1994, and in October 1994, the airport name was changed to "Lago Vista, Texas, Rusty Allen Airport" to honor the long-time community leader and former mayor who has been involved in every major improvement for over 20 years. Rusty Allen and George Eeds owned a 1942 Piper L-4Cub used for emergency stretcher evacuation during World War II.

In September 2005, the airport was the center of operations for relief flights for victims of Hurricane Katrina in Louisiana and Mississippi. Small planes from across the United States and even Mexico landed at the airport to pick up essential supplies, which were directed to outlying communities not initially being served by government agency relief efforts. Lago Vista was the only General Aviation Center (GAC) airport in the country to support such flights.

== Facilities and aircraft ==
Lago Vista, TX, Rusty Allen Airport covers an area of 50 acres (20 ha) at an elevation of 1,231 feet (375 m) above mean sea level and has one runway. Runway 17/35 has a 3,808 x 50 ft (1,161 x 15 m) treated asphalt pavement.

For the 12-month period ending May 12, 2020, the airport had 38,000 general aviation aircraft operations, an average of 104 per day. At that time there were 60 aircraft based at this airport: 88% single-engine, 8% multi-engine, 3% helicopter and 2% glider.

CTAF is 122.725. There is self-serve 100LL fuel available at the airport.

== See also ==
- List of airports in Texas
