= Lago Vista Independent School District =

School district in Texas, United States

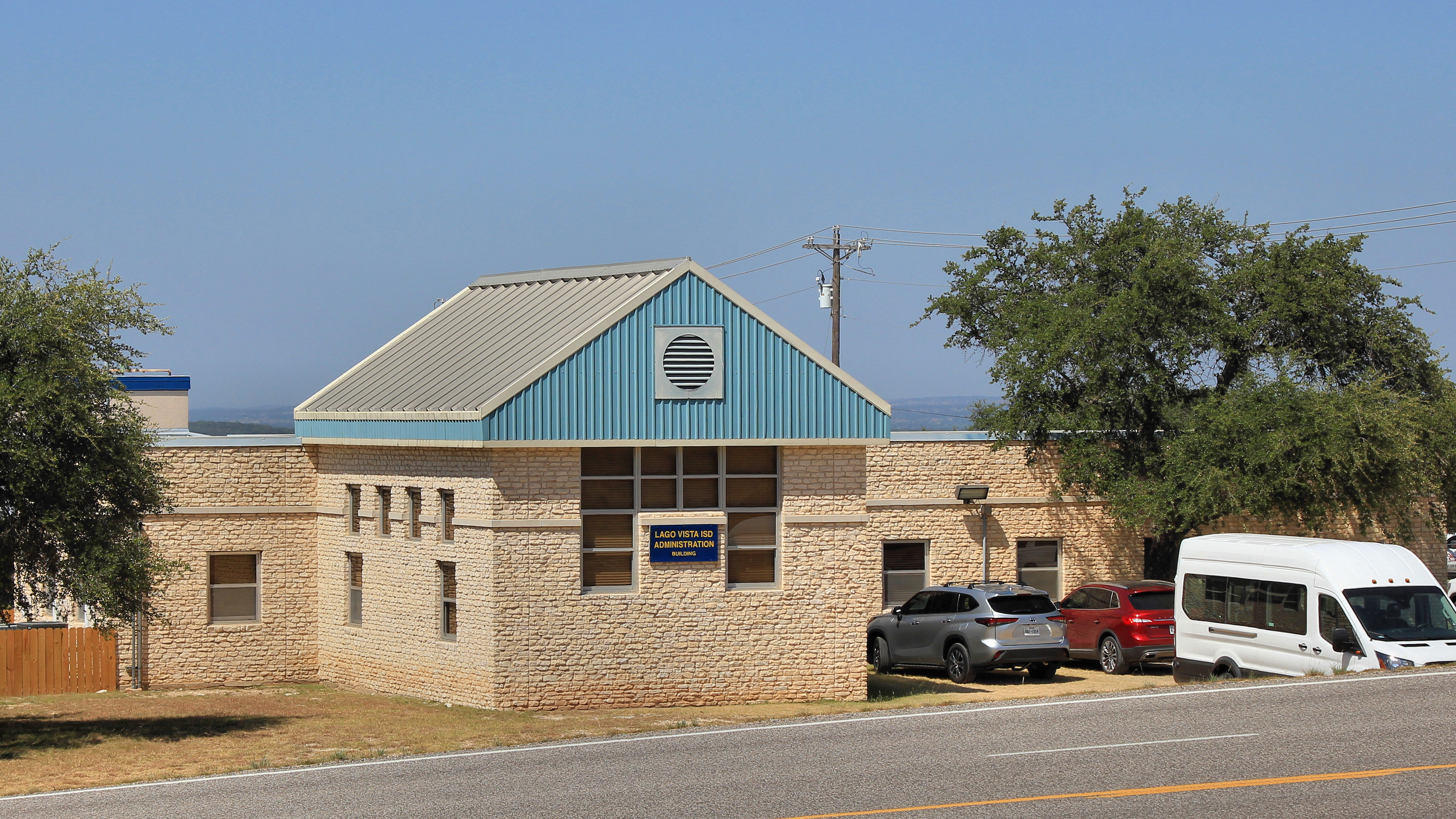
- The district headquarters building

Address
- 8039 Bar K Ranch Road Lago Vista, Texas, 78645; United States

District information
- Grades: PK–12
- Schools: 4
- NCES District ID: 4826400

Students and staff
- Students: 1,873 (2024-25)
- Teachers: 130.64 (on an FTE basis)
- Student–teacher ratio: 14.13:1

Other information
- Website: www.lagovistaisd.net

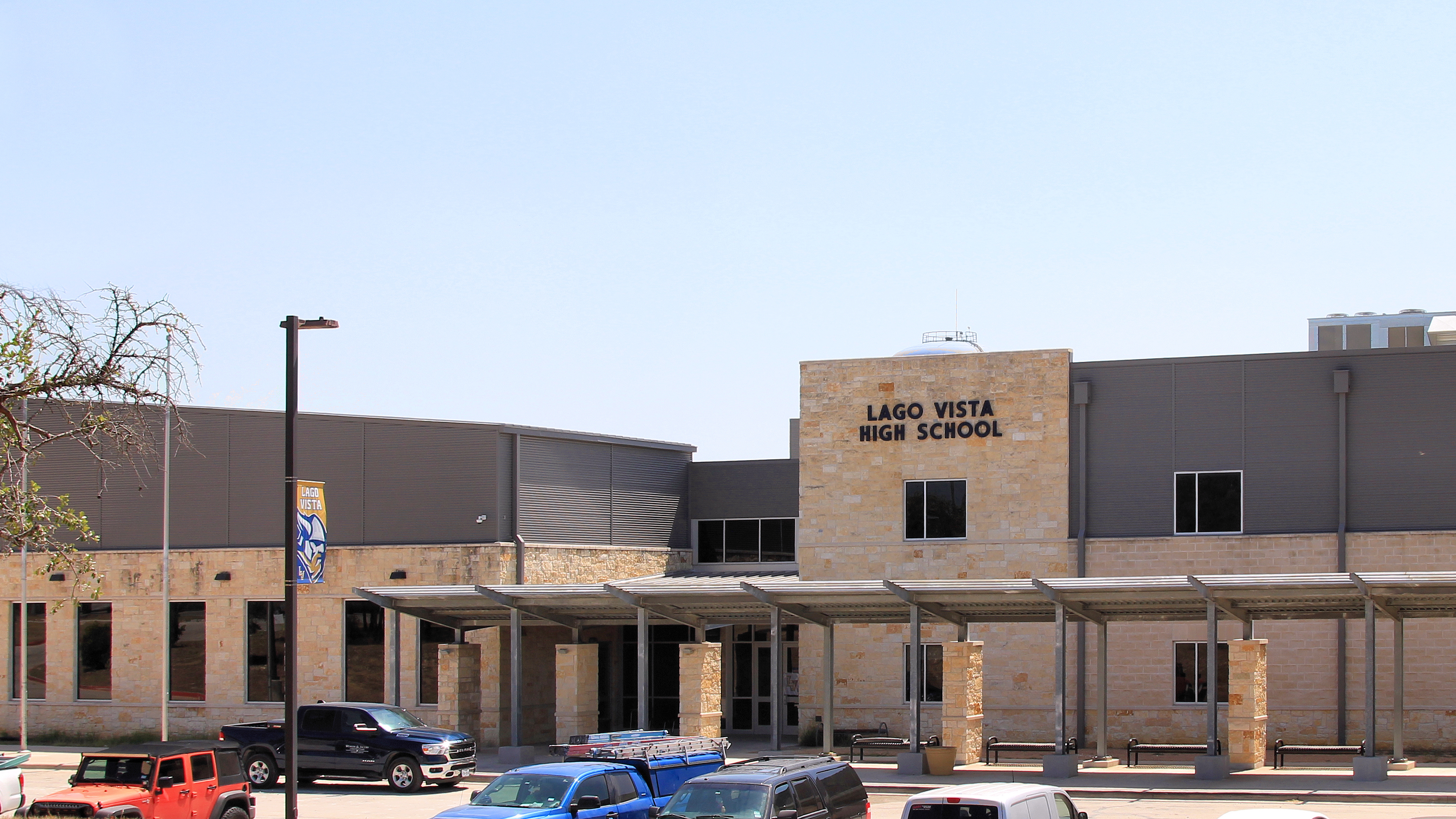
Lago Vista High School

Lago Vista Independent School District is a school district headquartered in Lago Vista, Texas, in the Austin metropolitan area.

Darren Webb is the current Superintendent of the district. Schools in the Lago Vista Independent School District include Lago Vista Elementary School, Lago Vista Intermediate School, Lago Vista Middle School, and Lago Vista High School.

The district serves almost all of Lago Vista and all of Point Venture, as well as portions of nearby Jonestown. The school district's current UIL Classification is 4A, Division 2. In total, the Lago Vista Independent School District serves just under 2,000 students. Enrollment is projected to increase to approximately 2,500 students by the 2026 school year as the area's population continues to grow at a rapid pace. In recent years, Lago Vista voters have approved a host of ballot propositions aimed at increasing funding for varying district extracurricular opportunities and improving district facilities.

== Governance ==
The Lago Vista Independent School District is governed by the Lago Vista ISD Board of Trustees, which has seven members elected to three year terms. Board members all represent the district at large rather than specific geographical areas.

== Academics ==
In 2010, the school district was rated "Exemplary" by the Texas Education Agency.

For the 2020-2021 academic school year, the graduation rate for Lago Vista ISD was 100%. The District is one of the top-rated districts in the Central Texas region with a Texas Education Agency (TEA) Accountability Rating of “A".

== Awards ==
In 2015, the theatre program at Lago Vista High School won the UIL Conference 3-A State One-Act championship.

== Gallery ==
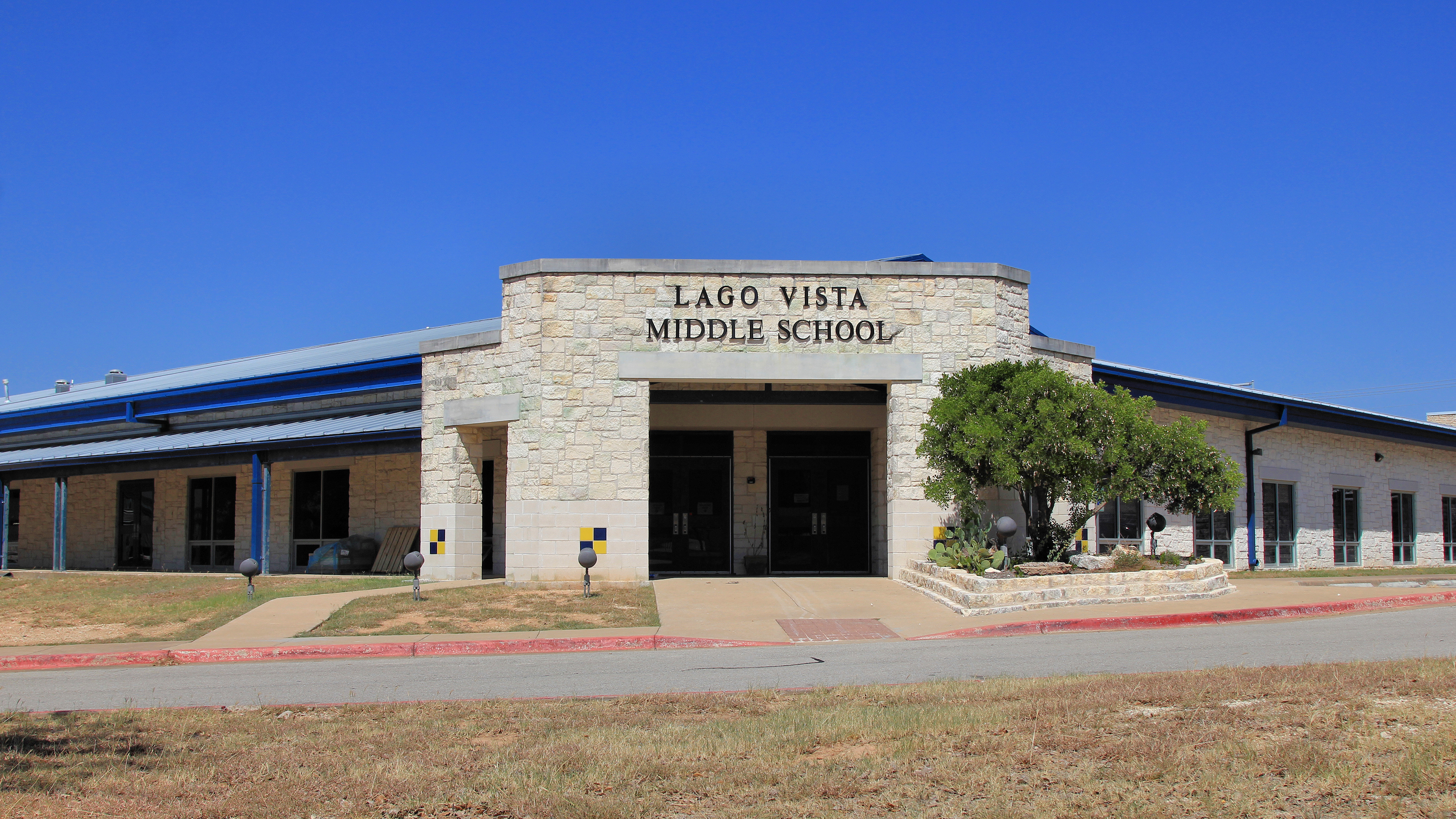
Lago Vista Middle School

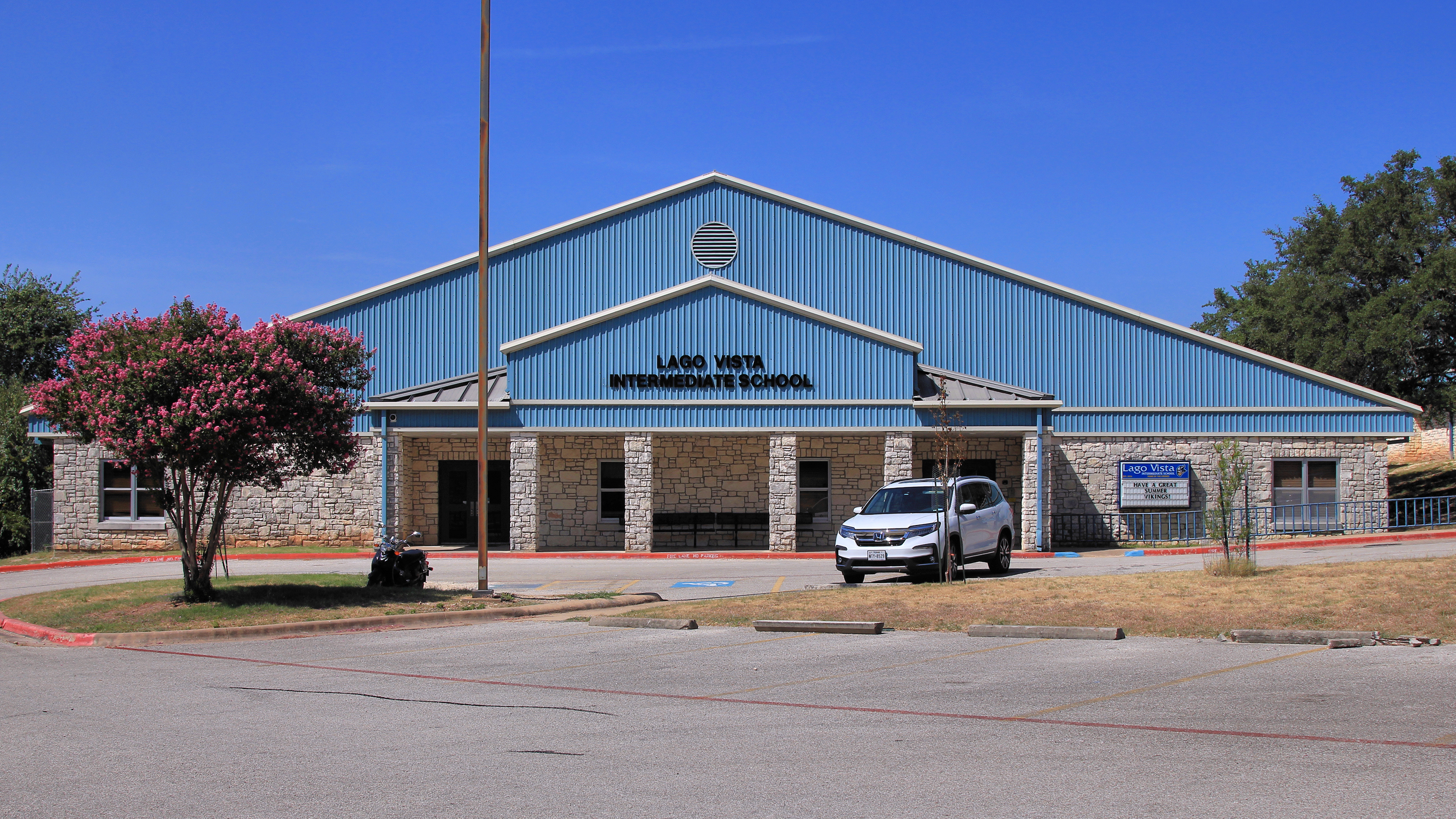
Lago Vista Intermediate School

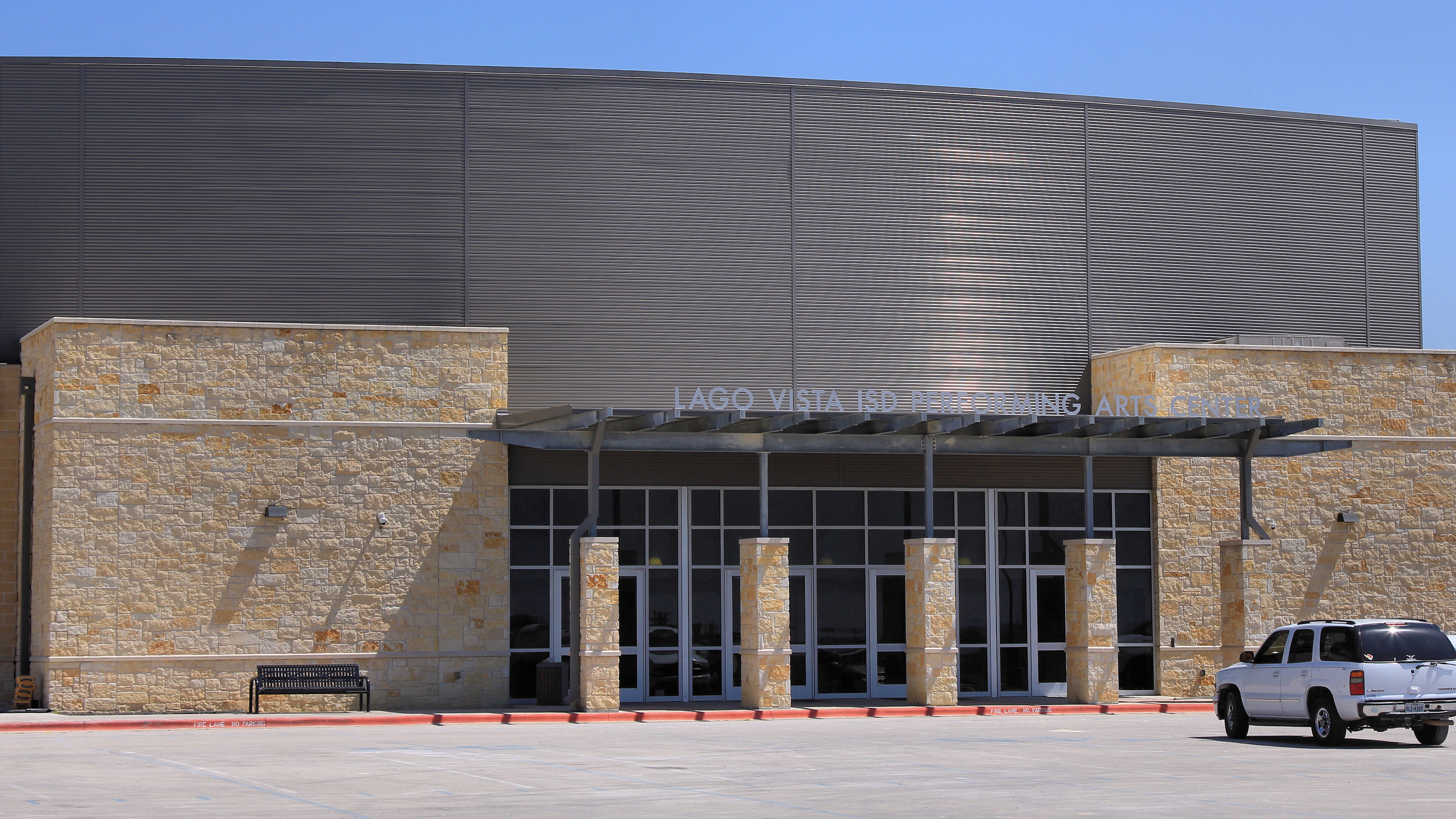
Lago Vista ISD Performing Arts Center
