= Jonestown, Texas =

- City
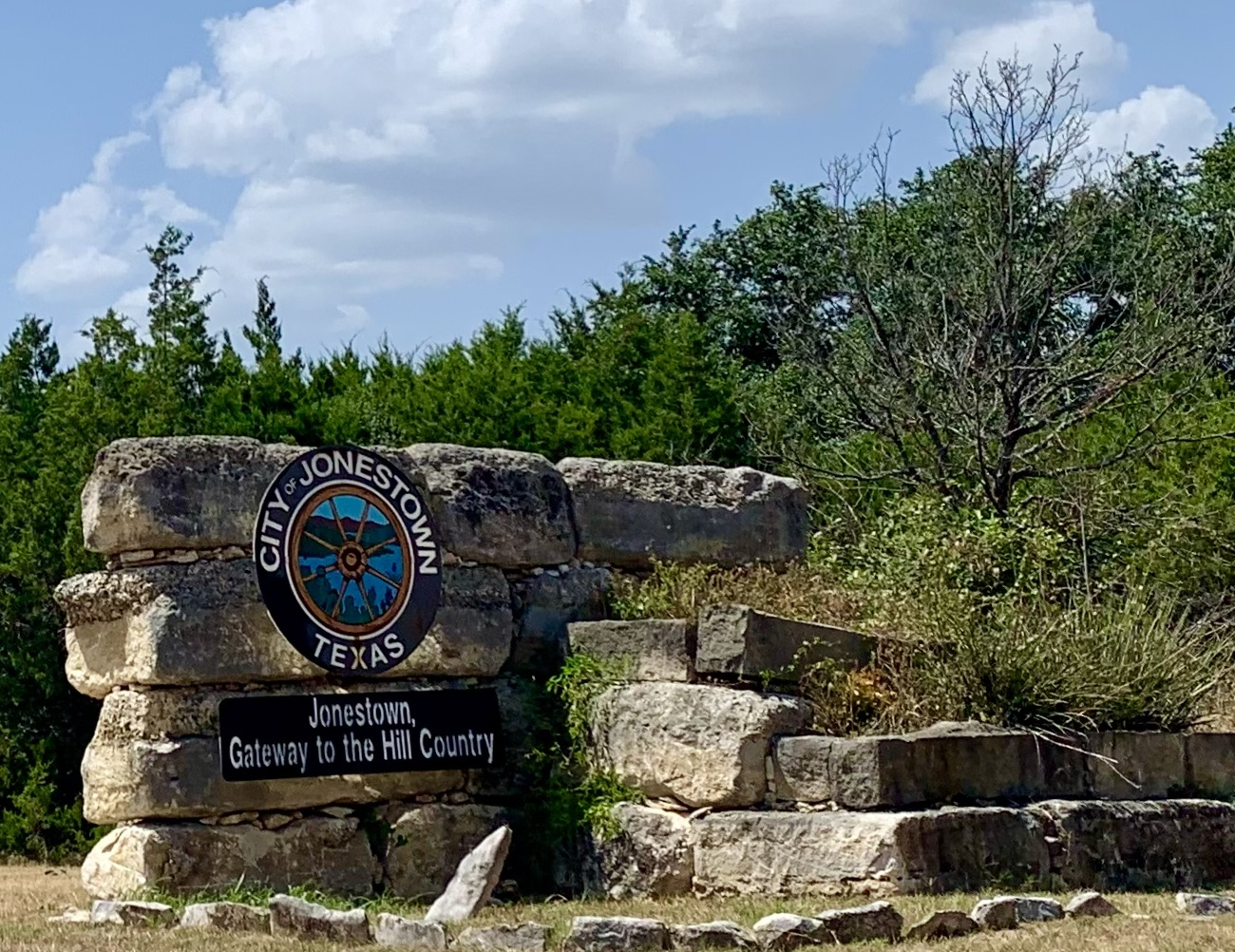
- Welcome sign at east border along RM 1431
- Motto: Gateway to the Hill Country
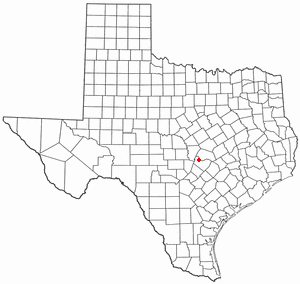
- Location of Jonestown, Texas

- Coordinates: 30°28′50″N 97°55′45″W
- Country: United States
- State: Texas
- County: Travis
- Incorporated: 1985; 41 years ago

Government
  - Type: Mayor-council
  - Mayor: Paul Johnson

Area
  - Total: 7.60 sq mi (19.68 km^{2})
  - Land: 6.41 sq mi (16.60 km^{2})
  - Water: 1.19 sq mi (3.09 km^{2})
- Elevation: 682 ft (208 m)

Population (2020)
  - Total: 2,365
  - Density: 328.5/sq mi (126.82/km^{2})
- Time zone: UTC-6 (Central (CST))
  - Summer (DST): UTC-5 (CDT)
- ZIP code: 78645
- Area code: 512
- FIPS code: 48-38020
- GNIS feature ID: 2410148
- Website: Official website

Jonestown is a city in Travis County, Texas, United States on the north shore of Lake Travis. The population was 2,365 at the 2020 census.

== History ==
Jonestown was developed by brothers Warren and Emmet A. Jones in the 1930s when they recognized the opportunity presented by the upcoming Mansfield Dam on the Colorado River. Once the dam was complete, Jonestown would become waterfront property along the Sandy Creek Arm and Big Devil's Hollow of the newly formed Lake Travis. The Jones brothers initially sold waterfront lots for $50 in 1939, raising the price to $100 and offering financing after complaints the original cost was too high.

The area had less than 1,000 residents until the late 1980s and residences were mostly weekend cabins. However, during this time the remote location also attracted "bike gangs, drug dealers and other ne'er-do-wells", according to a 1999 Austin American-Statesman article.

The city officially incorporated in 1985, with city leaders encouraging growth in an attempt to leave the settlement's less savory history behind. Following incorporation, growth was initially rapid, with the 1988 population of 683 growing to 1,250 by 1990 but a regional real estate bust brought it to a halt circa 1990.

In 1992, the community had a budget of just over US$310,000, a police force of two Travis County Sheriff's deputies, and a volunteer fire department, but did not provide any utilities. In the early and mid-1990s there were several attempts to disincorporate the city due to concerns around increased taxes and ordinances. Residents opposed to dissolution expressed fear that Austin would annex the territory if the city were dissolved, an original driving concern for the city's incorporation.

In 1996, Jonestown increased its borders by annexing a large parcel which had recently been bought by a real-estate development group. By 1999, the city had 1,500 residents and the Lake North area of Travis County, which includes Jonestown, had seen a 62% rise in median home prices from US$84,500 to US$137,250 in the five-year period from 1994 to 1999. These changes, along with a corresponding increase in its tax base, were welcomed by some residents as a way to increase city services. Others were unhappy with the changes feeling the population was growing too quickly. The population continued to increase, reaching 1,681 by 2000 and 1,834 by the 2010 census.

== Geography ==
Jonestown is located at the northern end of Lake Travis, 19 miles (31 km) northwest of Austin.

According to the United States Census Bureau, the city has a total area of 5.3 square miles (13.7 km^{2}), of which 4.7 square miles (12.1 km^{2}) is land and 0.6 square mile (1.6 km^{2}) (11.34%) is water.

== Demographics ==
Historical population
Census	Pop.	Note	%±
1990	1,250		—
2000	1,681		34.5%
2010	1,834		9.1%
2020	2,365		29.0%
U.S. Decennial Census

=== 2020 census ===
As of the 2020 census, Jonestown had a population of 2,365, the median age was 49.5 years, 17.2% of residents were under the age of 18, and 19.2% of residents were 65 years of age or older. For every 100 females there were 107.6 males, and for every 100 females age 18 and over there were 105.3 males age 18 and over.

57.0% of residents lived in urban areas, while 43.0% lived in rural areas.

There were 1,013 households in Jonestown, of which 25.8% had children under the age of 18 living in them. Of all households, 55.8% were married-couple households, 20.0% were households with a male householder and no spouse or partner present, and 18.1% were households with a female householder and no spouse or partner present. About 24.1% of all households were made up of individuals and 9.2% had someone living alone who was 65 years of age or older.

There were 1,265 housing units, of which 19.9% were vacant. The homeowner vacancy rate was 3.1% and the rental vacancy rate was 13.9%.

Racial composition as of the 2020 census
Race	Number	Percent
White	1,934	81.8%
Black or African American	23	1.0%
American Indian and Alaska Native	8	0.3%
Asian	55	2.3%
Native Hawaiian and Other Pacific Islander	2	0.1%
Some other race	77	3.3%
Two or more races	266	11.2%
Hispanic or Latino (of any race)	286	12.1%

=== 2000 census ===
As of the census of 2000, there were 1,681 people, 699 households, and 434 families residing in the city. The population density was 358.0 inhabitants per square mile (138.2/km^{2}). There were 770 housing units at an average density of 164.0 per square mile (63.3/km^{2}). The racial makeup of the city was 92.27% White, 0.83% African American, 0.42% Native American, 0.42% Asian, 3.57% from other races, and 2.50% from two or more races. Hispanic or Latino of any race were 9.58% of the population.

There were 699 households, out of which 29.6% had children under the age of 18 living with them, 46.9% were married couples living together, 9.7% had a female householder with no husband present, and 37.8% were non-families. 29.5% of all households were made up of individuals, and 5.0% had someone living alone who was 65 years of age or older. The average household size was 2.40 and the average family size was 2.98.

In the city, the population was spread out, with 24.3% under the age of 18, 8.0% from 18 to 24, 34.1% from 25 to 44, 25.5% from 45 to 64, and 8.0% who were 65 years of age or older. The median age was 37 years. For every 100 females, there were 110.9 males. For every 100 females age 18 and over, there were 108.3 males.

The median income for a household in the city was $43,167, and the median income for a family was $47,708. Males had a median income of $31,888 versus $26,797 for females. The per capita income for the city was $21,256. About 3.1% of families and 6.8% of the population were below the poverty line, including 7.3% of those under age 18 and 0.9% of those age 65 or over.

== Culture ==
Jones Brothers Park in Jonestown hosted approximately 200 anglers for a 2001 Texas Tournament Trail bass fishing tournament event.

== Amenities ==
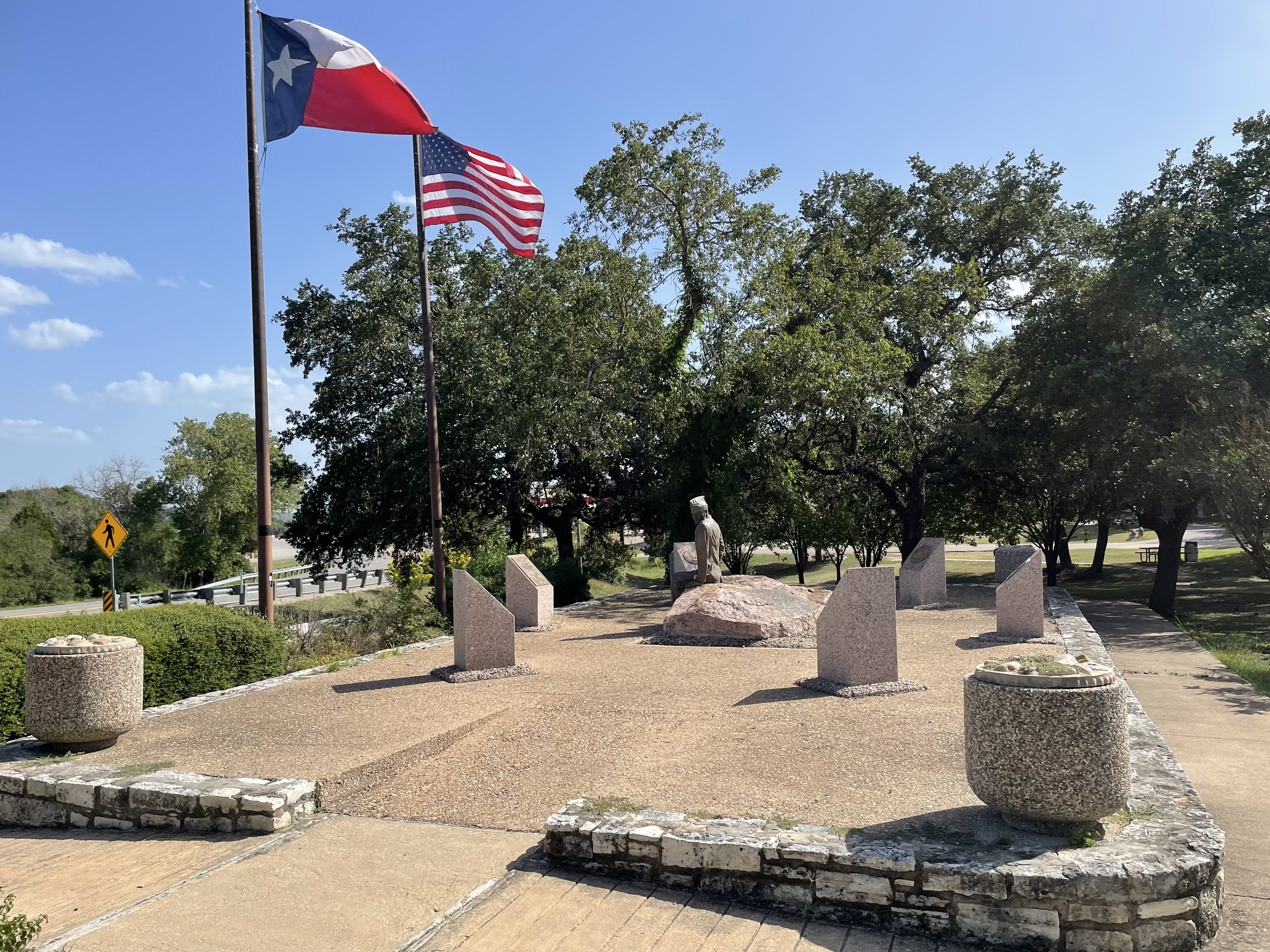
Veterans Memorial Park in September 2021

There are a number of developed and undeveloped city parks in Jonestown. The developed parks include:

- Jones Brothers Park, a 32-acre lakeshore park along the Sandy Creek Arm of Lake Travis just south of the center of the city. The park is the most developed of the city's parks containing recreational amenities and the city's three public boat ramps.
- Canyonlands Trail Park which contains a half-mile nature trail connecting Jones Brothers Park with Fireman's Park
- Fireman's Park and Shady Park, two small parks near the center of the city connected to each other by a footpath. Fireman's Park is adjacent to the city's only public transportation, a CapMetro Bus park-and-ride stop.
- Veterans Park, a small park near the city center containing the city's veterans memorial. It is the only developed park north of RM 1431.
- Pecan Park, a small park along Big Sandy Creek also known as Pecan Bottom. It was officially turned into a public park after locals constantly maintained a rock dam in the creek.

The city also manages several undeveloped parks within city limits: David Reed Park, Laura Reed Park, and unnamed Parks 1 and 7. Additionally, the city both contains and is surrounded by a number of areas of publicly accessible, undeveloped forestland, much of it owned by the Lower Colorado River Authority.

== Infrastructure ==
RM 1431 runs through the center of Jonestown. This east-west route connects Marble Falls (30 mi west) and Cedar Park (8 mi east). In the spring of 2008, FM 1431 had major re-engineering to straighten and widen the highway to support rapid growth along the North Shore of Lake Travis which RM 1431 serves.

Austin-area CapMetro's CapMetro Bus route 214 - Northwest Feeder has one park-and-ride and two other stops in Jonestown. The route runs from neighboring Lago Vista, west of Jonestown, to Lakeline station, a transit center east of Jonestown in Northwest Austin.

== Education ==
The City of Jonestown is served by the Leander Independent School District and the Lago Vista Independent School District.

== Notable person ==
- Travis Parker, professional snowboarder originally from Jonestown

== See also ==
- Media related to Jonestown, Texas at Wikimedia Commons
