= Airblaster =

Clothing company in United States

Airblaster, LLC
- Company type: Private
- Industry: Snowboarding
- Founded: 2002; 24 years ago
- Headquarters: Portland, Oregon
- Key people: Jesse Grandoski; Paul Miller; Travis Parker; Tyler Scharpf
- Products: Outerwear, goggles, first layer "Ninja suits", ski suits "freedom suits"
- Website: http://www.myairblaster.com/

Airblaster is a clothing company based in the United States. It makes clothes and accessories for snowboarding and other winter sports. It is independently owned.

Airblaster has created different types of mountain apparel since the early 2000s. The company's products include outerwear, goggles, and long underwear. Most of the products are designed for snowboarding.
