= Point Venture, Texas =

- Village
- Location of Point Venture, Texas
- Coordinates: 30°22′55″N 98°00′05″W
- Country: United States
- State: Texas
- Counties: Travis

Area
  - Total: 1.87 sq mi (4.85 km^{2})
  - Land: 0.86 sq mi (2.23 km^{2})
  - Water: 1.01 sq mi (2.62 km^{2})
- Elevation: 804 ft (245 m)

Population (2020)
  - Total: 1,260
  - Density: 1,460/sq mi (565/km^{2})
- Time zone: UTC-6 (Central (CST))
  - Summer (DST): UTC-5 (CDT)
- ZIP code: 78645
- Area code: 512
- FIPS code: 48-58586
- GNIS feature ID: 2413579
- Website: http://vopv.org/

Point Venture is a village in western Travis County, Texas, United States. The population was 1,260 as of the 2020 census.

Located on the north bank of Lake Travis, Point Venture has been a second home and family vacation destination since the early 1970s. It has matured into a community of full-time residents, with over 150 children attending Lago Vista Schools. It features golfing, boating, lake access, and other amenities. Point Venture was incorporated in August 2000.

The Lago Vista Independent School District serves area students.

== Geography ==
Point Venture has a total area of 1.9 square miles (4.9 km^{2}), of which 0.9 square miles (2.3 km^{2}) is land and 1.0 square mile (2.6 km^{2}) is water.

== Demographics ==
Historical population
Census	Pop.	Note	%±
2010	800		—
2020	1,260		57.5%
U.S. Decennial Census

== Government ==
Point Venture was incorporated in 2000 with a council-manager system of local government. The six members serve two year terms. As of May 2026, Point Venture Council members are as follows:

- Mayor: Justin Hamilton
- Mayor Pro Tem: Scott Staeb
- Council Member: Alex Broughton
- Council Member: Bobby Amidon
- Council Member: Kevin Davis
- Council Member: Daniel Mershon

Point Venture is represented in the Texas House of Representatives by Republican, Ellen Troxclair. In the State Senate, Point Venture is represented by Republican, Donna Campbell.
